= 1954 in Albania =

- Decades: 1930s; 1940s; 1950s; 1960s; 1970s
- See also: Other events of 1954; List of years in Albania

The following lists events that happened during 1954 in the People's Republic of Albania.

== Incumbents ==
- First Secretary: Enver Hoxha
- Chairman of the Presidium of the People's Assembly: Haxhi Lleshi
- Prime Minister: Enver Hoxha (until 20 July) Mehmet Shehu (from 20 July)

== Events ==
Ongoing — Albanian–Yugoslav border conflict (1948–1954) (until 9 December)

=== Unknown date ===
- 1954 Albanian National Championship: FK Partizani Tirana is awarded as the champion of the season.

=== January to April ===
- 17 January - 1953 Albanian Cup: team Dinamo Tirana wins the finals, beating Partizani with a 2-0.
- 4 February - Capitalist district commissioner Pilo Peristeri is executed by firing squad after there were allegations circulating about him being an "American-paid conspirator".

=== May to August ===
- 28 May - 1954 Albanian parliamentary election: the Democratic Front wins the election with 99.8% of votes.
- 19 July - Mehmet Shehu is elected as the Prime Minister of Albania.

=== September to December ===
- 9 October - The Albanian Telegraphic Agency is officially established as its current name.
- 25 October - The Hero of Socialist Labor award is established. It was the highest labor award in Albania, awarded to those who had exceptional achievements for their country.
- 17 November - 1954 Albanian Cup: team Dinamo Tirana wins the finals, beating Partizani with a 2-1.
- 9 December - The Pogradec Agreement is signed by Dušan Mugoša and Mehmet Shehu, officially marking an end to the Albanian–Yugoslav border conflict.

== Births ==
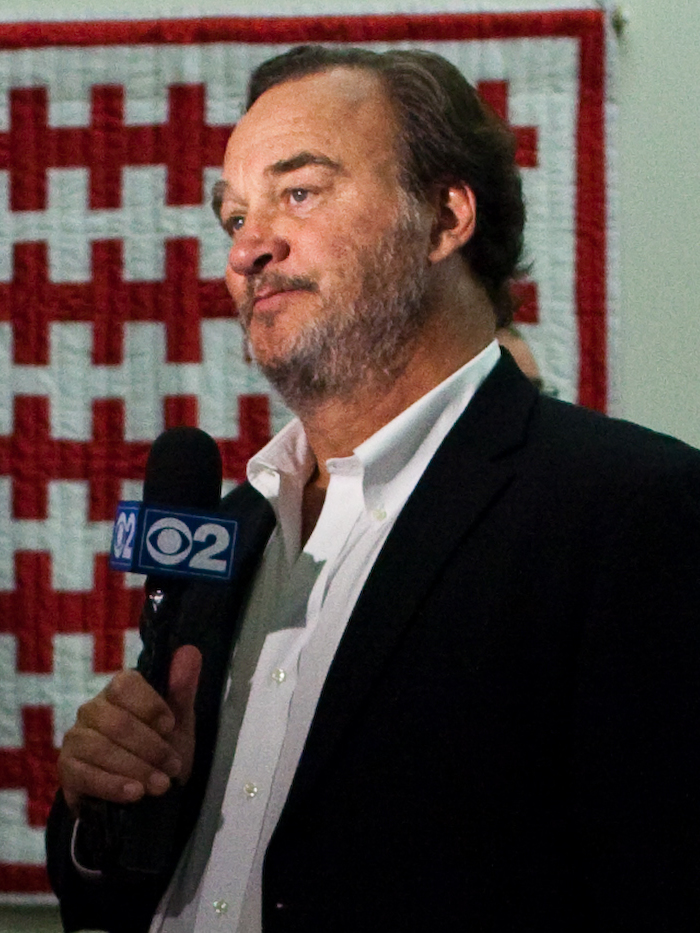
Jim Belushi

- Vasiliev Nini - sculptor
- 12 January - Vigjilenca Demiraj, hepatologist and author
- 18 January - Muharrem Hoxha, comic actor
- 2 February:
  - Bashkim Hoxha, writer and screenwriter
  - Enver Maloku, Kosovo Albanian journalist and writer
- 6 February - Sakip Camii, writer, poet and publicist
- 28 February - Enver Petrovci, actor, writer, and director
- 14 March - Shyqyri Ballgjini, former footballer (striker)
- 20 March - Hajdar Muneka, diplomat and journalist (RTSH)
- 20 April - Fatmir Hima, footballer (striker)
- 5 May - Adriana Gjonaj, engineer and member of the Parliament of Albania
- 13 May - Artan Sejko, actor
- 3 June - Luke Qafoku, researcher and university professor
- 15 June - Jim Belushi, American-born Albanian, actor, comedian and musician
- 21 August - Fatos Tarifa, former diplomat, lecturer and social scientist
- 28 October - Halim Kosova, gynecologist and Albania's Minister of Health (April 2013–September 2013)
- 21 November - Çlirim Hoxha, writer, journalist and researcher
- 19 December - Alajdin Demiri, political commenter and former mayor of Tetovo
- 26 December - Arian Starova, academist, philosopher and politician

== Deaths ==
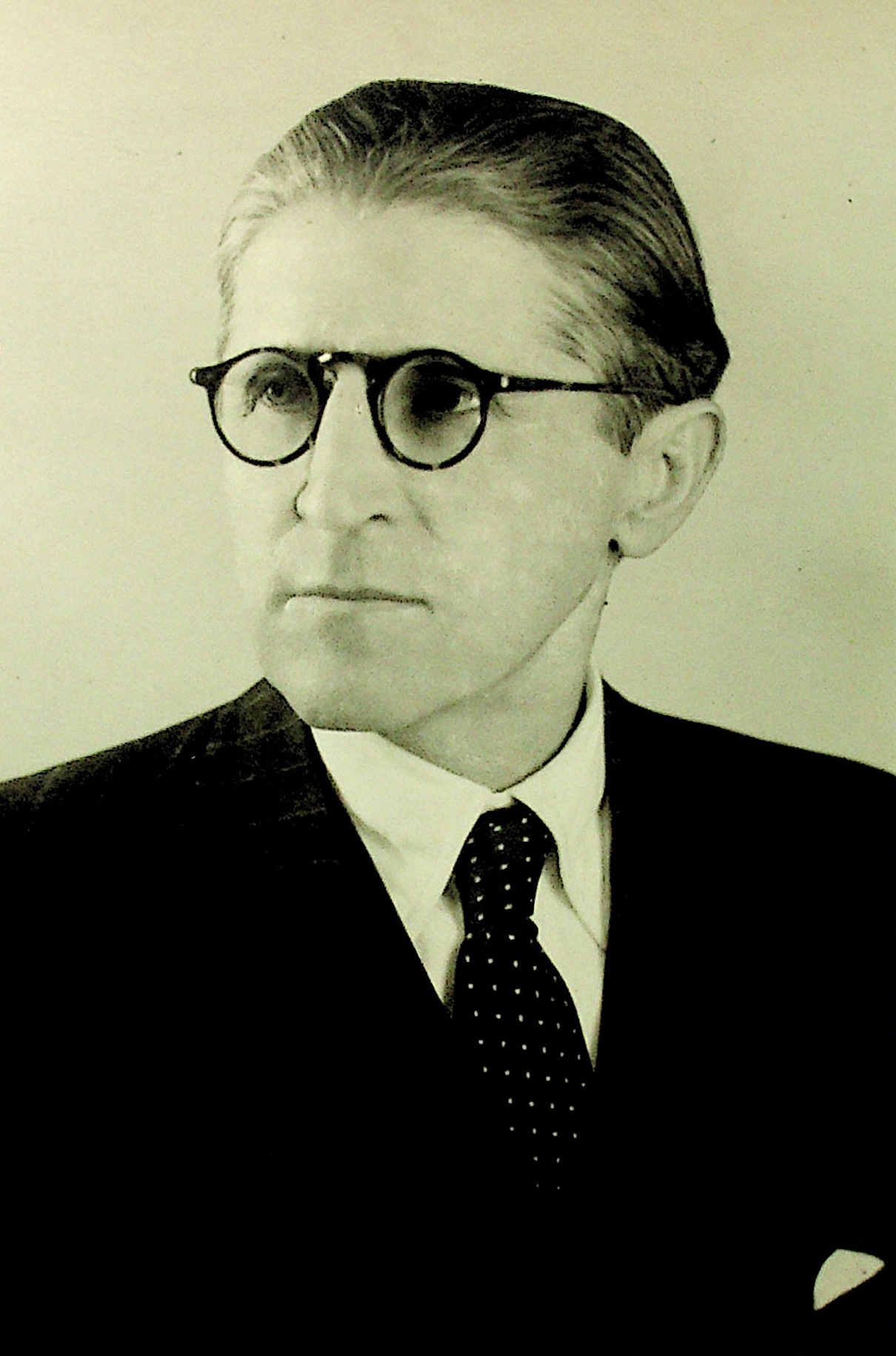
Omer Nishani

- Izedin Beshiri, former mayor of Shkodra, politician and Minister of Public Works
- Myrteza Vuci, ulama and imam
- Sabri Tefiku, pathologist
- Shaqe Çoba, feminist, suffragist and founder of the Gruaja Shqiptare
- Xhavid Leskoviku, army officer, activist, diplomat and 3rd Chief of the General Staff, died in prison
- 28 February - Gjergj Bubani, writer, translator and publisher (Kosova)
- 9 March - Izet Malo, soldier
- 26 May - Omer Nishani, medical doctor, politician, Chairman of the Presidium of the People's Assembly of Albania (1946–1953) and the Ministry for Europe and Foreign Affairs (1944–1946), suicide or assassination
- 1 July - Tefik Mborja, lawyer and general secretary of the Albanian Fascist Party
- 21 November - Koço Muka, politician, lawyer and Minister of Education (August 1944–September 1944)
