= 1953 in Albania =

- Decades: 1930s; 1940s; 1950s; 1960s; 1970s
- See also: Other events of 1953; List of years in Albania

The following lists events that happened during 1953 in the People's Republic of Albania.

== Incumbents ==
- First Secretary: Enver Hoxha
- Chairman of the Presidium of the People's Assembly: Omer Nishani (until 1 August) Haxhi Lleshi (from 1 August)
- Prime Minister: Enver Hoxha

== Events ==
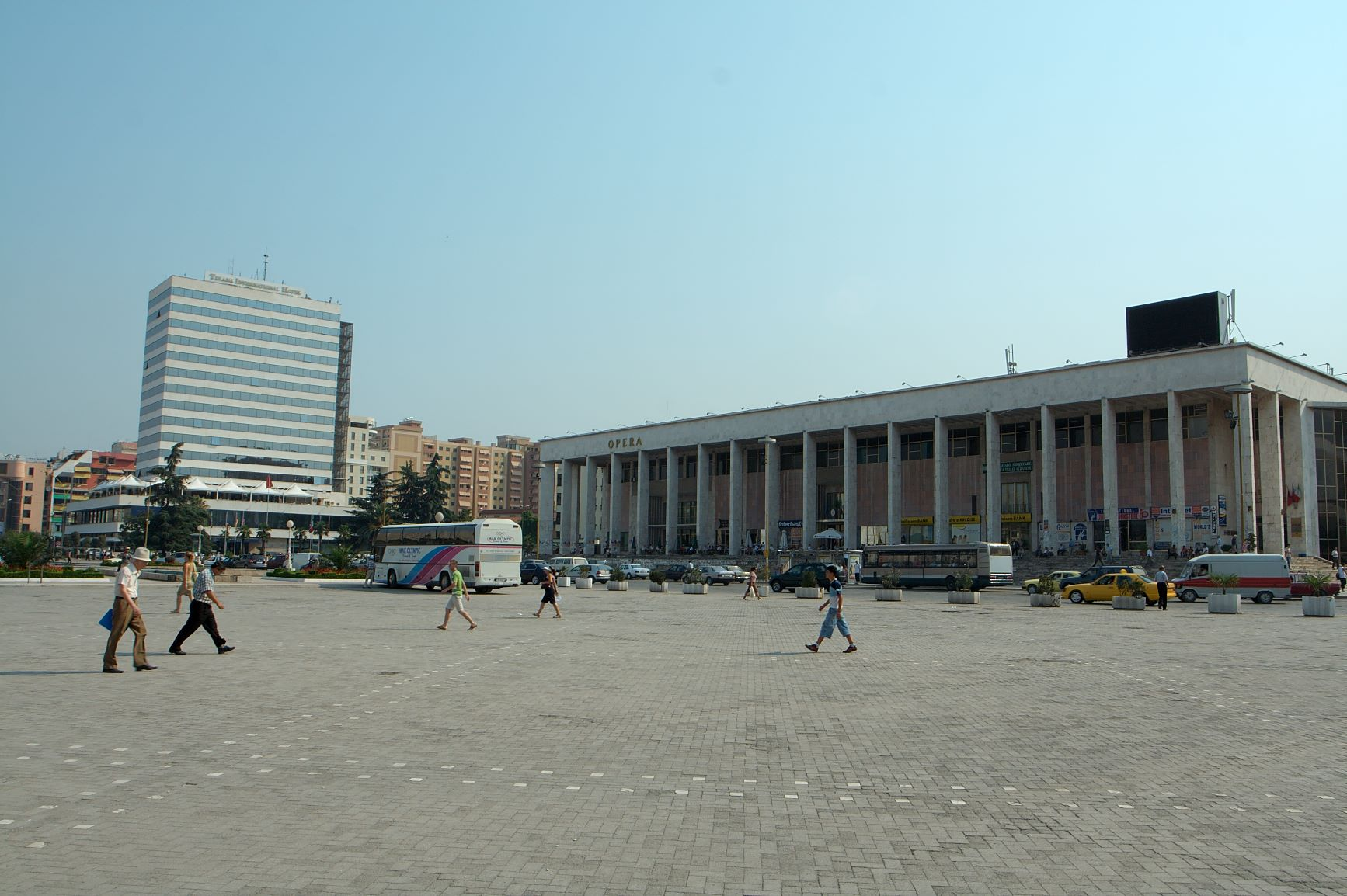
The National Theatre of Opera and Ballet of Albania pictured in 2007.

Ongoing — Albanian–Yugoslav border conflict (1948–1954)

=== Unknown date ===
- 1953 Albanian National Championship: Dinamo Tirana is awarded as the champion of the season.
- Throughout the year, there were 11 recorded instances of propaganda material being smuggled from Albania into Yugoslav territory. Additionally, 15 attempted sabotage operations by Albanian groups were recorded over the course of the year.

=== January to April ===
- 11 January - The Aleksandër Moisiu Theatre, named after the Austrian stage actor of the same name, opens in Durrës
- March - The first round of the 1953 Albanian Cup starts.

=== May to August ===
- 24 June - Yugoslav Corporal Boško Žilović is killed in a clash between the Yugoslav People's Army and Albanian People's Army in the mountains of Deçani. A border outpost near the future site of the Battle of Košare is later named after him in honor of his legacy.
- 29 July - Yugoslav forces fell to a trap set up by Albanian forces near Junik, leaving one Yugoslav soldier severely injured.
- 30 July - A Yugoslav soldier is killed while restoring border markers.
- 1 August - Haxhi Lleshi takes office as the de jure Chairman of the Presidium of the People's Assembly.
- 2 August - The Yugoslav fighters clashed with Albanian forces in the vicinity of Vërmica, leaving two Yugoslav soldiers wounded.

=== September to December ===
- 27 November - The first stage opera of the National Theatre of Opera and Ballet of Albania is performed and led by Russian composer Alexander Dargomyzhsky.
- 29 November - The National Theatre of Opera and Ballet of Albania opens in Skanderbeg Square, Tirana.

== Births ==
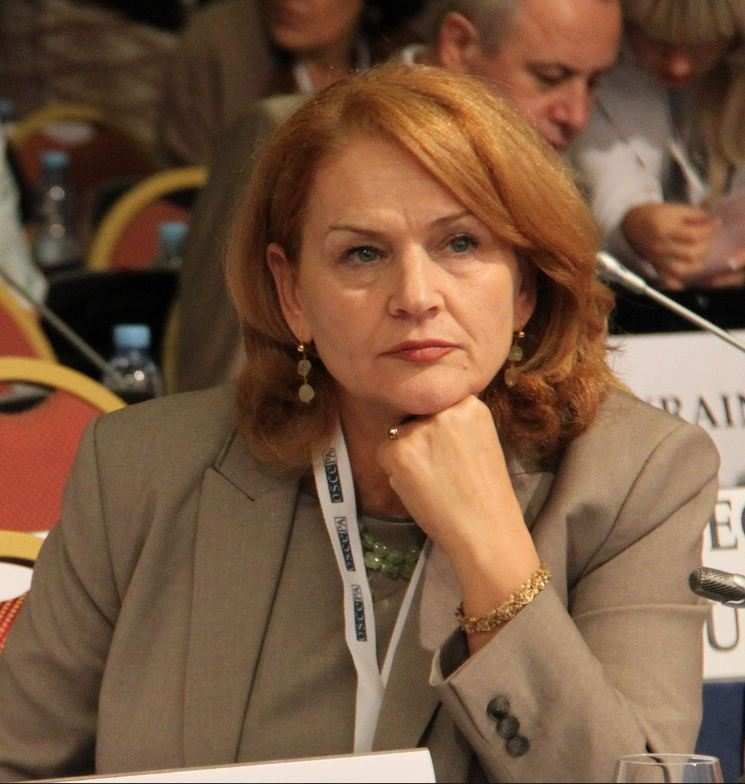
Arta Dade

- Agim Kadillari, painter
- Arbana Xharra, journalist and International Women of Courage Award recipient
- Ferdonije Qerkezi, Kosovo war documentarian, historian and archivist
- Viktor Çaro, actor (Balkan Bazaar)
- 23 February - Leon Qafzezi, film director, FILM magazine founder and journalist (Bashkimi)
- 15 March - Arta Dade, politician and former member of the Parliament of Albania for the Socialist Party.
- 24 May - Agim Rada, sculptor
- 17 July - Bardhyl Berberi, journalist and writer
- 15 September - Astrit Hafizi, former footballer and football coach (KF Vilaznia)
- 11 October - Gazmend Leka, scholar, painter and artistic director
- 15 October - Yllka Mujo, actress and Merited Artist of Albania awardee
- 17 November - Arifhikmet Xhemaili, politician, university professor
- 31 December - Bashkim Lahi, archaeologist

== Deaths ==
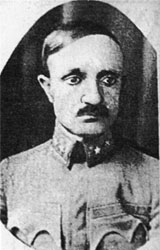
Ali Shefqet Shkupi

- Spiro Xega, nationalist painter
- Qazim bej Vlora, son of Ismail Qemali
- Lame Kareco, politician and Minister of Finance (1931–1932)
- 17 January - Haki Stërmilli, writer, LANÇ member, former deputy of the Albanian Parliament, and novelist (If I Were a Boy)
- 14 April - Xhelal Abaz, Spanish Civil War soldier
- 25 April - Kadri Zeka, academic and eponym of the University of Gjilan
- 24 June - Jashar Erebara, newspaper founder and activist
- 22 September - Mirash Ivanaj, school director and Ministry of Education, Sports and Youth (1933–1935)
- 17 November - Xhafer Sylejmani, physician and former mayor of Tetovo (1941–1943)
- 3 December - Ali Shefqet Shkupi, Lieutenant Colonel and first Chief of the Albanian General Staff (1913–1920)
- 22 December - Kostandin Boshnjaku, communist politician, translator, LANÇ member and General Director of the Albanian State Bank
