= 1952 in Albania =

- Decades: 1930s; 1940s; 1950s; 1960s; 1970s
- See also: Other events of 1952; List of years in Albania

The following lists events that happened during 1952 in the People's Republic of Albania.

== Incumbents ==
- First Secretary: Enver Hoxha
- Chairman of the Presidium of the People's Assembly: Omer Nishani
- Prime Minister: Enver Hoxha

== Events ==
Ongoing — Albanian–Yugoslav border conflict (1948–1954)

=== Unknown date ===
- The Tirana Circus is founded by a group of artists.
- 1952 Albanian National Championship: Dinamo Tirana is awarded as the champion of the season.
- Italian banker Giuseppe Terrusi is arrested and executed in Burrel Prison. In September 2020, during searching for those who disappeared during Enver Hoxha's dictatorship, the prison was excavated for the remains of Terrusi as requested by the Italian Government. Terrusi's body was nowhere to be found.
- 13 sabotage attempts from Albanian forces into Yugoslavia were recorded throughout the year. Nine of the 13 attempts did not result in any casualties or losses from both sides, whereas two other instances resulted in the death of at least one Albanian saboteur. The remaining instance resulted in the death of one Yugoslavian soldier. Also over the course of that year, the KNOJ border units managed to capture 14 illegal crossers from Yugoslavia into Albania, one of whom was killed while attempting to escape, as well as 251 persons who tried to enter Yugoslavia illegally.

=== May to August ===
- 2 July - A two-man Yugoslav patrol team is ambushed by Albania in Yugoslavian territory. The Albanians withdrew under the cover of their machine gun. One soldier was wounded in the skirmish.
- 24 July - A brief border skirmish involving Yugoslav forces and Albanian forces near Andrijevica resulted in the injury of one border guard.
- 20 August - Near the village of Žirovnica, Albanian saboteurs clashed with Yugoslav forces, leaving three policemen wounded.
- 24 August - Another clash in Yugoslav territory involving the same forces injured one policeman near Rubnice locality. Due to these clashes, the Yugoslav Ministry of Foreign Affairs demanded compensation for their losses from the Albanian government, but they did not respond.

=== September to December ===
- 19 October - 1952 Albanian Cup: team Dinamo Tirana wins the finals, beating Puna Tirana with a score of 4–1.
- 20 November - The Order of the Red Star (Albania) is established.

== Births ==
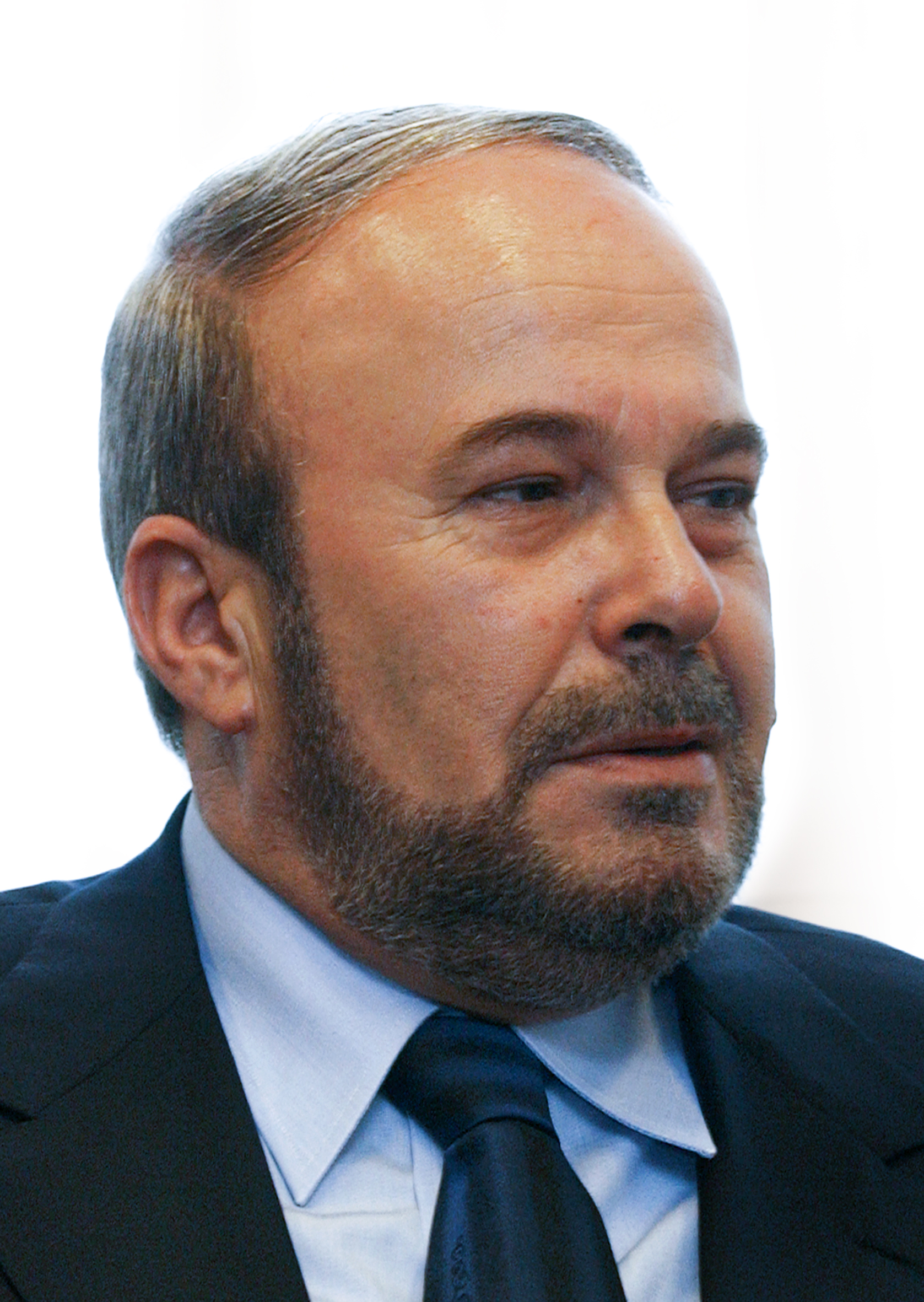
Fatos Nano

- Reshat Sahitaj, politician and author
- Shkurte Pal Vata, child construction worker
- Skënder Rusi , writer and poet
- January - Luan Rama, writer, diplomat and former Ambassador of Albania to UNESCO (1997–2001) and France (1991–1992)
- 21 March - Edmond Budina, actor, director and writer
- 26 March - Ylli Pango, academic and politician
- 17 April - Nexhati Tafa, screenwriter, producer and director for the National Center of Cinematography
- 4 August - Vasillaq Zëri, footballer (striker)
- 18 August - Kastriot Islami, 30th Speaker of the Parliament of Albania (1991–1992) and 61st Minister of Foreign Affairs (2003–2005)
- 25 October - Nazmije Hoxha, folk singer
- 2 December - Visar Zhiti, writer and former Minister of Culture, Youth and Sports (April–September 2013)
- 16 December - Fatos Nano, former Chairman of the Socialist Party of Albania (1991–2005} and 25th Prime Minister of Albania (numerous terms)

== Deaths ==
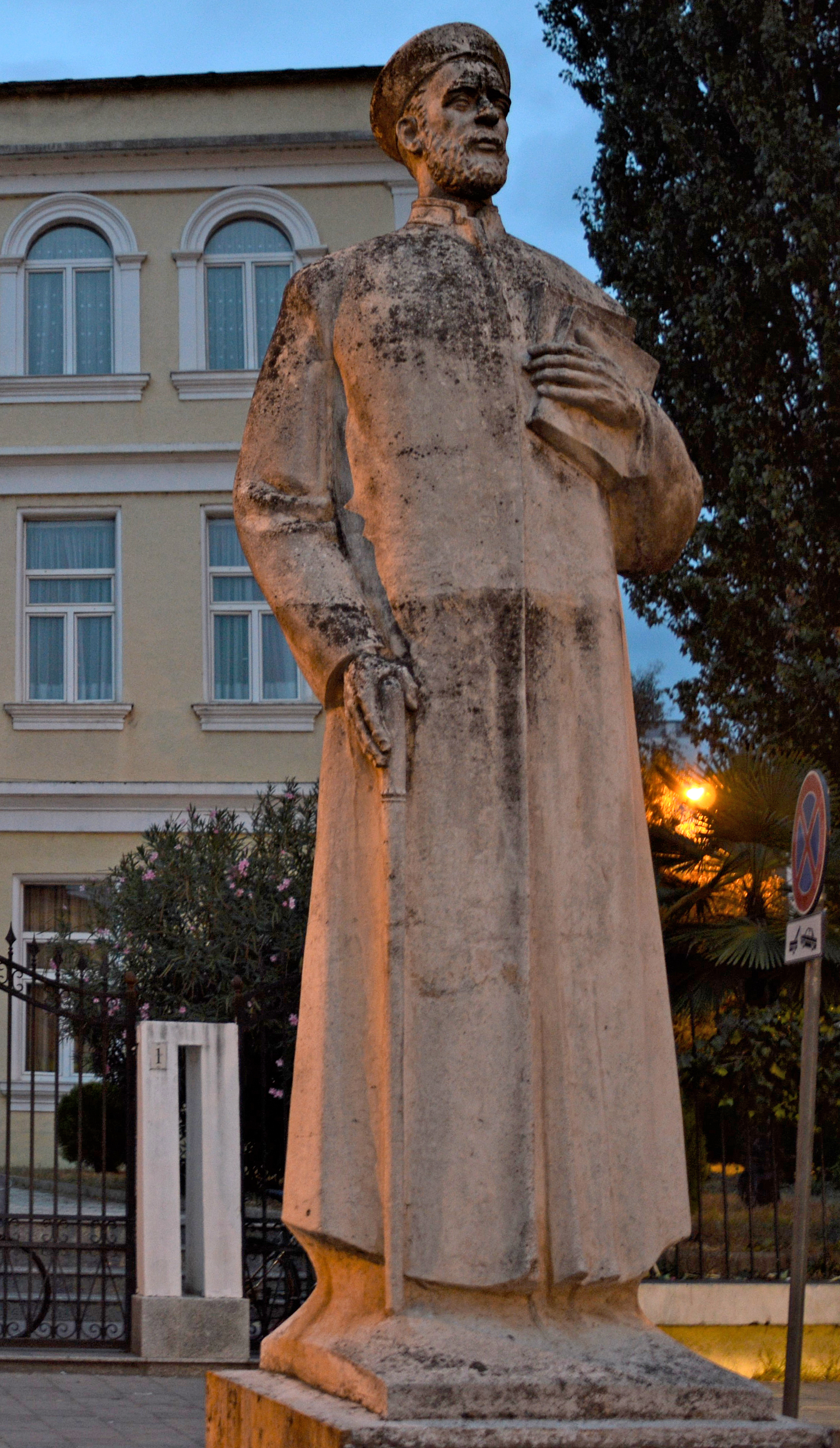
Ibrahim Dalliu

- Dervish Biçaku, landowner, Aleksandër Xhuvani University of Elbasan financier and delegate of Elbasan in the Albanian Declaration of Independence
- Ismet Bey Kryeziu, nationalist politician, died in prison
- Kemal Vrioni, economist and politician
- 6 January - Kostaq Cipo, linguist, publisher, academic and the former Minister of Education (1945–1946)
- 24 January - Shaban Mangjolli, Albanian soldier
- 25 May - Ibrahim Dalliu, Muslim scholar and Mufassir, died in prison
- 2 November - Mehmet Esat Bülkat, Ottoman Army officer and soldier
