= 1951 in Albania =

- Decades: 1930s; 1940s; 1950s; 1960s; 1970s
- See also: Other events of 1951; List of years in Albania

The following lists events that happened during 1951 in the People's Republic of Albania.

== Incumbents ==
- First Secretary: Enver Hoxha
- Chairman of the Presidium of the People's Assembly: Omer Nishani
- Prime Minister: Enver Hoxha

== Events ==
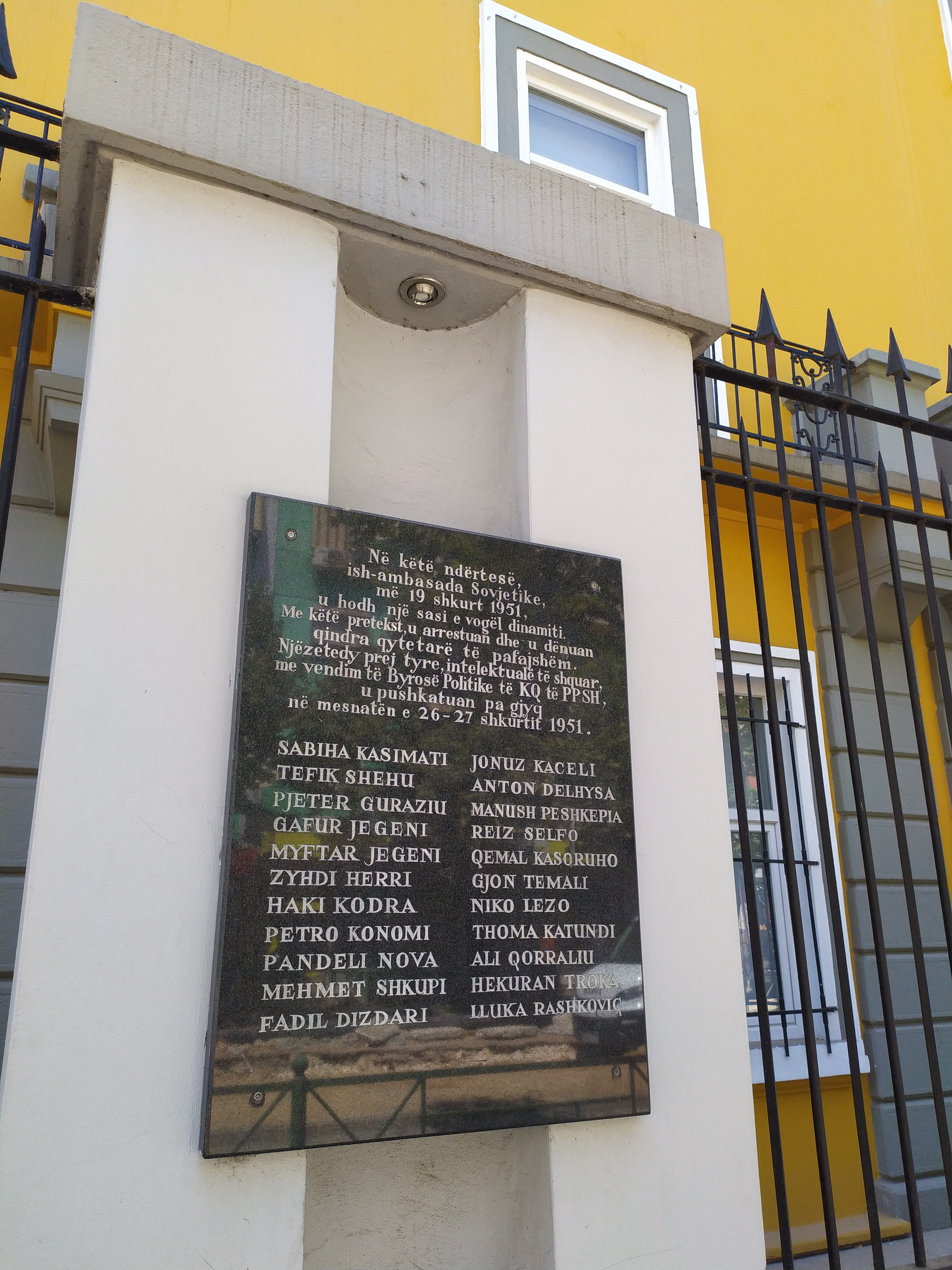
Memorial plaque of the 1951 executions in Albania victims

Ongoing — Albanian–Yugoslav border conflict (1948–1954)

=== Unknown date ===
- The 1951 Albanian National Championship is won by the Dinamo Tirana.
- The first Albanian Basketball Cup is held, resulting in the winning of the Partizani Basket.

=== January to April ===
- February - Albania and the Soviet Union signs an agreement on mutual economic assistance.
- 19 February - A CIA confidential report that was released in 2010 stated there was an alleged bombing of the Soviet Embassy in the capital city of Tirana which initially killed eight people and wounded six others. Immediately after the explosion, 12 more, including six policemen and an Albanian deputy, were killed after the Albanian Security Police allegedly opened fire on the crowd. One thousand more were arrested after this incident.
- 25–26 February - 1951 executions in Albania: 23 intellectuals are executed by firing squad near the Beshiri Bridge in Tirana County. A day before the massacre, one individual, Jonuz Kaceli, was killed after punching and injuring Mehmet Shehu.
- March–May - 1951 Albanian Cup
- 13 March - The Archaeological Museum of Durrës is established and opened in Durrës.

=== May to August ===
- 22 August - A magnitude 5.1 inland earthquake with the epicenter in Gjirokastër Municipality hits Southern Albania.

== Births ==
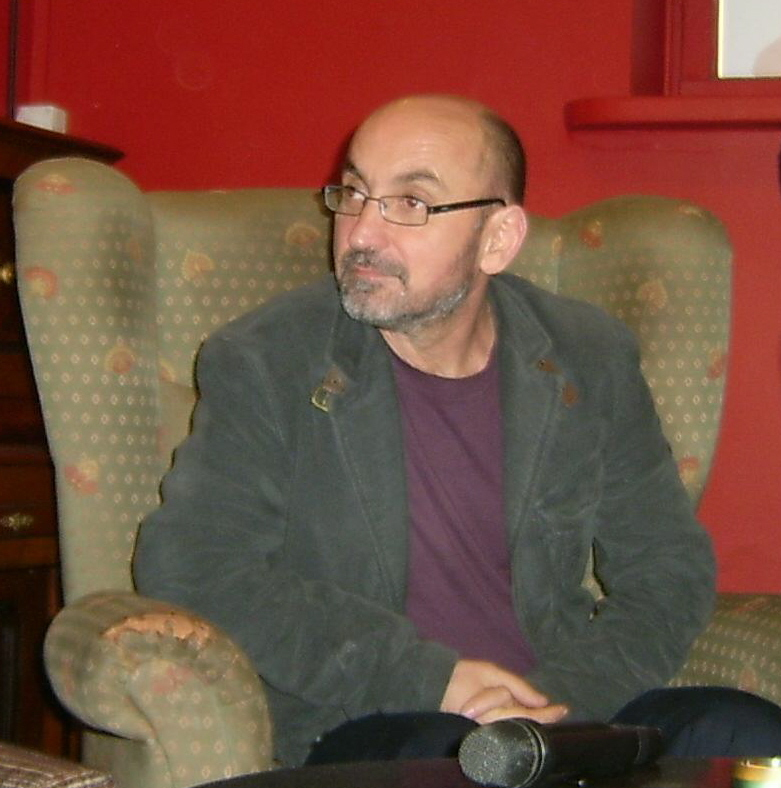
Fatos Lubonja

- Iliriana Sulkuqi, writer, poet and journalist
- 20 February - Idajet Beqiri, lawyer and chairman of the National Unity Party
- 16 March - Sevim Arbana, women's rights activist and founder of the NGO Useful to Albanian Women
- 13 April - Diana Çuli, journalist, politician and chairwoman of the Albania Women's Federation
- 27 April - Fatos Lubonja, writer and publisher of the Përpjekja journal
- 7 May - Ilir Përnaska, footballer (striker)
- 21 June - Dashnor Kokonozi, director and founder of the National Centre of Cultural Property Inventory
- 23 June - Ylljet Aliçka, writer and novelist
- 11 July - Aleksandër Peçi, composer and Merited Artist awardee
- 7 August - Milto Gurma, footballer
- 3 October - Zaho Balili, poet, writer and rhapsodist
- 25 October - Luan Skuqi, member of the Albanian Parliament and the Minister of Education and Sport from March to July 1997
- 5 December - Vilson Ahmeti, politician and Prime Minister of Albania from 1991 to 1992
- 6 December - Gramoz Ruçi, former head of the Socialist Party of Albania and 37th Speaker of the Parliament of Albania
- 19 December - Marenglen Verli, scholar and historian

== Deaths ==
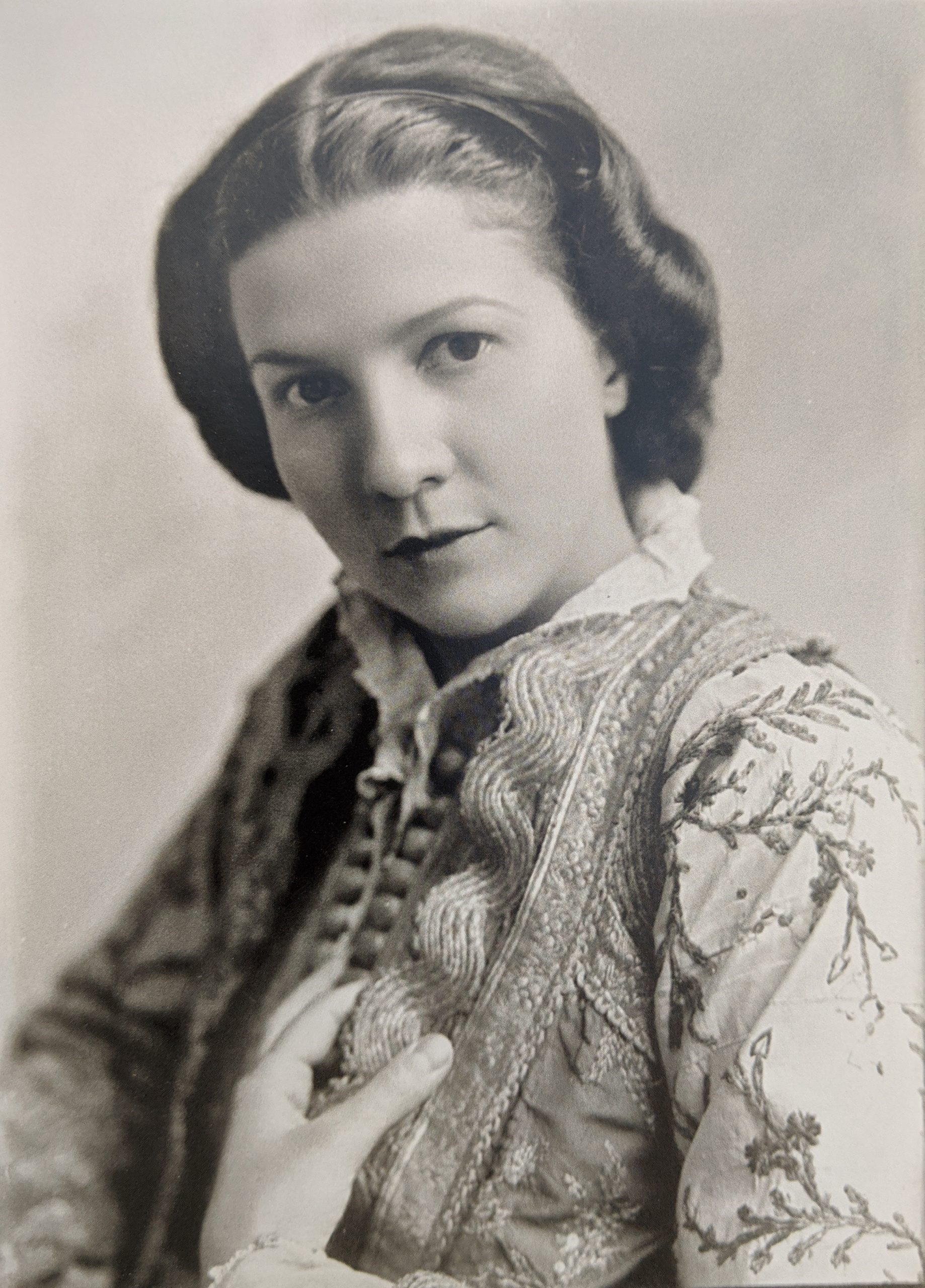
Sabiha Kasimati

- 16 January - Ndoc Nikaj, priest, historian, and writer (Shoqnia Bashkimi), died in prison
- 25 February:
  - Njazi Islami, military leader and communist politician, shot
  - Jonuz Kaceli, businessman and martyr of the 1951 executions in Albania
- 26 February:
  - Anton Delhysa, construction manager and martyr of the 1951 executions in Albania
  - Gafur Jegeni, anti-fascist military officer and martyr of the 1951 executions in Albania
  - Manush Peshkëpia, Balli Kombëtar activist, poet and martyr of the 1951 executions in Albania
  - Qemal Kasoruho, civil servant, economist and martyr of the 1951 executions in Albania
  - Sabiha Kasimati, one of the first female scientists in Albania, icythyologist and martyr of the 1951 executions in Albania
  - Zyhdi Herri, journalist and martyr of the 1951 executions in Albania
- 2 March - Sali Ormeni, 20th director of the Albanian State Police and Albanian Army colonel, assassinated
- 5 November - Jul Bonati - Jesuit, scholar, translator and one of the 38 martyrs of Albania killed during Enver Hoxha's reign
