= Dashnor =

- Gender: Male

Origin
- Region of origin: Albania, Kosovo

Dashnor is an Albanian masculine given name and may refer to:

- Dashnor Bajaziti (born 1955), Albanian footballer
- Dashnor Dume (born 1963), Albanian footballer and coach
- Dashnor Kastrioti (born 1974), Albanian footballer
- Dashnor Kokonozi (born 1951), Albanian journalist and writer
- Dashnor Shehi, Albanian politician and government minister
- Dashnor Sula (born 1969), Albanian politician and jurist
