= 1949 in Albania =

- Decades: 1920s; 1930s; 1940s; 1950s; 1960s
- See also: Other events of 1949; List of years in Albania

The following lists events that happened during 1949 in the People's Republic of Albania.

== Incumbents ==
- First Secretary: Enver Hoxha
- Chairman of the Presidium of the People's Assembly: Omer Nishani
- Prime Minister: Enver Hoxha
