= 1944 in Albania =

- Decades: 1920s; 1930s; 1940s; 1950s; 1960s
- See also: Other events of 1944; List of years in Albania

The following lists events that happened during 1944 in the People's Republic of Albania.

== Incumbents ==
- President: Mehdi Frashëri, Chairman of the High Council (until 28 November), Omer Nishani, Chairman of the Presidium (starting 26 May)
- Prime Minister: Rexhep Bej Mitrovica (until 18 July), Fiqri Dine (18 July - 29 August), Ibrahim Biçakçiu (29 August - 28 November), Enver Hoxha (starting 22 October)

== Events ==
January

- The National Liberation Movement, supplied with British weapons, gained control of southern Albania.

May

- The Communists met to organize an Albanian government and appointed Hoxha chairman of the executive committee and supreme commander of the National Liberation Movement.

October

- Communists establish provisional government with Hoxha as Prime Minister.

November

- The Communists entered the capital in the wake of a German withdrawal.

December

- Communist provisional government adopts laws allowing state regulation of commercial enterprises, foreign and domestic trade.

== Births ==
- 12 January - Fatos Kongoli, writer
- 17 August - Rexhep Meidani, politician, former President of Albania
- 6 September - Skënder Hyka, footballer
- 15 October - Sali Berisha, cardiologist and politician, former President and Prime minister of Albania

== Deaths ==
- 23 January - Rauf Fico, diplomat and politician
- February - Fuat Dibra, politician
- 1 February - Vasil Shanto, one of the founders of the Albanian Communist Party
- 5 March - Ismail Ndroqi, politician and philosopher
- 7 August - Skënder Muço, lawyer and leader of Balli Kombëtar
- September - Llazar Fundo, communist, later social-democratic journalist and writer
