= 1947 in Albania =

- Decades: 1920s; 1930s; 1940s; 1950s; 1960s
- See also: Other events of 1947; List of years in Albania

The following lists events that happened during 1947 in the People's Republic of Albania.

== Incumbents ==
- President: Omer Nishani, Chairman of the Presidium of the Constituent Assembly
- Prime Minister: Enver Hoxha

== Events ==
=== February ===
- 10 February - United Nations Security Council Resolution 17 is passed.
- 27 February - United Nations Security Council Resolution 19 is passed. It creates a three-member subcommittee to examine the dispute over the Straits of Corfu between the United Kingdom and Albania and to make a report on these facts.

=== April ===
- 9 April - United Nations Security Council Resolution 22 recommends that the United Kingdom and Albania take their dispute over the Straits of Corfu to the International Court of Justice.
