= 1950 in Albania =

- Decades: 1930s; 1940s; 1950s; 1960s; 1970s
- See also: Other events of 1950; List of years in Albania

The following lists events that happened during 1950 in the People's Republic of Albania.

== Incumbents ==
- First Secretary: Enver Hoxha
- Chairman of the Presidium of the People's Assembly: Omer Nishani
- Prime Minister: Enver Hoxha

== Events ==
Ongoing — Albanian–Yugoslav border conflict (1948–1954)

=== January to April ===
- March–May - 1950 Albanian Cup

=== May to August ===
- 24 May - Clashes between Albanian forces and Greek forces in Gramos killed six Albanian soldiers and left seven more injured.
- 28 May - 1950 Albanian parliamentary election: the Democratic Front won the election with 99.4% of votes

== Births ==
- 27 January - Agim Qirjaqi, television director, actor
- 3 February - Françesk Radi, singer-songwriter and composer
- 23 July - Mustafa Arapi, painter and art restorer
- 27 July - Zef Deda, comedian and stage actor dubbed as the "Charlie Chaplin of Albania"
- 5 August - Kujtim Çashku, film director and screenwriter (Kolonel Bunker)
- 4 October - Lejla Agolli, composer
- 12 October - Liljana Kondakçi, singer and actress
- 27 December - Esat Teliti, filmmaker and producer

== Deaths ==
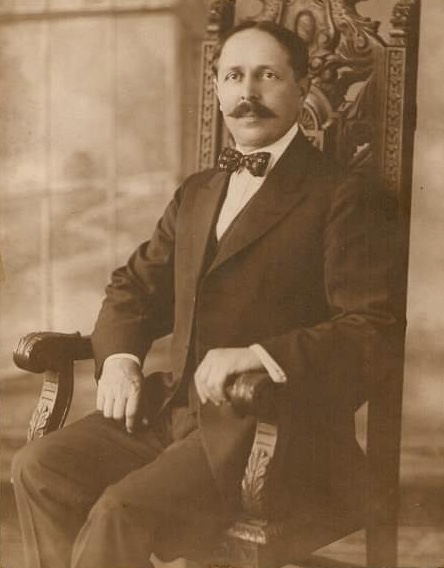
Spiridon Ilo

- 11 April - Aristidh Ruçi, one of the founding fathers of Albania, politician and founder of the Albanian nationalist group Labëria Club, died in prison
- 12 April - Pal Mëlyshi - LANÇ activist and Sigurimi member
- 16 April - Gaspër Suma - priest and one of the 38 martyrs of Albania killed during Enver Hoxha's reign
- 7 September - Spiridon Ilo, one of the founding fathers of Albania and nationalist politician
- 24 October - Maria Tuci, laywoman and one of the 38 martyrs of Albania killed during Enver Hoxha's reign
- 24 December - Alush Lleshanaku, LANÇ soldier and teacher, shot
