= If I Were a Boy (disambiguation) =

"If I Were a Boy" is a song by American singer-songwriter Beyoncé.

If I Were a Boy may also refer to:

- If I Were a Boy (film), a 2017 film directed by Audrey Dana
- If I Were a Boy (novel), an Albanian epistolary novel written by Haki Stërmilli
