= 1945 in Albania =

- Decades: 1920s; 1930s; 1940s; 1950s; 1960s
- See also: Other events of 1945; List of years in Albania

The following lists events that happened during 1945 in the People's Republic of Albania.

== Incumbents ==
- President: Omer Nishani, Chairman of the Presidium of the Constituent Assembly
- Prime Minister: Enver Hoxha, Chairmen of the Council of Ministers

== Events ==
- January
  - Communist provisional government agrees to restore Kosovo to Yugoslavia as an autonomous region
  - tribunals begin to condemn thousands of "war criminals" and "enemies of the people" to death or to prison
  - Communist regime begins to nationalize industry, transportation, forests, pastures.
- April – Yugoslavia recognizes communist government in Albania
- November
  - Soviet Union recognizes provisional government
  - Britain and United States make full diplomatic recognition conditional

== Births ==
- 1 March - Xhevahir Spahiu, writer
- 9 March - Llazi Sërbo, movie and theater actor, director
- 5 May - Saimir Kumbaro, film director

== Deaths ==
- 1 March - Luigj Bumçi, catholic religious and political figure
- 14 April - Fejzi Alizoti, politician
- 18 April - William, Prince of Albania
- 3 July - Sotir Kolea, folklorist, diplomat and activist of the Albanian National Awakening
- Bahri Omari, politician, publisher and writer
- Thanas Floqi, educator and patriot, and one of the signatories of the Albanian Declaration of Independence
