= Izet Duraku =

Izet Duraku is director of the National Centre of Cultural Property Inventory (NCCPI) in Albania which exists to register the cultural heritage of Albania. The organisation was set up by Dashnor Kokonozi in the early 1990s after the breakdown of law and order in Albania following the ousting of the Communist regime led to looting of cultural heritage objects.
