= 1946 in Albania =

- Decades: 1920s; 1930s; 1940s; 1950s; 1960s
- See also: Other events of 1946; List of years in Albania

The following lists events that happened during 1946 in the People's Republic of Albania.

== Incumbents ==
- President: Omer Nishani, Chairman of the Presidium of the Constituent Assembly
- Prime Minister: Enver Hoxha, Chairmen of the Council of Ministers

== Events ==
=== January ===
- January 11 - The People's Republic of Albania was proclaimed at noon (11:00 GMT), with Communist leader Enver Hoxha as the nation's Prime Minister. Two months later, a new constitution proclaimed Hoxha's Albanian Workers Party to be the sole force, and Marxism–Leninism as the ideology, of the People's Socialist Republic of Albania.
