= Veronica Gentili =

Italian journalist, television presenter and actress

- Born: July 9, 1982 (age 42); Rome, Lazio, Italy
- Occupations: Television presenter; actress; journalist
- Years active: 1999–present
- Height: 1.70 m (5 ft 7 in)

Veronica Gentili (born 9 July 1982) is an Italian television presenter, journalist, and actress.

== Biography ==
Gentili was born in Rome on 9 July 1982. She is the daughter of painter Netta Vespignani, the former wife of painter Renzo Vespignani. In 2006, she graduated from Accademia Nazionale di Arte Drammatica Silvio D'Amico and began working in film, television and theatre. She made her debut as an actress in 1999 in Gabriele Muccino's film Come te nessuno mai. In 2015, she became a freelance journalist but already began to have notoriety starting from 2013 as a guest of Piazzapulita on La7. In 2016, she started writing for Fatto Quotidiano and became a regular guest of La Gabbia, L'Aria Che Tira and Coffee break which broadcast on La7. In 2018, she became co-host of the Stasera Italia program broadcast on Rete 4, as well as commenting on the Italian political elections. Every weekend she presents on Rete 4 on the Stasera Italia Weekend program, while during the summer, presents on Stasera Italia Estate every day.

== Filmography ==
=== Film ===
Year	Title	Role(s)	Notes
1999	But Forever in My Mind	Francesca	
2007	Family Game	Secretary	Uncredited
2007	Miss F	Cecilia	
2009	The Red Shadows	Rossana	
2011	Passannante	Margherita of Savoy	
2011	Tempus	Caterina	Short film
2011	Balkan Bazaar	Orsola	
2013	Third Person	Flower Seller	Cameo
2013	ReWined	Miriam Poggiolini	
2015	House of Shells	Vivien	Short film

=== Television ===
Year	Title	Role(s)	Notes
2006	Don Matteo	Chiara Nardi	Episode: "Legittima difesa"
2008–2010	Romanzo Criminale: The Series	Vanessa	3 episodes
2011	Inspector Rex	Laura Lorenzi	Episode: "Il terzo uomo"
2011	Viso d'angelo	Veronica Capasso	Main role
2012	R.I.S. Roma	Antonella Maresani	Episode: "Topi da laboratorio"
2013–2014	Piazzapulita	Herself / Opinionist	Talk show (season 3)
2016–2017	Coffee Break	Herself / Opinionist	Talk show (season 6)
2017–2018	L'aria che tira	Herself / Opinionist	Talk show (season 7)
2017	Sei in un Paese meraviglioso	Herself / Co-host	Information program (season 3)
2018	TG4	Herself / Reporter	News report
2018–2021	Stasera Italia	Herself / Host	Talk show (season 1-4)
2021–2023	Controcorrente	Herself / Host	Talk show
2023–present	Le Iene	Herself / Host	Variety show (season 27-present)
2025	L'isola dei famosi	Herself / Host	Reality show (season 19)
