= Balkan Bazaar =

2011 film by Edmond Budina

- Poster
- Directed by: Edmond Budina
- Written by: Edmond Budina
- Starring: Catherine Wilkening; Veronica Gentili
- Cinematography: Daniele Baldacci
- Edited by: Marzia Mette
- Music by: Admir Shkurtaj
- Production companies: Erafilm; Mediaplex Italia
- Distributed by: Erafilm
- Release date: April 14, 2011 (Tirana)
- Running time: 91 minutes
- Country: Albania
- Languages: Albanian; Greek
- Budget: €600,000

Balkan Bazaar (Albanian: Ballkan Bazar) is a 2011 Albanian and Italian comedy film written and directed by Edmond Budina. Catherine Wilkening and Veronica Gentili star in the film. Budina, inspired by the exhumation of Albanian graves in 2006, wrote a screenplay that was produced by Erafilm and Mediaplex Italia with funding from the National Center of Cinematography, Qendra Kinematografike e Kosovës, and the Italian Ministry of Culture.

== Plot ==
Jolie, a Frenchwoman, and her Italian daughter Orsola become involved in the business of selling bones in the Balkans after the bones of her father and grandfather are taken to southern Albania.

== Cast ==
- Catherine Wilkening as Jolie
- Veronica Gentili as Orsola

== Production ==
Edmond Budina was inspired by events in 2006, in which the graves of Albanian women and children were opened as counted as those of Greek soldiers killed in World War II. Balkan Bazaar was written and directed by Budina. The National Center of Cinematography, Qendra Kinematografike e Kosovës, and the Italian Ministry of Culture provided funding for the film, which had a budget of €600,000.

The film was a co-production between the Erafilm of Albania and Mediaplex Italia of Italy. Daniele Baldacci oversaw the cinematography, Admir Shkurtaj composed the music, and Marzia Mette edited the film. 35 mm movie film was used to shoot the film. Dialogue is spoken in Albanian, Greek, English, French, Italian, and Macedonian.

== Release ==
Erafilm distributed Balkan Bazaar domestically in Albania and worldwide and premiered in Tirana on 14 April 2011. It was shown at the Karlovy Vary International Film Festival, Sofia International Film Festival, Prishtina International Film Festival, and Alexandria International Film Festival.

Omonoia, an organization for the Greek minority in Albania, criticized the film as "another shameful challenge that ignores the Orthodox community". The organization stated that the feed was supporting "religious hatred and racism".

== Works cited ==
- "Balkan Bazaar". Cinecittà. Archived from the original on 5 April 2025.
- "Balkan Bazaar". Erafilm. Archived from the original on 5 April 2025.
- "Omonia attacks the film Balkan Bazaar". Shqipëria. 2011. Archived from the original on 5 April 2025.
- Mile, Alma (15 April 2011). ""Balkan Bazar", the story behind Kosina". Panorama. Archived from the original on 23 April 2011.
