= Dashnor Kastrioti =

Albanian footballer

Personal information
- Full name: Dashnor Kastrioti
- Date of birth: 30 November 1974 (age 51)
- Place of birth: Albania
- Position: Forward

Senior career*
Years	Team	Apps	(Gls)
199x–199x	FSG Schiffweiler	?	(?)

International career
1996	Albania	1	(0)
- * Club domestic league appearances and goals

Dashnor Kastrioti (born 30 November 1974) is an Albanian former footballer.

== International career ==
Kastrioti played his first and only game for Albania in an April 1996 friendly match against Bosnia and Hercegovina. It proved to be his only international game.
