= Haxhi Lleshi =

Albanian military leader and communist politician

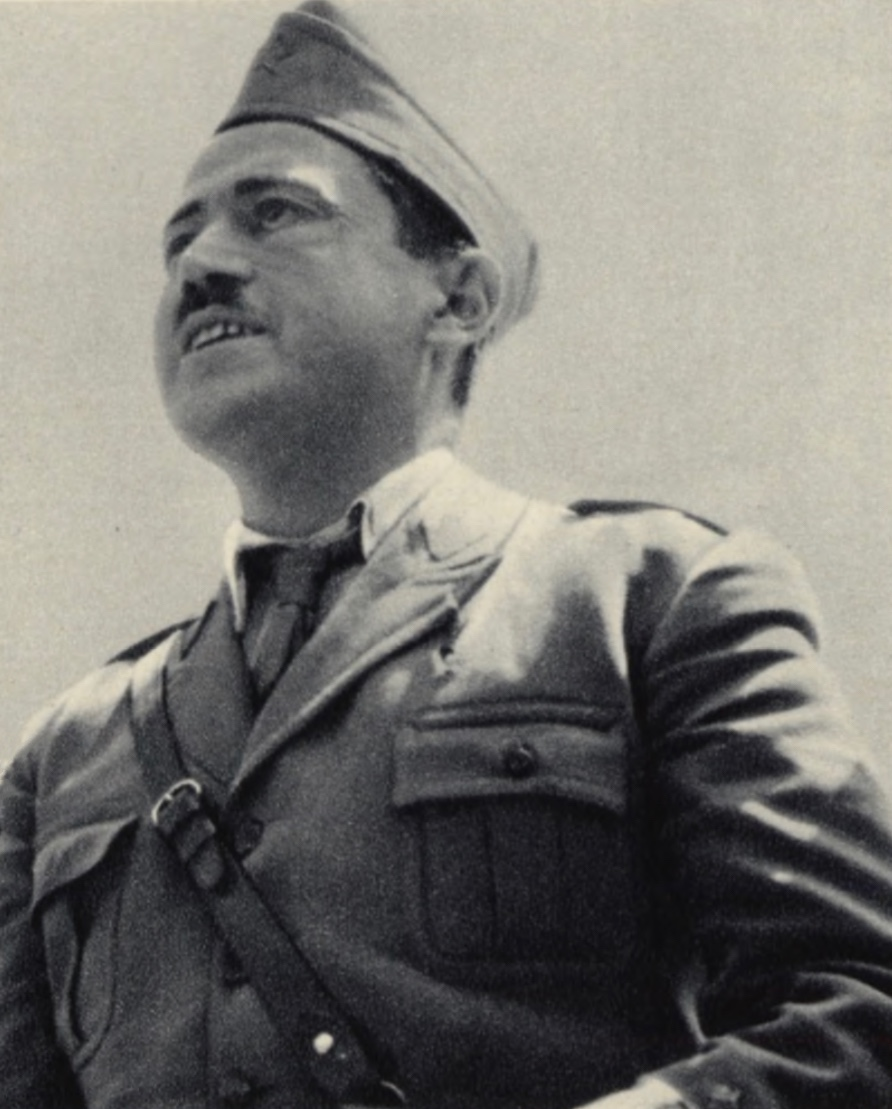
- Lleshi in 1945

Chairman of the Presidium of the People's Assembly
- In office 1 August 1953 – 22 November 1982
- Leader: Enver Hoxha (First Secretary)
- Preceded by: Omer Nishani
- Succeeded by: Ramiz Alia

Minister of Internal Affairs
- In office 22 October 1944 – 23 March 1946
- Prime Minister: Enver Hoxha
- Preceded by: Ibrahim Biçaku
- Succeeded by: Koçi Xoxe

Personal details
- Born: 1 May 1913 Reshan, Dibër County, Republic of Central Albania
- Died: 1 January 1998 (aged 84) Tirana, Albania
- Party: Party of Labour of Albania

Haxhi Lleshi (1 May 1913 – 1 January 1998) was an Albanian military leader and communist politician who served as the Chairman of the Presidium of the People's Assembly of the People's Socialist Republic of Albania from 1953 to 1982.

== Biography ==
He was born to a Gheg Muslim Albanian family in Dibër, north-central Albania.

In the 1920s he worked as a shepherd in his homeland. As part of the anti-Zogist movement in 1922, Lleshi's family fled to the Kingdom of Yugoslavia, where they settled in Debar, and later in Banjishte near Debar. From 1926 to 1931 he attended elementary school, then attended a grammar school in Albania and the second and third stages in the Serbo-Croatian language city of Debar.

With the Italian invasion of Albania, Lleshi and his émigré friend Myslim Peza were sent to Albania. Lleshi received financial aid from the Yugoslavs, part of which went to sponsor the scattered anti-Italian activities in Albania; most notorious was the guerrilla unit known as "Çeta of Peza" (Albanian: Çeta e Pezës).

On the eve of the German invasion of Yugoslavia, several paramilitary units (mostly Albanians) backed by the Yugoslav army crossed the border and attacked the Italian positions, badly organized and prepared, in two directions: near Shkodër and near Pogradec (Qafë Thanë). Haxhi Lleshi, leading 200 men, together with his uncle Aqif Lleshi, leading 100 men (both reporting to colonel Gojko Jovanović), crossed the border and positioned from Ostren i Vogël to Bllatë. The fast advancement of the Nazi army caused the Yugoslav insurgency to fail; the units retreated to Yugoslavia where Lleshi was involved and fought alongside the Yugoslav army in the failed short attempt at stopping the Germans from entering Debar.

Lleshi was one of the top commanders in Albania's fight against the Italians and Germans during World War II. When a Communist-dominated government was set up in Albania in 1944, Lleshi became interior minister and served in that position from 1944 to 1946. His name was mentioned in a CIA report of 1952 as a Yugoslavian informant, together with Myslym Peza. In the report, it was Haxhi and Aqif Lleshi who misled Yugoslavian militia by mistranslating the CIA agent which in turn prevented him from entering Albania for the purpose of government disruption and destabilization of Albania.

On 1 August 1953, Lleshi became Chairman of the Presidium of the People's Assembly of Albania, a post equivalent to that of president. He was nominally the third most powerful man in Albania, behind general secretary Enver Hoxha and prime minister Mehmet Shehu. During Lleshi's time in power, Albania became known as one of the most independent communist nations, as it feuded with the Soviet Union, became an ally of the People's Republic of China, and then feuded with China in the 1970s.

Lleshi retired from his position as chairman of the Presidium on 22 November 1982, after nearly 30 years in office, when Hoxha reshuffled the government. Hoxha died three years later.

== Personal life ==
He was married to Haxhire Lleshi Jegeni who came from a well-known Albanian nationalist family in Debar then Jugoslavia which led to his divorce after 40 years of marriage in 1976 under pressure from Enver Hoxha leading her being interned together with their son Reshit Lleshi in the village Mollas of Elbasan. This was part of Labour Party of Albania propaganda to promote class war and vanguardism internally of communist leadership.

== After fall of regime ==
During the early 1990s, the communist regime fell, but Lleshi continued to live in Albania. On 13 February 1995, President of Albania Sali Berisha issued decree N. 1018 – on the abolition of all awards and honorary titles awarded to the leaders of the communist regime. This decision affected Enver Hoxha (posthumously), Nexhmije Hoxha (lifetime), Hysni Kapo (posthumously), Shefqet Peçi (lifetime), Gogo Nushi (posthumously), Spiro Koleka (lifetime), Haki Toska (posthumously), Haxhi Lleshi (lifetime). Thus, Lleshi was stripped of the title of People's Hero. Although Lleshi was re elected to the parliament after the end of the Communist regime, in the multi party elections, in 1996, a group of high-ranking Sigurimi functionaries were brought to trial on charges of "genocide and crimes against humanity." The sentences were harsh, including the death penalty, but soon the charges were softened. 83 year old Haxhi Lleshi was sentenced to life imprisonment, but a month later, on 24 July 1996, he was released on bail, taking into account age and health

== Death ==
In 1998, he died from natural causes.

Political offices
Preceded by Omer Nishani	Chairman of the Presidium of the People's Assembly of Albania; 1 August 1953–22 November 1982	Succeeded by Ramiz Alia
