= Hajdar Muneka =

Albanian journalist and diplomat (1954–2022)

Hajdar Muneka (20 March 1954 – 5 May 2022) was an Albanian journalist and diplomat.

== Education ==
Hajdar Muneka received a Chinese language degree from the Beijing Language and Culture University, Beijing, China. He also had a master's degree in Journalism, University of Tirana, Albania.

== Career ==
Starting in 1979, Hajdar Muneka served as journalist covering European Affairs at Albanian Radio Television, Radio Televizioni Shqiptar, in Tirana.

Muneka began his diplomatic career in 1991, when he became a Desk Officer at the Ministry of Foreign Affairs of Albania and latter First Secretary of the Embassy of Albania in Beijing, China. In 1997, he was appointed Ambassador Extraordinary and Plenipotentiary of the Republic of Albania in Beijing, China. In the same time Hajdar Muneka was appointed ambassador designate to Japan, South Korea, Australia, New Zealand, and Singapore. In 2001 Muneka was appointed Head of Mission of the Embassy of Albania in Kuala Lumpur, Malaysia.

Muneka was the co-founder of the Council of Albanian Ambassadors.
