= Enver Maloku =

Kosovar Albanian journalist and writer

Enver Maloku (2 February 1954, Podujevë – 11 January 1999) was a Kosovar Albanian journalist and writer and head of the Kosovo Information Centre. He was killed in Pristina on 11 January 1999.
