= Ylli Pango =

Albanian academic

Ylli Pango (born on 26 March 1952 in Tirana) is an Albanian psychologist, academic, writer, and politician.

== Education ==
Pango completed studies in mathematics at the University of Tirana, and later completed a postgraduate in psychology at the same university. He later completed graduate studies in education administration at Boston University through the Fulbright Program in 1994–1995.

== Career and Controversy ==
Pango became the Deputy Minister of Education for Albania from 1992–1994, as well as Vice president of Higher Commission of Scientific Qualification of Albania and Vice president of National Committee of UNICEF of Albania.

He then lectured at the University of Tirana from 1997–1999, also serving as Head of Leading Committee of Albanian State Radio Television. He became dean of the university's Faculty of Social Sciences from 1999–2005, as well as serving as Political Counselor to the Albanian president from 2002 onwards.

He served as the Elected Depute of District nr.38 Tirana, Member of the Albanian Parliament-Deputy Head of Media and Education Committee from 2005–2009, and in 2007 became the Minister of Tourism, Culture, Youth and Sports of Albania.

As of 2010 Pango is the General Executive Director of Albanian Agency of Research, Technology and Innovation.

== Publications ==
- Psychology of Child think, (1987)
- Statistic methods on Psychology (1985)
- Secrets of memory (1990)
- America (1996)
- Social Psychology (1998)
- The ruin (1994)
- Civic education –education for democracy
- Prostitution- an open wound of Albanian society (2002)
- Problems of organization and methodology of sociology and psychology research.
- Psychology of school youngsters (Articles, studies, presentations).
- Mid term Plan for education sector (Research director) (1993)
- High education in Europe. (1994) (Coauthor and author of the chapter "High Education in Albania"). Publication of Council of Europe. (1992–1993)
- Crime-Articles and Essays-2003 (130 pages)
- Psychotherapy-A diagnostic and treatment Manual for Psychological Disorders (870 pages) (2004)
- Scandal (2010)-Essays on Albanian moral. (2010) (120 pages)
- Vip –Essays (2010) (170 pages)

Additionally, Pango has written about 500 editorials and studies on psychology, social work, sociology and education.

Prof. Dr. Ylli Pango - Official site - Faqe zyrtare
