= Lejla Agolli =

Albanian composer (born 1950)

- Born: 4 October 1950 (age 75); Korçë, Albania
- Occupation: Composer

Lejla Agolli (born 4 October 1950) is an Albanian composer.

== Early life ==
Agolli was born in Korçë, Albania.

== Education ==
Agolli studied composition and orchestration in Tiranassa Tish Daijan.

== Career ==
Agolli was winner of the National Civic Song Festival for the song Ah ky mall sung by Frederik Ndoci. Agolli served for several years as artistic director to The National Ensemble of Folk Songs and Dancing.

== Works ==
Agolli's compositions include cantata, symphonies, concertos and chamber music. Selected works include:

- Ah ky mall
- Fantasy for violin and orchestra
- In Memoriam for solo clarinet and string orchestra, dedicated to Mother Teresa
- Poema for violin and orchestra
- Rondo No.1 for violin and orchestra
- Rondo No.2 for violin and orchestra
- Violin concerto No.1
- Violin concerto No.2

== Filmography ==
- 1976 Majlinda dhe zogu i vogël - Composer. Animation short.
- 1976 Lisharsi - Composer. Animation short.
