= Žirovnica =

Žirovnica may refer to:

- Municipality:
  - Municipality of Žirovnica, a municipality in Slovenia
- Settlements:
  - Žerovnica, a settlement in the Municipality of Cerknica, Slovenia, formerly also known as Žirovnica
  - Žirovnica, Žirovnica, a settlement in the Municipality of Žirovnica, Slovenia
  - Žirovnica, Sevnica, a settlement in the Municipality of Sevnica, Slovenia
  - Žirovnica, Idrija, a settlement in the Municipality of Idrija, Slovenia
  - Žirovnica, Serbia, a settlement in the Municipality of Batočina, Serbia
  - Žirovnica, Mavrovo and Rostuša, a village in the Municipality of Mavrovo and Rostuša, Republic of Macedonia
- Rivers:
  - Žirovnica (river), Idrija
  - Žirovnica (river), Žiri
