= Vasiliev Nini =

Albanian-born American sculptor (born 1954)

- Born: 1954 (age 71–72); Gjirokastra, Albania
- Known for: Monumental sculpture

Vasiliev "Vas" Nini (born 1954, Gjirokastra, Albania) is an Albanian-born American sculptor and fine artist based in Columbus, Ohio.

He is recognized internationally for figurative monumental sculpture in materials including marble, granite, stone, bronze, wood, and chrome. Nini trained at the premier fine arts institutions in Albania and worked for decades as a sculptor, educator, and media personality before immigrating to the United States in 2002.

His public sculpture commissions span Albania, Kosovo, Montenegro, Italy, the Netherlands, and across the United States. He is perhaps best known in the US for his multiple monumental statues of Blessed Mother Teresa and for large-scale public monuments at institutions including Texas A&M University.

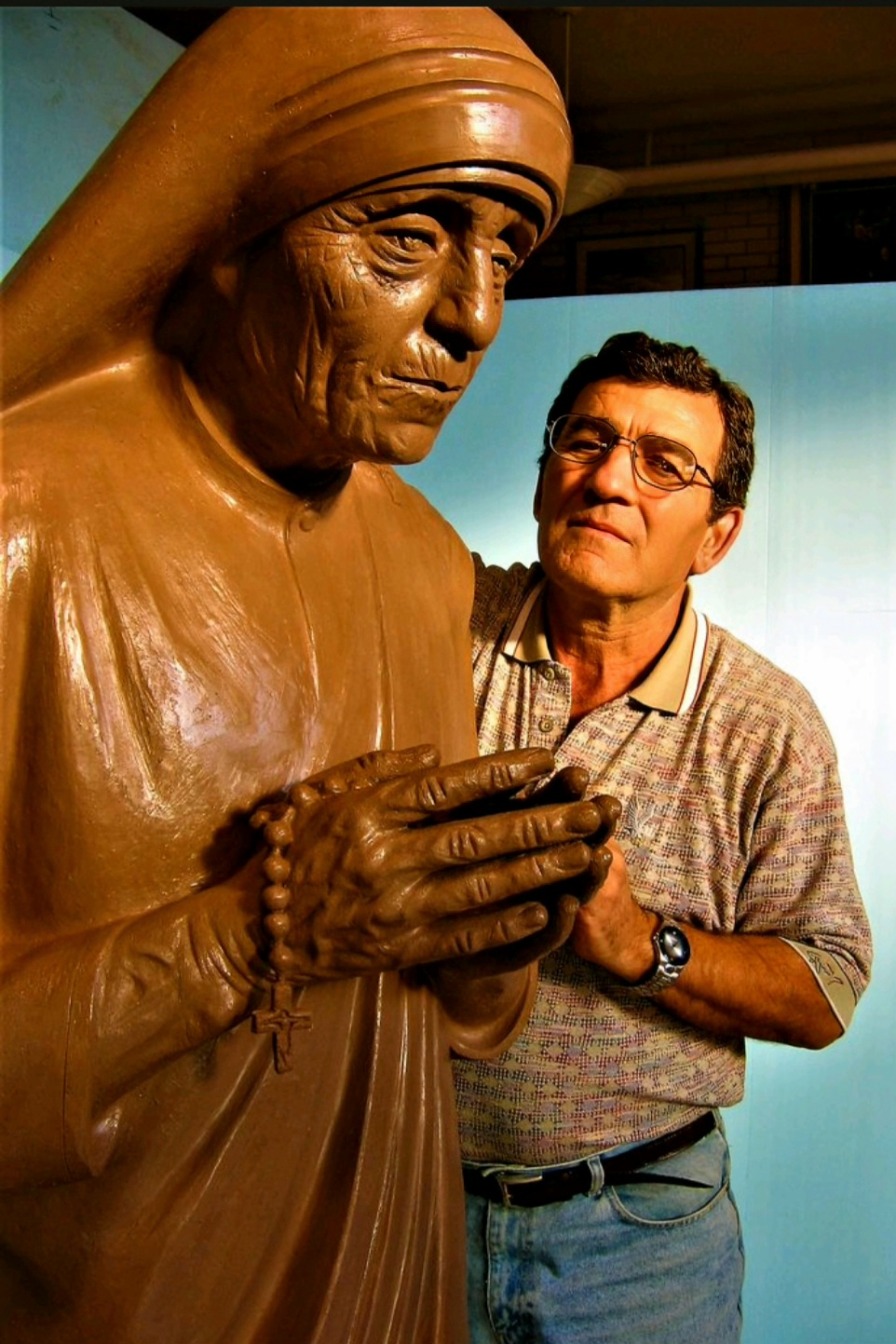
Sculptor Vasiliev Nini carefully examines the hands of his life-size clay statue of Mother Teresa, complete with rosary beads, during the creation process.

== Education ==
After completing his secondary education, Nini pursued advanced study in sculpture at the Academy of Beaux Arts (Academy of Arts) in Tirana, Albania — the country's leading institution for fine arts training. Between 1974 and 1979 he completed both a Bachelor of Fine Arts (BFA) and a Master of Fine Arts (MFA) with a specialization in Monumental Sculpture, graduating with a distinguished academic record that included victories in numerous national design competitions. His formal training encompassed classical drawing, painting, and all major sculptural traditions, from realism to abstraction, and across all principal materials.

== Early Life and Background ==
Nini was born in 1954 in Gjirokastra, a UNESCO World Heritage city in southern Albania known historically as a center of culture and intellectualism. He demonstrated an early aptitude for the visual arts and was accepted into Jordan Misja High School in Tirana, the top-ranked fine arts institution in Albania, where he specialized in sculpture and graduated with honors in 1973, receiving recognition for design excellence.

== Career in Albania (1979-2002) ==
Early Career and Institutional Roles

Following his graduation in 1979, Nini established himself rapidly within the Albanian art establishment. From 1984 to 1992, he served as a Fine Arts Specialist at the Center for the Implementation of Art Works in Tirana, one of the state institutions responsible for commissioning and executing public art across Albania. In parallel, from 1989 to 1994, he taught as a Sculpture Lecturer in Tirana.

In 1992, Nini became an on-air personality for Albanian Radio-TV in Tirana, reflecting both his public profile and his commitment to arts education and public engagement. From 1997 to 2002 he served as Chief Lecturer in Figurative Arts at the Academy of Fine Arts in Tirana — his most senior academic appointment — while continuing to accept private commissions.

Awards and National Recognition

Throughout his years in Albania, Nini received multiple national honors. He won awards for sculpture at the National Art Gallery in Tirana in 1981, 1983, and 1985. In 1986 he took first place in the National Competition for Park Sculpture in Tirana, and in 1996 he won first place in the National Competition for the Monument of the Overthrowing of the Dictatorship in Tirana — one of the most prominent post-communist memorial commissions in Albania.

His work from this period was acquired by Queen Beatrix of the Netherlands as part of her private collection, establishing his early international reach.

Major Albanian Commissions

Nini's Albanian commissions include significant monumental public works on behalf of the Ministry of Education, the Albanian League of Writers and Artists, and other state bodies. Key works include:

- 1981 – Triptych, Museum Ersekë, Albania (bronze, 9m × 3m × 70cm) — a major early monumental commission
- 1982 – Monument of Helmes, Skrapar, Albania (artificial stone, 8m tall) — co-authored
- 1983 – Champion, National Park, Albania
- 1985 – Kordelja (Ribbon), monument dedicated to the Women's Institute, Tirana (bronze and artificial stone, 4m tall) — co-authored
- 1986 – A Woman Singer, park sculpture, Tirana (bronze)
- 1987 – WWII Monument, Gjirokastër, Albania
- 1988 – A Woman Swimmer, National Park Sports Center, Tirana (bronze, 2.5m)
- 1992 – Memorial to the martyrs of Palokaster Village, Gjirokastra (artificial stone, 3.5m)
- 1995 – Shqiponjë (Eagle), Acquaformosa, Italy — representing his early transnational commissions
- 1996 – Albanian Flag, Catanzaro, Italy
- 1997 – Mother Theresa monument, Tuzi, Montenegro
- 1999 – Monument of Jakov Xoxe, Fier, Albania (granite and bronze, 3m)
- 1999 – Mother Albania, Queen Beatrix Private Collection, The Netherlands
- 2000 – Commandant Kumanova, Pristina, Kosovo

== Career in the United States (2002-Present) ==
In 2002, Nini immigrated to the United States with his wife and daughter, settling initially in Omaha, Nebraska. He has described this chapter of his life as a pursuit of the American Dream while maintaining the artistic ambitions and classical standards he developed over more than two decades in Albania. On July 2, 2007, he became a naturalized U.S. citizen, retaining dual Albanian-American citizenship.

Nebraska Period (2002–2007)

During his years in Omaha, Nini established himself in the local arts community while pursuing commissioned works. He organized private fine arts instruction and participated in group and solo exhibitions, including at the Louisville Art Gallery in Louisville, Nebraska (2003 and 2004), Bellevue University (2004), the Hot Shop Art Center (2004–2005), and the Embassy of Albania in Washington, D.C. (2005). Among his American commissions from this period:

- 2004 – Louis and Clark, Council Bluffs, Iowa
- 2005 – Energy, Omaha, Nebraska
- 2005 – Mother Teresa statue for the Albanian Embassy, Washington, D.C.
- 2006 – Wedding Dress monument, Omaha, Nebraska

Ohio Period and Expanding Commissions (2007–Present)

After relocating to Ohio, Nini continued an active schedule of monumental commissions across the United States. He operated a private studio in Zanesville, Ohio, and later settled in Columbus. Among his most significant American works:

- 2007 – WWI Dough-Boy, Texas A&M University, Texas (bronze) — a monumental soldier sculpture for a major research university
- 2007 – Granville Girl, Granville, Ohio (bronze, life-size)
- 2008 – Grey Hound Race, Wheeling, West Virginia (relief)
- 2008 – Angelo Falconi monument, Washington, Pennsylvania (bronze) — co-authored
- 2009 – Mother Theresa, Klina, Kosovo (bronze, 2.1m)
- 2009 – 10 Saints, San Antonio Cathedral, Texas — series of ten life-size bronze alto-relief figures of saints
- 2010 – Mother Theresa, Rochester Hills (Detroit), Michigan (bronze, 2.05m)
- 2013 – Mother Theresa, New York City, New York
- 2022 – Themistokli Gërmenji, Korçë, Albania
- 2024 – Skanderbeg, Selami Museum, Vlorë, Albania

Additional works include a 54-foot graphite pencil mural at Arch City Tavern at 862 North High Street in Columbus, Ohio.

Teaching and Arts Education

Education has remained central to Nini's American practice. From 2015 to the present he has served as an instructor at the Priscilla R. Tyson Cultural Arts Center in Columbus, Ohio — part of the city's network of community cultural institutions. He has also taught at the Fran Ryan Center, Whetstone Community Center, and the Columbus Performing Arts Center. In 2021, works by his students were featured in the Hard & Soft exhibition at the Cultural Arts Center's Loft Gallery, presented in conjunction with Columbus College of Art & Design (CCAD).

He also taught as a private fine arts instructor in Omaha, Nebraska from 2002 to 2007.

== Artistic Practice and Style ==
Nini describes his practice as centered on the human form — the beauty, complexity, and emotional depth of the figure. Working with mastery across Realism, Expressionism, and Abstraction, he explores the connection between form and medium. His sculpture spans a wide range of scale, from intimate handheld works to nine-meter public monuments, and he is equally at home in marble, granite, stone, bronze, wood, metal, and chrome.

In his two-dimensional work — drawing, painting, and mixed media — he approaches the picture plane with a sculptural sensibility, building up layers of material and then drawing form out of them in the same way he carves or models in three dimensions. His charcoal, graphite, pastel, and painting works on paper are considered an integral part of his practice and have been exhibited alongside his sculpture.

Recurring subjects in his work include the female figure, historical and political monuments, religious iconography (particularly the figure of Mother Teresa and Catholic saints), and commemorative public memorial sculpture.

== Exhibitions ==
Nini has exhibited widely in Albania, across Europe, and throughout the United States:

Albania

1979, 1980, 1986, 1994, 1995, 1998, 2001, 2010, 2011

Europe

1995 — Italy; 1999 — The Hague, Netherlands

United States

Nini has participated in numerous private and collective exhibitions across the United States from 2002 through 2025, including at the Louisville Art Gallery (Nebraska), Bellevue University (Nebraska), Hot Shop Art Center (Omaha), the Embassy of Albania (Washington, D.C.), the Armory Center (Zanesville, Ohio), Ohio University (Zanesville), and the Cultural Arts Center (Columbus, Ohio). His first solo exhibition in Columbus was presented at the Cultural Arts Center, where he showed unseen works in ceramics, wood, marble sculpture, reliefs, charcoal, graphite, pastel, painting, and mixed media.
