= Adriana Gjonaj =

Albanian politician

Member of the Albanian parliament
- In office 2009–2013

Personal details
- Political party: Democratic Party

Adriana Gjoni (Gjonaj) was a member of the Assembly of the Republic of Albania for the Democratic Party of Albania.
