= Dashnor Shehi =

Albanian government minister

Dashnor Shehi was the minister for labour, emigration, and social support for Albania in the 1992 government of Sali Berisha. He is a member of the Democratic Party.
