= Archaeological Museum of Durrës =

- Muzeu Arkeologjik i Durrësit
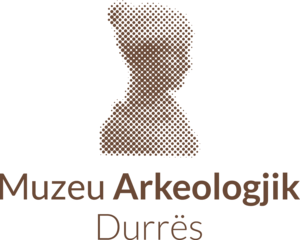

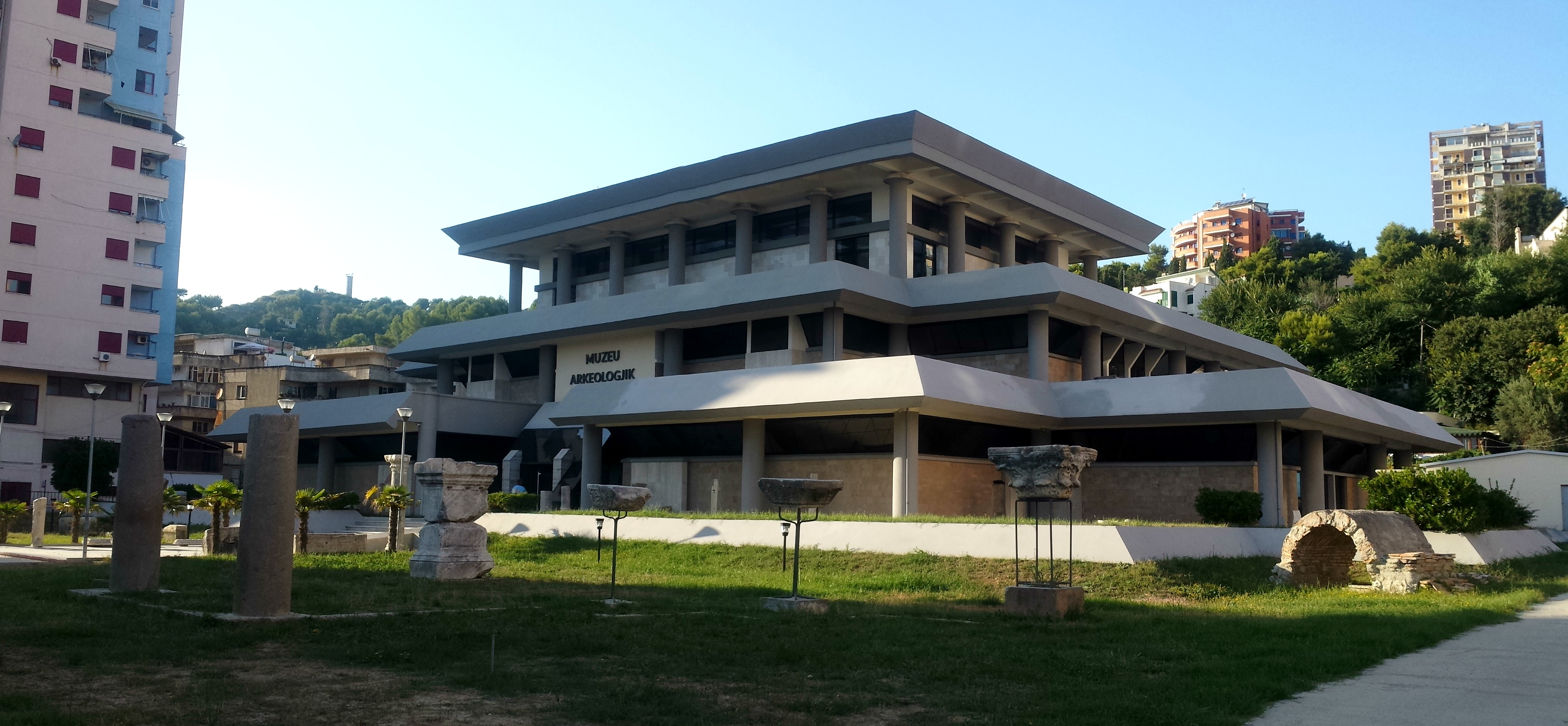
- View of the museum
- Established: 1951
- Location: Durrës, Albania
- Coordinates: 41.311389°N 19.440278°E
- Type: Archaeological Museum

The Archaeological Museum of Durrës (Albanian: Muzeu Arkeologjik i Durrësit) in Durrës, Albania, established in 1951, is the largest archaeological museum in the country. The museum is located near the beach and north of the museum are the 6th-century Byzantine walls, constructed after the Visigoth invasion of 481. The 1997 rebellion in Albania saw the museum seriously damaged and looted.

== Collection ==
The bulk of the museum consists of 3204 artifacts found in the nearby ancient site of Dyrrhachium and includes an extensive collection from the Ancient Greek, Hellenistic and Roman periods. Items of major note include Roman funeral steles and stone sarcophagi and a collection of miniature busts of Venus, testament to the time when Durrës was a centre of worship of the goddess.

== Reconstruction ==
In 2010, the Durrës Archaeological Museum is expected to undergo a total reconstruction. Despite the importance of archaeological objects, the museum is not an independent institution and is operated by the Regional Directorate of Durrës Monuments. The museum is supported by the Albanian Institute of Archaeology and the Academy of Sciences and intend it to become a national museum according to archaeologists such as Adrian Anastasi and Luan Përzhita, given the historical significance of its artifacts and their illustration rich cultural heritage.

A fund has been opened by the Ministry of Tourism, Culture, Youth and Sports to provide the museum with a new research unit, its own scientific staff and laboratory and administrative body. Problems have been identified in the reconstruction process given that the museum is located near the sea faces erosion from the iodine content of salt and moisture and weathering.

== Reopening March 2015 ==
The museum was reopened by prime minister Edi Rama on March 20, 2015, after four years of closure.

The museum is open from 9 am to 3 pm every day of the week, except Monday.
