= Fatmir Hima =

Albanian footballer

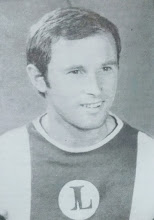
- Fatmir Hima in 1974

Personal information
- Full name: Fatmir Hima
- Date of birth: 20 April 1954 (age 72)
- Place of birth: Durrës, Albania
- Position: Striker

Youth career
- 1967–1972: Lokomotiva Durrës

Senior career*
Years	Team	Apps	(Gls)
1973–1985	Lokomotiva	324	(113)
- * Club domestic league appearances and goals

Fatmir Hima (born April 20, 1954) is a former Albanian footballer who played with the Albanian football team KS Lokomotiva (now Teuta) of the city of Durrës from 1972 to 1985.

== Honours ==
Fatmir Hima was honored by the Albanian Football Association in 2013 for his sporting activity and achievements.
