= Edmond Budina =

Albanian actor, director and writer

- Born: 21 March 1952; Tirana, Albania
- Education: Albanian Art Academy
- Occupations: Actor, director, writer
- Years active: 1974–present
- Known for: Balkan Bazaar, Letters in the Wind
- Relatives: Robert Budina (brother)

Edmond Budina (born 21 March 1952) is an Albanian actor, director and writer.

Edmond Budina (born 1952) is an Albanian actor, film director, screenwriter, playwright and writer. He has worked extensively in theatre, film and television in Albania and Italy. He has also been involved in political and cultural activities and has taught acting, speech and theatre direction.

== Early life and education ==
Budina began his artistic activities at a young age in Korçë, Albania, where he participated in the city's Pioneer House and was a member of the theatre group of the Raqi Qirinxhi High School. In 1970–1971, while still a student, he also performed with the professional variety theatre of Korçë. In 1970, he won the city's artistic speech competition. In 1971, he graduated from high school and was admitted to the Institute of Arts in Tirana, now the University of Arts. During his studies, he appeared in productions including Morsa by Luigi Pirandello, Hijet e natës by Vedat Kokona and Familja e peshkatarit by Sulejman Pitarka.

== Theatre career ==
After graduating, Budina joined the National Theatre of Albania as an actor. He performed in approximately forty theatrical productions. Among his notable roles were Professor Jani in Karnavalet e Korçës, Genti in Tymra që pastrohen, Bujar in Zonja nga qyteti, Pal in Përmbytja e madhe, Ismail Qemali in Udha e flamurit, Ferdinand von Walter in Friedrich Schiller's Intrigue and Love, Borkman in Henrik Ibsen's John Gabriel Borkman and Biff in Arthur Miller's Death of a Salesman. He also worked as a playwright and theatrical adaptor. His works include the monodramas Një natë me E… and Profeti i kokoshkave, and the comedy Shkallafepsje vëllazërore. He adapted several literary works for the stage, including Kush e solli Doruntinën, Nata me hënë, Dimri i madh, Krushqit janë të ngrirë, Nënshkrimi i stuhisë and Kamarja e turpit. As a theatre director, Budina directed productions including Nënshkrimi i stuhisë (1981), Nata me hënë (1990), Zgjimi (1992), Tabir Sarai (1994), Një natë me E. (2019) and Profeti i kokoshkave (2020). From 1975 to 1985, he directed productions in various schools and institutions in Tirana. Between 1982 and 1992, he worked as an external lecturer at the Institute of Arts, teaching acting, artistic speech and theatre direction. From 1977 to 1992, he was a member of the Artistic Council of the National Theatre. Budina also worked in radio, writing and performing radio dramatizations for programmes including Teatri në mikrofon and Heroizmi i popullit tonë në shekuj. He collaborated with Albanian Public Television (RTSH) as a presenter and actor.

== Film and television acting ==
Budina began appearing in Albanian films during the 1970s. His early film credits include Fije që priten (1976), Vajzat me kordele të kuqe (1977), Dollia e dasmës sime (1978), Ballë për ballë (1979), Nusja (1980), Vendimi (1984), Flutura në kabinën time (1988), Muri i gjallë (1989) and Shpresa (1990). He also appeared in the television films Koha nuk pret (1984) and Inxhinieri i minierës (1989). After moving to Italy, Budina continued his career as an actor in theatre, film and television. In 1996, he starred in Migranti, directed by Marco Baliani, playing the role of Ulysses. The production was performed at several major Italian theatres, including Teatro Valle in Rome, Teatro della Pergola in Florence, Piccolo Teatro in Milan, Teatro Mercadante in Naples and Teatro della Tosse in Genoa, as well as in Sarajevo. Budina was also one of the leading actors in the Albanian family storyline of Tickets (2005), the anthology film directed by Ermanno Olmi, Abbas Kiarostami and Ken Loach. He played the father of an Albanian family in the segment directed by Ken Loach. The film was presented at the 2005 Berlin International Film Festival. He appeared in the Italian television series Un posto al sole, playing the character of Petrit in approximately eighty episodes between 2000 and 2008. His other acting credits include Eccezzziunale veramente 2 (2005), Fuori mira (2014), L'Oriana (2015), Contromano (2015), Sorelle per scelta (2019), Parlate a bassa voce (2023), Come crimini e misfatti (2024) and L'eterna luce del giorno (2026). In 2005, he received the Best Actor Grand Prize at the Tangier Film Festival for his performance in Luleborë.

== Film direction ==
Budina made his directorial debut with the documentary Duke parë rikthimin (1995), which was screened at the MedFilm Festival and in Italian schools and universities. He subsequently directed the short film Domenica delle palme (2002), which was produced and broadcast by Tele+ as part of the European film project Le luci di Brindisi and was screened at the Turin Film Festival. His feature film Lettere al vento (2003) was screened at numerous international film festivals and received awards for Best Film and Best Screenplay. The film was also awarded the Italian Ministry of Culture's quality award and was distributed internationally by Lucky Red. In 2011, Budina directed Balkan Bazaar, a comedy set in the Balkans. The film achieved a theatrical release in Italy and was subsequently distributed on DVD by Cecchi Gori Group. His film Broken (2017) received the Celluloide d'oro award at the Salerno Film Festival, as well as other awards from critics and audiences.

== Screenwriting ==
Budina has written the screenplays for several films, including E huaja, Ulërima, Duke parë rikthimin, Domenica delle palme, Lettere al vento, Ngujimi, Balkan Bazaar, Broken, Një bos lakuriq, Parla Tirana, Muza e ëndrrave të vrara and KapitalKom.

== Political activity ==
During the political changes that led to the end of communist rule in Albania, Budina participated in meetings involving intellectuals, students and the country's political leadership. In August 1990, he was among a group of prominent Albanian intellectuals who met with Ramiz Alia, then President of Albania. In December 1990, he represented professors and students of the University of Tirana in discussions calling for political pluralism. He subsequently became one of the founding members of the Democratic Party of Albania. In June 1992, Budina moved to Italy with his family after being repatriated by the Italian state.

== Teaching and cultural activities ==
Following his move to Italy, Budina became involved with the film school Ipotesi Cinema, founded by Italian filmmaker Ermanno Olmi. He also worked as an assistant director to Toni De Gregorio on several documentaries. Budina has given masterclasses and lectures at universities and educational institutions including the University of Oxford, Brown University, Richmond University, Sapienza University of Rome, Ca' Foscari University of Venice, the University of Padua and the University of Verona. His work has also been the subject of university theses in Italy.

== Writing ==
Budina has written plays, screenplays, essays, novels and articles on theatre, cinema and social and political issues. He has published numerous articles since the 1970s. His books include: • Doruntina, a theatrical adaptation published in Italian in 1991; • Kokëmushkat, a novel published in 2021; • Profeti i kokoshkave, a satirical monodrama published in 2022; • Nata e zjarrit të bardhë, a novel published in 2023. The Italian version of Profeti i kokoshkave was published in the journal Dialoghi Mediterranei in 2023.

== Selected filmography ==
=== As director ===
• Guardando al ritorno (1995) • Domenica delle palme (2002) • Lettere al vento (2003) • Balkan Bazaar (2011) • Broken (2017)

=== As actor ===
• Fije që priten (1976) • Vajzat me kordele të kuqe (1977) • Dollia e dasmës sime (1978) • Ballë për ballë (1979) • Nusja (1980) • Vendimi (1984) • Muri i gjallë (1989) • Shpresa (1990) • Luleborë (2005) • Tickets (2005) by Ken Loach • Eccezzziunale veramente 2 (2005) by Carlo and Enrico Vanzina • Balkan Bazaar (2011) by Edmond Budina • Fuori mira (2014) by Eric Bernasconi • L'Oriana (2015) by Marco Turco • Contromano (2015) by Andamion Murataj • Sorelle per scelta (2019) by Manuela Metri • Parlate a bassa voce (2023) by Esmeralda Calabria • Come crimini e misfatti (2024) by Alessio Pascucci • L'eterna luce del giorno (2026) by Lorenzo Giovenga • “Raffaella 2000” (2026) by Andree Lucini
