= Gazmend Leka =

Albanian painter

- Born: Gazmend Leka; 11 October 1953 (age 73); Tirana, People's Socialist Republic of Albania
- Known for: Painting

Gazmend Leka is an Albanian painter and artistic director and scholar.

== Biography ==
He finished his high school studies at the artistic "Jordan Misja" school in Tirana. He finished studies for painting and graphics at the ILA (today's Academy of Arts).

He was responsible for designing the interior of the "Gjergj Kastrioti-Skanderbeu" museum in Kruja. From 1982, for ten years he worked in the film studio "New Albania" ("Shqipëria e Re") as a painter and artistic director. He worked on two films and won an international award "Dea Fortunata" in Naples.

Since 1992 he has been Professor at the Academy of Arts, Tirana. As a painter he has made around 140 major painting exhibitions inside and outside Albania.

His artwork is typically in earthy tones such as brown or grey.

== Prizes ==
- 1982 - Order of "Naim Frashëri", Third class, Tirana, Albania
- 1983 - First prize at "The Fifth Festival of Animated Movies", Albania
- 1983 - Prize of "Dea Fortunata" At International Festival of Animated Movies, Naples, Italy
- 1984 - Prize of Republic, third class, Tirana, Albania
- 1985 - First prize at "The Sixth Festival of Animated Movies", Albania
- 1986 - Prize of "Odhise Paskali" for the best performance of the year, Tirana, Albania
- 1987 - First National Price for Graphic
- 1988 - Order "Naim Frasheri", first class, Tirana, Albania
- 1994 - Second prize "Onufri", National competition "G.K.A", Tirana, Albania
- 1995 - Second prize "Onufri", National competition "G.K.A", Tirana, Albania
- 1999 - Second prize for animated movie (Panorama e Filmit), Tirana, Albania
- 2000 - Prize of the Year "Painter of the Year", Magazine Kult 2005, Tirana, Albania
