= Spiro Xega =

Albanian painter

- Known for: Painting
- Notable work: Çeta e Shahin Matrakut (Warrior Band of Shahin Matraku), 1930; Skënderbeu (Scanderbeg), 1931
- Style: Romantic Realism
- Movement: Albanian Revival

Spiro Xega (15 June 1861 – 1953) was an Albanian painter. He is associated with the Albanian National Awakening and its ideals. He worked for the movement during the Albanian Declaration of Independence and continued after that event. He was always proud to be Albanian and so was inspired for a long time in his extensive patriotic and artistic activity. During all his life he fought for the independence of Albania.

== Birthplace and his artistic inspiration ==
Spiro was born in Lavdar (center of commune of Opar) on 15 June 1861. During the time of David Selenica, 17th century – 18th century, Korça was well known for its rich heritage of art from Byzantine culture. The area where he grew up was a major source of inspiration for him. Despite not being formally educated in artistic studies, through practice and observation, he was able to create very expressive and original figures. The beautiful nature of his native land and the brave and hardworking people had a lasting impression in the memory of this young man and became later primary models in his beautiful patriotic tableaus, portraits and other masterly reproductions from nature and photos.

When he was 14 years old he was joined by his father, and left with many other compatriots to Istanbul. He went three times to Istanbul but there he did not acquire any property and never forgot his native country, that beautiful and gorgeous nature where the warriors of freedom used to repose.

== Painter’s technique ==
His early work included restoration projects at the Blue Mosque and other churches in Istanbul. During this period, he was exposed to contemporary approaches to painting and conservation practice. He also visited art galleries in Istanbul, Vienna, Belgrade, and Athens, which influenced his artistic development. He worked with oil painting techniques and produced works on a variety of materials, including plywood, metal, silk, and leather. His practice also included mural painting, as well as the creation of wooden ship models and tapestries. His artistic approach drew on multiple sources, including observational study, photography, iconography, and nature. Although he did not undertake formal training in iconography, 15 icons attributed to him are held in the Art Museum in Korçë.

== The portrait in the painter’s work ==
Portraits and especially those taken in original are the first creations of his life. These take an important place in the rich creativity of the paint not only for their spitting image but also their expression. He painted coeval, relatives and personalities from well known traditional families in Korça. To mention are: Parashqevia, Aount Qyrana, his self-portrait exposed in Gallery of Arts in Tirana and of his family and the portrait of a priest of Marianit. In other countries there are also portraits of Woman in Istanbul, Patriarch of Istanbul, Valiu of Monastery and also that one of Sovran Ahmet Zog, the King (2.4 m x 1.7 m).

== Composition ==
A preferred genre of the painter is composition. By observation of some famous work of romanticism and European expressionism of 1920–1925 he made some erotic and lyric paintings such as “Dancing of the nymphs”, “Children and the angel”, “The handsome boy and nymphs” and “Love Arrow”.

== Friend of warriors for freedom ==
After his return to Albania he became friend of patriots who started to work for the liberation of the country. He was friend of Kajo Babien, and also of Mihal Grameno, member of the warriors group of Themistokli Germenji and member of the government after the Declaration of Korca as independent Region. He was a member of the group of delegates participating in the independence of the country from Ottoman Empire and the creation of the government of Ismail Qemali. He supports the democratic revolution led by Fan. S. Noli contributing with votes of people in the area of Opar.

== Paintings ==
=== Tableau of band of Shahin Matraku ===
One of the most conspicuous works is the “Warriors of Shahin Matraku”. This painting is part of the treasure of the National Gallery of Arts in Tirana and it may be considered as a masterpiece of the author. It is unique and of great value characterized by a romantic theme and a patriotic inspiration. This is considered as the Pearl of Albanian art and the most prominent painting till the middle of the 20th century.

=== Tableau of war of Mesolongj ===
At the center of this tableau are the brave warriors Marko Boçari, Foto Xhavella and many others Albanians fraternized with Greeks fighting against ottomans in the Greek revolution of 1821. This paint shows the energy of the movements and details of the traditional wear of that period.

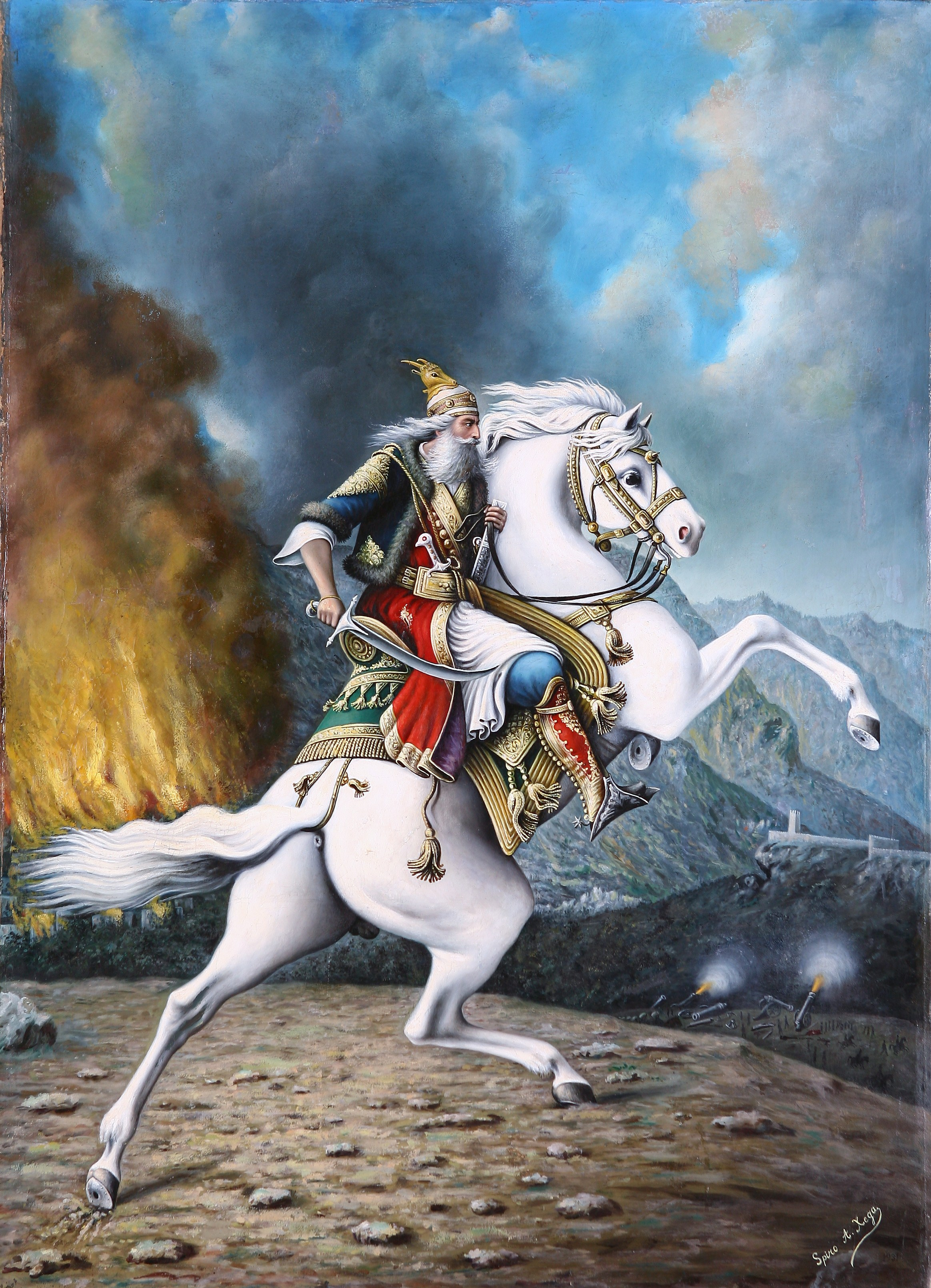
Skanderbeg by Spiro Xega

=== Figure of Skanderbeg ===
Xega is noted for his focus on patriotic themes during the early 20th century. He produced 15 works depicting the Albanian national hero, Skanderbeg. These compositions are characterized by the dynamic movement of both the figure and his horse, utilizing fluid lines in the rendering of the sword, kilt, and hair to convey action.

A significant element of Xega's work is the symbolic integration of regional Albanian attire. By combining the short woolen jacket typical of Northern Albania with the kilt associated with the South, the artist intended to represent national unification. Due to its historical and symbolic relevance, this imagery is frequently utilized in Albanian history textbooks.

Also another symbolic painting is the portrait of Donika Kastrioti the wife of the hero, as a perfect Albanian woman dressed with a national costume.

== First drawing course in Albania ==
Taking part in different patriotic unions he opened the first course of drawing in Korça. His first students were those who later became a very successful generation of painters as Guri Madhi, Vangjush Tushi etc... Generally they used to work in graphics using carbon pencils and taking different models.

== Paint and photography ==
There are known connections between the paintings of Spiro and the photographers Kristo Sulidhi in Korça and Kel Marubi in Shkodër. They had a reciprocal collaboration. Spiro took inspiration from Kristo Sulidhi for different positions of warriors and from Marubi he took portraits and the typical dresses of the north such as woolen jackets, jerkins, pistols in belts etc. This can be seen in the figure of Skanderbeg from the year 1936.

== Creativity of Spiro Xega as a national treasure ==
Counting about 137 paintings such as portraits, compositions, tableau, naturalism, created a real artistic ensemble which for a long time and now continues to affect the development of figurative arts and patriotic and artistic education of Albanian people. He used to display his paintings in his private shop. Before the liberation of the country in 1944 he participated at three different exhibitions where he was very appreciated. In the year 1956 an exhibition of all of his works opened in Tirana and his works were highly appraised.

His home had always been a home gallery and was visited by Albanians and foreigners (we can mention here the Russian producer Ilia Kopain and the artist Akaki Khorava, of the famous movie of Skënderbeu, who depicted the figure of Skanderbeg based on the creativity of the painter Spiro Xega).

== The artistic and genetic inheritance of the painter ==
Spiro Xega produced approximately 137 works across several media, including graphics, oils, murals, and icons. His paintings are held in Albanian museums and private collections both in Albania and abroad, including the United States.

The painting skills of Spiro still run in the blood of the Xega family. His nephew, Ilia Xega has participated in many regional exhibitions and his grand nephew, Dhimitri Xega has also inherited the art of painting and is enriching even more than the artistic treasure of the paintings in Xega family.
