= National Centre of Cultural Property Inventory (Albania) =

- Qendra Kombëtare e Inventarizimit të Pasurive Kulturore
- Official logo

Archives agency overview
- Formed: March 27, 1995
- Jurisdiction: Albania
- Headquarters: Tirana
- Archives agency executive: Silva Breshani, Director
- Parent department: Ministry of Culture
- Website: Official website

The National Centre of Cultural Property Inventory (NCCPI) (Albanian: Qendra Kombëtare e Inventarizimit të Pasurive Kulturore or QKIPK) is the national registry of cultural property in Albania.

== Background ==
The centre was founded by Dashnor Kokonozi, also its first director, in the early 1990s after the breakdown of law and order in Albania following the ousting of the Communist regime led to looting of cultural heritage objects. Requests to Interpol for help tracing looted objects revealed a lack of records in Albania and Kokonozi persuaded the World Bank to fund the creation of the first national inventory.

== Scope ==
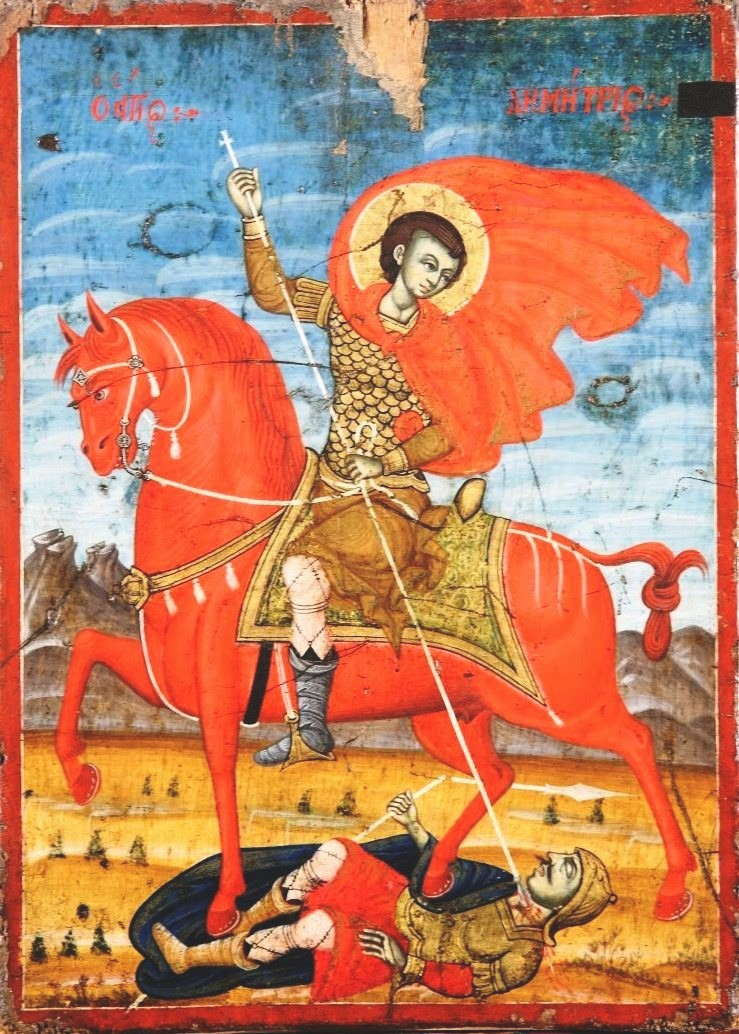
An icon attributed to Kostandin Shpataraku, bought by Hetem Ramadani in 2010 from a private collection, that had not previously been entered on the NCCPI.

The centre aims to register all of Albania's cultural assets held by museums, galleries, art institutes, religious communities and private collectors by creating an illustrated "passport" for each item recording the item type, name, author, owner, where it was found, the current location and the period or movement to which it belongs.

== Coverage ==
Although the registration of objects held by institutions is almost complete, the registration of objects in private ownership has hardly begun due to a lack of public awareness of the scheme, the lack of awareness by the public of the value of items held privately, and the wish of some individuals to keep their ownership of heritage items private so that they can be traded confidentially on the illegal art market. The register is divided into two parts, those where the location is known, and those which are lost.

== Staff ==
The first director of the NCCPI was Dashnor Kokonozi. The director in 2010 was Izet Duraku.
