= Banište =

Banište Баниште Banisht
- Village
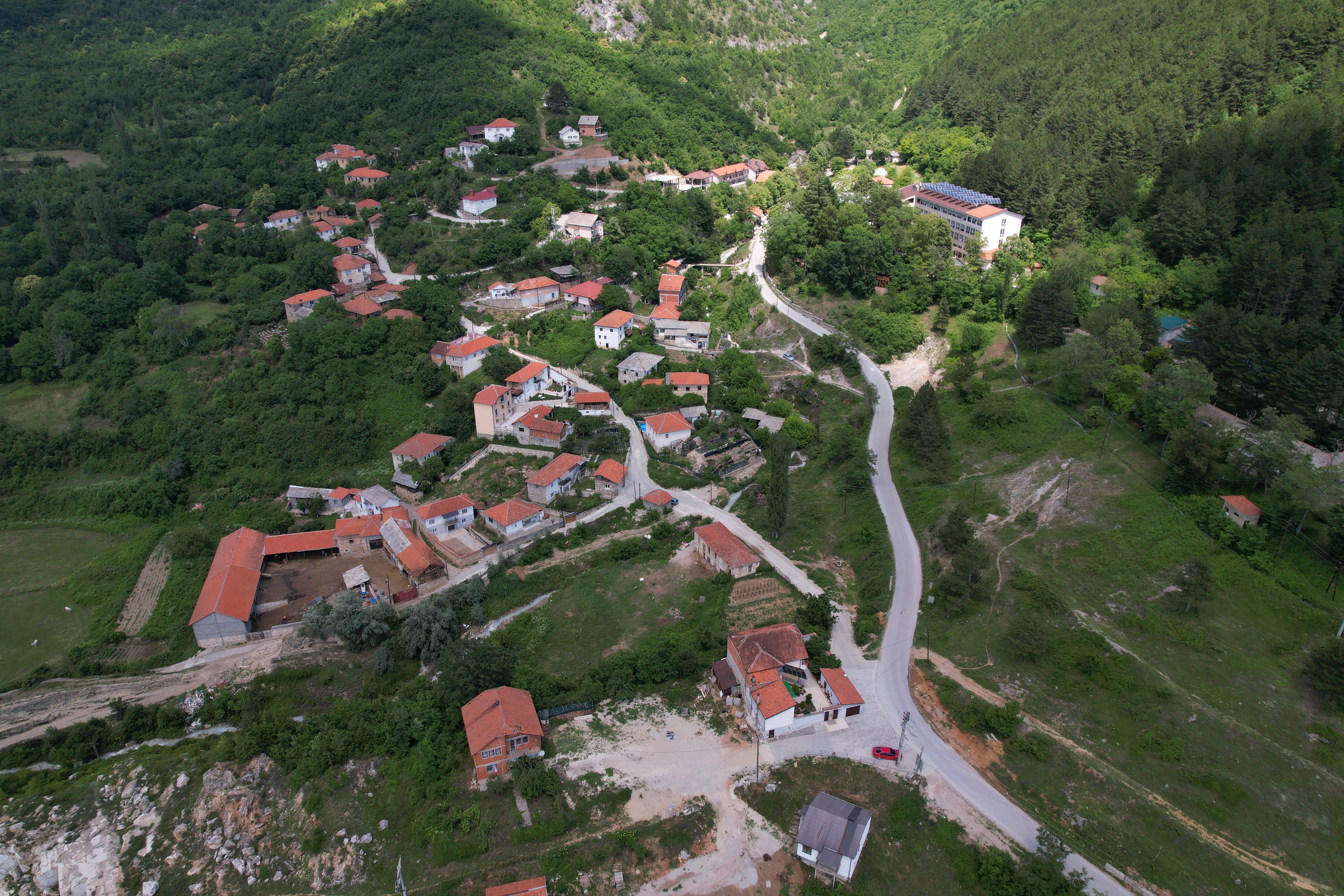
- View of the village

- Location within North Macedonia
- Coordinates: 41°34′N 20°32′E
- Country: North Macedonia
- Region: Southwestern
- Municipality: Debar

Population (2021)
  - Total: 35
- Time zone: UTC+1 (CET)
  - Summer (DST): UTC+2 (CEST)
- Car plates: DB

Banište (Macedonian: Баниште, Albanian: Banisht) is a village in the municipality of Debar, North Macedonia. It is located close to the Albanian border.

== Demographics ==
Banište (Banishta) is recorded in the Ottoman defter of 1467 as a village in the vilayet of Upper Dibra. The settlement had a total of 10 households with the anthroponymy attested being of a mixed Albanian-Slavic character with instances of Slavicisation (e.g., Gjon Popovići): the brothers Gjorgo, Istanec, and Nikolla Papriçi; Kojo, son of Gjergj; Gjorgo, son of Istepan; Gjon Popovići; Dimitri, brother of the aforementioned; Progon, brother of the aforementioned; Ninec, brother of Kojo; and Istanec, brother of Gjorgo.

As of the 2021 census, Banište had 35 residents with the following ethnic composition:

- Albanians 28
- Persons for whom data are taken from administrative sources 4
- Macedonians 3

According to the 2002 census, the village had a total of 90 inhabitants. Ethnic groups in the village include:

- Albanians 80
- Macedonians 10
