= Fatos Tarifa =

Fatos Tarifa (born 21 August 1954) is a social scientist and a former diplomat from Albania.

== Education ==
Tarifa has a double doctorate, with a Ph.D. in Sociology from the University of North Carolina at Chapel Hill and a doctorate in Political Science from the University of Tirana. He has been, inter alia, a lecturer, a researcher and a distinguished visiting fellow since 1981, when he joined the School of Political Science and Law at the University of Tirana. In 1992 he was awarded a Fulbright Fellowship at the Department of Sociology at UNC Chapel Hill, North Carolina.

== Career ==
Tarifa served as Albanian ambassador to the Netherlands (1998–2001) and to the United States (2001–2005). Currently he is Professor of Sociology and International Relations, and Director of the Institute for Studies on Democracy and Development at the University of New York Tirana. Tarifa has taught and conducted research at the University of Tirana, the European University of Tirana, the Institute of Social Studies at The Hague, Webster University (Leiden, the Netherlands), Campbell University, the University of North Carolina at Chapel Hill, and Eastern Michigan University and he has delivered lectures at institutions of higher education throughout the world, such as Duke University, Stanford University, New York University, Harvard University, Brown University, the University of California at Berkeley, Tufts University, the University of Essex, and the University of Amsterdam.

Tarifa has authored, co-authored and edited 45 books and more than 90 journal articles. His books and articles have covered topics ranging from democratic transition and social issues in Eastern Europe to Human development, and current international affairs. In 1998 he became the founding Editor of "Sociological Analysis", an innovative, international scholarly journal published at Chapel Hill, NC, which he edited for 15 years. He serves as a member of the International Advisory Board of the "Journal of Social Sciences" and the "Journal of Applied Social Science".

Dr. Tarifa will probably be best remembered as the leader of a campaign to introduce the discipline of sociology into higher education in Albania. He is widely considered to be "the founder of sociological studies in Albania, and one of the country's most prominent social scientists". Tarifa has "already earned the title of father of Albanian sociology, a moniker he has generally resisted".

== Main publications ==
- The First Decade and After (2000) – ISBN 90-6490-044-2
- The Breakdown of State Socialism and the Emerging Post-Socialist Order (2001) – ISBN 90-6490-045-0
- Culture, Ideology, and Society (2001) – ISBN 90-806178-2-2
- The Quest for Legitimacy and the Withering Away of Utopia (2001) – ISBN 90-806178-3-0
- The Balkans: A Mission neither Accomplished nor Impossible (2002) – ISBN 90-806178-1-4
- To Albania, with Love (2007) – ISBN 0-7618-3590-3
- Europe Adrift on the Wine-Dark Sea (2007) – ISBN 978-0-9776662-8-7
- Jeta shoqerore si eksperience sociologjike [Social Life as Sociological Experience] (2007) – ISBN 978-99943-44-20-8
- Saga e dy kontinenteve [The Tale of Two Continents] (2007) – ISBN 978-99943-44-38-3
- Vengeance is Mine: Justice Albanian Style (2008) – ISBN 978-0-9801896-0-5
- Amerikanofobia dhe anti-amerikanizmi europian [Americanophobia and Anti-Americanism in Europe] (2008) – ISBN 978-99943-44-87-1
- Europa e pabashkuar [Ununited Europe] (2009) – ISBN 978-99956-38-02-3
- Paradigma e tranzicionit demokratik [The Paradigm of Democratic Transition] (2009) – ISBN 978-99956-38-24-5
- Kaloresit e humbur te kryqezates anti-Kadare [The Defeated Warriors of the anti-Kadare Crusade] (2010) – ISBN 978-99956-38-41-2
- Rilindja e Europes [Europe's Renaissance] (2010) – ISBN 978-99956-38-47-4
- Fati i nje shekulli [The Fate of a Century] (2010) – ISBN 978-99956-38-51-1
- Letters to America / Letra Amerikes (2011) – ISBN 978-99956-38-94-8
- Dinamika e modernitetit pluralizues [The Dynamics of Pluralizing Modernity] (2012) - ISBN 9789928060365
- Politika dhe historia [Politics and History] (2012) - ISBN 978-99956-39-50-1
- Dija, universiteti dhe demokracia [Knowledge, the University, and Democracy] (2012) - ISBN 978-99280-60-47-1
- Pamundesia e projektit europian [The Impossibility of the European Project] (2013) - ISBN 978-99281-65-23-7
- Shkencat e shoqërisë: Sociologjia si disiplinë integruese për studimin e jetës shoqërore [The Sciences of Society: Sociology as an Integrative Discipline for the Study of Social Life] with a Foreword by Anthony Giddens (2013) - ISBN 978-99281-64-44-5
- Përplasje qytetërimesh? Radikalizmi islamik në kontekst historik dhe politik [Clash of Civilizations? Radical Islam in Historical and Political Contexts] (2013) - ISBN 978-99281-64-75-9
- Arsim i lartë për një shoqëri të hapur [Higher Education for an Open Society] (2013) - ISBN 978-99956-39-51-8
- Politika si gramatikë dhe metaforë [Politics as Grammar and Metaphor] (2014) - ISBN 978-99281-64-85-8
- Imagjinata sociologjike dhe bota jonë sociale [The Sociological Imagination and Our Social World] (2014) - ISBN 978-99281-64-92-6
- Një botë e mbarsur për shekullin e 21-të [A World Loaded for the 21st Century] (2014) - ISBN 978-99281-64-96-4
- Bona fide (2014) - ISBN 978-99281-86-14-0
- Hakmarrja është imja: Morfologjia sociale dhe gramatika morale e gjakmarrjes [Vengeance is Mine: The Social Morphology and Moral Grammar of Vengeance] (2014)

== Sources ==
- Peter, Lucas (2007), "Foreword", To Albania, with Love by Fatos Tarifa, Hamilton Books, ISBN 978-0-7618-3590-5.
- Jay Weinstein; Bavjola Shatro; Klementin Mile (2011), Sociologjia shqiptare dhe profili i studiuesit Fatos Tarifa, Ombra GVG, ISBN 978-99280-60-11-2
- Barbara, Heyns (2003), "Introduction", Social Problems of Transition by Fatos Tarifa, Smiet, ISBN 90-806178-5-7.
