= Haki Stërmilli =

Albanian writer (1895–1953)

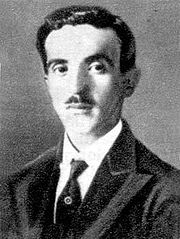
- Stërmilli in the 1930s
- Born: 17 May 1895; Debar, Ottoman Empire (modern North Macedonia)
- Died: 17 January 1953 (aged 57); Tirana, Albania
- Writing career
- Notable works: Dibranja e mjerueshme, 1923; Dashuni e Besnikëri, 1923; Burgu, 1935; Sikur t'isha djalë, 1938; Trashëgimtarët tanë, 1950; Shtigjeve të lirisë, 1966; Kalorësi i Skënderbeut, 1968

Haki Stërmilli (17 May 1895 – 17 January 1953) was an Albanian writer and journalist. His works dealt mostly with issues related to the rights of Albanian communities outside Albania, republicanism, the emancipation of women and feminism. His best-known work is the novel If I Were a Boy (Albanian: Sikur të isha djalë).

== Life ==
Born in Debar, Ottoman Empire (modern North Macedonia), Stërmilli finished his first studies in Bitola. In 1920 along with Avni Rustemi he became one of the founders and the secretary of the youth organization Bashkimi. An anti-monarchist and supporter of Fan Noli he took part in the revolt that overthrew the monarchy, but after its restoration in late 1924 he was exiled. In 1930 he was captured by the Yugoslav authorities and deported to Albania, where he was sentenced to prison for his anti-monarchist activities. During World War II he joined the National Liberation Movement (LNÇ) and became head of the organization in the Dibër District. After the war he was elected a deputy of the Albanian parliament and also served as head of the National Library of Albania until his death in 1953.

== Works ==
Stërmilli's first works include the novel The Unfortunate Dibrane (Albanian: Dibranja e mjerueshme) and Love and Loyalty (Albanian: Dashuni e Besnikëri), which describe the persecution of the Albanian community of his home region Debar by the Serbian army. In 1935 his semi-autobiographical work The Prison (Albanian: Burgu), a memoir of life in prison and its degraded conditions and effects, was published. The novel Sikur t'isha djalë (English: If I were a Boy), published in 1936, is his best-known work and the first literary work in Albanian that dealt with the subjects of feminism and the emancipation of women. "Sikur t'isha djalë" became one of the most popular books of the 1930s in Albanian and is considered revolutionary for that period.

== See also ==
- Albanian literature
