= If I Were a Boy (novel) =

1936 novel by Haki Stërmilli

- The 2002 edition cover, published by Letrat
- Author: Haki Stërmilli
- Original title: Sikur t'isha djalë
- Language: Albanian
- Genre: Fiction, Drama
- Publication date: 1936
- Publication place: Albania
- Pages: 155

If I Were a Boy (Albanian: Sikur t'isha djalë) is an Albanian epistolary novel written by Haki Stërmilli in 1936. Written mostly in the form of diary entries, it documents the struggles of the young female protagonist, Dija, as she tries to adjust to an Albanian patriarchal society, which was common at the time. The novel was originally written in Gheg Albanian.

== Plot ==
The novel starts with Dija's cousin, Hamit, who is on a bus with a small box on his hands. The box was entrusted to him by Dija, who now had contracted tuberculosis. After opening it he finds a white scarf, a notepad and a letter addressed to a Mr. Shpend Rrëfe, Tirana. Hamit opens the notepad and in the first page he reads a title, written in red, saying "My Life". After a while he reaches his destination and rents a room in a hotel in which he starts reading what seemed to be a diary of his cousin Dija.

With this diary starts the epistolary form of the novel which Dija describes in first person the hardships, horrors, tortures, struggles in her life and having no say in virtually anything that concerns her from being forcefully married to an aged wealthy trader to even physical abuse from her step-mother. In the diary Dija describes her love and affection for Shpend Rrëfe, a boy of her age, whom she describes as being the only cause she didn't commit suicide. In the early hours of the morning Hamit finishes reading the diary, being interrupted by his tears and emotional distress many times throughout that night he finally manages to fall asleep, during which he dreams of Dija. He wakes up late after which a hotel servant enters and hands him a telegram from Dija's father which reads "Come quickly, Dija wants to see you". He leaves the job for what he came there for and grabs a transport for Tirana, but he is too late because Dija had already succumbed to tuberculosis and was buried, her last wish being Hamit delivers the letter to Shpend. Hamit goes to her grave, weeps and promises her he will fulfill her last wish. He then goes to Shpend and they both agree to publish a book based on Dija's diary which would serve as a way to raise awareness of the condition Albanian women were in.

== Excerpt ==
I cannot write anymore for a wave of blood is ready to burst from my mouth and I can feel a strong pain in my chest. It looks like this is the last push the disease does. I'm leaving you my faithful diary, forever this time. Farewell for I'm leaving you and my life. Sikur T'isha Djalë, Last writings of Dija

== Setting ==
The book is set in various locations across Albania, primarily in the capital, Tirana, during the 1930s. The story primarily takes place in a traditional Albanian society, where women's roles are confined to marriage and domestic duties, while education and independence are largely reserved for men.

== See also ==
- Albanian literature
- Feminism
