= Dashnor Kokonozi =

Albanian journalist and writer (born 1951)

Dashnor Kononozi (born 21 June 1951) is an Albanian journalist and writer who founded the National Centre of Cultural Property Inventory (NCCPI) and was also its first director.

== Cultural heritage ==
Kokonozi founded the NCCPI in the early 1990s after the breakdown of law and order in Albania following the ousting of the Communist regime led to looting of cultural heritage objects. Requests to Interpol for help tracing looted objects revealed a lack of records in Albania and Kokonozi persuaded the World Bank to fund the creation of the first national inventory.
