= List of heads of state of Albania =

This is a list of heads of state of Albania who have served since the Declaration of Independence of 1912.

Since the collapse of the communist regime in 1991, the head of state of Albania is the president of the republic. (Note: Albanian: Presidenti i Republikës) The president is indirectly elected to a five-year term and is limited to a maximum of two terms, as specified by the Constitution. As in most parliamentary systems, the president is now by-and-large a ceremonial office, with the prime minister de facto heading the executive branch.

== Heads of state ==
=== Independent Albania (1912–1914) ===
| No. | Portrait | Name | Term of office | | | Title | Affiliation |
|---|---|---|---|---|---|---|---|
| 1 | | Ismail Qemali (1844–1919) | 28 November 1912 | 22 January 1914 | 1 year, 55 days | Chairman of the Provisional Government | Independent |
| 2 | | Fejzi Alizoti (1874–1945) | 22 January 1914 | 7 March 1914 | 44 days | Chairman of the Central Administration | Independent |

=== Republic of Central Albania (1913–1914) ===
| No. | Portrait | Name | Term of office | | | Title | Affiliation |
|---|---|---|---|---|---|---|---|
| — | | Essad Toptani (1863–1920) | 12 October 1913 | 12 February 1914 | 123 days | Chairman of the Opposition Council of the Elders of Central Albania | Independent |

=== Principality of Albania (1914–1925) ===
| No. | Portrait | Name | Term of office | | | Title | Affiliation |
|---|---|---|---|---|---|---|---|
| 3 | | Wilhelm I (1876–1945) | 7 March 1914 | 3 September 1914 | 180 days | Prince of Albania | House of Wied-Neuwied |
| — | | Mustafa Ndroqi (????–????) | 23 September 1914 | 4 October 1914 | 11 days | Chairman of the First General Council | Independent |
| 4 | | Essad Toptani (1863–1920) | 5 October 1914 | 24 February 1916 | 1 year, 142 days | Chairman of the Provisional Government | Independent |
Austro-Hungarian Command (23 January 1916 – 30 October 1918)
| 5 | | Turhan Përmeti (1846–1927) | 28 December 1918 | 28 January 1920 | 1 year, 31 days | Chairman of the Provisional Government | Independent |
| — | | Sulejman Delvina (1884–1933) | 28 January 1920 | 30 January 1920 | 2 days | Chairman of the Provisional Government | Independent |
High Council of Regency (30 January 1920 – 31 January 1925)
| 6 | | Fan Noli (1882–1965) | 2 July 1924 | 24 December 1924 | 175 days | Head of state in place of the High Council | People's Party |

=== Albanian Republic (1925–1928) ===
| No. | Portrait | Name | Term of office | | | Title | Election | Affiliation |
|---|---|---|---|---|---|---|---|---|
| 7 | | Ahmet Zogu (1895–1961) | 31 January 1925 | 1 September 1928 | 3 years, 213 days | President of Albania | 1925 | Conservative Party |

=== Albanian Kingdom (1928–1939) ===
| No. | Portrait | Name | Reign | | | Title | Affiliation |
|---|---|---|---|---|---|---|---|
| (7) | | Zog I (1895–1961) | 1 September 1928 | 9 April 1939 | 10 years, 220 days | King of the Albanians | House of Zogu |

=== Italian Albania (1939–1943) ===
| No. | Portrait | Name | Term of office | | | Title | Affiliation |
|---|---|---|---|---|---|---|---|
| ― | | Xhafer Ypi (1880–1940) | 9 April 1939 | 12 April 1939 | 3 days | Chairman of the Provisional Administration Committee | Fascist Party |
| ― | | Shefqet Vërlaci (1877–1946) | 12 April 1939 | 16 April 1939 | 4 days | Chairman of the Provisional Administration Committee | Fascist Party |
| 9 | | Victor Emmanuel III (1869–1947) | 16 April 1939 | 8 September 1943 | 4 years, 145 days | King of the Albanians | House of Savoy |

=== German occupation of Albania (1943–1944) ===
| No. | Portrait | Name | Term of office | | | Title | Affiliation |
|---|---|---|---|---|---|---|---|
| 10 | | Ibrahim Biçaku (1905–1977) | 14 September 1943 | 20 October 1943 | 36 days | Chairman of the Provisional Executive Committee | Balli Kombëtar |
| 11 | | Mehdi Frashëri (1872–1963) | 20 October 1943 | 25 October 1944 | 1 year, 5 days | Chairman of the Provisional Administration Committee | Balli Kombëtar |

=== People's Socialist Republic of Albania (1944–1991) ===
| No. | Portrait | Name | Term of office | | | Title | Affiliation |
|---|---|---|---|---|---|---|---|
| 12 | | Omer Nishani (1887–1954) | 26 May 1944 | 1 August 1953 | 9 years, 67 days | Chairman of the Presidium of the People's Assembly of Albania | Communist Party renamed in 1948 to Party of Labour |
| 13 | | Haxhi Lleshi (1913–1998) | 1 August 1953 | 22 November 1982 | 29 years, 113 days | Chairman of the Presidium of the People's Assembly of Albania | Party of Labour |
| 14 | | Ramiz Alia (1925–2011) | 22 November 1982 | 29 April 1991 | 8 years, 158 days | Chairman of the Presidium of the People's Assembly of Albania | Party of Labour |

=== Republic of Albania (1991–present) ===
| No. | Portrait | Name | Term of office | | | Title | Election | Affiliation |
|---|---|---|---|---|---|---|---|---|
| (14) | | Ramiz Alia (1925–2011) | 30 April 1991 | 3 April 1992 | 339 days | President of Albania | 1991 | Party of Labour |
| ― | | Kastriot Islami (born 1952) | 3 April 1992 | 6 April 1992 | 3 days | Speaker of the Parliament | ― | Socialist Party |
| ― | | Pjetër Arbnori (1935–2006) | 6 April 1992 | 9 April 1992 | 3 days | Speaker of the Parliament | ― | Democratic Party |
| 15 | | Sali Berisha (born 1944) | 9 April 1992 | 24 July 1997 | 5 years, 106 days | President of Albania | 1992 | Democratic Party |
| ― | | Skënder Gjinushi (born 1949) | 24 July 1997 | | 0 days | Speaker of the Parliament | ― | Social Democratic Party |
| 16 | | Rexhep Meidani (born 1944) | 24 July 1997 | 24 July 2002 | 5 years | President of Albania | 1997 | Socialist Party |
| 9 | | Alfred Moisiu (born 1929) | 24 July 2002 | 24 July 2007 | 5 years | President of Albania | 2002 | Independent |
| 17 | | Bamir Topi (born 1957) | 24 July 2007 | 24 July 2012 | 5 years | President of Albania | 2007 | Democratic Party |
| 18 | | Bujar Nishani (1966–2022) | 24 July 2012 | 24 July 2017 | 5 years | President of Albania | 2012 | Democratic Party |
| 19 | | Ilir Meta (born 1969) | 24 July 2017 | 24 July 2022 | 5 years | President of Albania | 2017 | Socialist Movement for Integration |
| 20 | | Bajram Begaj (born 1967) | 24 July 2022 | Incumbent | 4 years, 66 days | President of Albania | 2022 | Independent |

== Timeline ==
This is a graphical lifespan timeline of the heads of state of Albania. They are listed in order of first assuming office.

The following chart lists heads of state by lifespan (living heads of state on the green line), with the years outside of their tenure in beige. Heads of state with an unknown birth date or death date are shown with only their tenure or their earlier or later life.

The following chart shows heads of state by their age (living heads of state in green), with the years of their tenure in blue. Heads of state with an unknown birth or death date are excluded. The vertical black line at 40 years indicates the minimum age to be president as of now.

== See also ==
- List of Albanian monarchs
- King of Albania
- President of Albania
- List of de facto leaders of Communist Albania
