= Omer Nishani =

Albanian politician (1887–1954)

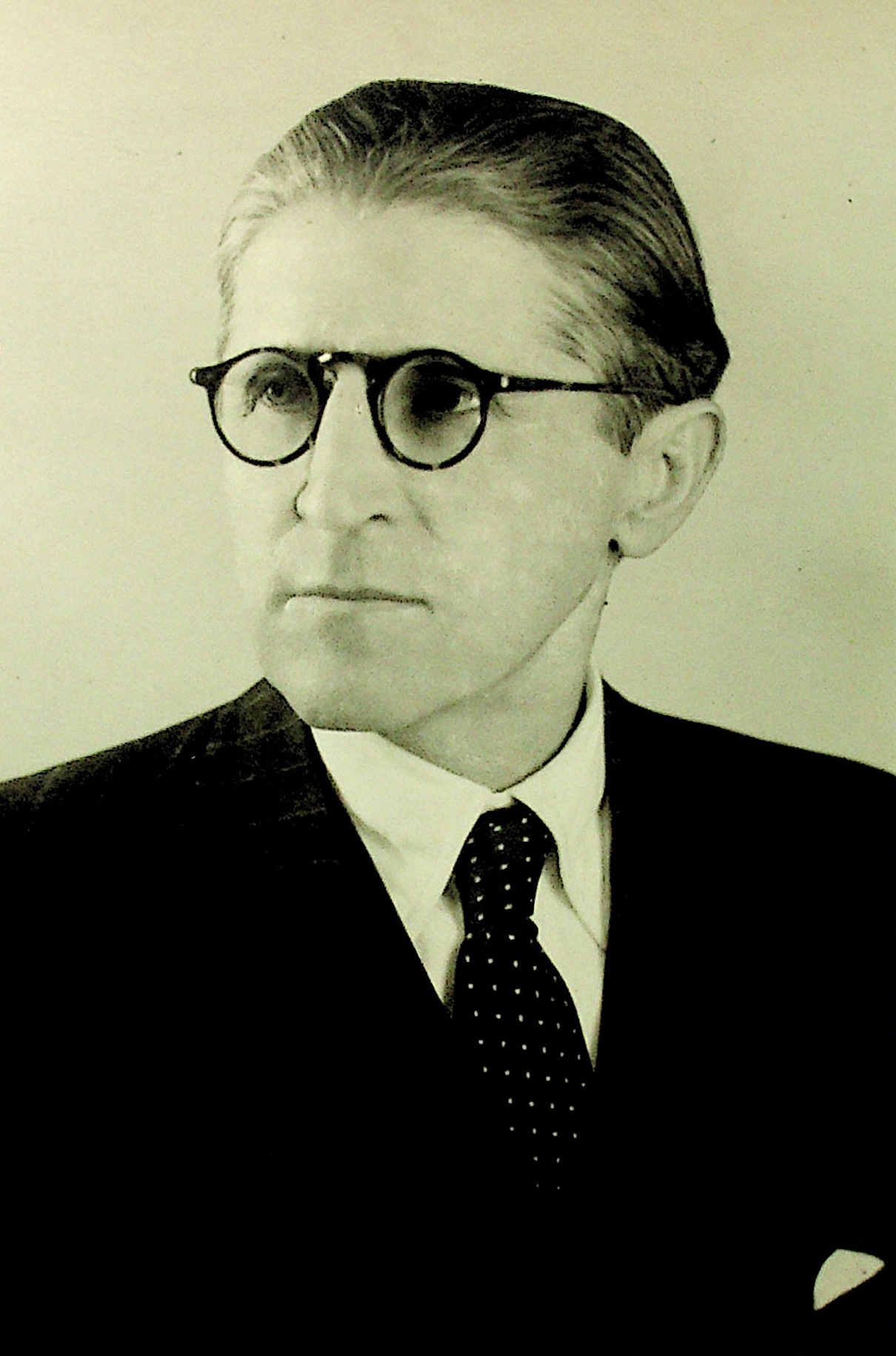

Minister of Foreign Affairs of the Socialist People’s Republic of Albania
- In office 22 October 1944 – 22 March 1946
- Prime Minister: Enver Hoxha
- Preceded by: New position
- Succeeded by: Enver Hoxha

Chairman of the Presidium of the People's Assembly of Albania
- In office 16 March 1946 – 1 August 1953
- Preceded by: New position
- Succeeded by: Haxhi Lleshi

Personal details
- Born: 5 February 1887 Gjirokastër, Janina Vilayet, Ottoman Empire (modern Albania)
- Died: 26 May 1954 (aged 67) Tirana, People's Republic of Albania
- Cause of death: Likely Suicide
- Relations: Besim Nishani (Brother), Bujar Nishani (distant cousin)
- Profession: Physician and politician

Omer Nishani (5 February 1887 – 26 May 1954) was an Albanian medical doctor and political figure involved first in the struggle against Ahmet Zogu (known after 1928 as King Zog) in the 1920s and 1930s, and then in the struggle against the fascist occupation of Albania during the 1942–44 period, becoming Chairman of the Presidium of the People's Assembly of the People's Republic of Albania (thereby becoming the country's head of state) in 1946 and serving in this position until 1953.

== Biography ==
Omer was born in Gjirokastër in the Janina Vilayet of the Ottoman Empire. His brother, Beso, was a teacher whose students included a young Enver Hoxha (also a native of Gjirokastër). Nishani studied medicine in Istanbul, graduating but not practicing it as a profession. He worked as a physician in Vienna and from 1915 to 1918, worked in Ballsh. He moved to Tirana in the Tirana Hospital and then in Durrës until 1924.

In the early 1920s he involved himself in politics. He participated in an assassination attempt on Ahmet Zogu in 1924 and served two weeks in prison. Later, he supported the June Revolution of Fan S. Noli whose forces in 1924 overthrew the conservative order backed by Ahmet Zogu and established a democratic government. Nishani participated in a trial held against Zogu in absentia. After the downfall of the government in December that same year, Nishani fled abroad and co-founded the anti-Zogu and Comintern-backed KONARE (National Revolutionary Committee) in 1925, helping to run its newspaper Liria Kombëtare (National Freedom) together with the Albanian Communist Halim Xhelo from 1925 to 1932 in Geneva. He settled in Vienna and married an Austrian, Rozvita von Woler. While in exile, he was sentenced to death in Albania.

After the Italian invasion of Albania in 1939 Nishani returned to the country and initially joined the collaborationist government's Council of State which comprised various personalities opposed to King Zog. Nishani, who had known Enver Hoxha's father, Halil, was visited by Hoxha (who was then head of the Communist Party of Albania and leader of the partisan resistance) and remarked that, "We old fogies have had our day, long live the youth, because you are the hope of the country. I haven't done anything much, but I fought Zog as much as I could. And I had good comrades on the newspaper who helped me in that direction. I did not give up, but what was I to do, die in exile? I was longing to see the country and my people. I came back, but these fascists and occupiers and all the rogues who serve them like dogs, I hate them like death. But you are going to say, then why did you join the 'Council of State'? I had to, because I have nothing to live on and I have a wife to keep. So this is what I am reduced to." He quickly grew disenchanted with the post-Zog occupation and regarded involvement in the quisling government as a mistake; in this same conversation he said that "everybody knows that fascism cuts the heads of communists. I am not a communist, but I have lived and worked with them, I have respected them and they have respected me. I shall tell you one thing: for you the road is not strewn with flowers, but go on, fight, because only by fighting you will save Albania."

After convincing Nishani to involve himself in what the Communists termed the Anti-Fascist National Liberation War, Hoxha noted that, "Omer Nishani kept his word and worked in Tirana as a zealous activist of the National Liberation Movement. And when the moments required him, the comrades and I talked it over and we thought that he would be valuable in the work of the General Council as a mature, patriotic and cultured man for the work of propaganda, the organization of the state, etc. We sent him word and the doctor left Tirana for the mountains where he stayed until the country was liberated." Nishani became a member of the National Liberation Movement upon its formation in September 1942. In September 1943 Nishani was made Chairman of the Standing Committee of the National Liberation General Council, and at the Congress of Përmet in May 1944 he was made Chairman of the Anti-Fascist National Liberation Council and in charge of foreign affairs. On January 11, 1946 Nishani became Chairman of the Constituent Assembly which on March 16 was transformed into the People's Assembly of the People's Republic of Albania.

Nishani, who was not a member of the ruling Party of Labour of Albania, served as the first Chairman of the Presidium of the People's Assembly.

In 1952, his brother, Besim Nishani, was arrested for “propaganda against the people’s government”. At the same time, his wife reportedly split with him. Some reports cited that this was her desire to separate. A 1953 article in the right-wing Paris-Presse newspaper suggested that his wife (who the paper referred to as Israeli) was forced to leave the presidential palace and live under house arrest under suspicion of having connections with reactionary elements and that Nishani himself was virtually a prisoner.

Officially, Nishani requested to resign on July 24, 1953 for health reasons. He was succeeded by Haxhi Lleshi on August 1.

According to a dossier of the Ministry of Interior of Albania, an autopsy on Nishani's body concluded that he committed suicide, something considered taboo at the time.

In 1988 a compilation of his articles and speeches made during the socialist period was published under the title Për Shqipërinë e popullit.

He was a distant relative of the seventh President of Albania Bujar Nishani.

Political offices
Preceded by New position	Chairman of the Presidium of the People's Assembly of Albania; March 16, 1946–August 1, 1953	Succeeded by Haxhi Lleshi
