= 1965 in Albania =

- Decades: 1940s; 1950s; 1960s; 1970s; 1980s
- See also: Other events of 1965; List of years in Albania

The following lists events that happened during 1965 in the People's Republic of Albania.

== Incumbents ==
- First Secretary: Enver Hoxha
- Chairman of the Presidium of the People's Assembly: Haxhi Lleshi
- Prime Minister: Mehmet Shehu

== Events ==
- 26 May - 1964–66 Balkans Cup: Albania is defeated by Bulgaria 1–0 at Yuri Gagarin Stadium, Varna
- 2 June - 1964–66 Balkans Cup: Albania ties with Turkey 1–1 at BJK İnönü Stadium, Istanbul
- 14 July - 1964–66 Balkans Cup: Albania is defeated by Romania 3–1 at Stadionul Giulești-Valentin Stănescu (1939), Bucharest
- 26 November - 1964–66 Balkans Cup: Albania defeats Turkey 2–0 at Selman Stërmasi Stadium, Tirana
