= 1973 in Albania =

- Decades: 1950s; 1960s; 1970s; 1980s; 1990s
- See also: Other events of 1973; List of years in Albania

The following lists events that happened during 1973 in the People's Republic of Albania.

== Incumbents ==
- First Secretary: Enver Hoxha
- Chairman of the Presidium of the People's Assembly: Haxhi Lleshi
- Prime Minister: Mehmet Shehu

== Events ==
- 7 March – 1973 Balkans Cup: Albania defeats Yugoslavia 1-0 at Elbasan Arena, Elbasan
- 11 April – 1973 Balkans Cup: Albania is defeated by Romania 5-1 at Ladislau Bölöni Stadium (Târgu Mureș), Târgu Mureș
- 25 April – 1973 Balkans Cup: Albania is defeated by Yugoslavia 1-0 at Gradski stadion (Nikšić), Nikšić
- 30 May – 1973 Balkans Cup: Albania defeats Romania 2-0 at Ruzhdi Bizhuta, Elbasan
