= 2020 in Albania =

- Decades: 2000s; 2010s; 2020s
- See also: Other events of 2020; List of years in Albania

Events from the year 2020 in Albania.

== Incumbents ==
- President: Ilir Meta
- Prime Minister: Edi Rama
- Deputy Prime Minister: Erion Braçe

== Events ==
Ongoing – COVID-19 pandemic in Albania

=== March ===
- March 8 – The first two cases of COVID-19 in the country were confirmed, one of whom had traveled to Florence.
- March 10
  - President Ilir Meta calls for retired Albanian doctors to re-enter the work force.
  - It was discovered that a woman from Maryland contracted COVID-19 after visiting Albania and spending time in a Turkish airport.
- March 11 – The first COVID-19 death in the country was reported: an elderly woman in Durrës.

=== May ===
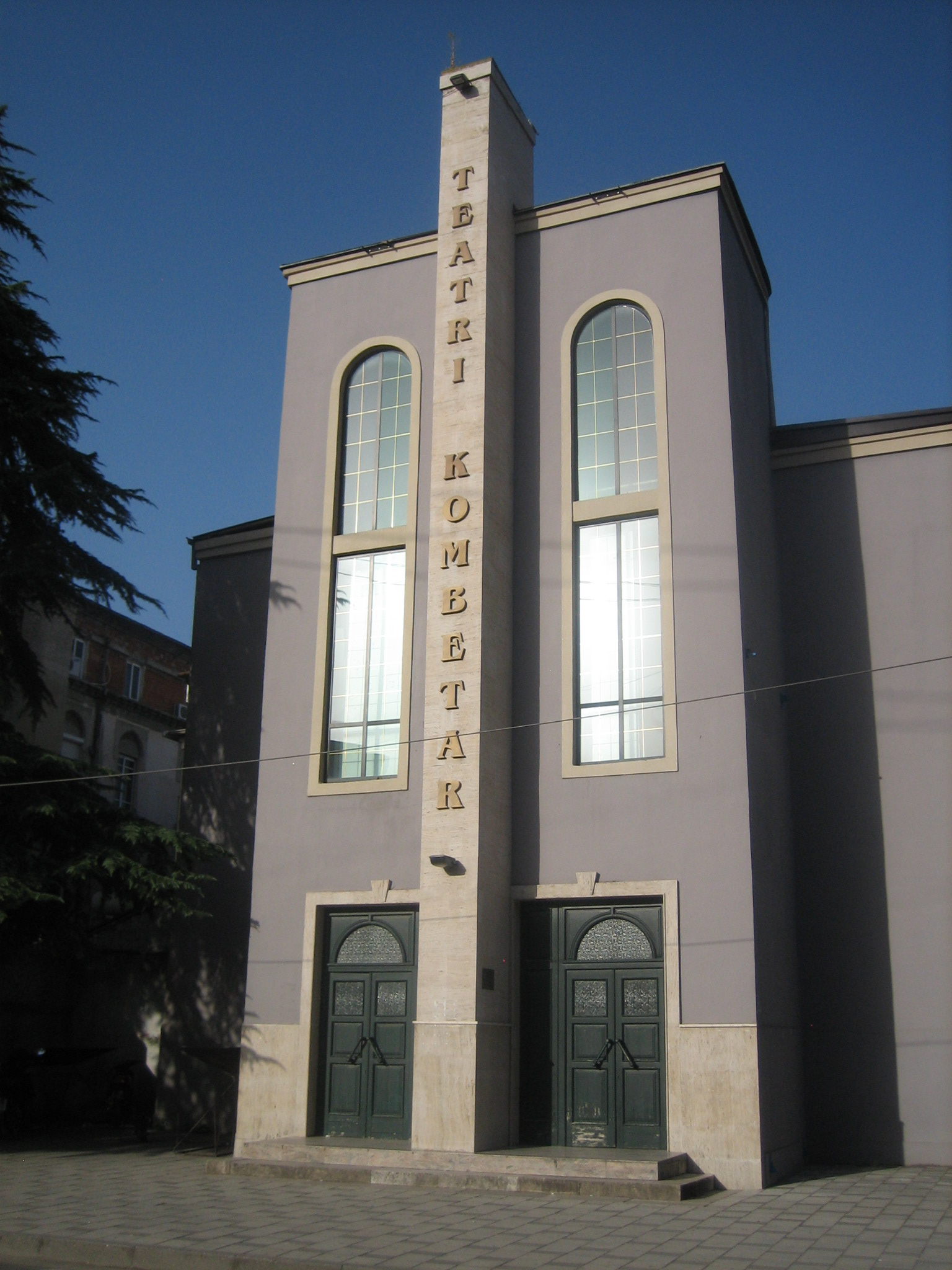
The National Theatre in 2009

- 17 May – The National Theatre in Tirana was demolished after a two-year debate to conserve and protect it.

=== December ===
- December 8 – The Albanian police's killing of 25-year-old Klodjan Rasha, who had violated the country's COVID-19 nightly curfew, resulted in several nights of violent rioting in Tirana.
- December 29 – Albania's prime minister Edi Rama replaces foreign minister Gent Cakaj, who had resigned, with former defense minister Olta Xhaçka. Xhaçka's defense ministry seat is filled by Niko Peleshi. The prime minister gave no reason for the government reshuffle.

== Deaths ==
=== February ===
- February 7 – Nexhmije Pagarusha, singer and actress (b. 1933).
- February 26 – Nexhmije Hoxha, politician (b. 1921).
- February 29 – Vito Kapo, politician (b. 1922).

== See also ==
- List of years in Albania
- 2020 in Albania
