= 1971 in Albania =

- Decades: 1950s; 1960s; 1970s; 1980s; 1990s
- See also: Other events of 1971; List of years in Albania

The following lists events that happened during 1971 in the People's Republic of Albania.

== Incumbents ==
- First Secretary: Enver Hoxha
- Chairman of the Presidium of the People's Assembly: Haxhi Lleshi
- Prime Minister: Mehmet Shehu

== Events ==
- 17 February - UEFA Euro 1972 qualifying: Albania is defeated by West Germany 0-1 at Qemal Stafa Stadium, Tirana
- 18 April - 1972 Summer Olympics qualifier: Albania is defeated by Romania 1-2 at Stadionul Republicii, Bucharest (Note: Match considered official by Albania but not by their opponents.)
- 12 May - UEFA Euro 1972 qualifying: Albania ties with Poland 1-1 at Qemal Stafa Stadium, Tirana
- 26 May - 1972 Summer Olympics qualifier: Albania is defeated by Romania 1-2 at Qemal Stafa Stadium, Tirana
- 12 June - UEFA Euro 1972 qualifying: Albania defeated by West Germany at Wildparkstadion, Karlsruhe
- 1-7 November: 6th Congress of the Party of Labour of Albania
- 14 November - UEFA Euro 1972 qualifying: Albania defeats Turkey 3-0 at Qemal Stafa Stadium, Tirana
