= 2022 in Albania =

- Decades: 2000s; 2010s; 2020s
- See also: Other events of 2022; List of years in Albania

Events in the year 2022 in Albania.

== Incumbents ==
- President: Ilir Meta (until 28 July) Bajram Begaj (from 24 July)
- Prime Minister: Edi Rama
- Deputy Prime Minister: Arben Ahmetaj (until 28 July); Belinda Balluku (from 28 July)

== Events ==
Ongoing — COVID-19 pandemic in Albania (Until 1 April)

=== March ===
- 8 March – Albanian consulate in Kharkiv is destroyed during Russian shelling. No casualties are reported.

=== April ===
- 1 April - Albania transited to the endemic phase.

=== May ===
- 25 May - The 2022 UEFA Europa Conference League Final takes place at the Arena Kombëtare in Tirana. Roma defeats Feyenoord 1–0.

=== June ===
- 16 May - 4 June - The 2022 Albanian presidential election takes place. After three sessions in which the proposed candidates failed to obtain the necessary votes, the Parliament of Albania elects Chief of the General Staff Bajram Begaj as the new Albanian President.

=== July ===
- 19 July - Negotiations on the accession of North Macedonia and Albania to the European Union begin in Brussels.
- 24 July - Former President Bujar Nishani died from COVID-19 Omicron complications.

=== November ===
- 12 November - Protests erupt in Tirana, Albania over rising costs of living, poverty, and the migrant surge to Britain from Albania.

== Deaths ==
- 15 January - Ramazan Rragami, footballer (b. 1944)
- 22 January - Robert Jashari, footballer (b. 1938)
- 18 February - Bardhyl Londo, writer and poet (b. 1948)
- 24 February - Luan Starova, writer (b. 1941)
- 6 May - Hajdar Muneka, journalist (b. 1954)
- 28 May - Bujar Nishani, politician (b. 1966)
- 16 August - Pandi Siku, actor
- 22 September - Sali Shijaku, painter (b. 1933)
