= 1972 in Albania =

- Decades: 1950s; 1960s; 1970s; 1980s; 1990s
- See also: Other events of 1972; List of years in Albania

The following lists events that happened during 1972 in the People's Republic of Albania.

== Incumbents ==
- First Secretary: Enver Hoxha
- Chairman of the Presidium of the People's Assembly: Haxhi Lleshi
- Prime Minister: Mehmet Shehu

== Events ==
- 2 May - 1972 Balkans Cup: Albania defeats Greece 2–1 at Selman Stërmasi Stadium, Tirana
- 16 May - 1972 Balkans Cup: Albania is defeated by Greece 0–2 at Anthi Karagianni Stadium, Kavala
- 17 September - 1972 Balkans Cup: Albania ties with Yugoslavia 1–1 at Toše Proeski Arena, Skopje
- 24 September - 1972 Balkans Cup: Albania ties with Yugoslavia 1–1 at Selman Stërmasi Stadium, Tirana
