= 1979 in Albania =

- Decades: 1950s; 1960s; 1970s; 1980s; 1990s
- See also: Other events of 1979; List of years in Albania

The following lists events that happened during 1979 in the People's Republic of Albania.

== Incumbents ==
- First Secretary: Enver Hoxha
- Chairman of the Presidium of the People's Assembly: Haxhi Lleshi
- Prime Minister: Mehmet Shehu

== Events ==
- 14 March - 1979–80 Balkans Cup: Albania is defeated by Yugoslavia 3-0 at Stadion Kantrida, Rijeka
- 28 March - 1979–80 Balkans Cup: Albania is defeated by Greece 3-0 at Zosimades Stadium, Ioannina
- 18 April - 1979–80 Balkans Cup: Albania defeats Yugoslavia 4-1 at Selman Stërmasi Stadium, Tirana
- 16 May - 1979–80 Balkans Cup: Albania defeats Greece 2-0 at Selman Stërmasi Stadium, Tirana
