= 2017 in Albania =

- Decades: 1990s; 2000s; 2010s; 2020s
- See also: Other events of 2017; List of years in Albania

The following lists events in the year 2017 in Albania.

== Incumbents ==
- President: Bujar Nishani (until April 28), Ilir Meta (from April 28)
- Prime Minister: Edi Rama
- Deputy Prime Minister:
  - until 22 May: Niko Peleshi
  - 22 May-13 September: Ledina Mandia
  - from 13 September: Senida Mesi

== Events ==
=== February ===
- 18 February - The opposition during a protest held in Tirana, announced that all the opposition parties will boycott the parliament because of the current situation in the country.

=== March ===
- 12 March - Four ministers of the government resign amid corruption accusations by the opposition.

=== April ===
- 4 April - The opposition announced that the opposition parties would boycott the June legislative elections if their demands are not met.
- 28 April - The fourth round of the presidential election was held. The opposition boycotted the election, while the majority chose the incumbent Speaker of the Assembly of the Republic and former Prime Minister Ilir Meta as President of Albania with 87 votes.

=== May ===
- 9 May - Albania competes in the Eurovision Song Contest 2017 with Lindita Halimi and her song World but fails to qualify for the grand final
- 18 May - Political leaders met in Tirana, accepting the package deal offered by the EU and US. The political crisis came to an end.
- 23 May - New caretaker government voted in the parliament. Six ministers and the vice-prime minister, proposed by the opposition, were voted by majority.

=== June ===
- 25 June - Voters go to the polls to vote in a parliamentary election which would determine the EU's enlargement with Albania joining.

=== December ===
- 1 December At least one person dies after heavy flooding with another three injured and 18 homes destroyed.

== Deaths ==
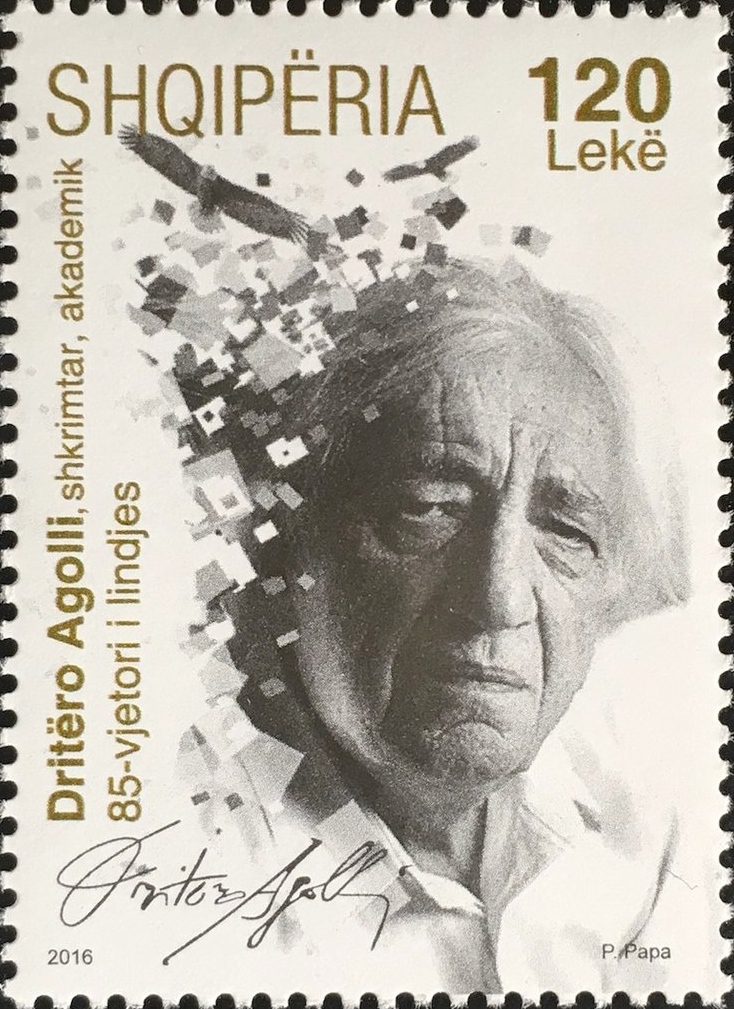
Dritëro Agolli

- 3 February – Dritëro Agolli, writer and politician (b. 1931).
