= 2009 in Albania =

- Decades: 1980s; 1990s; 2000s; 2010s; 2020s
- See also: Other events of 2009; List of years in Albania

The following lists events that happened during 2009 in Republic of Albania.

== Incumbents ==
- President: Bamir Topi
- Prime Minister: Sali Berisha (re-elected)
- Deputy Prime Minister: Ilir Rusmali (until 10 September); Ilir Meta (from 10 September)

== Events ==
=== April ===
- 2 April - Albania officially joins NATO and formally applies for membership of the European Union.

=== July ===
- Sali Berisha's centre-right Democratic Party wins parliamentary elections by a narrow margin.

=== November ===
- Opposition Socialist Party begins series of demonstrations in Tirana in protest at alleged vote-rigging in the parliamentary election.

== Deaths ==
- 24 March - Ali Progri, Albanian engineer
- 14 July - Kujtim Majaci, Albanian football player
- 21 November - Teki Biçoku, Albanian geologist and former member and president of the Academy of Sciences of Albania.

== See also ==
- 2009 in Albanian television
