= 2021 in Albania =

- Decades: 2000s; 2010s; 2020s
- See also: Other events of 2021; List of years in Albania

Events in the year 2021 in Albania.

== Incumbents ==
- President: Ilir Meta
- Prime Minister: Edi Rama
- Deputy Prime Minister: Erion Braçe (until 18 September); Arben Ahmetaj (from 18 September)

== Events ==
Ongoing — COVID-19 pandemic in Albania

=== April ===
- 19 April – A mass stabbing at a mosque in Tirana leaves five worshipers injured.
- 25 April – The 2021 Albanian parliamentary election.

=== June ===
- 11 June – During the 2021 United Nations Security Council Elections, Albania was elected to serve a two-year term, beginning in 2022, as a non-permanent member of the UN Security Council. It will be the first time Albania has sat on the Security Council.

== Deaths ==
- 1 January – Dhimitër Orgocka, actor and director, People's Artist of Albania (b. 1936).
- 1 March – Agim Krajka, composer (born 1937).
