= 2016 in Albania =

- Decades: 1990s; 2000s; 2010s; 2020s
- See also: Other events of 2016; List of years in Albania

The following lists events that happened during 2016 in the Republic of Albania.

== Incumbents ==
- President: Bujar Nishani
- Prime Minister: Edi Rama
- Deputy Prime Minister: Niko Peleshi

== Events ==
- January-
- 7 January: Two days of heavy rain caused flash floods, river overflow and landslides in several parts of the country, including the counties of Tirana, Durrës, Lezhë, Shkodër and Dibër. More than 100 people were evacuated.
- February-
- 14 February: U.S Secretary of State John Kerry visited Albania on the 25th anniversary of the bilateral relations between the two countries to encourage anti-corruption measures
- March-
- 11 March: The manager of Regency Casino, Jim Backlund, from Sweden, committed suicide after jumping from his third-floor hotel balcony
- April-
- 20 April: An Australian female tourist was hiking on a cliff edge in Tropojë and fell to her death, A.V.Sh, age 56, who was hiking with her husband when she lost control, slipped and died.
- May-
- 10 May: Albania competes in the Eurovision Song Contest 2016 with Eneda Tarifa and her song "Fairytale" but fails to qualify for the grand final

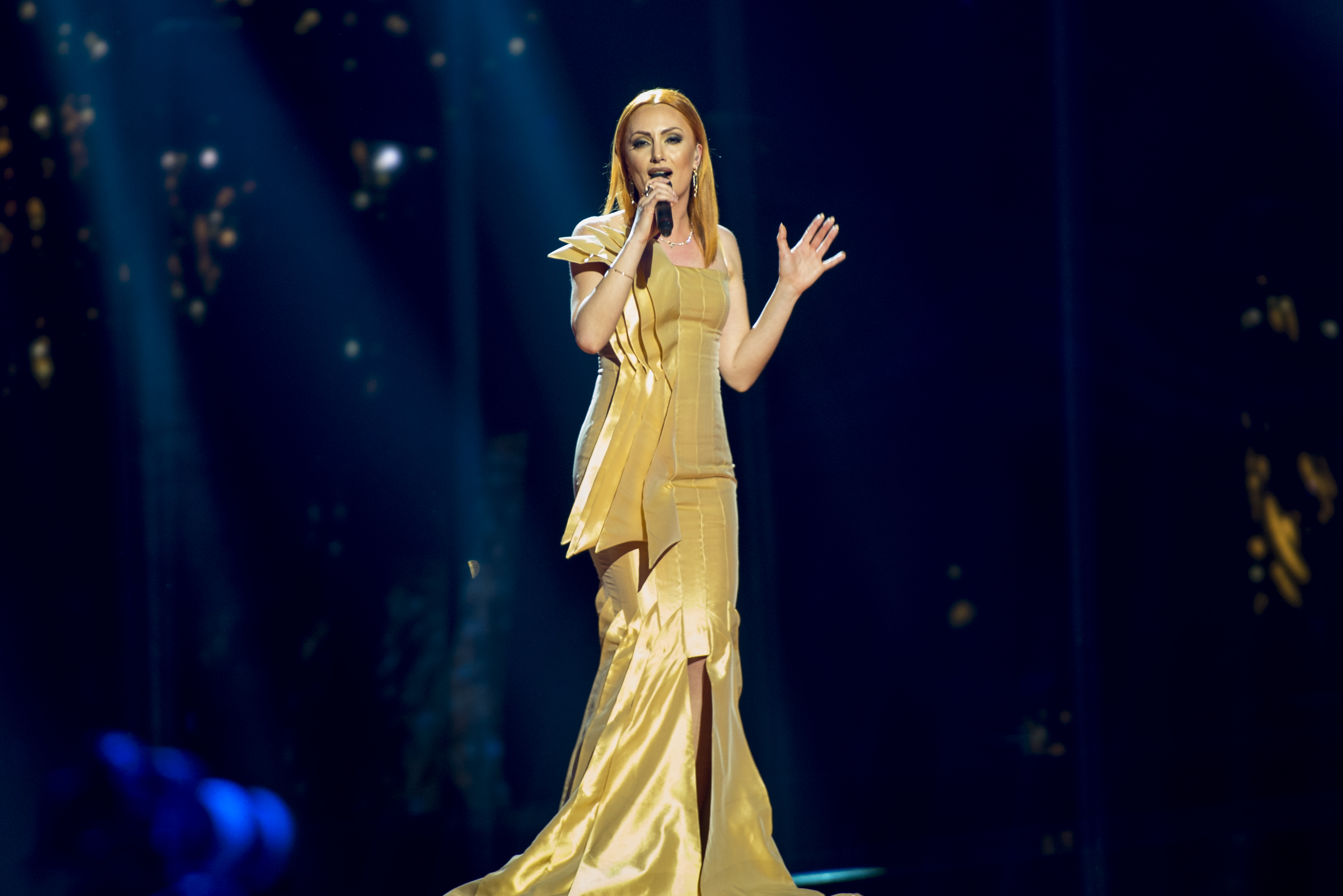
Albania at the Eurovision 2016

- June-
- 10 June: Albania participates for the first time in UEFA European Championship in France.
- 19 June: Albania wins its first ever football match against Romania after qualifying for its first ever major football event, they won the match 1-0 after Armando Sadiku's goal in the 43rd minute, they did not advance to the knockout stage, but did not come last in Group A.
- July-
- 21 July: The Parliament passes judiciary reform key to EU accession with 140 votes from 140 MP's.
- 25 July: Two people were shot to death in Vlorë, Ilir Deromemraj, 45 and Dhimiter Cani, 60, were shot in a betting cafeteria in the late-early hours of Sunday. A man poured gasoline onto Dashamir Saraçi, in the "Amerikan Spital" (American Hospital) in Tirana, the perpetrator, Lefter Çanaj, argued with the man before the incident after waiting to use the kidney dialysis machine, the perpetrator and two other women, Sanije Sulaj and Anife Mal, both died after being treated in the ward, a male nurse and an older male were treated with burns.
- August-
- 5-21 August: Albania competed at the 2016 Summer Olympics in Rio de Janeiro, Brazil.
- 6 August: A Russian tourist, Denis Kaiumov, 43, who was visiting Vlorë, died after Fatmir Kuci accidentally hit Denis with his sailboat when the Russian tourist was on a speed-boat, Fatmir was jailed for 20 days.
- 7 August: A Norwegian tourist, Brigitte Fratske, 57, who was visiting her family in Sarandë unexpectedly died in her hotel, Police are investigating.
- 8 August: Two robbers steal 210 million lek from a bank in Tirana
- 12 August: A 12-year-old boy was decapitated by his mentally-ill uncle, Jorgo Zani, 31, of the Palasa village in Vlorë, the motives of the murder are unknown
- 17 August: A driver carrying 20 tourists from the Caribbean crashes while accidentally falling asleep on the Tepelena road in Gjirokastër.
- 25 August: A wildfire engulfs the forest area near the beach of Shëngjin, the flames were extended due to winds in the area, Shëngjin State Police have suspected it may be arson. 18,200 cannabis plants were destroyed in the town of Kalivaç, in Memaliaj but the owners were able to avoid capture.
- September-
- 5 September: The Albanian Parliament recommences work
- 9 September: The remaining members of the People's Mujahideen Organization of Iran (PMOI), an exiled Iranian opposition group based in Iraq for decades arrived in Tirana for resettlement in Albania.
- 11 September: Partial elections are held in Dibër and they are won by the Socialist Party of Albania.
- 29 September: the Enlargement Commissioner of the European Union Johannes Hahn mentioned the Cham issue as an "existing one" between Albania and Greece, alongside other matters that the two countries needed to resolve.
- 30 September: The inauguration ceremony of the commence of works for the Trans Adriatic Pipeline in Albania.
- October
- 8 October: Leka II, Crown Prince of Albania married Elia Zaharia in a semi-official ceremony in Tirana.
- November-
- 5 November: 38 Martyrs of the Catholic Church executed by the communist regime in Albania, were beatified by the Vatican in a mass organized at St. Stefan Church in Shkodra.
- 8 November: Heavy rainfall caused heavy flooding in major Albanian cities, leaving 3 people dead. Schools were closed for two days and the army and emergency services began to evacuate people from emergency areas.
- 9 November: The European Commission recommended the launch of negotiations with Albania, for the Accession of Albania to the European Union.
- 10 November: Google launched Google Street View for Albania.
- 20 November: Albania will compete in the Junior Eurovision Song Contest 2016 in Valletta, Malta. They selected Klesta Qehaja and "Besoj" (Believe)
