= 2018 in Albania =

- Decades: 1990s; 2000s; 2010s; 2020s
- See also: Other events of 2018; List of years in Albania

Events in the year 2018 in Albania.

== Incumbents ==
- President: Ilir Meta
- Prime Minister: Edi Rama
- Deputy Prime Minister: Senida Mesi

== Events ==
=== May ===
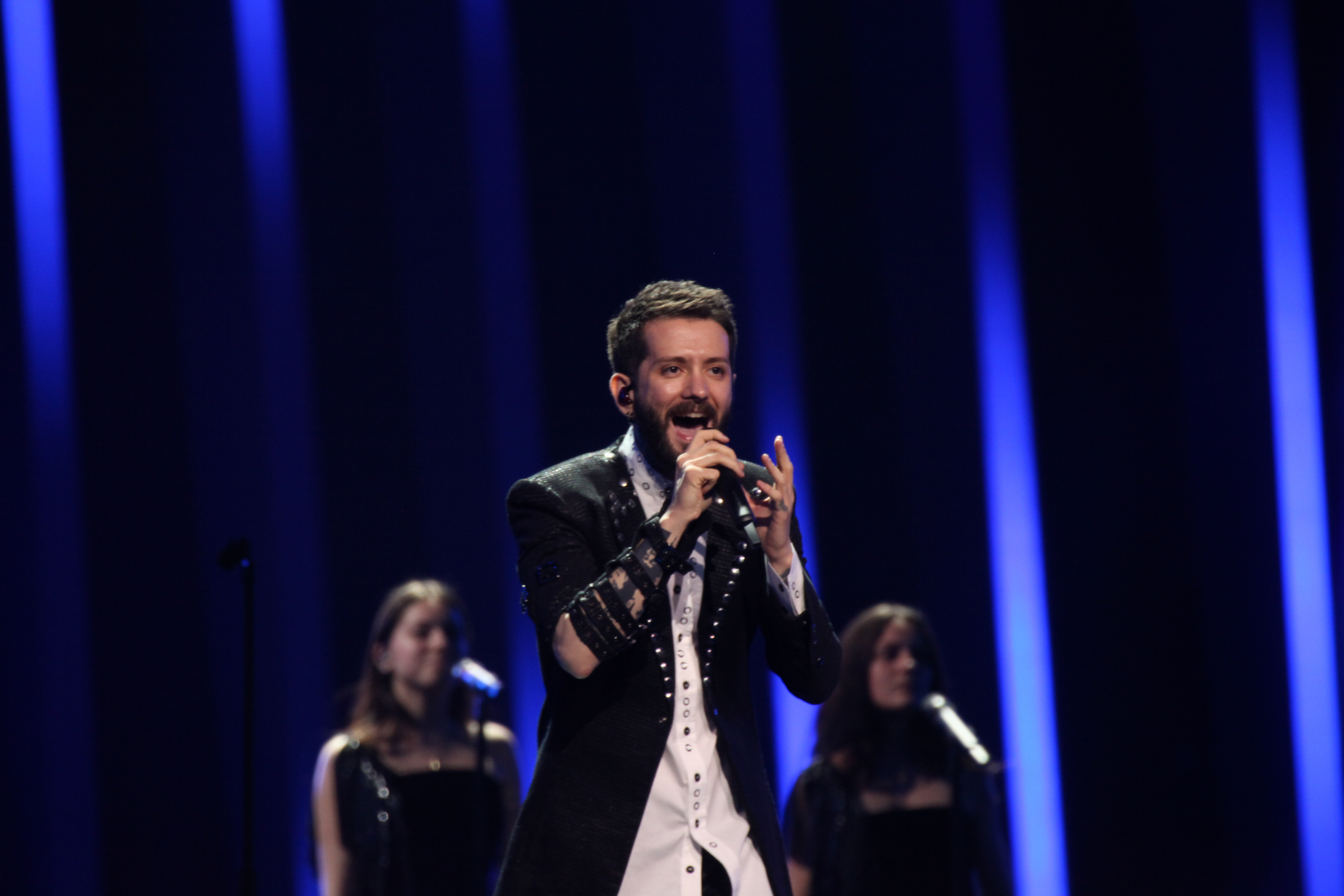
Bushpepa Performing at the Eurovision 2018.

- 8–12 May - Albania Competed at the Eurovision Song Contest 2018, Eugent Bushpepa with The song Mall and placed 11th on the final.

=== December ===
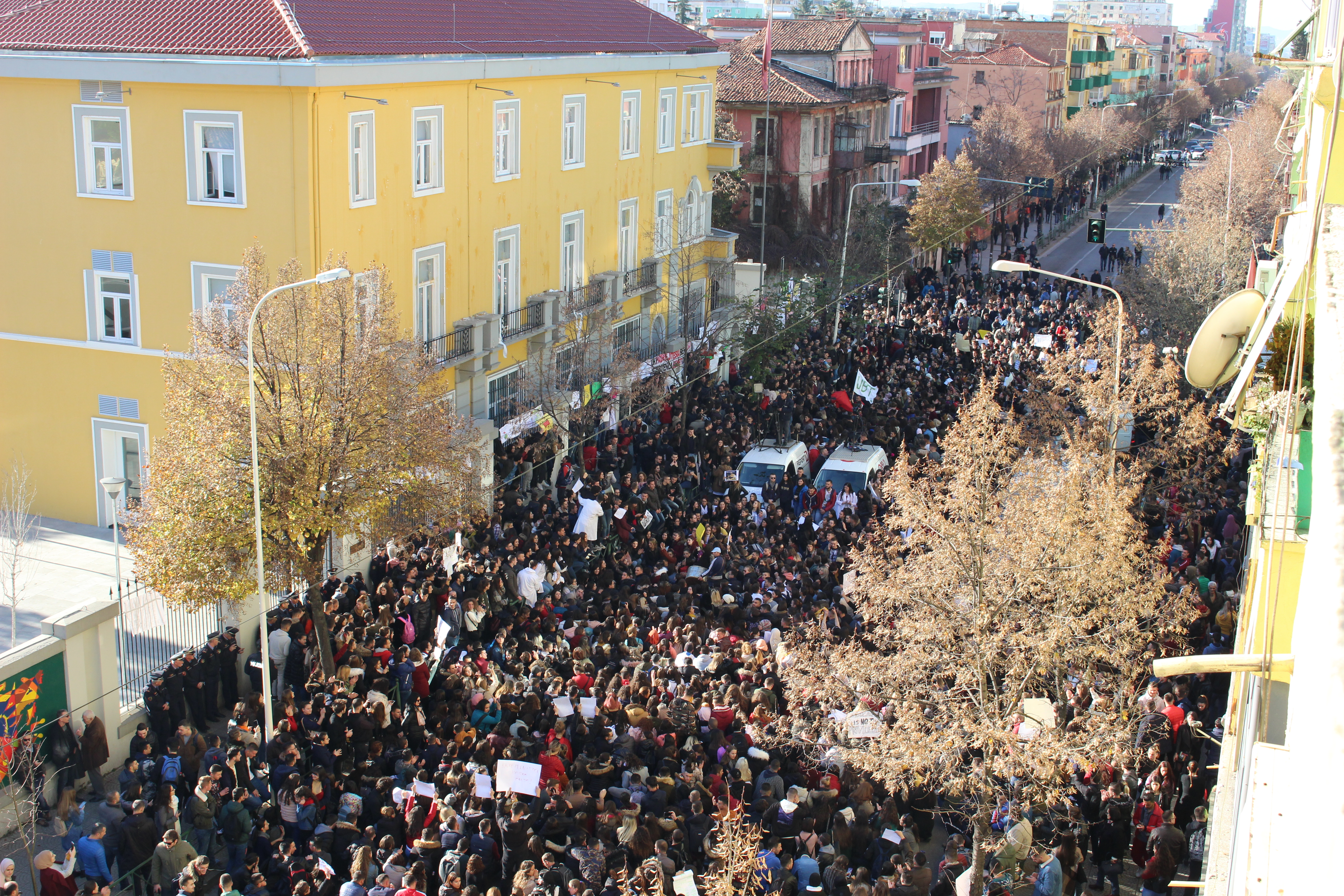
Protesters outside the Ministry of Education

- 4 December – Beginning of the 2018–19 student protest

=== Sports ===
- 9 to 25 February – Albania participated at the 2018 Winter Olympics in PyeongChang, South Korea, with 2 competitors in 1 sport (alpine skiing).

== Deaths ==
- 23 April – Liri Belishova, politician, and resistance member during World War II (b. 1926).
- 15 June – Rita Marko, politician (b. 1920).
- 1 August – Gaqo Çako, opera singer (b. 1935).
- 11 October – Fatos Arapi, poet (b. 1930).
- 2 December – Luan Qerimi, actor (b. 1929).
