= 1963 in Albania =

- Decades: 1940s; 1950s; 1960s; 1970s; 1980s
- See also: Other events of 1963; List of years in Albania

This is a list of events that occurred during 1963 in the People's Republic of Albania.

== Incumbents ==
- First Secretary: Enver Hoxha
- Chairman of the Presidium of the People's Assembly: Haxhi Lleshi
- Prime Minister: Mehmet Shehu

== Events ==
- 30 August - 1963–64 Balkans Cup: Albania is defeated by Turkey 1-0 at Mithat Paşa Stadium, Istanbul
- 17 October - 1963–64 Balkans Cup: Albania defeats Turkey 2-0 at Selman Stërmasi Stadium, Tirana
- 5 December - 1963-64 Balkans Cup: Albania ties with Romania 1-1 at Selman Stërmasi Stadium, Tirana
