= 2012 in Albania =

- Decades: 1990s; 2000s; 2010s; 2020s
- See also: Other events of 2012; List of years in Albania

The following lists events that happened during 2012 in the Republic of Albania.

== Incumbents ==
- President: Bamir Topi (until 24 June), Bujar Nishani (starting 24 June)
- Prime Minister: Sali Berisha
- Deputy Prime Minister: Edmond Haxhinasto

== Events ==
=== May ===
- 21 May - occurred Qafa e Vishës bus accident near the town of Himara, causing the death of 13 people and 21 injured, most of them were students.

=== November ===
- The remains of former King Zog are repatriated to Albania from France, where he died in 1961.

=== September ===
- 21 September - start hunger strike of former politically persecuted in Albania (2012)

== Deaths ==
- 26 April - Ardian Klosi, Albanian publicist, albanologist, writer, translator and social activist
