= 1967 in Albania =

- Decades: 1940s; 1950s; 1960s; 1970s; 1980s
- See also: Other events of 1967; List of years in Albania

The following lists events that happened during 1967 in the People's Republic of Albania.

== Incumbents ==
- First Secretary: Enver Hoxha
- Chairman of the Presidium of the People's Assembly: Haxhi Lleshi
- Prime Minister: Mehmet Shehu

== Events ==
- 26 August — 1966–67 Balkans Cup: Albania defeats Turkey 2-0 at Selman Stërmasi Stadium, Tirana
- 3 September — 1966–67 Balkans Cup: Albania is defeated by Turkey 3-2 at Şükrü Saracoğlu Stadium, Istanbul
- 23 December — 1967–68 Balkans Cup: Albania defeats Bulgaria 4-0 at Loro Boriçi Stadium, Shkodër
