= 1990 in Albania =

- Decades: 1970s; 1980s; 1990s; 2000s; 2010s
- See also: Other events of 1990; List of years in Albania

The following lists events that happened during 1990 in Albania.

== Incumbents ==
- Prime Minister: Adil Carcani

== Events ==
- December 9 - Student demonstrators of Enver Hoxha University in Tirana march through the streets of the capital demanding an end to dictatorship, following radical reforms elsewhere in Eastern Europe.
- December 11 - The number of protesters reach nearly 3,000. The Thirteenth Plenum of the Albanian Party of Labor (APL) Central Committee is announced for February 1991.
- December 12 - The first opposition party of Albania, the Albanian Democratic Party (ADP) is formed.

== Births ==
- Ansi Nika
- Ardit Shehaj
- Arsen Sykaj
- Asion Daja
- Besart Abdurahimi
- Blerti Hajdari
- Brunild Pepa
- Florian Berisha
- Gers Delia
- Juxhin Xhaja
- Marigona Dragusha
- Odeon Bërdufi
- Orhan Mustafi
- Renaldo Rama
- Rita Ora
- Roland Peqini
- Sokol Cikalleshi
- Stivi Frasheri
- Sulejman Hoxha, footballer

== Deaths ==
- Rahman Morina, Kosovo police officer and political figure of Albanian descent

== See also ==
- Years in Albania
- 2007 in Albania
- 2011 in Albania
