= 2013 in Albania =

- Decades: 1990s; 2000s; 2010s; 2020s
- See also: Other events of 2013; List of years in Albania

The following lists events that happened during 2013 in the Republic of Albania.

== Incumbents ==
- President: Bujar Nishani
- Prime Minister: Sali Berisha (until 15 September), Edi Rama (starting 15 September)
- Deputy Prime Minister:
  - until 4 April: Edmond Haxhinasto
  - 4 April-15 September: Myqerem Tafaj
  - from 15 September: Niko Peleshi

== Events ==
=== June ===
- 23 June - Parliamentary elections are held, resulting in a victory for the Socialist Party of Albania.
- 30th Of June - Albanian Warning System Airs Test

=== September ===
- 15 September - Edi Rama is elected by Parliament as Prime Minister of Albania.
