= 2014 in Albania =

- Decades: 1990s; 2000s; 2010s; 2020s
- See also: Other events of 2014; List of years in Albania

The following lists events that happened during 2014 in the Republic of Albania.

== Incumbents ==
- President: Bujar Nishani
- Prime Minister: Edi Rama
- Deputy Prime Minister: Niko Peleshi

== Events ==
=== April ===
- April 11 - Montenegro, Norway, Iceland and Albania join the list of countries supporting sanctions including asset freezings and travel bans directed at Russian individuals due to the annexation of Crimea by the Russian Federation.

=== June ===
- June - The European Commission recommends Albania as a candidate for European Union membership.

=== September ===
- September 21 - Pope Francis celebrates Mass in Albania.

=== October ===
- October - Albania vs Serbia football match in Belgrade abandoned after brawls over Kosovo.

=== November ===
- November - Prime Minister Edi Rama's visit to Belgrade to mend bridges fails after he and Serbian counterpart Aleksandar Vucic row publicly over Kosovo.

== See also ==
- 2014 in Albanian television
