= Pirro Kondi =

Albanian politician (born 1924)

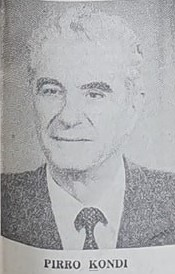

Pirro Kondi (1924–?) was an Albanian politician of the Party of Labour of Albania (PPSh). Coming from a family with strong communist background, he became member of the Albanian Parliament and a candidate-member of the Politburo of the Party of Labour of Albania by the '80.

== Early life ==
Kondi was born in Zagori, Albania in 1924. He was the brother of Albanian communist and youth activist Alqi Kondi, and former Government Minister Vito Kapo. He became member of the Albanian Communist Party and member of the Albanian resistance during World War II.

== Political career ==
In 1954, Kondi was elected for the first as a delegate in the People's Assembly (Alb: Kuvendi Popullor). He remained such from the third to the fifth legislative term until 1966. In addition, he was for many years a member of the Central Committee (CC) of the Party. At the 3rd Congress of the PPSh in June 1956, he was elected head of the Organization Department of the Central Committee. During the 5th Congress of the PPSh in November 1966, he was however "demoted" and was placed as candidate-member of the Central Committee.

Kondi served for some time as Party's First Secretary in Korçë, and Elbasan. In August 1985, he became the successor of Foto Çami as First Secretary of the Party of Tirana. This was the first personnel decision of the then First Secretary of the PPSh Ramiz Alia, after the death of Enver Hoxha and was considered a sign of maintaining its current political course, considering that Kondi was called between loyal supporters of Hoxha and had pushed multiple articles over Hoxha in the party newspaper Rruga e Partisë attacking internal party opponents of Hoxha such as Koçi Xoxe, Beqir Balluku, Mehmet Shehu, and others. From the other side, it shows Alia more as a moderate, since Çami, who was a moderate, moved on up as full member of the Politburo, where Alia's main battles were and most support was needed.

Although Kondi did not belong to that time top-leaders of the Party, he could support his political influence on family relationships. His sister Vito was for many years a member of the Central Committee, and later served as Minister of Industry and Energy. She was married to Hysni Kapo, a longtime Central Committee secretary and the closest confidant of Hoxha.

On the 9th Congress of the PPSh in November 1986, he also became candidate-member of the Politburo of the Party of Labour, and held that office until his retirement in December 1990.

Between 1987 and 1991, he was again a representative in the National Assembly. As Tirana's First Secretary of PPSh, he was directly involved in the political endeavors of the 1990 student protests in Albania (see Fall of communism in Albania).

== Accusations of war crimes ==
Together with Qirjako Mihali, and Sulejman Bushati he was accused in 1996 for "crimes against humanity" by a special court in Tirana, and in August 1996 a sentence of 17 years was given. The court verdict remained below the request of the prosecutor, who had requested 20 years in prison for him. Kondi was released short-after the 1997 turmoils. The Supreme Court of Albania declared Kondi innocent in 1999 and accorded to him an indemnity for the years spent in prison.

== Personal life and death ==
Kondi was also an American citizen, like his father, Stathi Kondi, who had emigrated to the United States in 1900. Stathi Kondi graduated as a doctor at Boston University.

During a 2015 interview, his sister, Vito Kapo, stated that Pirro Kondi had died sometime prior, and that his wishes to be cremated were not honoured.
