= 2015 in Albania =

- Decades: 1990s; 2000s; 2010s; 2020s
- See also: Other events of 2015; List of years in Albania

The following lists events that happened during 2015 in the Republic of Albania.

== Incumbents ==
- President: Bujar Nishani
- Prime Minister: Edi Rama
- Deputy Prime Minister: Niko Peleshi

== Events ==
- March - Socialist government announces plan to privatise state oil company Albpetrol, two years after previous Democratic Party government shelved it.

== Deaths ==
- 14 March - Petro Zheji, scientist, philosopher and translator
