= 2003 in Albania =

- Decades: 1980s; 1990s; 2000s; 2010s; 2020s
- See also: Other events of 2003; List of years in Albania

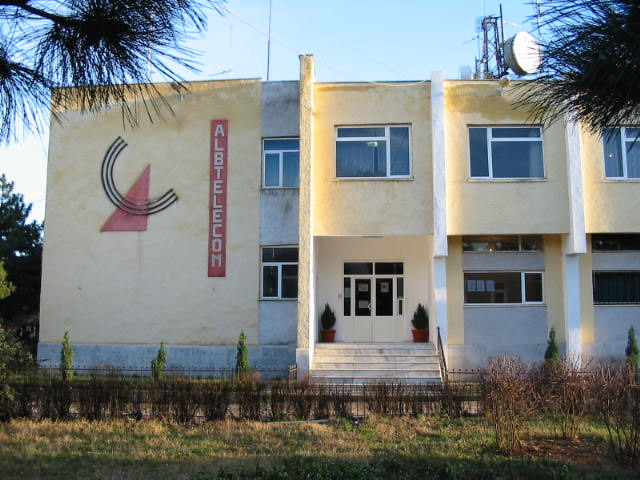

The following lists events that happened during 2003 in Republic of Albania.

== Incumbents ==
- President: Alfred Moisiu
- Prime Minister: Fatos Nano

== Events ==
=== January ===
- Albania and EU begin Stabilisation and Association Agreement talks, seen as possible first step in long road to EU membership.

=== October ===
- 12 October – Started Albanian Wikipedia.

== Deaths ==
- 13 March – Abas Ermenji, Albanian historian and politician (born 1913)
- 22 July – Dhimitër Shuteriqi, Albanian writer (born 1915)

== See also ==
- 2003 in Albanian television
