= 2010 in Albania =

- Decades: 1990s; 2000s; 2010s; 2020s
- See also: Other events of 2010; List of years in Albania

The following lists events that happened during 2010 in Republic of Albania.

== Incumbents ==
- President: Bamir Topi
- Prime Minister: Sali Berisha
- Deputy Prime Minister: Ilir Meta

== Events ==
=== November ===
- European Union rejects Albania's request for EU candidate status, but eases visa requirements for Albanians.

== Deaths ==
- 19 January - Panajot Pano, Albanian football player
- 28 March - Agim Qirjaqi, Albanian actor and television director
- 5 June - Esma Agolli, Albanian actress of stage and screen

== See also ==
- 2010 in Albanian television
