= 2008 in Albania =

- Decades: 1980s; 1990s; 2000s; 2010s; 2020s
- See also: Other events of 2008; List of years in Albania

The following lists events that happened during 2008 in Republic of Albania.

== Incumbents ==
- President: Bamir Topi
- Prime Minister: Sali Berisha
- Deputy Prime Minister: Ilir Rusmali

== Events ==
=== March ===
- 15 March - An explosion in a badly-maintained arms depot causes 16 deaths and over 300 injured, damaging Tirana airport. Defense minister Fatmir Mediu resigns.

=== June ===
- 12 June - Opposition Socialist Party leaves the Parliament, accusing the ruling Democratic Party of postponing voting on five new members of the Supreme Court awaiting appointment by President Bamir Topi.

== Deaths ==
- 25 October - Bashkim Gazidede, Albanian mathematician, author, politician and a chief of the national intelligence agency
- 23 May - Dritan Hoxha, Albanian businessman, founder of Top Media
- 26 March - Hekuran Isai, Albanian politician of the Albanian Party of Labour

== See also ==
- 2008 in Albanian television
