= 1958 in Albania =

- Decades: 1930s; 1940s; 1950s; 1960s; 1970s
- See also: Other events of 1958; List of years in Albania

The following lists events that happened during 1958 in the People's Republic of Albania.

== Incumbents ==
- First Secretary: Enver Hoxha
- Chairman of the Presidium of the People's Assembly: Haxhi Lleshi
- Prime Minister: Mehmet Shehu

== Events ==
- 1 June - 1958 Albanian parliamentary election
