= 2004 in Albania =

- Decades: 1980s; 1990s; 2000s; 2010s; 2020s
- See also: Other events of 2004; List of years in Albania

The following lists events that happened during 2004 in Republic of Albania.

== Incumbents ==
- President: Alfred Moisiu
- Prime Minister: Fatos Nano

== Events ==
=== February ===
- Opposition stages angry demonstration in Tirana to demand Mr Nano's resignation and protest against government failure to improve living standards.

=== May ===
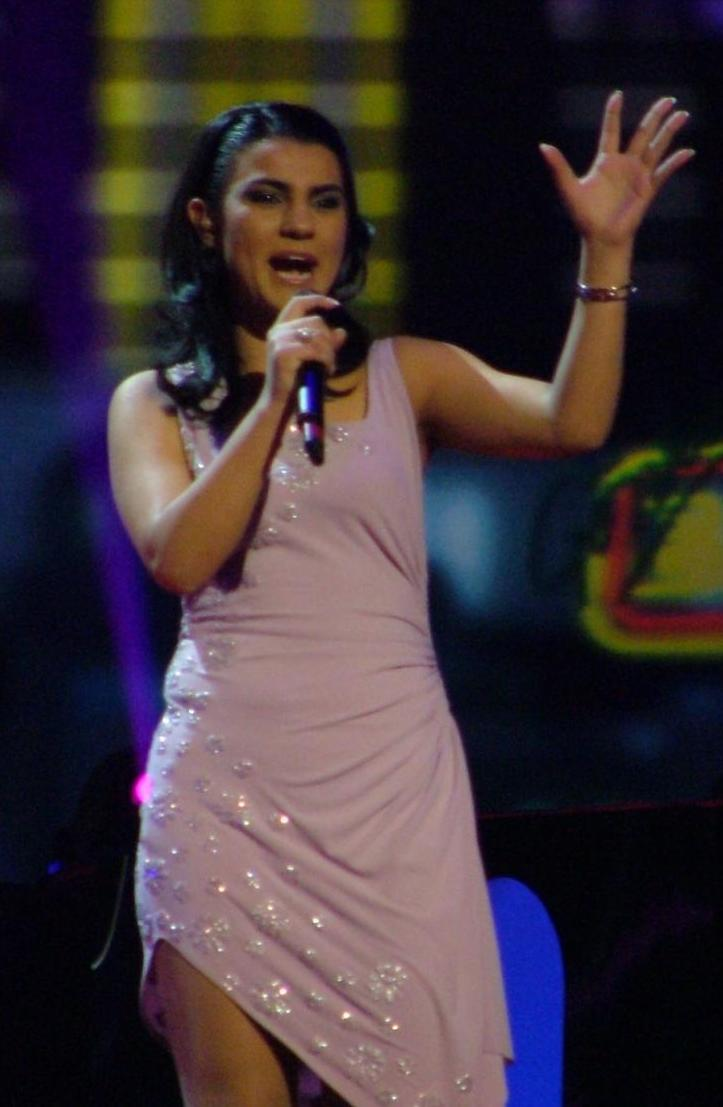
Anjeza Shahini performing "The Image of You" at the semi-final.

- In its first appearance in the competition, Albania is represented at the Eurovision Song Contest 2004 by Anjeza Shahini, who places 7th with the song "The Image of You".

=== July ===
- July 17: Susan of Albania, wife of the pretender Leka, Crown Prince of Albania, dies of lung cancer in Tirana.

=== September ===
- September 4: The political party Socialist Movement for Integration is formed by former prime minister Ilir Meta.

=== December ===
- Edi Rama, Mayor of Tirana elected World Mayor 2004.

== See also ==
- 2004 in Albanian television
