= COVID-19 vaccination in Albania =

COVID-19 vaccination campaign in Albania
- Native name: Fushata e vaksinimit kundër Covid-19
- Date: 11 January 2021 – present
- Location: Albania
- Cause: COVID-19 pandemic
- Organised by: Ministry of Health and Social Protection
- Participants: 2,170,000 people as target population 2,839,483 doses administered (13 May 2022) (including Albanians vaccinated abroad); 1,299,743 people vaccinated with at least one dose (13 May 2022) 59.9% 1,239,601 people fully vaccinated (13 May 2022) 57.1% 300,046 people boostered (13 May 2022) 13.8%
- Website: Ministry of Health

The COVID-19 vaccination campaign in Albania is a mass immunization campaign that was put in place by the Albanian authorities in order to respond to the ongoing COVID-19 pandemic. It started on 11 January 2021.

== Vaccination program ==
In the first months of the vaccination campaign, the governmental agencies targeted the health medical and administrative personnel, together with the guests and personnel of nursing homes.

=== Vaccines ===
Albania made efforts early in the pandemic to provide a sufficient number of doses for its citizens. The first agreement was made through COVAX to provide vaccines for 20% of the total population. The agreement of about 4 million dollars with GAVI was ratified in the parliament on 21 October 2020, from where Albania became a beneficiary for the vaccine with self-financing from this program. In total through the COVAX mechanism, the country has provided 1,140,000 doses for about 560 thousand people or 20% of the population. The vaccines in question are to be Oxford-AstraZeneca and Pfizer-BioNTech, which both are approved by the WHO. In the first round of distribution from February to May, there are 120,000 AstraZeneca vaccines confirmed. While in the second round, April–June, 23,400 doses of Pfizer were confirmed.

Seeing that this way of providing vaccines would not be able to provide a vaccine in the first days of their distribution in Europe, and since it was left out of distribution by the union as it is not a member of it, senior state officials tried to enter into a direct contract with Pfizer in late December 2020.

Unlike normal times when the approval of drugs and medical devices is done by the relevant agency called the National Agency of Drugs and Medical Devices, during an epidemic and events of public health importance the approval of vaccines is under the responsibility of the government through the Ministry of Health. The decisions are taken in consultation with the Central Committee of Experts, which is set up in cases of epidemics or national medical emergencies and serves as a consultative body under the Ministry of Health. The Committee is composed of experts from the ministry itself, the Institute of Public Health, the National Emergency Center, National Infectious Diseases Service, and representatives of health institutions depending on the situation. Albanian state bodies have approved four vaccines so far, which are: Pfizer–BioNTech; Oxford–AstraZeneca; Sputnik V; and CoronaVac.

On 1 January 2021, the Prime Minister of Albania Edi Rama announced the reaching of an agreement with the company Pfizer for a total of 500 thousand doses. The arrival of vaccines from the Pfizer will be divided batches, starting with the first batch that should come at the end of January and will continue for several months. However, it was later postponed to early February by the company itself due to investments to increase its production capacity. Despite the direct agreement with the company, a first batch of Pfizer vaccines was delivered by an undisclosed EU member state, consisting of 975 doses.

On 1 February 2021, 1,170 more doses of the Pfizer vaccine arrived in Albania.

As of 12 March 2021, 23,325 people got vaccinated in Albania, and 38,400 new vaccines arrived by AstraZeneca. An additional 40,800 doses of AstraZeneca vaccine arrived in Albania on 17 April, through the COVAX mechanism.

On 21 March 2021, Albania received 10,000 doses of Sputnik V vaccine which were donated by the United Arab Emirates, while 2 days later the Parliament approved a preliminary agreement for the supply of the CoronaVac vaccine.

On 21 March 2021, Albania managed to provide 1 million doses through the Turkish distribution company Keymen İlaç for the CoronaVac vaccine produced by the Chinese company Sinovac Biotech. The agreement is divided into two parts, where the first part foresees the provision of 500,000 doses of vaccine within 60 days and the other half will be renegotiated afterward. The first batch of 192,000 doses was shipped on the same day of signing while another 100,000 were shipped on April 8. The final batch of 208,000 vaccines, part of the initial agreement, was sent on 19 April. With such an amount of vaccines, Albania started on 28 March the mass vaccination of its population. According to the Ministry of Health, the administered doses reach from 10 to 15 thousand daily, but the capabilities are much more, taking into account the involvement of the military medical staff.

On 26 March 2021, vaccination for the elderly over 80 years began with the Sputnik V vaccine. According to Rama, another 25 thousand doses of this vaccine are expected to come but did not specify whether these will be donations as the previous 10 thousand or will be purchased from the manufacturing company.

Health Minister Ogerta Manastirliu announced that vaccination of ages 65+ is expected to begin within the week, and that 500,000 people will have received at least one dose within May 2021.

On 18 April 2021, a quantity of 50,000 vaccines Covishield, which is the brand name of the AstraZeneca vaccine produced by the Serum Institute of India, were provided through the Vaccine Maitri initiative by the Indian Government and received at the airport by the Indian Ambassador accompanied by two Albanian ministers. The ambassador praised Albania as a friendly country, saying that an exception was made for the provision of vaccines in the country, although India itself has blocked their export due to the increase in cases.

On April 5, 12 19, and 26 through four deliveries, a total of 30,420 doses of the Pfizer vaccine were delivered as part of a direct contract with the company.

On 20 April 2021, the European Commissioner for Neighbourhood and Enlargement, Olivér Várhelyi, announced that the European Union would distribute 651,000 doses of the Pfizer vaccine to the six countries of the Western Balkans, from which Albania would receive 145,000 doses. Their distribution was undertaken by the Austrian Government, and deliveries will start in May and are expected to end in August.

On 7 April 2021, the Albanian government paved the way for an agreement to provide a preliminary amount of 50,000 of the Russian Sputnik V vaccine scheduled to arrive 10 days after the agreement was signed. Although the use of the Sputnik V vaccine had started earlier with 10,000 doses donated by the United Arab Emirates, an amount of which served as well as an evaluator of the vaccine in the country. It was on 30 April 2021 that the official approval of the vaccine in Albania was announced on the official website of the Russian Direct Investment Fund, which deals with the distribution and export of the vaccine. On the same day the first shipment of 25,000 doses was made.

During May, four deliveries of Pfizer and BioNTech vaccine were made in Albania with a total of 50,310 of this vaccine, most of which are through bilateral contracts and the other as part of the EU assistance program for the Western Balkans. On May 4, the parliament with some normative acts paved the way for the negotiation of the second part of the contract for the provision of SinoVac vaccines and at the same time the possibility of adding other Sputnik V vaccines. The first quantity of 60,000 doses from the second contract with the Turkish company that provides the vaccines produced by the Chinese SinoVac was sent on May 23 of the same month.

=== Vaccines on order ===
Vaccine name	Approval progress	Quantity	Doses arrived	Vaccine approved	Began administering
Pfizer/BioNTech	Approved	~3,075,000	735,635	10 January 2021	11 January 2021
Oxford-AstraZeneca	Approved	~1,100,000	249,200	11 January 2021	13 March 2021
Sputnik V	Approved	60,000	60,000	9 March 2021	26 March 2021
CoronaVac	Approved	1,500,000	1,000,000	9 March 2021	28 March 2021

== See also ==
- COVID-19 pandemic in Albania
- Deployment of COVID-19 vaccines
- Statistics of the COVID-19 vaccination
