= 1976 in Albania =

- Decades: 1950s; 1960s; 1970s; 1980s; 1990s
- See also: Other events of 1976; List of years in Albania

The following lists events that happened during 1976 in the People's Republic of Albania.

== Incumbents ==
- First Secretary: Enver Hoxha
- Chairman of the Presidium of the People's Assembly: Haxhi Lleshi
- Prime Minister: Mehmet Shehu

== Events ==
- 14 March - 1975–76 Albanian Cup: KF Tirana defeats KF Skënderbeu 3-1 at Qemal Stafa Stadium, Tirana
- 21 March - 1975–76 Albanian Cup: Skënderbeu is defeated 17 Nëntori (KF Tirana) 0-1 at Skënderbeu Stadium, Korçë
- 31 March - 1976 Balkans Cup: Albania is defeated by Yugoslavia 1-2 at Dinamo Stadium, Tirana
- 14 April - 1976 Balkans Cup: Albania defeats Greece 2-0 at Dinamo Stadium, Tirana
- 26 May - 1976 Balkans Cup: Albania defeats Greece 4-3 at Karaiskakis Stadium, Piraeus
- 12 May - 1976 Balkans Cup: Albania is defeated by Yugoslavia 1-2 at Stadion Maksimir, Zagreb
- 28 December - promulgation of the Constitution of the People's Socialist Republic of Albania.
