= 2000 in Albania =

- Decades: 1980s; 1990s; 2000s; 2010s; 2020s
- See also: Other events of 2000; List of years in Albania

The following lists events that happened during 2000 in Republic of Albania.

== Incumbents ==
- President: Rexhep Meidani
- Prime Minister: Ilir Meta

== Events ==
=== July ===
- July 7 - In a cabinet reshuffle, Ilir Gjoni replaces Luan Hajdaraga as defense minister.

== Deaths ==
- 28 May - Ihsan Toptani, Albanian activist and journalist.
- 19 October - Mahir Domi, Albanian linguist and academic (B.1915)
