= 1918 in Albania =

- Decades: 1910s; 1920s; 1930s
- See also: Other events of 1918; List of years in Albania

The following lists events that happened during 1918 in the Principality of Albania.

== Incumbents ==
- President: Turhan Përmeti, Chairman of the Provisional Government (starting 28 December)

== Events ==
November
World War I: The war ended with Albanian territory divided under Italian, Serbian, Greek and French military occupation.
December
Albanian leaders met at Durrës to discuss presentation of Albanian interests at the upcoming Paris Peace Conference.

== Births ==
- 22 April - Ibrahim Kodra, Albanian painter

== Deaths ==
- 11 February - Murat Toptani, Albanian poet, artist and activist of the Albanian National Awakening
