= 1999 in Albania =

- Decades: 1970s; 1980s; 1990s; 2000s; 2010s
- See also: Other events of 1999; List of years in Albania

The following lists events that happened during 1999 in Republic of Albania.

== Incumbents ==
- President: Rexhep Meidani
- Prime Minister: Pandeli Majko (until 29 October), Ilir Meta (starting from 29 October)

== Events ==
=== March ===
- 24 March - Nato air strikes against Yugoslav military targets. In Kosovo thousands flee attacks by Serb forces. Mass refugee exodus into Albania.

=== October ===
- Majko resigns as prime minister in October 1999, after losing Socialist Party leadership vote. 30-year-old Ilir Meta becomes Europe's youngest prime minister.
