= Progër =

- Administrative unit
- Location within Albania
- Coordinates: 40°42′N 20°56′E
- Country: Albania
- County: Korçë
- Municipality: Devoll

Population (2011)
  - Administrative unit: 3,988
- Time zone: UTC+1 (CET)
  - Summer (DST): UTC+2 (CEST)
- Postal Code: 7011
- Area Code: (0)873

Progër is a village and a former municipality in the Korçë County, south-eastern Albania. At the 2015 local government reform, it became a subdivision of the municipality of Devoll. The population at the 2011 census was 3,988. The municipal unit consists of the villages Progër, Mançurisht, Cangonj, Pilur, Vranisht, Bickë, Rakickë, and Shyec.

== Etymology ==
During the 17th century, many families migrated from Progonat to other areas of Albania in order to avoid heavy taxation and the Islamization campaigns of the Ottoman Empire. The migrants founded the commune Progër in Devoll. The name Progër is from Progonat, as the villagers were originally from there and named it after their native village.

== Demographics ==
In 1900, the village of Rakickë was a mixed village whose population consisted of 360 Albanians and 300 Orthodox Macedonians, though by the 1970s it had become a wholly Albanian-inhabited village.

During the late 2000s, linguists Klaus Steinke and Xhelal Ylli seeking to corroborate villages cited in past literature as being Slavic speaking, carried out fieldwork in some villages of the area. Rakickë and Shyec were noted as not having a Slavic-speaking population, with villagers speaking Albanian and older generations stating they have used only that language. Villagers from nearby Pustec municipality that speak a south Slavic language, being well informed about the situation of their minority and neighbouring villages, stated that they were not aware of anyone having spoken their language in Rakickë and Shyec.

== Notable people ==
- Ali Progri
