= 2024 in Albania =

- Decades: 2000s; 2010s; 2020s
- See also: Other events of 2024; List of years in Albania

Events in the year 2024 in Albania.

== Incumbents ==
- President: Bajram Begaj
- Prime Minister: Edi Rama
- Deputy Prime Minister: Belinda Balluku

== Events ==
=== January ===
- 29 January to 11 February – 2024 World Snooker Federation (WSF) Championships, in Golem.

=== February ===
- 22 February – The Parliament of Albania votes 77–0 to ratify an agreement with Italy to host migrants and asylum seekers trying to reach the country until 2029.

=== March ===
- 5 March – The Special Court on Corruption and Organized Crime imposes a two-year suspended sentence on Dhionisios Alfred Beleri, the mayor of Himare, for vote-buying, sparking a diplomatic row with Greece, where he is named as a candidate by the ruling New Democracy party for the 2024 European Parliament election.

=== April ===
- 2 April – A car carrying migrants plunges into the Vjosa River in Gjirokastër District, killing all eight people on board.

=== June ===
- 21 June – A massive power outage leaves several areas of the country without electricity.

=== July ===
- 1 July – Internationally-acclaimed author Ismail Kadare dies in a hospital in Tirana at the age of 88.
- 5 July – Dhionisios Alfred Beleri is removed as mayor of Himarë following his conviction for vote-buying.
- 11 July – Thousands of anti-government protesters gather outside the Prime Minister's office and the Presidential office building in Tirana, accusing Prime Minister Edi Rama of corruption and demanding his resignation, as well as the release of opposition leader Sali Berisha from house arrest.

=== August ===
- 4 August – An early election is held in Himarë to replace Dhionisios Alfred Beleri following his conviction and imprisonment. The vote is won by Vangjel Tavo of the Socialist Party.

=== September ===
- 11 September –
  - Former prime minister Sali Berisha is charged with corruption for allegedly abusing his office to help his son-in-law privatize public land for a real-estate project in Tirana.
  - The All Afghan Women's Summit is held in Tirana, during which more than 130 Afghan women gather to protest the crackdown on women's rights in Afghanistan by the Taliban.
- 22 September – Prime minister Edi Rama announces plans to create a new sovereign European microstate, the Sovereign State of the Bektashi Order, enclaved within Tirana.
- 30 September – A brawl breaks out in Parliament after Democratic Party MPs stage a protest over the conviction of lawmaker Ervin Salianji for slander.

=== October ===
- 3 October – A brawl breaks out in Parliament following a protest by Democratic Party MPs over the conviction of Ervin Salianji.
- 7 October – Riots break out in Tirana as police fire tear gas against opposition protestors, with the Democratic Party demanding a caretaker cabinet.
- 11 October – Italy opens two migrant processing centers in Shengjin and Gjader.
- 14 October – Italy initiates the transfer of migrants to Albania under a new agreement.
- 18 October – A court in Italy orders a halt to the Italian government's policy of sending migrants to Albania, citing rulings by the European Court of Justice regarding the safety of repatriating migrants to their countries of origin.
- 21 October – Former president Ilir Meta is arrested in Tirana by the SPAK on suspicion of corruption, money laundering and hiding personal income and property.

=== November ===
- 27 November – Former prime minister Sali Berisha is released from house arrest following a court order revoking his detention since 2023.

=== December ===
- 21 December – The government announces a one-year ban on TikTok beginning in 2025 amid outcry over the stabbing death of a teenager following a dispute that began on the social media platform.

== Arts and entertainment ==
- List of Albanian submissions for the Academy Award for Best International Feature Film

== Holidays ==
- 1–2 January – New Year holidays
- 14 March – Day of summer
- 22 March – Nowruz Day
- 31 March – Catholic Easter Sunday
- 10 April – Eid al-Fitr
- 1 May – Labour Day
- 5 May – Orthodox Easter
- 16 June – The Day of Kurban Bayram
- 5 September – Saint Teresa's Consecration Day
- 28 November – Flag and Independence Day
- 29 November – Liberation Day
- 8 December – National Youth Day
- 25 December - Christmas Day
