= 1998 in Albania =

- Decades: 1970s; 1980s; 1990s; 2000s; 2010s
- See also: Other events of 1998; List of years in Albania

The following lists events that happened during 1998 in Republic of Albania.

== Incumbents ==
- President: Rexhep Meidani
- Prime Minister: Fatos Nano (until 2 October), Pandeli Majko (starting from 2 October)

== Events ==
- Escalating unrest in Kosovo sends refugees across border into Albania.
- Violent anti-government street protests after prominent opposition Democratic Party politician, Azem Hajdari, shot dead by unidentified gunmen.
- Fatos Nano quits. Former student activist, Pandeli Majko, named as new prime minister.

== Deaths ==
- April - Kristaq Rama - Albanian sculptor, teacher and politician.
- 12 September - Azem Hajdari, Albanian politician (b. 1963)
