= 1964 in Albania =

- Decades: 1940s; 1950s; 1960s; 1970s; 1980s
- See also: Other events of 1964; List of years in Albania

The following lists events that happened during 1964 in the People's Republic of Albania.

== Incumbents ==
- First Secretary: Enver Hoxha
- Chairman of the Presidium of the People's Assembly: Haxhi Lleshi
- Prime Minister: Mehmet Shehu

== Events ==
- 8 April - 1963–64 Balkans Cup: Albania ties with Bulgaria 1-1 at Selman Stërmasi Stadium, Tirana
- 14 July - 1963-64 Balkans Cup: Albania ties with Bulgaria 1-1 at Stadion Georgi Asparuhov, Sofia
- 15 July - 1963-64 Balkans Cup: Albania is defeated by Romania 2-1 at Stadionul Giulești-Valentin Stănescu (1939), Bucharest
- 16 December - 1964–66 Balkans Cup: Albania ties with Bulgaria 0-0 at Qemal Stafa Stadium, Tirana
