= 2025 in Albania =

- Decades: 2000s; 2010s; 2020s
- See also: Other events of 2025; List of years in Albania

Events in the year 2025 in Albania.

== Incumbents ==
- President: Bajram Begaj
- Prime Minister: Edi Rama
- Deputy Prime Minister: Belinda Balluku

== Events ==
=== Scheduled ===
- 2024–25 Albanian Cup
- 2024–25 Kategoria Superiore
- Gjirokastër National Folk Festival

=== January ===
- 28 January – Italy takes migrants to its processing centers in Shengjin and Gjader for the third time despite continuing legal disputes; Rome’s court of appeals orders 43 migrants in question to be set free and transferred back to Italy.

=== February ===
- 10 February – Erion Veliaj, mayor of Tirana, is arrested on suspicion of corruption and money-laundering.

=== March ===
- 6 March – The government imposes a 12-month ban on TikTok in the country, citing incitement to violence and bullying, especially among children.
- 16 March – The Albanian Orthodox Church elects John Pelushi as its new patriarch. He is formally enthroned on 29 March.

=== May ===
- 11 May – 2025 Albanian parliamentary election: The Socialist Party wins a majority of seats in Parliament.
- 17 May – Albania finishes in eighth place at Eurovision 2025 in Switzerland.

=== September ===
- 3 September – FIFA issues a CHF161,500 ($200,000)-fine on the Albanian Football Federation over inappropriate behavior by fans in Tirana during a 2026 FIFA World Cup qualification match between the national team and Serbia in June.
- 11 September – Prime Minister Rama appoints an AI-generated character named Diella as a government minister in charge of overseeing public tenders as part of measures against corruption.
- 27 September – The Vjosa Wild River National Park is designated as a biosphere reserve by UNESCO.

=== October ===
- 6 October – A judge at the Tirana court of appeal is shot dead by a party to an ongoing case.

=== November ===
- 9 November – 2025 Albanian local elections
- 22 November – One person is killed in Devoll following days of flooding nationwide.

=== December ===
- 18 December – A brawl breaks out among MPs in Parliament during a vote to confirm a new Avokati i Popullit.

== Arts and entertainment ==
- List of Albanian submissions for the Academy Award for Best International Feature Film
- Tirana International Film Festival

== Holidays ==
- 1–2 January – New Year holidays
- 14 March – Day of summer
- 22 March – Nowruz Day
- 30 March – Eid al-Fitr
- 20 April – Catholic Easter Sunday
- 20 April – Orthodox Easter
- 1 May – Labour Day
- 6 June – The Day of Kurban Bayram
- 5 September – Saint Teresa's Consecration Day
- 28 November – Flag and Independence Day
- 29 November – Liberation Day
- 8 December – National Youth Day
- 25 December – Christmas Day

== Deaths ==
- 25 January – Anastasios of Albania, 95, Greek-born Orthodox prelate, archbishop of Tirana and All Albania (since 1992), multiple organ failure.
- 23 August – Artur Zheji, 63, journalist and television host.
- 28 August – Naun Shundi, 66, actor, director and playwright.
- 31 October – Fatos Nano, 73, Prime minister (1991, 1997–1998, 2002–2005).
- 29 November – Simon Kulli, 52, Roman Catholic prelate, bishop of Sapë (since 2017).
