= List of mayors of Korçë =

This is a list of mayors of Korçë who have served since the Albanian Declaration of Independence of 1912.

== Mayors (1992–present) ==
No.	Name	Term in office		Political Party
1	Gjergj Gjinko	1992	1996	Democratic Party of Albania
2	Robert Kotmilo	1996	2000	Democratic Party of Albania
3	Gjergj Duro	2000	2003	Socialist Party
4	Robert Damo	2003	2007	Democratic Party
5	Niko Peleshi	2007	2013	Socialist Party
6	Sotiraq Filo	2013	Incumbent	Socialist Party

== See also ==
- Politics of Albania
