= 2006 in Albania =

- Decades: 1980s; 1990s; 2000s; 2010s; 2020s
- See also: Other events of 2006; List of years in Albania

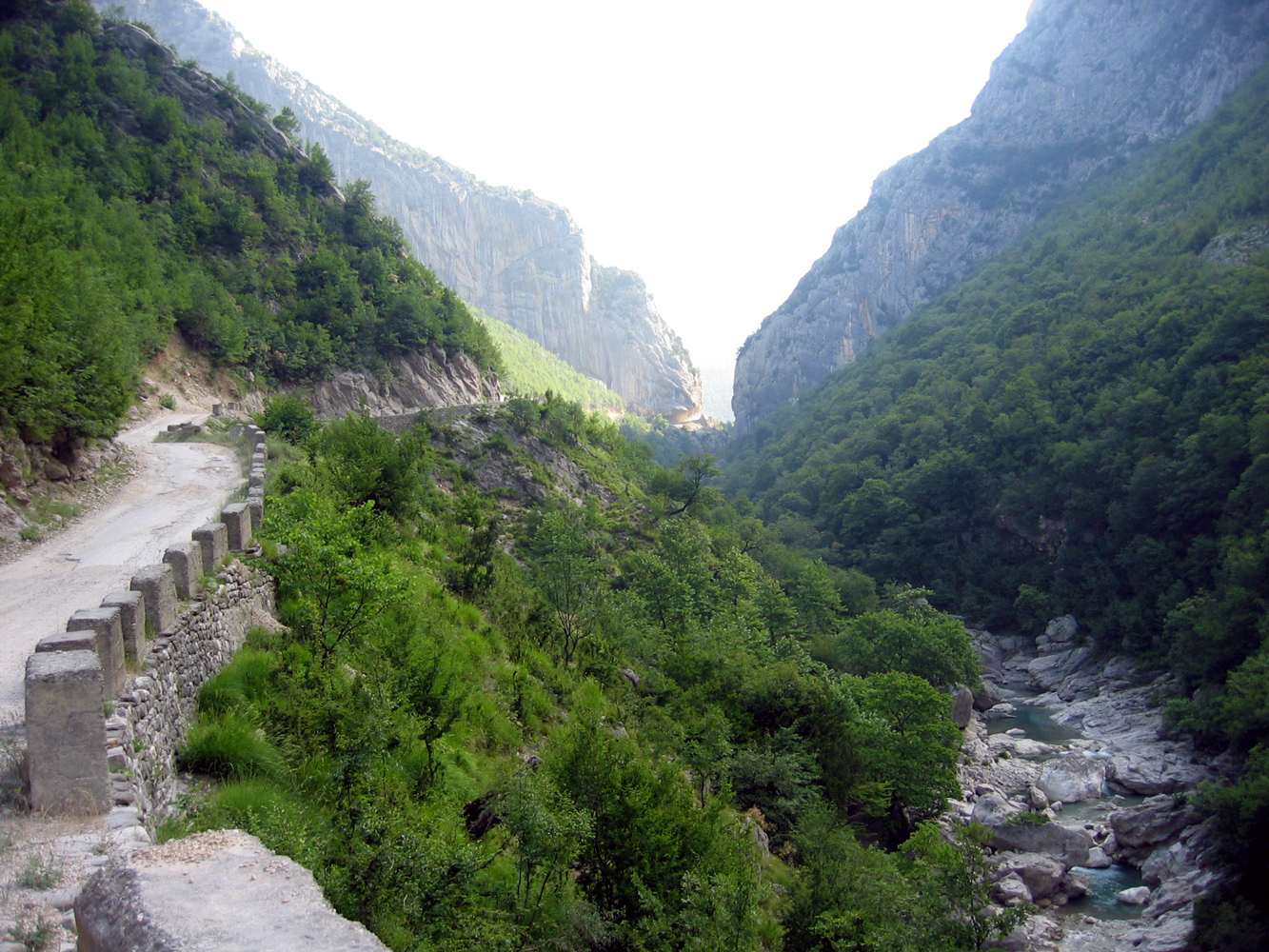
Gorge of the Tirana river in 2006.

The following lists events that happened during 2006 in the Republic of Albania.

== Incumbents ==
- President: Alfred Moisiu
- Prime Minister: Sali Berisha

== Events ==
=== April ===
- Parliament imposes a ban on speedboats in coastal waters in a bid to crack down on people and drug smuggling.

=== June ===
- Stabilisation and Association agreement signed with EU.

== Deaths ==
- 3 February - Vath Koreshi, Albanian writer and screenwriter
- 7 February - Ibrahim Kodra, Albanian painter
- 8 July - Pjetër Arbnori, Albanian politician, gulag survivor, "the Mandela of the Balkans"

== See also ==
- 2006 in Albanian television
