= 2001 in Albania =

- Decades: 1980s; 1990s; 2000s; 2010s; 2020s
- See also: Other events of 2001; List of years in Albania

The following lists events that happened during 2001 in Republic of Albania.

== Incumbents ==
- President: Rexhep Meidani
- Prime Minister: Ilir Meta

== Events ==
=== January ===
- Albania and Yugoslavia re-establish diplomatic relations broken off during the Kosovo crisis in 1999.

=== April ===
- UN says thousands of Albanians are being poisoned by fatal toxins in their environment, urges international community to help.

=== July ===
- Ruling Socialist Party secures second term in office by winning parliamentary election. PM Meta names European integration and an end to energy shortages as his priorities. Meta heads a new coalition government from September.

=== December ===
- Rift widens between Meta and his Socialist Party Chairman Fatos Nano. Nano prompts three ministers to resign and blocks the appointment of their replacements.

== Deaths ==
- 10 March - Fatmir Haxhiu, Albanian painter
- 22 August - Spiro Koleka, Albanian statesman, communist politician and a high-ranking military officer during World War II.
