= 2002 in Albania =

- Decades: 1980s; 1990s; 2000s; 2010s; 2020s
- See also: Other events of 2002; List of years in Albania

The following lists events that happened during 2002 in Republic of Albania.

== Incumbents ==
- President: Rexhep Meidani (until 24 July), Alfred Moisiu (starting 24 July)
- Prime Minister: Ilir Meta (until 22 February), Pandeli Majko (22 February - 31 July), Fatos Nano (starting 31 July)

== Events ==
=== January ===
- Meta resigns as prime minister after failing to resolve party feud.

=== February ===
- Pandeli Majko becomes premier and forms new government as rival factions in Socialist Party pledge to end infighting.

=== August ===
- Fatos Nano becomes prime minister after the ruling Socialist Party decides to merge the roles of premier and party chairman. It is Nano's fourth time as premier.

== Deaths ==
- 12 August - Teodor Keko, Albanian writer, journalist and politician
