= 2005 in Albania =

- Decades: 1980s; 1990s; 2000s; 2010s; 2020s
- See also: Other events of 2005; List of years in Albania

The following lists events that happened during 2005 in the Republic of Albania.

== Incumbents ==
- President: Alfred Moisiu
- Prime Minister: Fatos Nano (until 11 September), Sali Berisha (starting 11 September)

== Events ==
=== July ===
- July 3 - Albanians vote in parliamentary elections.

== See also ==
- 2005 in Albanian television
