= 1919 in Albania =

- Decades: 1910s; 1920s; 1930s
- See also: Other events of 1919; List of years in Albania

The following lists events that happened during 1919 in the Principality of Albania.

== Incumbents ==
- President: Turhan Përmeti, Chairman of the Provisional Government

== Events ==
January
Serbs attack Albania's inhabited cities. Albanians adopt guerrilla warfare.
June
Albania denied official representation at the Paris Peace Conference; British, French, and Greek negotiators later decide to divide Albania among Greece, Italy, and Yugoslavia.
