= 2023 in Albania =

- Decades: 2000s; 2010s; 2020s
- See also: Other events of 2023; List of years in Albania

Events in the year 2023 in Albania.

== Incumbents ==
- President: Bajram Begaj
- Prime Minister: Edi Rama
- Deputy Prime Minister: Belinda Balluku

== Events ==
=== January ===
- 1 January – Albtelecom and One Telecommunications finalise merger to become ONE Albania.

=== February ===
- 11-13 February – Outside the Prime Minister's Office, thousands protest against corruption and government economic policy and call for the resignation of Prime Minister Edi Rama.

=== May ===
- 14 May – 2023 Albanian local elections

=== June ===
- 20 June – Authorities raid and seize computer equipment from a camp outside Tirana which houses thousands of members of Mujahedin-e Khalq after cyberattacks against foreign governments were reportedly orchestrated from there.

=== October ===
- 21 October – Former president Sali Berisha and his son-in-law Jamarbër Malltezi are accused of corruption and money laundering taking place during Berisha's presidency, with Malltezi being arrested by police. Berisha maintains his innocence and accuses Prime Minister Edi Rama of orchestrating the charges as a political attack.

=== November ===
- 2 November – In the parliament building, members of the Democratic Party light firecrackers and stack chairs in the hallway in an attempt to prevent members of the Socialist Party from taking their seats.
- 20 November – Members of Parliament belonging to the Democratic Party, led by Sali Berisha, protest the government's 2023 budget by setting off smoke bombs and igniting a fire during the vote for its passage.

=== December ===
- 15 December – Albania returns 20 icons to North Macedonia that were trafficked a decade ago, according to Albania's Culture Ministry. A handover ceremony is held at the National History Museum in the Albanian capital, Tirana.
- 30 December – A court in Albania orders that former president and prime minister Sali Berisha be placed under house arrest following accusations of corruption.

== Sports ==
- 2022–23 Albanian Cup
- 24 September – 7 May 2023: 2022–23 Albanian Women's National Championship
