= Ali Progri =

Albanian engineer (1929–2009)

- Born: 10 October 1929; Progër, Korçë County, Albania
- Died: 24 March 2009 (aged 79); Tirana, Albania
- Education: Kiev Polytechnic Institute, Ukraine
- Known for: Classical mechanics and engineering expert
- Awards: Merited Teacher of Albania; Medal of Liberation and Memory
- Scientific career
- Fields: Mechanics, mechanical engineering technology
- Workplaces: Director in the Directory of Professional Middle Education in the Council of Ministers of Albania; Vice-Dean of the Faculty of Civil Engineering in the Polytechnic University of Tirana; Director of the Polytechnical High School of Tirana (now “Harry Fultz” High School ); CTO of the Train Factory in Tirana

Ali Progri (October 10, 1929 - March 24, 2009) was an Albanian engineer. He was a participant in World War II and afterwards was graduated in Kiev, Ukraine (then part of Soviet Union). He had a remarkable career and held various high-ranking positions during his lifetime. Ali Progri was awarded the distinguished title Merited Teacher of Albania.

== Early life and education ==
Ali Progri was born in the village of Progër in Albania, on 19 October 1929 and was the son of Muharrem Progri. He took part actively in the Albanian Resistance of World War II and after finishing his high school in Albania he went to Kiev, Ukraine in 1948 for his academic studies. In 1953 he was graduated from Kiev Polytechnic Institute, achieving high results.

== Career ==
After returning to Albania he was active in the field of engineering and was among the founders of the modern University of Tirana in 1957 (even though the first academic institute, The Pedagogical Institute of Tirana was founded on December 20, 1946) and eventually he earned the position of vice-dean of the Faculty of Civil Engineering. Thanks to his experience and intellectual profile he would be chosen as Director in the Directory of Professional Middle Education in the Council of Ministers of Albania. As a distinguished engineer and expert in the field of applied mechanics he also earned the position of the Chief Technology Officer of the Train Factory in Tirana. Nevertheless, he is most notable for his 27 years as the Principal of the Polytechnic High School of Tirana.

For his contribution in the Albanian Resistance of World War II he was awarded by the Parliament of Albania (Albanian: Kuvendi i Shqipërisë) the Medal of Liberation and Memory and for the experience and contribution in the education field, he gained the honorific title Merited Teacher of Albania. The engineer Ali Progri also held the title Professor. He died in Tirana, on 24 March 2009, at the age of 80.
