= Bardhyl Londo =

Albanian poet and writer (1948–2022)

Bardhyl Londo (1948 – 18 February 2022) was an Albanian poet and writer.

== Life and career ==
Born in Albania, Bardhyl graduated in Albanian language and Albanian literature at the University of Tirana. After graduation, he taught for several years in schools in the Përmet District, then started working as an editor in the literary magazine Drita (Light).

He made his debut as a poet with a book of poems published in 1975. He was one of the most popular lyrical poets in Albania in the 1980s. He was the author of eight poems and several novels. In 1989, he was awarded the Migjeni writers prize.

In the 1990s, he headed the Albanian Union of Writers and Artists. In 2012, Bardhyl Londo's translation from the English language of Adam Zagajewski's book of poetry, "The City Where I Would Like to Live", was published in Tirana.

In February 2022, Bardhyl was hospitalised in Tirana. He died there on 18 February, at the age of 74.

== Works ==
=== Poetry ===
- Krisma dhe trëndafila, Tirana 1975.
- Hapa në rrugë, Tirana 1981.
- Emrin e ka dashuri, Tirana 1984.
- Si ta qetësoj detin, (How to calm down the ocean), Tirana 1988
- Shën Shiu, Tirana 2010
- Jeta që na dhanë, Tirana 2013

=== Prose ===
- Uhëzime për kapërcimin e detit, Tirana 1984 (novel)
