= 2007 in Albania =

- Decades: 1980s; 1990s; 2000s; 2010s; 2020s
- See also: Other events of 2007; List of years in Albania

Events from the year 2007 in Albania.

== Incumbents ==
- President: Alfred Moisiu (until 24 July), Bamir Topi (starting 24 July)
- Prime Minister: Sali Berisha

== Events ==
=== February ===
- Top News was created by the Top Media group, the same group that owns Top Albania Radio, Top Channel and DigitAlb.

=== March ===
- March 10: Yearlong talks on the future of Kosovo end in stalemate between the Serbian Government and the ethnic Albanian leaders of the province.

=== July ===
- July 11: The Organisation for the Prohibition of Chemical Weapons confirmed the destruction of the entire chemical weapons stockpile in Albania making it the first nation to do so.
- July 24: Republic of Macedonia, Albania and of Kosovo are experiencing blackouts as a result of the 2007 European heatwave that spreads over the Balkans. It also causes bushfires everywhere in the region between Croatia, Hungary, Serbia and Greece.

=== November ===
- November 7: Four Albanian militants are killed in a Macedonian police operation.

== See also ==
- 2007 in Albanian television
