= Vito Kapo =

Albanian politician (1922–2020)

Minister of Light Industry
- In office 20 February 1987 – 7 July 1990
- Prime Minister: Adil Çarçani
- Preceded by: Esma Ulqinaku
- Succeeded by: Jovan Bardhi

Personal details
- Born: Vito Kondi; 11 September 1922 Zagori, Albania
- Died: 29 February 2020 (aged 97) Tirana, Albania
- Party: Party of Labour
- Spouse: Hysni Kapo (m. 1945; died 1979)
- Relations: Alqi Kondi (brother); Pirro Kondi (brother)
- Children: 3
- Occupation: Politician

Vito Kapo (née Kondi, 11 September 1922 – 29 February 2020) was an Albanian politician who served as Minister of the Light Industry. She was the wife of Hysni Kapo, a member of the Politburo of the Party of Labour of Albania, and a sister of the Albanian World War II hero Alqi Kondi. She was also the President of the Union of Albanian Women for nearly thirty years. Kapo was born in September 1922 in Zagori, Gjirokaster District. She died in February 2020 in Tirana at the age of 97.

In her work as President of the Union of Albanian Women, she stated that the struggle the Party of Labour of Albania was waging for the emancipation of women was a "struggle for the triumph of revolutionary ideology of the working class, and the destruction of the reactionary bourgeois and petit bourgeois ideology."
