= Esma Agolli =

Albanian actress

- Born: 1 July 1928; Tirana, Albania
- Died: 5 June 2010 (aged 81); Tirana, Albania
- Occupation: Actress
- Awards: Merited Artist

Esma Agolli (1 July 1928 – 5 June 2010) was an Albanian actress. She received the title of Merited Artist of Albania and acted in 60 different roles, her first one in 1948.

== Biography ==
Esma Agolli made her debut as a theater actress at the National Theater Tirana (Teatri Kombëtar) in 1948. In the course of her career, she played over 60 roles on stage, in the cinemas and on television.

Agolli's notable acts include as Olga in Three Sisters, Lena in Leonce and Lena and in 1960, with Mihal Popi as her partner, the title role in Mirandolina in the Albanian premiere of the play directed by Selman Vaqarit.

She officially retired from acting in 1980, but continued her appearances in theatres sporadically.

In 2005, she performed at the National Theater in Tirana in the play "Streha e të harruarve" by Ruzhdi Pulaha.

== Death ==
Agolli died of cardiac arrest.

== Filmography (selection) ==
- Ne shtepine tone (1979)
- Mysafiri (1979) – Agathia
- Përtej mureve të gurta (1979) – Zonja Neriman
- Fëmijët e saj (1957) – Nusja
- Tana (1958)
- Fletë të bardha (1990)
