= 1969 in Albania =

- Decades: 1940s; 1950s; 1960s; 1970s; 1980s
- See also: Other events of 1969; List of years in Albania

The following lists events that happened during 1969 in the People's Republic of Albania.

== Incumbents ==
- First Secretary: Enver Hoxha
- Chairman of the Presidium of the People's Assembly: Haxhi Lleshi
- Prime Minister: Mehmet Shehu

== Events ==
- 7 May — 1969 Balkans Cup: Albania defeats Romania 2-0 at Selman Stërmasi Stadium, Tirana
- 18 June — 1969 Balkans Cup: Albania is defeated by Romania 3-1 at Stadionul Ion Oblemenco (1967), Craiova
- August — 1969 Balkans Cup: Albania ties with Yugoslavia 2-2 at Stadion kraj Pirita, Bor, Serbia
- 22 October — 1969 Balkans Cup: Albania defeats Bulgaria 1-0 at Selman Stërmasi Stadium, Tirana
- 29 October — 1969 Balkans Cup: Albania is defeated by Bulgaria 3-0 at Beroe Stadium, Stara Zagora^{1}

Notes

- Note 1: Dinamo Tirana walked off when a penalty was awarded to Beroe Stara Zagora, while the score was at 1–0.
