= Hunger strike of former politically persecuted in Albania (2012) =

A hunger strike by former politically persecuted persons of Albania began on 21 September 2012 in Tirana involving 20 people persecuted during the communist years. The strike began for economic purposes, seeking the Albanian government to compensate them according to a law passed in 2007 entitling former political prisoners to 2,000 lek (11.5 euros) for each day they were in prison.

Two strikers, Gjergj Ndreca (aged 51) and Lirak Bejko (47) set fire to themselves as a sign of protest against the negligence of state structures. According to doctors, Ndreca has suffered burns to 40% of the body including in the respiratory tract, and has been sent to Greece for treatment, while Bejko has been sent to Italy. A month into the strike, strikers were still struggling to receive support from health and humanitarian organisations, and religious institutions. Of primary importance is dry blankets following heavy rain. A third man Gëzim Hamiti also immolated himself in Pogradec in a show of solidarity. Police stopped another protester, Gani Alia, from setting himself on fire.

== Timeline ==
- 30 September 2012 – EU Ambassador to Albania, Ettore Sequi advised the strikers to abandon their tactics as hunger strike is painful. That day, one of the strikers was admitted to hospital.
- 8 October 2012 – Gergj Ndreca sets himself on fire.
- 10 October 2012 – Lirak Bejko sets himself on fire. He died 3 weeks later in a hospital in Bari, Italy on November 2.
- 12 October 2012 – Albanian President Bujar Nishani met with 11 of the remaining strikers, telling them "to avoid extreme sacrifices".
- 13 October 2012 – The Albanian American Forum for Democracy organised a manifestation of solidarity in New York, in support of the hunger strikers. Former Councillor of the City of New York and friend of the "Albanian American Society" gave a speech showing solidarity with the hunger strikers and urged participants not to remain silent about their cause.
- 14 October 2012 – Eduard Kukan, head of the European Parliament Delegation said in an interview "I understand they are asking compensation for the sufferings they have endured in the prison of the communist regime. I hope that the government will attend to it and will try to resolve this situation, because when human beings are visibly suffering, it is clearly necessary to take that situation with all seriousness."
- 14 October 2012 – 81-year-old Lavdosh Beqo, a dual French/Albanian citizen, claimed "We will fast to death and will not let the sacrifice of our two friends who set themselves on fire pass in vain." On the same day, three journalists and a photographer were allowed to visit the strikers' tent. That day, 50 journalists protested in front of the Prime Minister's office, denouncing the lack of access to the strike and the government's refusal to hear the strikers' demands.
- From 15 October 2012 – eight hunger strikers remain at the original camp in Tirana, and have pledged to end their lives for their cause. In Shkodra and Elbasan efforts are under way by other ex-political prisoners to join the strike. Also on October 15, Prime Minister Berisha called those on strike "nothing but drunkards, gamblers and even criminals" as well as claiming their strike is political and guided by an ordinary criminal who once operated a brothel in Tirana, which brutally exploited women and girls. He continued in saying that "Unfortunately, this group represents only Skënder Tufa, Edi Rama, Gramoz Ruci and their benefactors (former President Bamir Topi)" Striker Vllasi Koci who was sent to hospital on 15 October due to health conditions returned to strike after saying that the ER doctors neglected him. US Ambassador Alexander Arvizu visited the strikers tent, and stated "I know that sometimes internationals can play the role of a bridge to facilitate communication. Not to serve as a mediator, but to facilitate some communication." "Of all the places where I worked, I found that Albanian politicians are bad communicators, terrible," he said.
- 16 October 2012 – Amnesty International called on the government of Albania to meet with the Association of Former Politically Persecuted Persons, and establish dialogue to promptly address their concern. Tirana Police filed a request to Tirana court declaring the hunger strike illegal, as it did not have municipal permission, and that the strikers are a threat to public safety.
- 17 October 2012 – As the hunger strike entered the 26th day, Tirana court ruled it illegal. The 7 remaining ex-political prisoners are to be removed by midnight and plan to continue elsewhere, with plans to relocate near the Embassy of the United States in Tirana.
- 19 October 2012 – Dutch Ambassador, Martin De La Beij stated the situation has "really dragged more than enough".
- 22 October 2012 – The six remaining ex-prisoners end their 31-day hunger strike, but promised to keep fighting for the compensation they request.
- 1 November 2012 – Skënder Tufa and 14 ex-political prisoners were arrested shortly before the arrival of Hillary Clinton.
- 2 November 2012 – Lirak Bejko dies in hospital in Bari. Former President Bamir Topi called Bejko 'a hero of democracy, a man persecuted and prosecuted dictatorship also in semi-democratic transition of these years". The Democratic Party of Albania openly claim that the entire protest was organized by Edi Rama's Socialist Party as a way to get more votes, adding that Rama himself provided the bottle of petrol that Bejko set himself alight with, while strike organizer Skënder Tufa claims the death was caused by Prime Minister Berisha's indifference.
