= 1968 in Albania =

- Decades: 1940s; 1950s; 1960s; 1970s; 1980s
- See also: Other events of 1968; List of years in Albania

The following lists events that happened during 1968 in the People's Republic of Albania.

== Incumbents ==
- First Secretary: Enver Hoxha
- Chairman of the Presidium of the People's Assembly: Haxhi Lleshi
- Prime Minister: Mehmet Shehu

== Events ==
- 14 February — 1967–68 Balkans Cup: Albania is defeated by Bulgaria 2-0 at Beroe Stadium, Stara Zagora
- 4 May — 1967–68 Balkans Cup: Albania defeats Turkey 1-0 at Loro Boriçi Stadium, Shkodër
- 2 June — 1967-68 Balkans Cup: Albania ties with Turkey 1-1 at Ankara 19 Mayıs Stadium, Ankara
- 12 June — 1967–68 Balkans Cup: Albania defeats Romania 2-1 at Loro Boriçi Stadium, Shkodër
- 29 June — 1967–68 Balkans Cup: Albania is defeated by Romania 2-1 at Stadionul Farul, Constanța
