= Albanian Wikipedia =

Albanian-language edition of Wikipedia

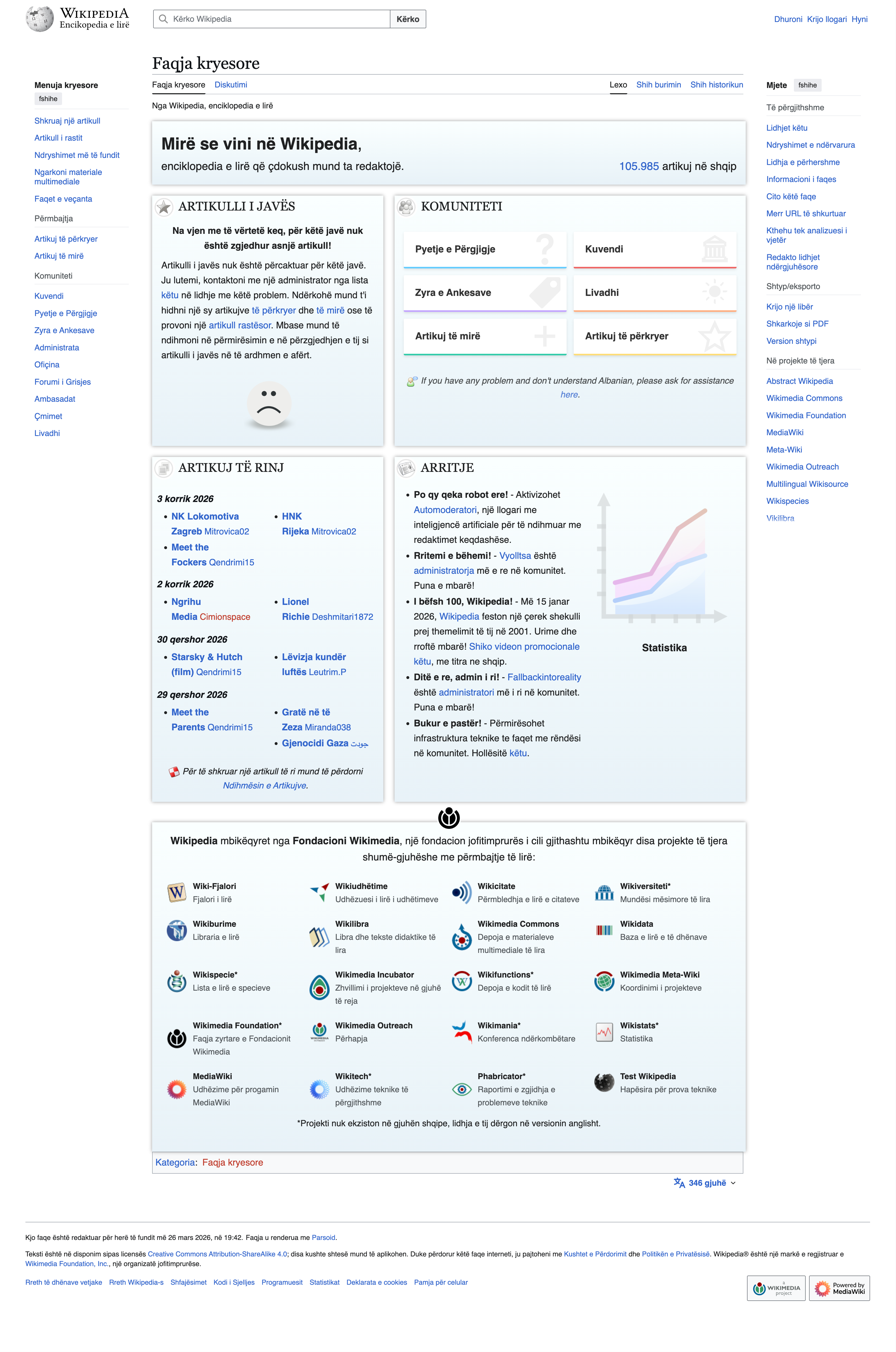
- Screenshot Main Page of the Albanian Wikipedia in July 2026
- Website type: Internet encyclopedia project
- Available in: Albanian
- Headquarters: Miami, Florida
- Owner: Wikimedia Foundation
- Website: sq.wikipedia.org
- Commercial: No
- Registration: Optional
- Launched: 12 October 2003; 22 years ago
- Content license: Creative Commons Attribution/ Share-Alike 4.0 (most text also dual-licensed under GFDL); Media licensing varies

The Albanian Wikipedia (Albanian: Wikipedia Shqip) is the Albanian language edition of Wikipedia started on 12 October 2003. As of 19 September 2026, the Wikipedia has 106,332 articles and is the 75th-largest Wikipedia.

== Article growth ==
Date	Article	Number of articles	Articles per day
			1
12 October 2003	Faqja Kryesore	1	
			2
18 May 2005	?	1000	
			8
20 September 2005	Rrethi i Pukës	2000	
			6
11 December 2005	John Wayne	2500	
			70
30 January 2006	Will Smith	6000	
			10
30 March 2006	.qa	6500	
			10
16 April 2006	.gf	7000	
			13
23 November 2006	Suretu Fatir	10000	
			41
5 December 2006	Mushkova	10500	
			50
8 January 2007	1623 në literaturë	12000	
			125
12 January 2007	Festat Islame	12500	
			33
26 March 2007	Kate Beckinsale	14000	
			25
16 April 2007	Rojet e mjegullës	14500	
			15
17 May 2007	Opus Dei	15000	
			15
20 June 2007	Microsoft Windows	15500	
			45
2 August 2007	.zr	17000	
			13
19 April 2008	Sallatë me rrepa të kuqe	20000	
			8
19 August 2008	Arkitektura post moderne	21000	
			10
31 December 2010	Jakobi i Vjetri	30000	
			28
28 December 2011	Tërbaçi	40000	
