= 2011 in Albania =

- Decades: 1990s; 2000s; 2010s; 2020s
- See also: Other events of 2011; List of years in Albania

The following lists events from the year 2011 in Albania.

== Incumbents ==
- President: Bamir Topi
- Prime Minister: Sali Berisha
- Deputy Prime Minister: Ilir Meta

== Events ==
=== January ===
- January 21 - Over 20,000 people protest against alleged electoral fraud with 3 people being killed in clashes with police in Tirana. Deputy minister Ilir Meta resigns from his position.
- January 22 - Prime Minister Berisha declares his country will not experience a Tunisian-style uprising in response to the protests.
- January 23 - Arrest warrants are issued for six members of the republican guard over the deaths of three protesters during the unrest.
- January 25 - Opposition leader Edi Rama calls for more protests in the country and demands the international community mediate the political crisis.
- January 28 - Over 100,000 supporters of the Socialist Party of Albania, the opposition, mourn the deaths of three protesters during police clashes in anti-government protests, through a two-hour calm procession.

=== March ===
March 30- 3.4 Earthquake in Gjrokastra

=== November ===
November 30: Death of Leka, Crown Prince of Albania, in Tirana.
