= Ilir Rusmali =

Albanian politician

Member of Parliament
- Constituency: Tirana

Personal details
- Born: Ilirjan Rusmali; April 24, 1965 (age 61) Elbasan, People's Socialist Republic of Albania
- Party: Democratic Party (DP)

Ilir Rusmali (born 24 April 1965) is an Albanian politician previously affiliated with the Democratic Party of Albania (DP). He represented the Tirana region in the Albanian Parliament and was a member of the DP parliamentary group.

== Education ==
Rusmali graduated from the Faculty of Law, University of Tirana (1983–1987). He pursued post-graduate studies in Constitutional Law, Human Rights and International Public Law at the Max Planck Institute for Comparative Public Law and International Law, University of Heidelberg (1992–1994).

== Political career ==
- Legal Assistant to the Prime Minister (1995–1996)
- Legal Adviser to the President of the Republic (1996–1997)
- DP Secretary for Elections and Legal Affairs (1996–2005)
- Deputy Prime Minister (2005–2007)
- Minister of Justice (2007)
- Member of the Committee on Government Securities (1996–2000)
- Member of the Office for Protection of Citizens (2001)
- Member of the Tirana Municipal Council and Chair of the DP group (2000–2005)
- Elected member of the DP National Council and the DP Chairmanship (2005)
- MP in legislatures XVII and XVIII (2005–2013)
