= 1977 in Albania =

- Decades: 1950s; 1960s; 1970s; 1980s; 1990s
- See also: Other events of 1977; List of years in Albania

The following lists events that happened during 1977 in the People's Republic of Albania.

== Incumbents ==
- First Secretary: Enver Hoxha
- Chairman of the Presidium of the People's Assembly: Haxhi Lleshi
- Prime Minister: Mehmet Shehu

== Events ==
- 17 April - 1977 Balkans Cup: Albania ties with Greece 1-1 at Vojo Kushi Stadium, Shkodër
- 27 April - 1977 Balkans Cup: Albania ties with Yugoslavia 1-1 at Vojo Kushi Stadium, Shkodër
- 4 May - 1977 Balkans Cup: Albania is defeated by Yugoslavia 2-0 at Pod Goricom Stadium, Titograd
- 26 May - 1977 Balkans Cup: Albania is defeated by Greece 3-0 at Leoforos Alexandras Stadium, Athens
- 19 October - 1977–78 Balkans Cup: Albania is defeated by Greece 2-0 at Aris Stadium, Thessaloniki
- 23 November - 1977-78 Balkans Cup: Albania is defeated by Yugoslavia 6-0 at Stadion Kantrida, Rijeka
- 21 December - 1977-78 Balkans Cup: Albania defeats Yugoslavia 1-0 at Skënderbeu Stadium, Korçë
