= 1978 in Albania =

- Decades: 1950s; 1960s; 1970s; 1980s; 1990s
- See also: Other events of 1978; List of years in Albania

The following lists events that happened during 1978 in the People's Republic of Albania.

== Incumbents ==
- First Secretary: Enver Hoxha
- Chairman of the Presidium of the People's Assembly: Haxhi Lleshi
- Prime Minister: Mehmet Shehu

== Events ==
- 1 March - 1977–78 Balkans Cup: Albania defeats Greece 2-0 at Skënderbeu Stadium, Korçë
- 12 November - 1978 Albanian parliamentary election
