= 1975 in Albania =

- Decades: 1950s; 1960s; 1970s; 1980s; 1990s
- See also: Other events of 1975; List of years in Albania

The following lists events that happened during 1975 in the People's Republic of Albania.

== Incumbents ==
- First Secretary: Enver Hoxha
- Chairman of the Presidium of the People's Assembly: Haxhi Lleshi
- Prime Minister: Mehmet Shehu

== Events ==
- 2 April - 1975 Balkans Cup: Albania is defeated by Greece 2-1 at Nea Smyrni Stadium, Athens
- 9 April - 1975 Balkans Cup: Albania ties with Yugoslavia at Dinamo Stadium, Tirana
- 29 May - 1975 Balkans Cup: Albania is defeated by Yugoslavia 3-0 at Čair Stadium, Niš
- 15 June - 1975 Balkans Cup: Albania defeats Greece 6-0 at Dinamo Stadium, Tirana
