= 1962 in Albania =

- Decades: 1940s; 1950s; 1960s; 1970s; 1980s
- See also: Other events of 1962; List of years in Albania

The following lists events that happened during 1962 in the People's Republic of Albania.

== Incumbents ==
- First Secretary: Enver Hoxha
- Chairman of the Presidium of the People's Assembly: Haxhi Lleshi
- Prime Minister: Mehmet Shehu

== Events ==
- 11 March - 1961-63 Balkans Cup: Albania defeats Romania 3-2 at Dinamo, Bucharest
- 22 March - 1961-63 Balkans Cup: Albania ties with Bulgaria 2-2 at Stadion Georgi Asparuhov, Sofia
- 25 March - 1961-63 Balkans Cup: Albania is defeated by Turkey 1-0 at Şükrü Saracoğlu, Istanbul
- 3 June - 1962 Albanian parliamentary election
- 21 June - 1961-63 Balkans Cup: Albania ties with Bulgaria 0-0 at Selman Stërmasi Stadium, Tirana
- 3 November - 1961-63 Balkans Cup: Albania defeats Turkey 3-2 at Selman Stërmasi Stadium, Tirana
