= 1974 in Albania =

- Decades: 1950s; 1960s; 1970s; 1980s; 1990s
- See also: Other events of 1974; List of years in Albania

The following lists events that happened during 1974 in the People's Republic of Albania.

== Incumbents ==
- First Secretary: Enver Hoxha
- Chairman of the Presidium of the People's Assembly: Haxhi Lleshi
- Prime Minister: Mehmet Shehu

== Events ==
- 6 March - 1974 Balkans Cup: Albania defeats Yugoslavia 2-1 at Dinamo Stadium, Tirana
- 10 March - 1973–74 Albanian Cup: FK Dinamo Tirana defeats FK Partizani Tirana 1-0 at Qemal Stafa Stadium, Tirana
- 10 April - 1974 Balkans Cup: Albania is defeated by Greece 3-1 at Alcazar Stadium, Larissa
- 18 May - 1974 Balkans Cup: Albania is defeated by Yugoslavia 2-0 at Gradski Arena, Skopje
- 29 May - 1974 Balkans Cup: Albania ties with Greece 2-2 at Dinamo Stadium, Tirana
- 6 October - 1974 Albanian parliamentary election
