= 1970 in Albania =

- Decades: 1950s; 1960s; 1970s; 1980s; 1990s
- See also: Other events of 1970; List of years in Albania

The following lists events that happened during 1970 in the People's Republic of Albania.

== Incumbents ==
- First Secretary: Enver Hoxha
- Chairman of the Presidium of the People's Assembly: Haxhi Lleshi
- Prime Minister: Mehmet Shehu

== Events ==
- 8 March – 1969–70 Albanian Cup: FK Partizani Tirana vs KF Vllaznia, Partizani wins 4-0
- 15 March – 1969–70 Albanian Cup: Partizani vs Villaznia, Villaznia wins 1-0
- 15 April – 1970 Balkans Cup: Albania ties with Yugoslavia 1-1
- 6 May – 1970 Balkans Cup: Albania defeats Romania 1-0
- 27 May – 1970 Balkans Cup: Albania defeats Romania 1-0
- 1 July – 1970 Balkans Cup: Albania is defeated by Yugoslavia 1-2
- 9 August – 1970 Balkans Cup: Albania ties with Bulgaria 1-1
- 16 August – 1970 Balkans Cup: Albania defeats Bulgaria 3-0
- 20 September – 1970 Albanian parliamentary election
- 14 October - UEFA Euro 1972 qualifying: Albania loses against Poland 0-3 at Stadion Śląski, Chorzów
- 13 December - UEFA Euro 1972 qualifying: Albania loses against Turkey 1-2 at Mithatpaşa Stadium, Istanbul
