= 1961 in Albania =

- Decades: 1940s; 1950s; 1960s; 1970s; 1980s
- See also: Other events of 1961; List of years in Albania

The following lists events that happened during 1961 in the People's Republic of Albania.

== Incumbents ==
- First Secretary: Enver Hoxha
- Chairman of the Presidium of the People's Assembly: Haxhi Lleshi
- Prime Minister: Mehmet Shehu

== Events ==
- 9 March - 1960-61 Balkans Cup: Albania is defeated 1-0 by Romania at Tractorul, Brașov
- 29 March - 1960-61 Balkans Cup: Albania defeats Bulgaria 2-0 at Selman Stërmasi Stadium, Tirana
- 20 August - 1960-61 Balkans Cup: Albania is defeated 1-0 by Turkey at Şükrü Saracoğlu, Istanbul
- 4 September - establishment of the Naval Academy
- 30 September - 1960-61 Balkans Cup: Albania ties with Turkey 0-0 at Selman Stërmasi Stadium, Tirana
- 12 October - 1960-61 Balkans Cup: Albania is defeated 4-0 by Bulgaria at Stadion Georgi Asparuhov, Sofia
- 5 November - 1960-61 Balkans Cup: Albania ties with Romania 0-0 at Selman Stërmasi Stadium, Tirana
- 4 December - 1961-63 Balkans Cup: Albania ties with Romania 1-1 at Selman Stërmasi Stadium, Tirana
