= 1966 in Albania =

- Decades: 1940s; 1950s; 1960s; 1970s; 1980s
- See also: Other events of 1966; List of years in Albania

The following lists events that happened during 1966 in the People's Republic of Albania.

== Incumbents ==
- First Secretary: Enver Hoxha
- Chairman of the Presidium of the People's Assembly: Haxhi Lleshi
- Prime Minister: Mehmet Shehu

== Events ==
- 19 May - 1964–66 Balkans Cup: Albania is defeated by Romania 1-2 at Selman Stërmasi Stadium, Tirana
- 1 June - 1966–67 Balkans Cup: Albania defeats Bulgaria 2-0 at Qemal Stafa Stadium, Tirana
- 29 June - 1966-67 Balkans Cup: Albania is defeated by Bulgaria 3-1 at Yuri Gagarin Stadium, Varna, Bulgaria
- 4 July - 1966-67 Balkans Cup: Albania defeats Romania 1-2 at Francisc von Neuman Stadium, Arad, Romania
- 10 July - 1966 Albanian parliamentary election
- 3 December - 1966-67 Balkans Cup: Albania defeats Romania 2-0 at Selman Stërmasi Stadium, Tirana
