= Niko Peleshi =

Albanian politician (born 1970)

Niko Peleshi MP
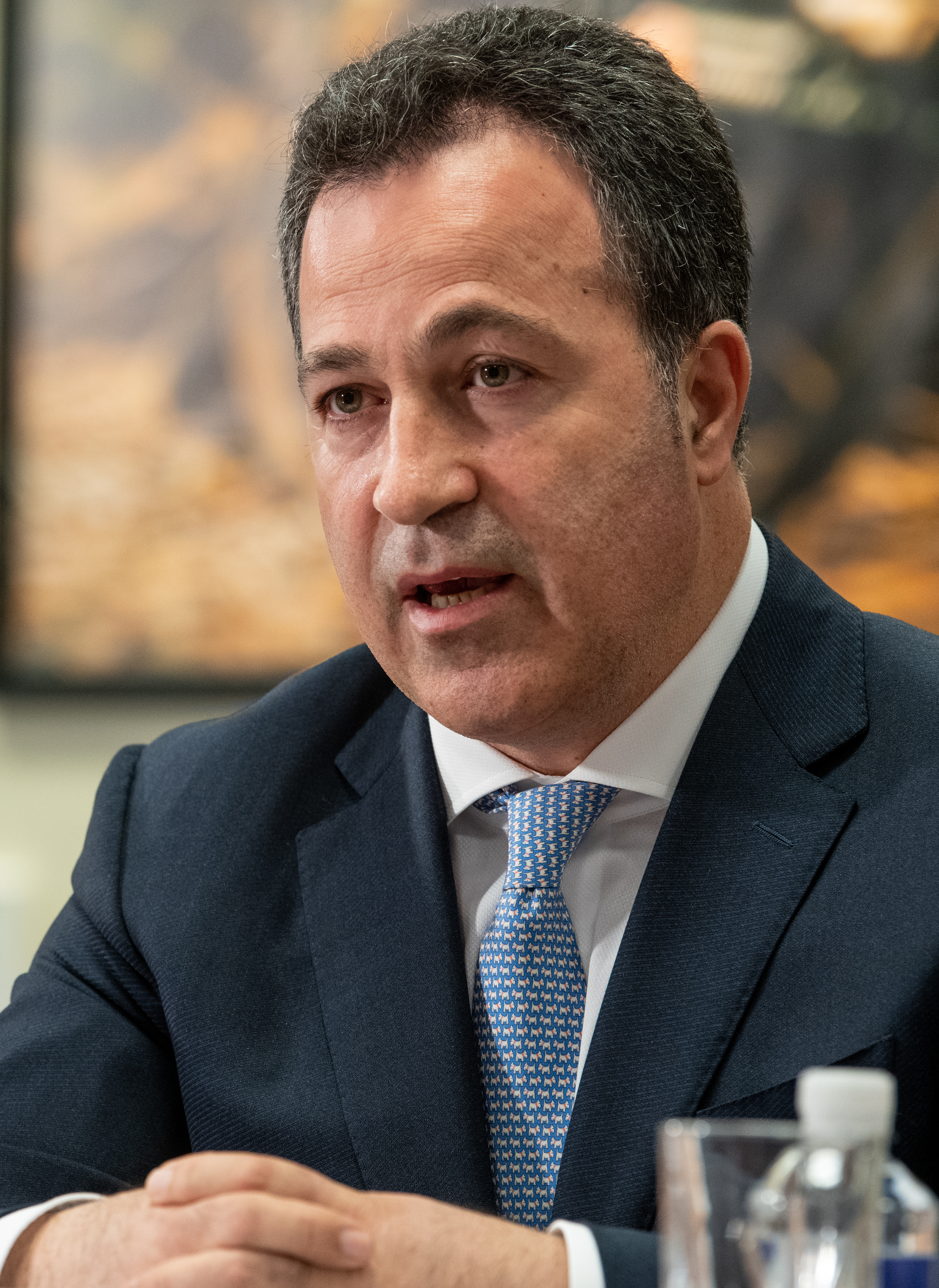
- Peleshi in 2023

Speaker of the Parliament of Albania
- Incumbent
- Assumed office 12 September 2025
- President: Bajram Begaj
- Prime Minister: Edi Rama
- Preceded by: Elisa Spiropali

Member of the Albanian Parliament for Korça
- Incumbent
- Assumed office 25 June 2017

35th Defence Minister of Albania
- In office 4 January 2021 – 30 July 2024
- President: Ilir Meta; Bajram Begaj
- Prime Minister: Edi Rama
- Preceded by: Olta Xhaçka
- Succeeded by: Pirro Vengu

Minister of Agriculture and Rural Development
- In office 13 September 2017 – 5 January 2019
- Prime Minister: Edi Rama
- Preceded by: Edmond Panariti
- Succeeded by: Bledi Çuçi

Deputy Prime Minister of Albania
- In office 15 September 2013 – 22 May 2017
- Prime Minister: Edi Rama
- Preceded by: Myqerem Tafaj
- Succeeded by: Ledina Mandia

Mayor of Korçë
- In office 18 February 2007 – 15 September 2013
- Prime Minister: Sali Berisha
- Preceded by: Robert Damo
- Succeeded by: Sotiraq Filo

Personal details
- Born: 11 November 1970 (age 55) Korçë, PR Albania
- Party: Socialist
- Education: Polytechnic University of Tirana

Niko Aleks Peleshi (born 11 November 1970) is an Albanian politician who has been serving as the Speaker of the Parliament of Albania since September 2025. He previously served as the Minister of Defence from December 2020 to September 2025, and as the Deputy Prime Minister of Albania in September 2013. He was Prefect of Korçë from 2004 to 2005 and Mayor of Korçë from 2007 to 2012. Since 2012 he has been a member of the Presidency of the Socialist Party. He's been an official deputy since 2019.

== Biography ==
He is married to Amarda Peleshi and has three children.

He graduated with honours in Electronic Engineering from the Polytechnic University of Tirana and was awarded the title of Electronic Engineer. In 1989 he completed secondary education with honors in Korçë, at Raqi Qirinxhi High School.

Peleshi worked for several years in the private business sector in the city of Korçë and was head of the Korçë Chamber of Commerce and Industry from 2001 to 2004.

His political career started in October 2004 when he was appointed Prefect of Korça Region. He stayed in office for one year. In 2005 he was elected Chair of Korçë Socialist Party Branch. In the local elections of February 2007 he was elected Mayor of Korçë, to be reconfirmed in this office in the 2011 local elections. He is a member of the Socialist Party Chairmanship since 2012.

In 2013 he became a full of the Monitoring Committee of the Congress of Local and Regional Authorities of the Council of Europe.

He is proficient in English and German.
