= 2019 in Albania =

Events in Albania in 2019

Flag of Albania

Events from the year 2019 in Albania.

== Incumbents ==
- President: Ilir Meta
- Prime Minister: Edi Rama
- Deputy Prime Minister: Senida Mesi (until 17 January); Erion Braçe (from 17 January)

== Events ==
=== May ===
- 10–14 May – Albania competed in the Eurovision Song Contest 2019 with Jonida Maliqi's song Ktheju tokës.

=== June ===
- 30 June – Local Elections

=== November ===
- 26 November – A 6.4-magnitude earthquake struck Albania, killing 51.
