= List of Albanian painters =

Following is a list of notable Albanian painters.

== Classical ==
- Michele Greco da Valona (15-16th century)
- Onufri (16th century)
- Francesco Albani (1578–1660)
- Kostandin Shpataraku (1736–1767)
- David Selenica (18th Century)
- Marco Basaiti (1470–1530)
- Andrea Aleksi (1425–1505)
- Zografi Brothers (18th century)

== Modern ==
- Mustafa Arapi (1950–2021)
- Lumturi Blloshmi (1944–2020)
- Xhovalin Delia (born 1959)
- Parid Dule (born 1969)
- Helidon Gjergji (born 1970)
- Ervin Hatibi (born 1974)
- Fatmir Haxhiu (1927–2001)
- Kolë Idromeno (1860–1939)
- Sadik Kaceli (1912–2000)
- Ibrahim Kodra (1918–2006)
- Zef Kolombi (1907–1949)
- Abidin Dino (1913–1993)
- Andrea Kushi (1884–1959)
- Gazmend Leka (born 1953)
- Gentian Lulani (born 1972)
- Ndoc Martini (1880–1916)
- Agathangjel Mbrica (1883–1957)
- Vangjush Mio (1891–1957)
- Genc Mulliqi (born 1966)
- Fatmir Musaj (born 1958)
- George Pali (born 1957)
- Edi Rama (born 1964)
- Chatin Sarachi (1899–1974)
- Zef Shoshi (born 1939)
- Saimir Strati (born 1966)
- Eltjon Valle (born 1984)
- Shaqir Veseli (born 1957)
- Ilia Xhokaxhi (1948–2007)
- Agim Zajmi (1936–2013)
- Agim Kadillari (born 1953)
- Qemal Butka (1907–1997)
- Musa Qarri (born 1953)
- Nexhmedin Zajmi (1916–1991)
- Miranda Kalefi (born 1963)
- Ilir Jaçellari (born 1970)
- Spiro Xega (1861–1953)
- Agim Sulaj (born 1960)
- Arthur Tashko (1901–1994)
- Lui Shtini (born 1978)
- Engjëll Berisha (1926–2010)
- Masar Caka (1946–2000)
- Tahir Emra (1938–2024)
- Abdullah Gërguri (1931–1994)
- Nimon Lokaj (born 1941)
- Ramadan Ramadani (1944–2005)
- Esat Valla (born 1944)
- Muslim Mulliqi (1934–1998)
- Abdurrahim Buza (1905–1987)
- Omer Kaleshi (1932–2022)
- Sadri Ahmeti (1939–2010)
- Maks Velo (1935–2020)

== See also ==
- Albanian art
- List of Albanians
