= Fatmir =

Fatmir is an Albanian masculine given name, a compound of the Albanian fat(e) (luck) from the Latin “fati” and mirë (good) also from the Latin “mirus/mirum”. Notable people with the name include:

- Fatmir Agalliu (1933–1998), Albanian academic
- Fatmir Besimi (born 1975), Macedonian politician and economist of Albanian ethnicity
- Fatmir Bushi (born 1963), Albanian weightlifter
- Fatmir Caca (born 1985), Albanian football defender
- Fatmir Dalladaku (born 1953), German cardiac surgeon of Albanian origin
- Fatmir Doga (born 1967), Albanian actor
- Fatmir Efica (born 1961), Albanian sports journalist and radio commentator
- Fatmir Frashëri (1941–2019), Albanian football player
- Fatmir Gjata (1922–1989), Albanian writer
- Fatmir Gjeka (born 1975), Montenegrin politician
- Fatmir Hasani (born 1957), Serbian politician
- Fatmir Hasanpapa (born 1965), Albanian retired footballer
- Fatmir Haxhiu (1927–2001), Albanian painter
- Fatmir Hima (born 1954), Albanian footballer
- Fatmir Hysenbelliu (born 1992), Albanian football midfielder
- Fatmir Limaj (born 1971), politician from Kosovo
- Fatmir Mediu (born 1967), Albanian politician
- Fatmir Musaj (born 1958), Albanian painter
- John (Pelushi) (Fatmir Pelushi born 1956), Archbishop of Albania
- Fatmir Prengaj (born 2001), Albanian footballer
- Fatmir Sejdiu (born 1951), politician from Kosovo
- Fatmir Toçi (born 1958), Albanian publisher
- Fatmir Vata (born 1971), Albanian football player
- Fatmir Xhafaj (born 1959), Albanian politician
