= List of Albanian sculptors =

This is a list of Albanian sculptors.

== Sculptors ==
- Kolë Idromeno (1860–1939)
- Murad Toptani (1867–1918)
- Odhise Paskali (1903–1985)
- Dhimitër Çani (1904–1990)
- Janaq Paço (1914–1991)
- Sadik Kaceli (1914–2000)
- Kristina Koljaka (1915–2005)
- Nexhmedin Zajmi (1916–1991)
- Kristaq Rama (1932–1998)
- Agim Çavdarbasha (1944–1999)
- Agim Rada (1953–2023)
- Vasiliev Nini (born 1954)
- Saimir Strati (born 1966)
- Helidon Xhixha (born 1970)
- Genc Mulliqi (born 1966)
- Ardian Pepa (born 1977)
