= Agim =

Agim is a masculine given name and surname of Albanian origin. It means "dawn" in Albanian. Notable people with the name include:

== Given name ==
- Agim Ademi (born 1961), Kosovar footballer and administrator
- Agim Ajdarević (born 1969), Yugoslav footballer
- Agim Bahtiri (born 1960), Kosovar politician and entrepreneur
- Agim Bubeqi (1963–2026), Albanian footballer
- Agim Cana (born 1956), Kosovar footballer
- Agim Canaj (born 1962), Albanian footballer and coach
- Agim Çavdarbasha (1944–1999), Albanian sculptor
- Agim Çeku (born 1960), Kosovar military commander and politician
- Agim Çelaj (1961–1998), Kosovar Army commander
- Agim Dajçi (born 2000), Albanian footballer
- Agim Hajrizi (1961–1999), Kosovar human rights activist
- Agim Hushi (born 1967), Albanian-Australian singer
- Agim Ibraimi (born 1988), Macedonian footballer
- Agim Kaba (born 1980), Albanian-American actor, artist, and filmmaker
- Agim Kadillari (born 1953), Albanian painter
- Agim Krajka (1937–2021), Albanian composer
- Agim Krasniqi (born 1951), Macedonian insurgent leader
- Agim Krasniqi (politician), Kosovar economist, civil servant, and politician
- Agim Meto (born 1986), Albanian footballer
- Agim Murati (1953–2005), Albanian footballer
- Agim Nesho (born 1956), Albanian diplomat
- Agim Nikolić (born 1958), Bosnian football manager
- Agim Nuhiu (born 1977), Macedonian politician, former Interior Minister
- Agim Qirjaqi (1950–2010), Albanian actor and television director
- Agim Rada (1953–2023), Albanian sculptor
- Agim Ramadani (1963–1999), Albanian Army commander and writer
- Agim Shabani (born 1988), Norwegian footballer
- Agim Shala (1975–1998), Kosovar Army commander
- Agim Shuke (1942–1992), Albanian film and stage actor
- Agim Sopi (born 1969), Macedonian football coach and manager
- Agim Sulaj (born 1960), Albanian painter
- Agim Zajmi (1936–2013), Albanian painter
- Agim Zeka (born 1998), Albanian footballer

== Surname ==
- Akomaye Agim (born 1960), Nigerian jurist
- McTelvin Agim (born 1997), American football player
