= Qemal Stafa High School =

School in Tirana, Albania

Coordinates: 41.3326°N 19.8065°E

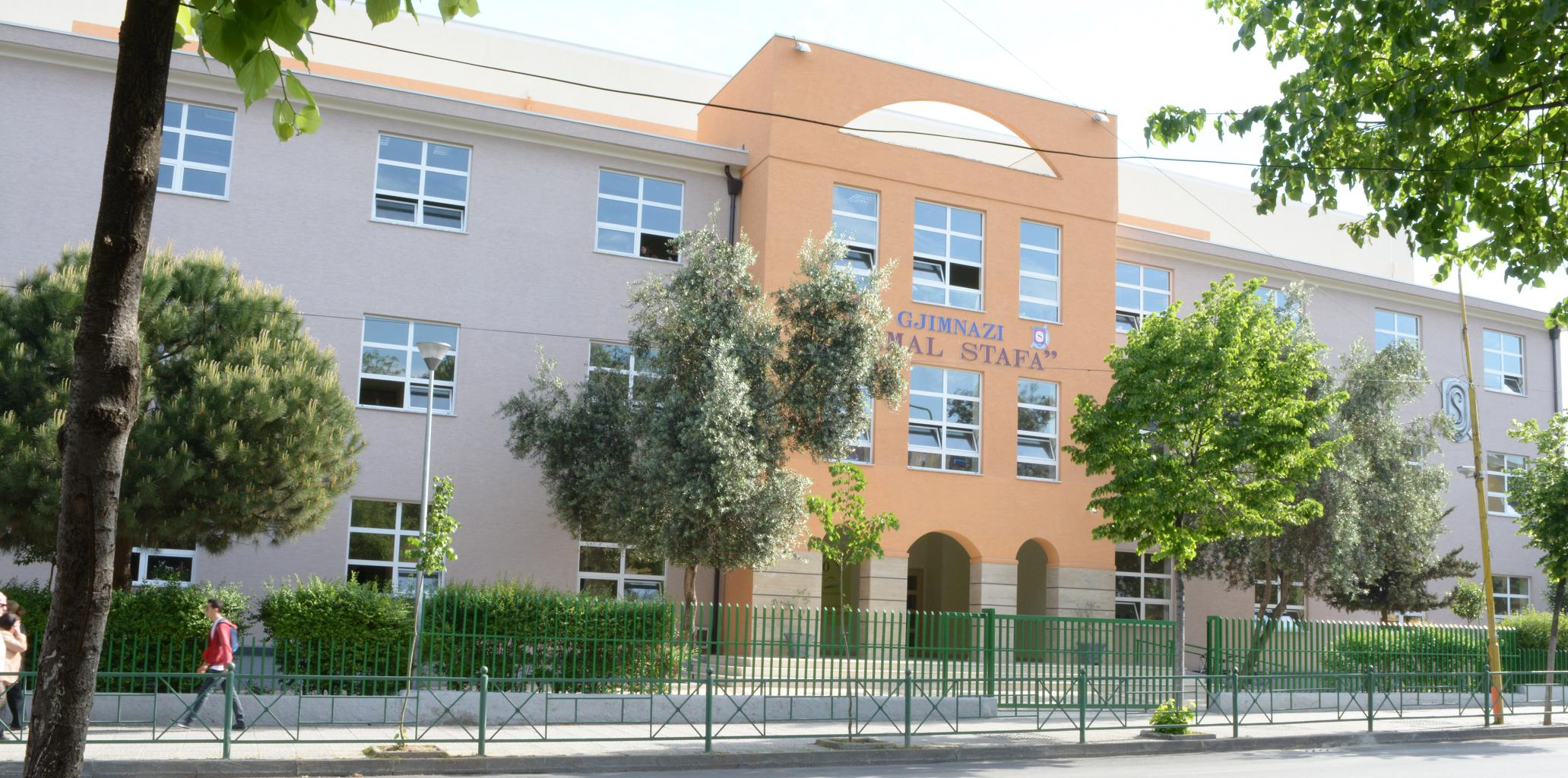
Facade

The Qemal Stafa High School is a high school located in Tirana, Albania.

Founded in 1925 by Prime Minister Ahmet Zogu as the Lyceum of Tirana, it is notable for its alumni, seventy-five of whom died in World War II, and fourteen of whom were awarded the title of People's Hero of Albania during World War II.

== Notable alumni ==
=== Recipients of the title Hero of Albania ===
- Qemal Stafa
- Vasil Shanto
- Ali Demi
- Margarita Tutulani
- Asim Zeneli

=== Science personalities ===
- Neritan Ceka

=== In literature ===
- Jakov Xoxa
- Dionis Bubani
- Petro Zheji
- Teodor Keko
- Gjergj Zheji
- Fatos Kongoli

=== In sports ===
- Skënder Begeja
- Besim Fagu
- Zihni Gjinali
- Rexhep Spahiu
- Petrit Dibra
- Klodeta Gjini
- Sulejman Demollari
- Igli Tare

=== Recipients of People's Artist of Albania title ===
- Naim Frashëri (actor)
- Sandër Prosi
- Pirro Mani
- Vaçe Zela
- Violeta Manushi
- Robert Ndrenika
- Janaq Paço

=== Recipients of Merited Artist of Albania title ===
- Ndriçim Xhepa
- Hysen Hakani

=== Recipients of the Merited Painter of Albania and People's Painter of Albania titles ===
- Andrea Kushi
- Abdurrahim Buza
- Fatmir Haxhiu
- Nexhmedin Zajmi
- Maks Velo
