= Gentian (disambiguation) =

A gentian is a plant that has terminal tubular flowers.

Gentian may also refer to:

== Ships ==
- HMS Gentian (K90), a Royal Navy Flower-class corvette
- USCGC Gentian (WIX-290), a Cactus-class seagoing buoy tender

== People ==
- Gentian (given name)
- Saint Gentian (died 287), French Christian martyr

== Other uses ==
- Gentian violet, a dye and antifungal agent
- Gentian liqueur, a distilled alcoholic beverage
- Gentian, Michigan, a community in the US

== See also ==
- Tulip gentian, Eustoma, a herbaceous annual
- Dwarf gentian, Gentianella
- Gentium (disambiguation)
