= Zajmi =

Zajmi is an Albanian surname. Notable people with the surname include:

- Agim Zajmi (1936–2013), Albanian painter
- Luana Zajmi (born 2002), Slovenian footballer
- Nexhmedin Zajmi (1916–1991), Albanian painter and sculptor
- Roland Zajmi (born 1973), Albanian football player

== See also ==
- Sipahi
