= Mustafa Arapi =

Albanian painter

- Born: July 23, 1950; Tiranë, Albania
- Died: January 22, 2021; Tiranë, Albania
- Education: Academy of Arts
- Known for: Painting, conservation, restoration

Mustafa Arapi was an Albanian painter, lecturer and art restorer.

He was awarded with the Grand Master Order by the President of the Republic post-mortem in April 2021.

== Education and career ==
Mustafa Arapi was born on 23 July 1950 in Tiranë, Albania with his family roots from Arapaj, a village in Durrës which explains his surname. He graduated from the Academy of Arts in 1979 with a degree in Fine Arts.

After graduating from the Art Academy under the guidance of the Albanian Sculptor Kristaq Rama, he was assigned in the Institute of the Cultural Monuments in Tirana. His work made possible the restoration of many religious icons, frescos, paintings, iconostasis and mural paintings in different churches including the St. Nicholas Church in Shelcan, the Churches of Saint Michael and Saint Peter in Vithkuq, Holy Resurrection Church in Mborje, St. Nicholas' Church, Perondi in Berat, the 18th-century Church of St. Athanasius in Karavasta, St. George's Monastery in Sarandë, etc. Mustafa Arapi brought to light hundreds of square meters of frescoes and many of the Onufri icons are restored by him.

He worked as a Professor at the Academy of Arts from 1985 until 1991. Then, during 1993–2006 he was Chief of the Department of the Works of Art in the Institute of the Cultural Monuments. He held several other academic and professional positions in the field of art restoration, including professorships at the American University of Tirana and the Institute of Restoration of the Albanian Orthodox Church. He also served on the National Council of Restoration, the Scientific Council of Restoration, and was a member of ICOMOS Albania.

Mustafa Arapi was also a member of the High Commission of the Albanian postal stamp until 2006 and also member of the Scientific Counsel of Restoration and the National Counsel of Restoration of Albania.

== Accomplishments ==
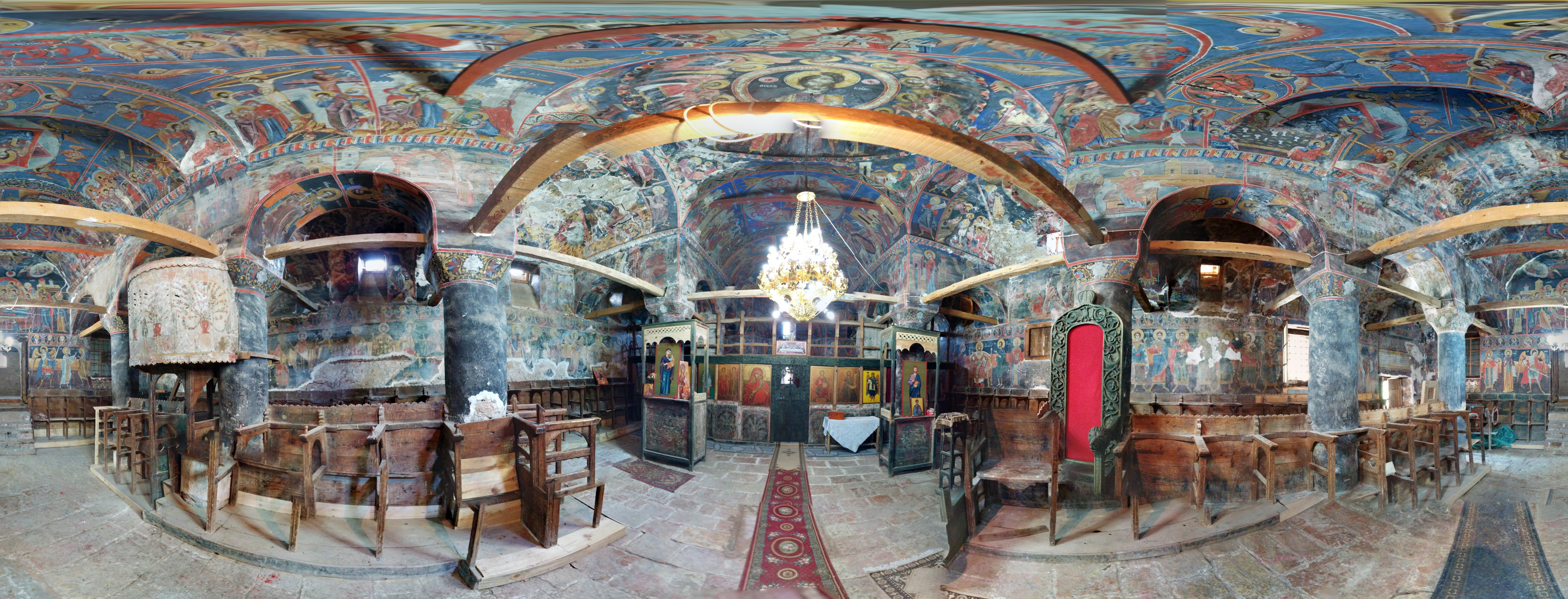
Panorama of Interior of the Church of Saint Michael which was restored by Arapi

Arapi has held more than 20 personal art exhibitions all over the world and has also participated in the International Biennale of Ankara in 1985 and Alexandria in 1987.

He has been honored by the Albanian Parliament with the “Naim Frasheri Order” in 1989 for high level of artistic performance and has also won the First Honorary Prize in the 2nd International Biennal Raciborz in Poland, first Prize in the Onufri International contest in Tirana, Honorary Award at the Third International exhibition contemporary arts World Concept in Budapest etc.

In 2019, he concluded the restoration of the paintings of the Catholic Cathedral in Prizren. The project had been approved by the Ministry of Culture of Kosovo two years earlier and was documented in detail in a 170-page report. The restoration lasted a year and a half and was successfully completed.

He also wrote numerous scientific and artistic articles in many national and international magazines. The articles published in the magazine Monumentet are especially remembered.

== See also ==
- List of Albanian painters
