= Agalliu =

Agalliu is an Albanian surname. Notable people with the surname include:

- Fatmir Agalliu, (1933–1998) Albanian scholar and writer
- Neriada Agalliu Zenuni, (born 1976), Albanian basketball player, relative of Fatmir
- Roland Agalliu (born 1961), Albanian football player
