= Artur Zheji =

Albanian journalist and television host (1961–2025)

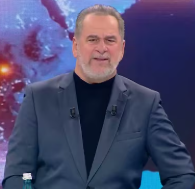
- Artur Zheji on 360 Gradë.
- Born: 29 August 1961; Tirana, Albania
- Died: 23 August 2025 (aged 63); Sarandë, Albania
- Occupations: Journalist; television presenter
- Children: 3
- Parents: Petro Zheji (father); Besa Imami (mother)

Artur Zheji (29 August 1961 – 23 August 2025) was an Albanian journalist, publicist and television host. Over a career spanning several decades, he emerged as one of the most prominent figures in Albanian media, working as a political analyst, journalist, and lecturer, and holding senior editorial positions in major outlets, including Radio Televizioni Shqiptar, where he served as General Director from 2002 to 2006.

== Early life and education ==
Zheji was born on 29 August 1961 in Tirana, the son of academic Petro Zheji and actress Besa Imami. He is the nephew of academic Gjergj Zheji.

Zheji studied directing at the University of Tirana and began his career as a playwright at the People’s Theater in Tirana.

== Career ==
Zheji worked in journalism and public commentary for several decades, emerging as one of the most prominent figures in Albanian media after the 1990s. In 1994, he was a correspondent in Rome for the Kosovo weekly KOHA Javore. He also spent several years with the Italian broadcaster Radio Radicale, covering Balkan affairs. Zheji returned to Albania during the Kosovo War, hosting the program Luftë apo Paqe në Kosovë ("War or Peace in Kosovo"), which gained wide viewership.

Zheji served as General Director of Radio Televizioni Shqiptar (RTSH) from 2002 to 2006 and was director of the newspaper MAPO.

Zheji was known for his political and cultural analyses, noted for their distinctive perspective and direct style. He became widely known to the public as the host of the political talk show 360 Gradë, which aired on Ora News and ABC News Albania, running from 2017 until his death in 2025.

== Death ==
On 23 August 2025, six days before his 64th birthday, Zheji died suddenly in Sarandë while vacationing with his family. According to reports, he suffered a cardiac arrest while dining with his wife and son at a restaurant. He was transported by ambulance to a hospital but was pronounced dead on arrival.

== Legacy ==
Following his death, former president Bamir Topi described Zheji as open-minded and respectful in debate, noting that his work often went beyond politics to questions concerning state institutions and national interests. Panorama characterized him as "one of the most prominent figures in media and public opinion in Albania," citing his long career as a journalist, analyst, lecturer, and media executive, as well as his contributions to academic life and literary translation.

A memorial ceremony was held at the University of Fine Arts in Tirana, where Zheji had studied directing. Prime Minister Edi Rama sent a wreath of flowers, while tributes described Zheji as an influential voice in Albanian journalism and public life. MP Arben Pëllumbi referred to him as "a figure of free thought," while MP Blendi Gonxhja emphasized Zheji's “creative side.” Former prime minister Sali Berisha called him "a special and respectable voice in analysis," and presidential adviser and journalist Tedi Blushi described him as "a patriot in defense of media freedom." Artist Timo Flloko praised him as "a rare artistic and erudite soul."

Former foreign minister Paskal Milo highlighted Zheji's role in "defending the national cause and Kosovo." Kosovo President Vjosa Osmani praised his role in documenting Serbian crimes in Kosovo, while calling him "one of the boldest voices of free thought in the Albanian-speaking world" and “a voice of truth and a defender of human dignity."
