= Albanians in Bosnia and Herzegovina =

Bosnians of partial or full Albanian ancestry

Albanians of Bosnia and Herzegovina
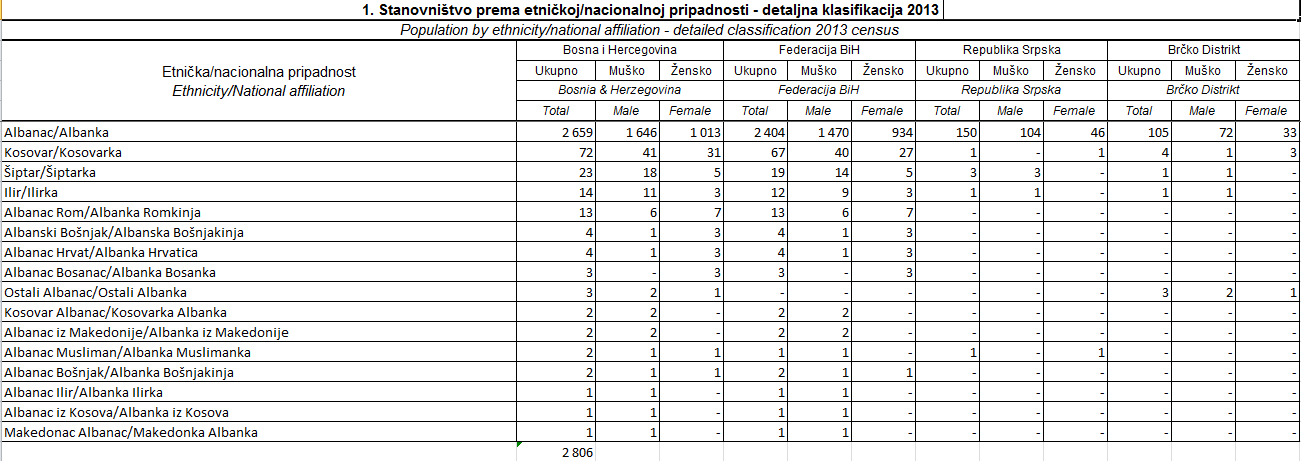
- Albanians in Bosnia 2013 census

Total population
- Bosnia and Herzegovina 2,659 (2,806 including those who self-declared Kosovar, Shqiptar etc) (2013)

Religion
- Majority Islam, minority Catholicism

Related ethnic groups
- Albanians in Croatia

The Albanians of Bosnia and Herzegovina (Albanian: Shqiptarët në Bosnje dhe Hercegovinë; Serbo-Croatian: Albanci u Bosni i Hercegovini) are people of full or partial Albanian ancestry and heritage in Bosnia and Herzegovina.

They are an ethnic group recognized by the Constitution of Bosnia and Herzegovina.

Albanians came to Bosnia in various historical periods. During Ottoman times many Albanians came to perform menial labor and professions of lesser repute and in modern times, they came as seasonal workers, war refugees, or sportspeople. Many people descended from earlier waves of Albanian migration bear surnames of linguistically Albanian origin, but do not speak the language and are not considered to be Albanians therefore the number of 2800 seems a bit lower than expected.

== Clans ==
Burmazi was an Albanian clan with a presence in Herzegovina. Around 1300, the Burmazi clan emerged in the region as a semi-nomadic clan in the area near Stolac and Trebinje. The settlers of Humska zemlja before Tvrtko I were mainly of Albanian origin.

== History ==
=== Middle Ages ===
In the Middle Ages, Albanians lived in the Dalmatian-Herzegovinian hinterland, along with Vlachs. The Albanians lived as semi-nomadic pastoralists (shepherds) and often lived in non-permanent settlements (katund). As time went on, the early Albanian inhabitants were more and more absorbed into the neighboring Slavic population.

==== Srebrenica ====
Albanian presence is attested in the region of Srebrenica in the medieval period. This conclusion can be drawn from the presence of Albanian terms along the Drina River all the way to Srebrenica, which have persisted to the current day in the so-called 'banalacki' hidden dialect. Albanians arrived in this region as mercenaries and graziers, herding their cattle to winter grazing grounds.

=== Ottoman rule ===
There are more sources available about Albanians settling in Bosnia and Herzegovina at the time of Ottoman rule then there are about previous historical epochs. Main causes suggested for their settlement in Bosnia include economic, political and social. Most of them came from Kosovo. In Bosnia and Herzegovina they lived as shepherds, farmers, border guards, skillful craftsmen (especially goldsmiths/jewelers), bakers, but they also rose to highest possible post in the Ottoman Empire, including the posts of Grand Viziers. Many Albanian men never returned to their homeland once they left. When they came to Bosnia and Herzegovina they married local girls, quickly integrated into local society, and built a new life. The story of Albanian emigration is also embodied in the way that emigrant families named Mount Koritnik. They named it 'Tragedy'. The people of the Kukës region followed the emigrants up to Koritnik, where the latter separated from their grieving relatives and continued on to Prizren.

=== Habsburg rule ===
With the arrival of the Austro-Hungarians the number of Albanians decreased, due to further exile in Europe, whose doors became more open. Thus, in the 1910 census, only 273 Albanian-speaking residents in Bosnia and Herzegovina were registered.

=== Kingdom of Yugoslavia ===
During the first and especially the second Yugoslavia, again a large number of Albanians, due to the difficult living conditions in the countries in which they lived (Albania, Kosovo, Montenegro, North Macedonia), settled in Bosnia and Herzegovina, mainly in the cities: Sarajevo, Tuzla, Zenica, Banja Luka, Doboj, Brcko, Bijelina, Mostar and Trebinje. By 1930 the number of Albanians in Bosnia and Herzegovina had almost quadrupled, and according to the 1991 census, there were about 5,000 Albanians in Bosnia and Herzegovina. The then Albanian exiles in Bosnia and Herzegovina were mainly engaged in bakery, confectionery, jewelry and other crafts.

=== Socialist Yugoslavia ===
Most Albanians traditionally lived in Sarajevo. On April 11, 1970 an Albanian Association (Klub Albanaca/Klubi Shqiptar) was officially opened, with Mr. Sejfudin Axhanela as its first founding president. The opening ceremony was attended by famous actors Bekim Fehmiu, Ljuba Tadić and the 'Uka i bjeshkeve te nemura' (Vuk sa Prokletija) movie crew.

In 1970–1981, in Sarajevo, there was a primary school in Albanian, the "Bane Šurbat" school in Grbavica.

== Demographics ==
In the 1910 census there were recorded 273 Albanian speaking people Arbanasi people in Bosnia and Herzegovina.

In the 2013 Bosnian census, there were 2,656 Albanians living in Bosnia, with another 150 people who declared themselves as Shqiptar, Kosovars, Illyrian-Albanian, Bosnian-Albanian etc. to a total of 2806 people or 0.08% of total population. The largest religious groups among the Albanians were Muslims.

=== Religion ===
Religion of the Albanians in Bosnia and Herzegovina according to the 2013 census
1. Islam (88.3%)
2. Catholicism (9.00%)
3. Other (2.70%)

=== Language ===
Mother tongue of the Albanians in Bosnia and Herzegovina according to the 2013 census
1. Albanian (71.5%)
2. Bosnian (22.4%)
3. Other (6.90%)

== Notable people ==
- Zef Kolombi – Albanian painter
- Robert Shvarc - Albanian translator
- Bekim Fehmiu – Actor
- Tinka Kurti – Actress
- Alban Ukaj - Kosovo and Bosnian actor
- Edmond Azemi – Albanian basketball player
- Adrian Nikçi – Swiss-Albanian footballer
- Fahrudin Radončić, Bosnian politician of Albanian descent
- Bekim Sejranović, Bosnian writer
- Mustafa Hasani (sq), Bosnian theolog
- Arijana Jaha, Bosnian judoka
- Arben Avdija (sq), Bosnian footballer
- Semir Devoli (de), Bosnian footballer

== See also ==
- Albanian diaspora
- Ethnic groups in Bosnia and Herzegovina
- Bosniaks in Albania
