= Abdurrahim Buza =

Albanian painter

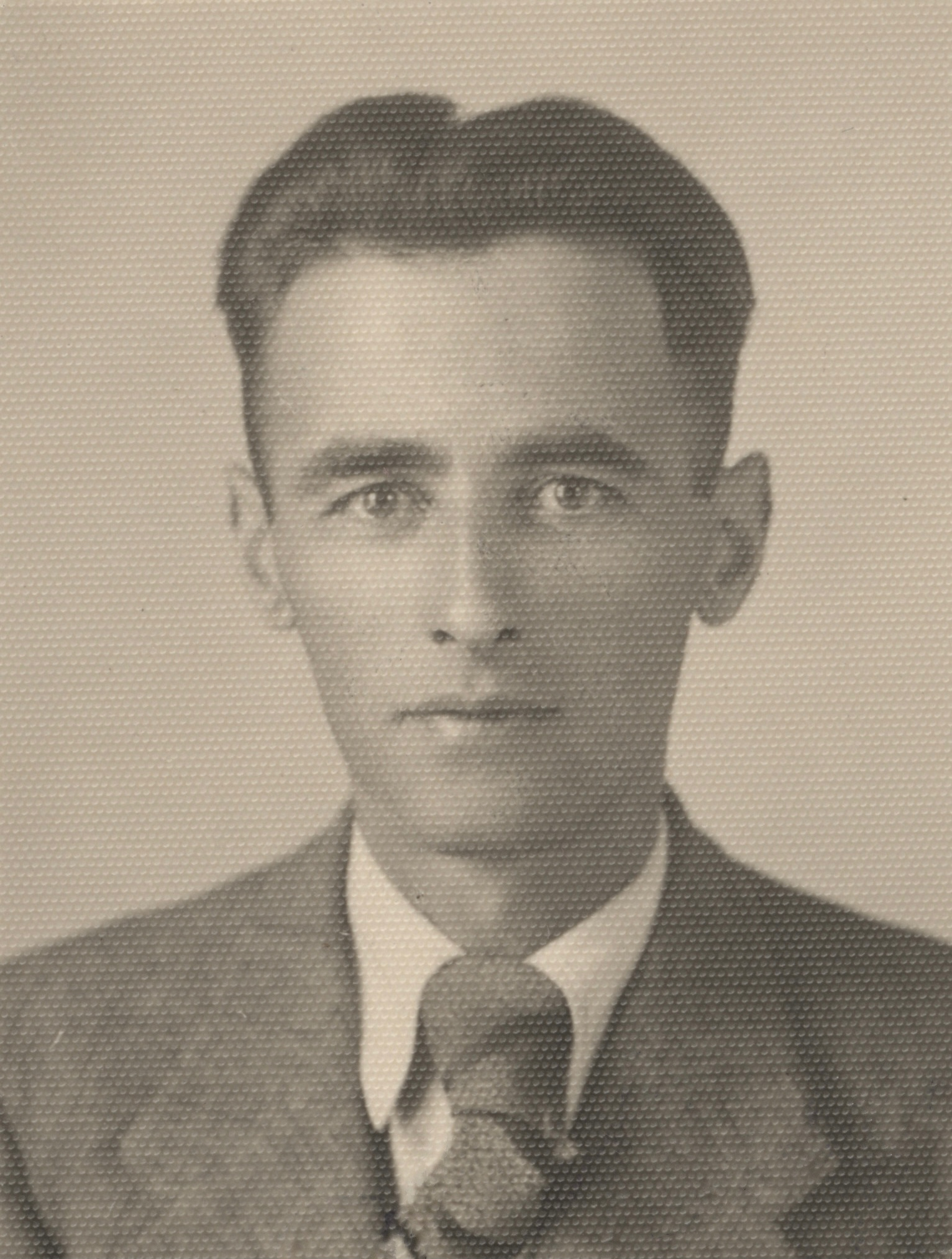
- Abdurrahim Buza, 1930s
- Born: 22 December 1905; Skopje, Ottoman Empire
- Died: 7 November 1986 (aged 80); Tiranë, Albania
- Awards: People's Artist Honor of the Nation

Abdurrahim Buza (22 December 1905 – 7 November 1986) was an Albanian painter in the 20th century.

== Education ==
Buza was born on December 22, 1905, in Skopje, Ottoman Empire (present-day North Macedonia), to a family from Gjakova. He lost his parents at the age of nine.

He pursued basic education in Shkodra, and then secondary studies at the Qemal Stafa High School in Tirana, with the help of Bajram Curri. As a student there, he took part in the June Revolution of June 1924.

Buza was later granted a government scholarship for further studies in Fine Arts in Italy. His lead teachers of Turin and Galileo Chini at the Accademia di Belle Arti di Firenze from 1928 to 1932, were among the most influential artists of the time in Italy.

In 1933, he managed to complete his studies with a degree in Monumental and Decorative Painting.

== Career ==
After his studies, Buza went back to Albania and became a professor of drawing at the Harry Fultz Institute. In 1933 Buza, along with his contemporaries, painter Andrea Kushi, sculptor Odhise Paskali, and painter Mario Ridola, founded the Drawing Artistic School, the first Fine Arts school to open in Tirana, Albania.

In 1935, he painted the first Albanian nude at a time when they were considered to be immoral and unacceptable in Albanian society. Buza's national level exhibit was held in April 1945. Mr. Buza was the illustrator of the first Albanian language primer, published in 1945. Buza taught at the Jordan Misja Artistic Lyceum in Tirana from 1947 until he retired in 1966.

== Artistic style ==
His artistic style is mostly characterized by bright colors. There was a wide range of themes in his painting, which consisted of both portraits and landscapes in Pogradec and Tirana.

The subjects are inspired by the patriotic, national, and homeland-related motives, and rarely by partisan ones. During the 1930s, his drawings depicted the homeless, unemployed, refugees, orphans and portrayed the spirit of the War of National Liberation. After the war, themes of his painting focused on the right of the Albanian people to self-determination. During this time, he celebrated the dramatic reconstruction of Albania in the aftermath of World War II.

== Achievements ==
During his lifetime, he created around 500 oil paintings and thousands of drawings and graphics. His works are preserved in the National Gallery of Arts in Tirana. He given the "Painter of Merit" award by the Albanian Parliament in 1960 and the "Painter of the People" award in 1978.

== Notable works ==
- Dasma kosovare
- Pogradeci
- Lagjja ime Nusja kosovare (1950)
- Një pjate rrush (1957)
- Autoportret (1960)
- Lojërat popullore
- Azem Galica dhe luftëtarët
- Refugjatët

== See also ==
- List of Albanian painters
