= Nimon =

Nimon can refer to:

- Katie Nimon (born 1989 or 1990), a New Zealand politician
- Nimon Lokaj (born 1941), an Albanian painter
- Nimons, a fictional species of aliens in Doctor Who
  - The Horns of Nimon (running 1979 – 1980), a serial in Doctor Who, featuring this alien species
