= Gentian (given name) =

- Gender: Male

Origin
- Region of origin: Albania, Kosovo

Gentian is an Albanian masculine given name and may refer to:

- Gentian Begeja (born 1973), Albanian footballer
- Gentian Bunjaku (born 1993), Swiss footballer
- Gentian Buzali (born 1978), Albanian footballer
- Gentian Çela (born 1981), Albanian footballer
- Gentian Hajdari (born 1975), Albanian footballer
- Gentian Hervetus (1499–1584), French Roman Catholic theologian
- Gentian Koçi (born 1979), Albanian film director and screenwriter
- Gentian Lulani (born 1972), Albanian artist
- Gentian Manuka (born 1991), Albanian footballer
- Gentian Mezani (born 1975), Albanian football coach
- Gentian Muça (born 1987), Albanian footballer
- Gentian Selmani (born 1998), Albanian footballer
- Gentian Stojku (born 1974), Albanian footballer
- Gentian Zenelaj (born 1977), Albanian actor and comedian
