= Petro Zheji =

Albanian linguist, translator, philosopher and author

Petro Spiro Zheji
- Born: 18 October 1929; Tirana, Albania
- Died: 14 March 2015 (aged 85); Tirana, Albania
- Education: University of Tirana
- Occupations: Translator, schoolteacher, writer
- Spouse: Besa Imami
- Children: Artur Zheji
- Writing career
- Notable works: Shqipja dhe sanskritishtja (Albanian and Sanskrit)
- Notable awards: Honor of the Nation

Petro Zheji (18 October 1929 – 14 March 2015) was an Albanian linguist, translator, philosopher and author. He lived and worked intellectually in Tirana. As a polyglot, he was deeply knowledgeable in the Italian, French, English, Spanish, German, Russian, Hebrew, Sanskrit, Ancient Greek, and Latin languages. The Albanologist Robert Elsie considers him "the spiritual father to a whole generation of Albanian intellectuals".

== Life ==
Zheji was born in Tirana, Albania in a family originating from the Zhej village of Zagori. He was the son of Spiro Ballo Zheji, and brother of the other notable Albanian translator Gjergj Zheji. He studied mathematics-physics in a 2-year school in Tirana and afterwards started working as a teacher. Initially at his own high school Qemal Stafa Gymnasium in Tirana, and later in Gjirokastër. Shortly after he registered in the University of Tirana, the Albanian Language branch of the Philology Faculty. For many years he worked as translator for the 8 Nëntori Publishing House and Naim Frashëri Publishing House. He married the Albanian actress Besa Imami, a marriage that lasted 15 years. The couple had one son, Artur Zheji, a known journalist and critic in Albania. After the fall of communism in the early 1990s, he settled in the United States, but returned after a few years.

== Studies on Albanian language ==
His first study on the Albania language came at the end of the 1970s, but could not be published until 2001. The book was titled Shqipja dhe Sankritishtja (Albanian and Sanskrit), a linguistic and logic approach which represented at the same time the first comprehensive and systematic comparison between Albanian and Sanskrit, both seen as an anchor between language and modern languages. The book concentrates on presenting Albanian's key position in etymologizing "en profondeur" not only Sanskrit, but also with languages considered to belong to wholly different language families. The publication saw the light only after the 1990s, and comprises the priceless contribution to Albanological sciences.
The primordial roots of the Albanian language were also covered in his other book Libri i aforizmave (Book of aphorisms) published in 2012.

== Publications ==
=== Books ===
- Shqipja dhe Sanskritishtja (The Albanian and Sanskrit language), Part I, 2001.
- Shqipja dhe Sanskritishtja (The Albanian and Sanskrit language), Part II, 2006.
- Libri i aforizmave (Book of aphorisms), 2012.
- Roli mesianik i shqipes (The messianic role of the Albanian language), 2015.

=== Translations ===
Zheji translated over 30 works into Albanian, some of the best known:

- Resurrection by Leo Tolstoy
- Oblomov by Ivan Goncharov
- The Grapes of Wrath by John Steinbeck
- El Señor Presidente and El Papa verde by Miguel Ángel Asturias
- The Ingenious Gentleman Don Quixote of La Mancha (second part) by Miguel de Cervantes
- The Invisible Man – H. G. Wells
- Life of Galileo – Bertolt Brecht
- Rameau's Nephew – Diderot
- The Sorrows of Young Werther – Goethe
