= Rrashbull =

- Administrative unit
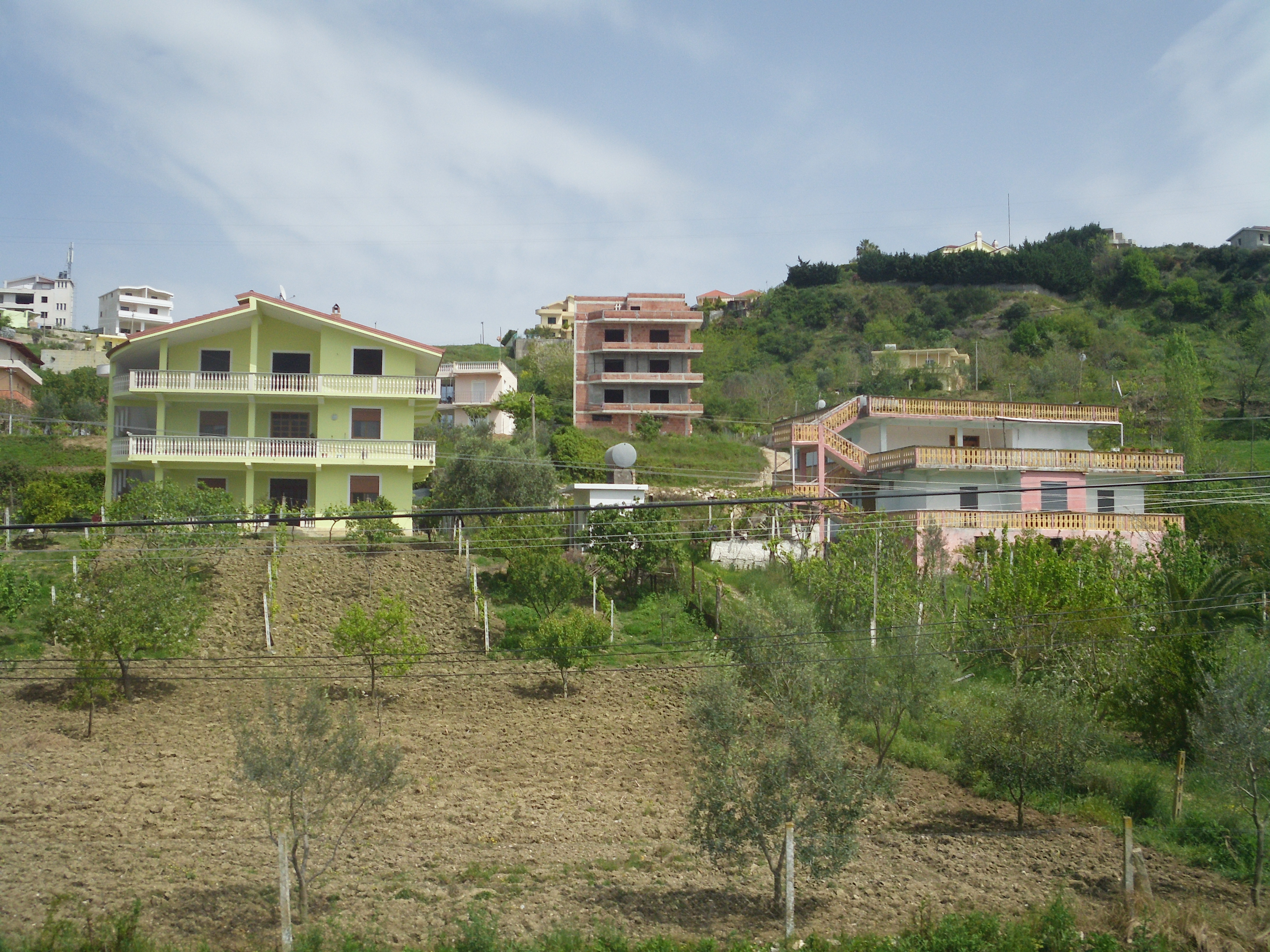
- Houses in Rrashbull

- Location within Albania
- Coordinates: 41°20′N 19°30′E
- Country: Albania
- County: Durrës
- Municipality: Durrës
  - Administrative unit: 55.47 km^{2} (21.42 sq mi)
- Elevation: 5 m (16 ft)

Population (2023)
  - Administrative unit: 20,099
  - Administrative unit density: 362.3/km^{2} (938.5/sq mi)
- Time zone: UTC+1 (CET)
  - Summer (DST): UTC+2 (CEST)
- Postal Code: 2021
- Area Code: (0)574

Rrashbull is a village and a former municipality in Durrës County, western Albania. At the 2015 local government reform it became a subdivision of the municipality Durrës. The population as of the 2023 census is 20,099.

Historical population
Year	Pop.	±%
1989	12,191	—
2001	17,719	+45.3%
2011	24,081	+35.9%
2023	20,099	−16.5%

== Culture ==
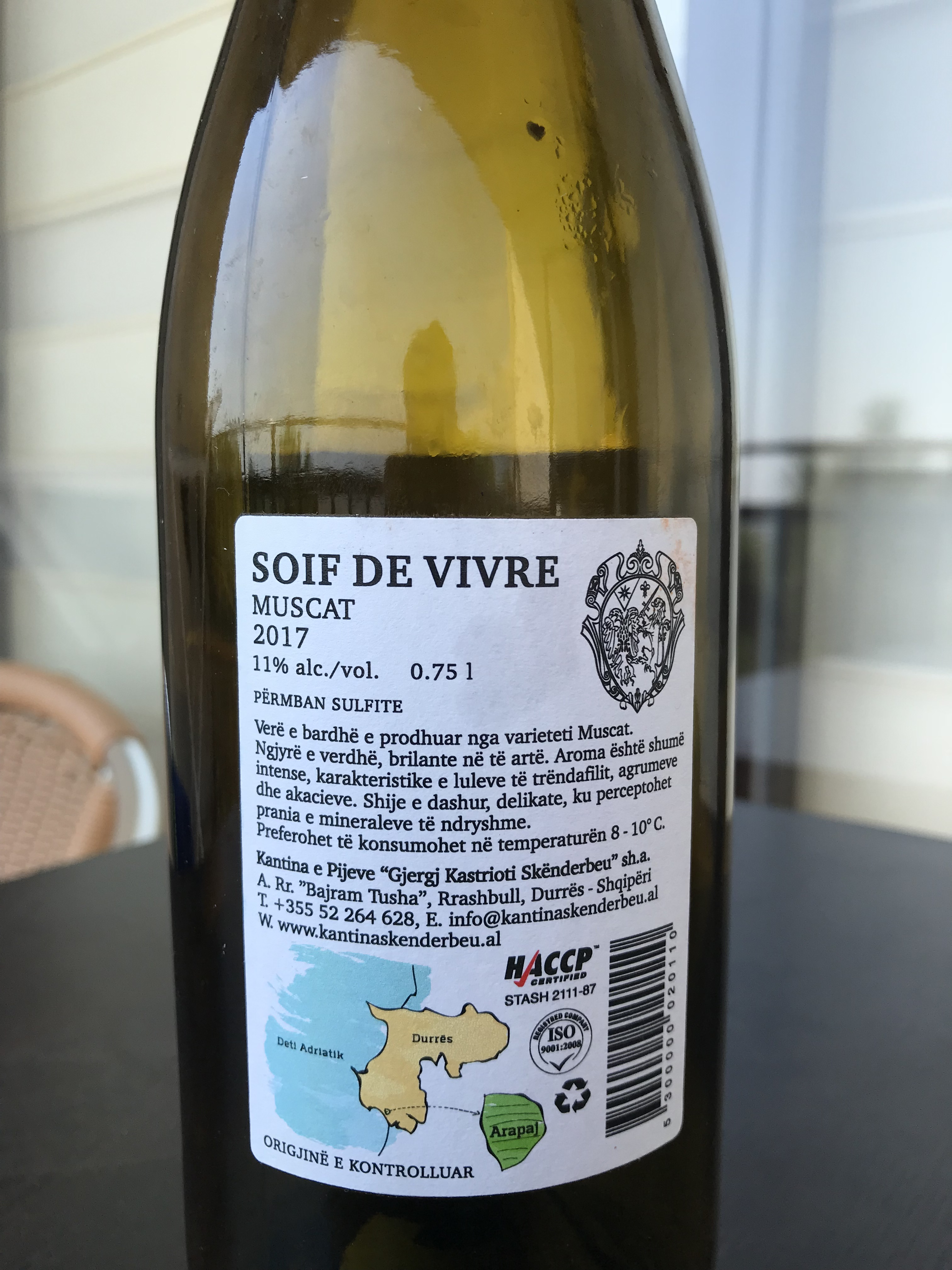

Rrashbull is famous for the Gjergj Kastrioti Skënderbeu Winery, which is also distilled in the village of Arapaj.

== Villages ==
The municipal unit consists of the following villages:

- Arapaj
- Bozanxhije
- Manskuri
- Romanat
- Rrashbull
- Shënavlash
- Shkallnur
- Xhafzotaj
