= Olsi Rama =

Albanian-American association football executive (born 1969)

- Born: 9 September 1969 (age 56); Albania
- Occupations: Scientific researcher; project manager; sports director
- Parents: Kristaq Rama (father); Aneta Rama (mother)
- Relatives: Edi Rama (brother); Zef Kolombi (grand-uncle); Spiro Koleka (great-granduncle)
- Basketball career

Career history
- ?–1996: Dinamo Tirana

Olsi Rama (born 9 September 1969) is an Albanian-American scientific researcher and project manager, currently serving as the General Director of football club Partizani Tirana. Previously, he worked as a scientific researcher and project manager at the Barbara Ann Karmanos Cancer Institute in Detroit, Michigan.

== Career ==
Like his brother Edi, Rama played for Dinamo Tirana basketball until 1996. From 1993 to 1997 he was Program Officer of the Open Society Foundation for Albania (Soros Foundation) where he was in charge of the Youth, Health, Libraries and the East-East programs. Rama moved to the United States in April 1997, after his life was threatened by the secret service because of his involvement with Soros, his activity as a journalist with Worldwide Television News (WTN), and his affiliation with other foreign journalist covering the Albanian insurrection. During his stay in USA, Rama worked as program manager at the Karmanos Cancer Institute in Detroit, one of the 49 comprehensive cancer centers in the United States. In addition, Rama has also worked as a consultant with SciTech Development LLC, a drug development start-up from Detroit. He has helped SciTech with several projects and with their contract negotiations with the National Cancer Institute and the National Institutes of Health.

== Controversies ==
After the clashes in the European Championship qualifier between Serbia and Albania, Olsi Rama was temporarily arrested. According to the Serbian Ministry of Interior, Rama is said to have controlled the drone with an Greater Albanian flag remotely from his VIP box. Rama, who also has a US passport according to media reports, was finally able to travel back to Tirana together with the Albanian team. Why Rama could not be taken into custody, was established in Belgrade legal circles with the more than a month lasting strike of lawyers.

On his arrival in Tirana, Rama said he was neither arrested nor questioned. "I do not understand where that comes from."
