= Arapaj Basilica =

Historic site in Arapaj, Albania

St. Michael Basilica
- Bazilika e Shën Mëhillit (Albanian)
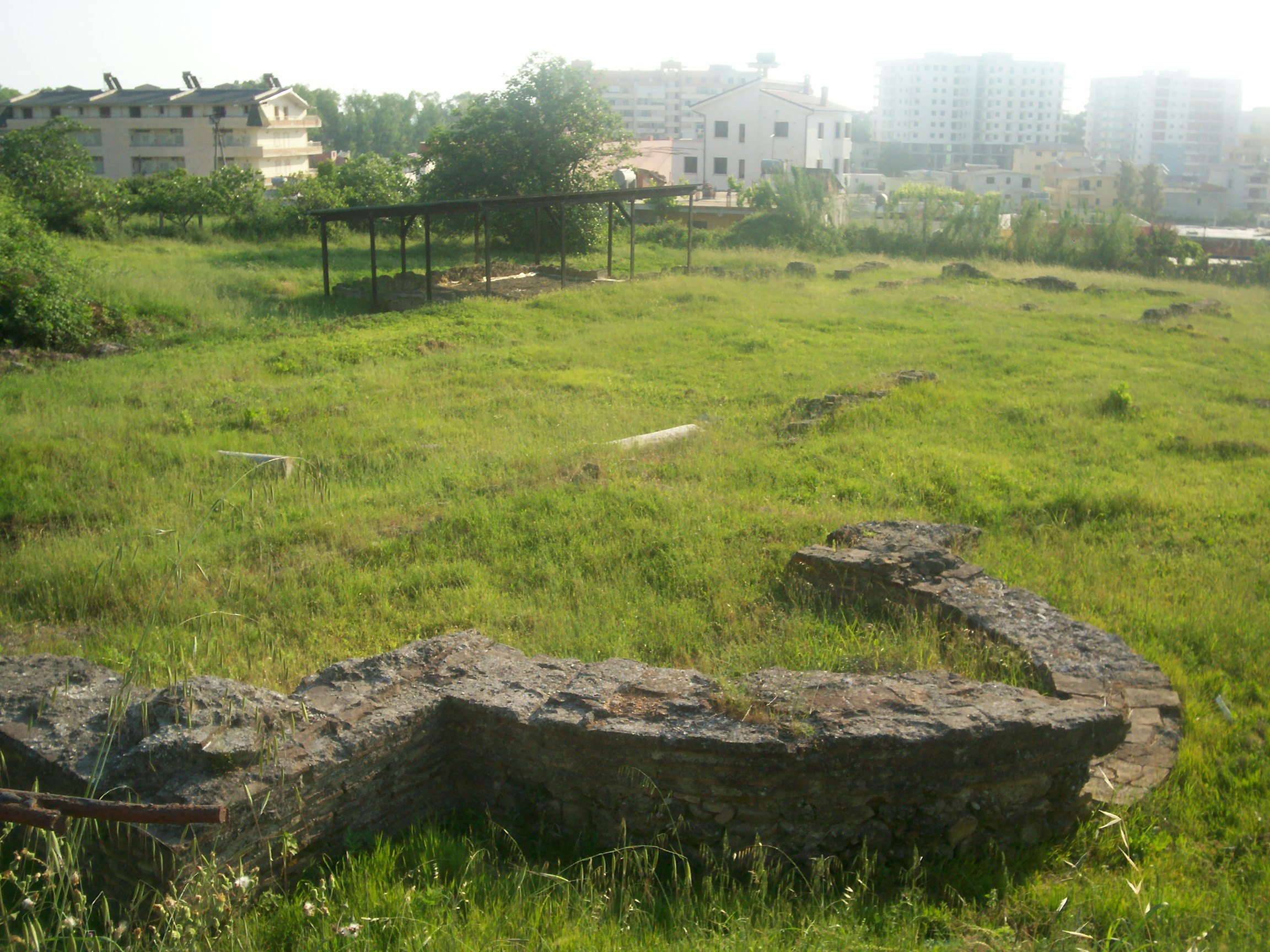
- Basilica of St. Michael

- Location within Albania
- 41°18′05″N 19°30′20″E
- Location: Arapaj, Durrës County

History
- Built: 5th-6th centuries AD

Cultural Monument of Albania

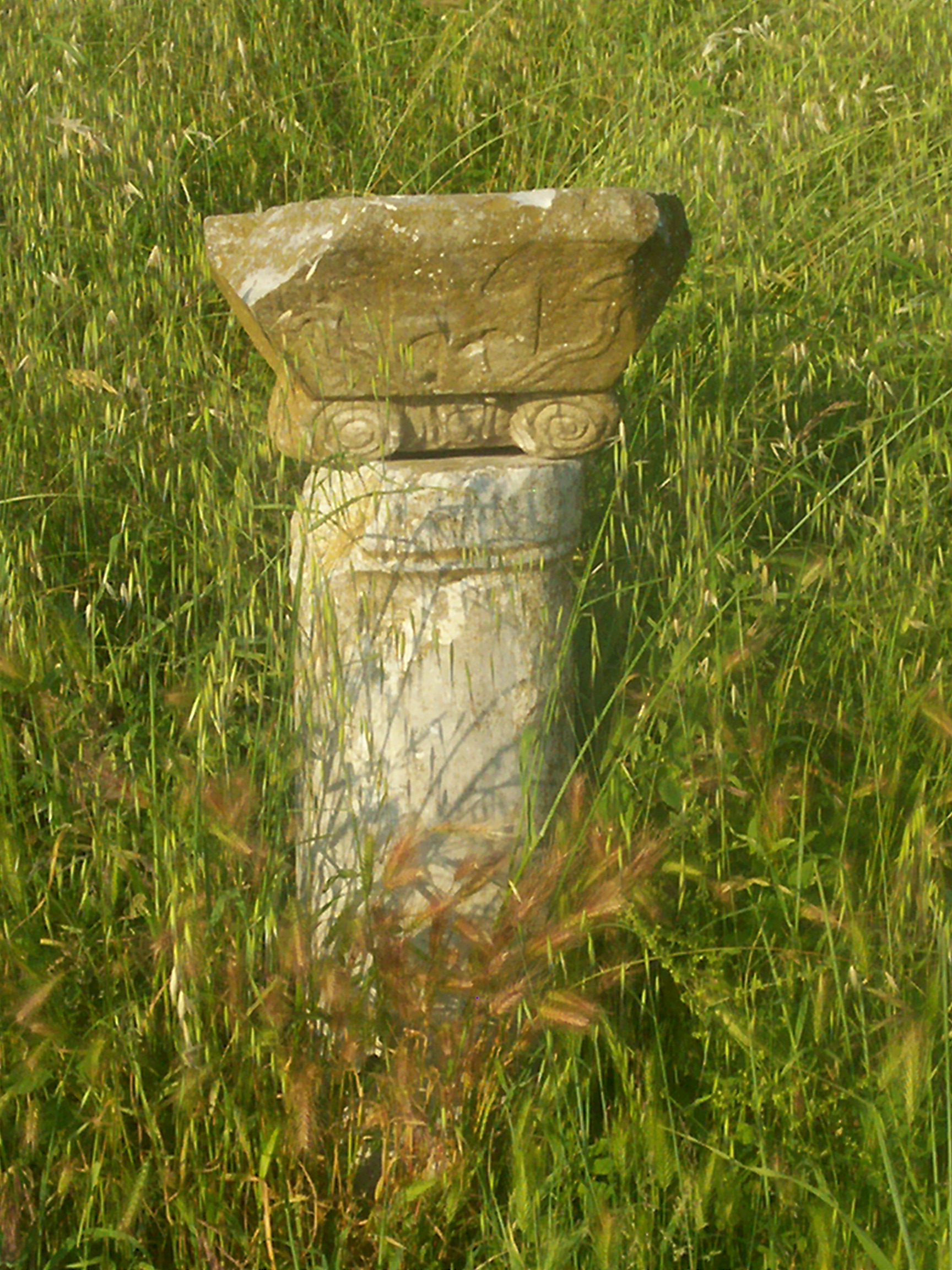
St. Michael Basilica

The Arapaj Basilica or St. Michael Basilica (Albanian: Bazilika e Shën Mëhillit) is a former basilica dedicated to Saint Michael, located in Arapaj, Durrës. Its ruins have been declared a Cultural Monument of Albania. The St. Michael Basilica is an early Palaeo-Christian church which is believed to date to the 5th or 6th century. A mosaic unearthed in the basilica also demonstrates how ingrained Christian culture later was with the early Byzantine Empire.

== Background ==
The construction of the basilica dates back to the 5th – 6th centuries, as the monogrammed pavement found in the atrium dates back to the reign of the Byzantine emperor Anastasius I Dicorus (491–518). The basilica is believed to have been dedicated to the Archangel Michael and was in use until the 11th century, when, according to research, the building was set on fire by the Norman army led by Robert Guiscard, who occupied Dürrakhion in 1081. In the area of the destroyed basilica, members of the bodyguard of the Byzantine emperor Alexios I Komnenos who had fallen in battle were buried.

The ruins were not discovered until 1974 by two Albanian archaeologists, Hava and Sali Hidri, and the foundations of the building and the famous mosaic were not excavated until 1981–1983. Based on the sporadic finds found here, the narrower surroundings of the former church may have been inhabited until the 13th century, but the basilica was forgotten for centuries to come.

== Description ==
The basilica is located 5 km southeast of the center of Durrës, 10 km by road, on the southern border of the village of Arapaj, on the side of St. Michael's Hill (Kodra e Shën Mëhillit). The site is surrounded by a fence, but can be accessed and walked in through a gate that opens from the north side. The longitudinal axis of the east-facing basilica is approx. 60 meters, 20 meters wide at the narthex and 30 meters at the apse of the aisles. It is of the three-lobed type, that is, the eastern ends of both the two aisles and the main nave enclosed by them end in an apse, a semicircular sanctuary. Based on art historical research, the three-lobed floor plan characterized the basilicas assigned to the cult of saints and martyrs in the region, and presumably the main task of the Arapaj may have been to preserve a relic. The four entrances to the building opened from the narthex bordering the atrium on the west side, two to the main nave and one to the aisles. Attached to the south side of the basilica is a smaller burial chamber buried in the ground, in which the remains of a man and a woman have been excavated by archaeologists. The top of the tomb is covered by a richly colored (polychrome) 54-square-foot mosaic that has survived to this day (however, for reasons of conservation, it is covered with a layer of gravel so it is not visible).

The interior of the basilica was divided by a carved columned column, but some fragments of stone and bronze statues were also unearthed during the excavations. Representations of contemporary geometric mosaics known from the territory of present-day Albania, but also moving away from the sacral (mythical or biblical) in the direction of the profane, make the Arapaj site special. Two scenes can be seen on the mosaic surface: in one part, two contemporary peasants — a woman and a man — sit outdoors surrounded by their dogs, horses, goats, and sheep; the other half of the panel depicts a two-eared crater, from whose mouth the wine flows in two directions, and a stag and a cow approach each branch of the resulting wine stream to quench their thirst. It is believed that the first image depicts the paradise life of the deceased couple, while the wine spilling out of the crater is an iconographic reference to the death of Christ and the Eucharist, possibly showing an allegorical couple drinking from the source of eternal life after death.
