= Aneta Rama =

Albanian dentist (1938–2020)

- Born: Aneta Koleka; 1 September 1938; Vuno, Himarë, Kingdom of Albania
- Died: 1 August 2020 (aged 81); Tirana, Albania
- Education: Medical Academy of Łódź
- Occupation: Dentist
- Spouse: Kristaq Rama
- Children: Edi and Olsi Rama
- Relatives: Spiro Koleka (granduncle)
- Awards: Honor of Albanian Dentistry (2018)

Aneta Rama (née Koleka; 1 September 1938 – 1 August 2020) was an Albanian dentist. She was one of the first female dentists in Albania. She was the mother of Albanian Prime Minister Edi Rama.

== Early life and education ==
Rama was born in the village of Vuno, on the southern coast of Albania. She studied medicine and dentistry at the Medical Academy of Łódź in Poland, where she completed her professional qualifications.

== Career ==
Rama practiced dentistry in Albania for much of her life. She was among the earliest women in the country to enter the profession.

== Awards and honours ==
In 2018, she was recognized by the Order of Dentists of Albania with the title Honor of Albanian Dentistry (Albanian: Nderi i Stomatologjisë Shqiptare).

== Personal life and death ==
Rama was married to the Albanian sculptor Kristaq Rama. They had two sons, Edi Rama (current Prime Minister of Albania) and Olsi Rama (General Director of football club Partizani Tirana).

Rama died on 1 August 2020 in Tirana.
