= Shaqir Veseli =

Albanian painter and animator

- Born: 1957 (age 68–69)
- Known for: Painting, animation

Shaqir Veseli (born 1957) is an Albanian painter and animation filmmaker from Krujë, Albania. Some of his paintings are part of the collection of the National Museum of Fine Arts (Albania).

Veseli has spoken about the problems caused for animated films by lack of funding from the National Center of Cinematography.

== Filmography ==
- 1994 Biba, director
- 1998 production designer for the film Kolonel Bunker from the director Kujtim Çashku
- 2001 set decorator for the film Slogans (Parrullat), from director Gjergj Xhuvan, one of the winning films at the Tokyo Film Festival
- Is the author of the animated films Coffee Bar – Kafeneja, Tsunami and Guernika.

== Awards ==
In 2013, he was awarded the Grand Prix at the Theranda Animation Film Festival for Tsunami. The film had also been awarded the Jury Prize at Dokufest in 2009.

== See also ==
- Modern Albanian art
- List of Albanian painters
- Cinema of Albania
