= Fatos Arapi =

Albanian poet, writer, translator and journalist

- Born: 19 July 1930; Zvërnec, Vlorë, Albania
- Died: 11 October 2018 (aged 88)
- Occupations: Poet, short story writer, journalist, translator
- Parent: Tol Stavre Arapi (Father)

Fatos Arapi (19 July 1930 – 11 October 2018) was an Albanian poet, short story writer, translator and journalist. Arapi's publications have been highly praised by his readers and his peers and have been awarded various national and international poetry prizes. In 2008 Arapi became the first Albanian poet to win the Golden Wreath Award (Struga Poetry Evenings Award).

== Early life ==
Arapi was born to Tol Stavre Arapi in 1930 in Zvërnec, Vlorë. His family have roots in Arapaj a village in Durrës, hence their surname. He studied economics in Sofia, Bulgaria from 1949 to 1954, then worked as a journalist in Tirana.

== Career ==
Arapi was a professor of History and Philology at the University of Tirana.

Arapi was a pioneer of free verse and experimental poetry in 1960s Albanian literature. He wrote about the maritime universe. He authored more than twenty-five books including six poetry collections and many short stories and novels. He translated the works of Sappho, Pablo Neruda and Nikola Vaptsarov into Albanian. He was the editor-in-chief of two anthologies: Songs of the Peoples and Anthology of Turkish Verse.

Arapi made his debut in published poetry in the second half of the fifties, and in 1962 and 1966 he published two poetry collections, Poetic Paths and Poems and Verses. Later came Rhythm of Iron, Give me a name, Gloria Victis and Solar Eclipse. Arapi was also known for his versatile prose. He wrote several novels, including Wild Geese, Snow Cove, and Headless Genius. He was also the editor-in-chief of two anthologies: Songs of the People and Anthology of Turkish Verse.

== Death ==
Arapi died on 11 October 2018.

== Works ==
=== Poetry ===
- Shtigjet poetike (Poetic Paths), 1962
- Poema dhe vjersha (Poems and Verses), 1966
- Ritme të hekura (Rhythms of Iron), 1968
- Më jepni një emër (Give Me A Name), 1972 (later banned by Enver Hoxha's regime)
- Gloria victis, 1997
- Eklipsi i endrrës (Solar Eclipse), 2002

=== Short stories ===
- Patate të egra (Sour Potatoes), 1970
- Dikush më buzëqeshte (Someone Was Smiling At Me), 1972
- Gjeniu pa kokë (Headless Genius), 1999

=== Plays ===
- Partizani pa emër (The Anonymous Partisan), 1962
- Qezari dhe ushtari i mirë Shvejk (Caesar and the Good Soldier Švejk), 1995
