= Parid Dule =

Albanian painter

- Born: 1969 (age 56–57); Përmet, Albania
- Occupations: Painter, Karate instructor
- Website: Official Page

Parid Dule (born 1969) is an Albanian painter and karate instructor or martial arts trainer who lives and works in Tirana, originating from Përmet Albania. Vivaldi's Four Seasons inspired his latest exhibition in the National Historical Museum (Albania) in April 2011.

Parid is a member of an artist's family, including his uncle sculptor Hektor Dule. Dule is an ex-Champion karate Master. Parid is the winner of many international competitions in karate.

== Life ==
In 1979 Dule started to exhibit in the House of Pioneers in Tirana every year and was rewarded with many prizes. One of his works was bought as part of the art collection of ex-UN Secretary-General Javier Pérez de Cuéllar, who visited that Albanian capital during that period. In 1994 Dule graduated from the Academy of Arts in Tirana.

== See also ==
- List of Albanians (Martial artists)
- Modern Albanian art
- List of Albanian painters
