= Esat Valla =

Albanian painter

- Born: 22 April 1944 (age 82); Gjakova, Albanian Kingdom
- Occupations: Painter, professor of art

Esat Valla (born 22 April 1944) is a Kosovar Albanian painter noted for his figurative paintings of small animals or insects such as butterflies and birds.

== Life ==
Esat Valla was born on 22 April 1944 in Gjakova, where he attended primary school. In 1965 he graduated from the Secondary School of Art in Peć. In 1971 he graduated from the Academy of Arts in Belgrade (now the University of Arts in Belgrade), where he studied painting under professor Zoran Petrovic. From 1974 he was a member of the Association of Figurative Artists of Kosovo. He has been working at the Faculty of Arts since 1976, where he teaches painting to undergraduates and graduates, with the title of Ordinary Professor at the Universiteti i Prishtinës. In 1981 he received a master's degree from the Academy of Figurative Arts. From 1982–84 he was chairman of the Association of Figurative Artists in Gjakova and from 1990–96 he was chairman of the Association of Figurative Artists of Kosovo. He has studied in Italy, France, Spain, Portugal, Czechoslovakia, Poland, Turkey, Greece and Albania.

== Work ==
Esat Valla's work is surreal, half figurative, half abstract and highly individualistic. He has participated in many group exhibitions, as well as personal exhibitions both nationally and internationally. His work is held in various galleries, museums and private collections.

In December 2013 the Kosova National Art Gallery opened a retrospective exhibition with 60 paintings by Esat Valla from his early youth in 1964 up to 2013. The curator, Zeni Ballazhi, said he tried to select works from the artist's different cycles or periods. One of these cycles is "Butterflies", created from March 1981 at the time of the demonstrations in Kosovo as a metaphor of sacrificed youth. Works, some of which had not been exhibited before, included drawings and paintings on paper and fabric. Themes included Albanian traditions, as well as surreal and abstract works.

== Awards ==
Awards include:

- 1974 – The Public's Prize, Spring Salon, Pristina
- 1978 – League of Prizren Prize, Prizren
- 1980 – The Public's Prize, Spring Salon, Pristina
- 1982 – Mosa Pijade Prize, the ll-th Kosova Spring Salon, Pristina
- 1983 – Prize at the 9th Biennial of Drawing, Pristina
- 1988 – The Public's Prize, Spring Salon, Pristina
- 1994 – Prize for Painting , The Migration contest

== See also ==
- List of Albanian painters

== Sources ==
- "Esat Valla", Albanian arts.com
- "Nesër hapet ekspozita e artistit Esat Valla", Gazeta Express (in Albanian), 17 December 2013
- "Piktori Esat Valla ekspozon veprat e karrierës", Kultplus (in Albanian), 2013-12-18
- "Retrospective exhibition of Esat Valla opens in National Gallery", Kosovalive, Kosovalive Media Group, 19 December 2013
