= Gentium (disambiguation) =

Gentium is an open Unicode serif typeface by Victor Gaultney.

Gentium may also refer to :

- Gentium (pharmaceutical company), a former company focused on development of drugs for rare diseases
- Consensus gentium, a fallacious argument that concludes a proposition to be true because many or all people believe it

== See also ==
- Jus gentium, originally the part of Roman law that the Roman Empire applied to its dealings with foreigners
- Lumen gentium, the Dogmatic Constitution on the Church, is one of the principal documents of the Second Vatican Council
- Gentian (disambiguation)
