= Fatos Kongoli =

Albanian novelist

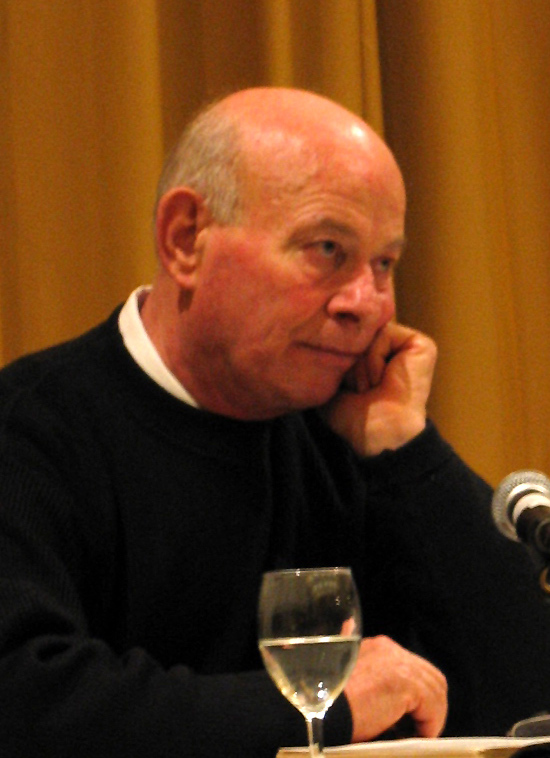
- Born: January 12, 1944 (age 82); Elbasan, German-occupied Albania
- Education: Qemal Stafa High School
- Occupation: Writer
- Family: Kongoli

Fatos Kongoli (born January 12, 1944) is an Albanian novelist.

== Biography ==
Kongoli was born and raised in Elbasan and studied at the Qemal Stafa High School, in Tirana, Albania. He studied mathematics at university in China during the Sino-Albanian split. During the communist era in Albania, he was employed as a mathematician and did not publish any major works.

== Works ==
Fatos Kangoli's first major novel, The Loser (I humburi, Tirana 1992; English edition, 2007), is set in March 1991, featuring a former university student, Thesar Lumi, who reflects on his life in Hoxhaist Albania and contemplates the futility of struggle and ambition under totalitarian communism. It was first published in 1992, in 10,000 copies, a relatively high number, and found success among the Albanian reading public.

Among Kongoli's subsequent novels are: Kufoma, 1994 (The Corpse), which elaborated on his first novel's themes; Dragoi i fildishtë, 1999 (The Ivory Dragon), which focuses primarily on the life of an Albanian student in China in the 1960s; and Lëkura e qenit, 2003, a love story highlighting forgotten affection.

Kongoli's novels have been translated into French, German, Italian, Greek, Esperanto, Spanish and Slovak.

== Sources ==
- Albanian literature from Robert Elsie

== Books by Fatos Kongoli ==
- Books by Fatos Kongoli gjemite e mbytura
