= Arapaj =

- Village
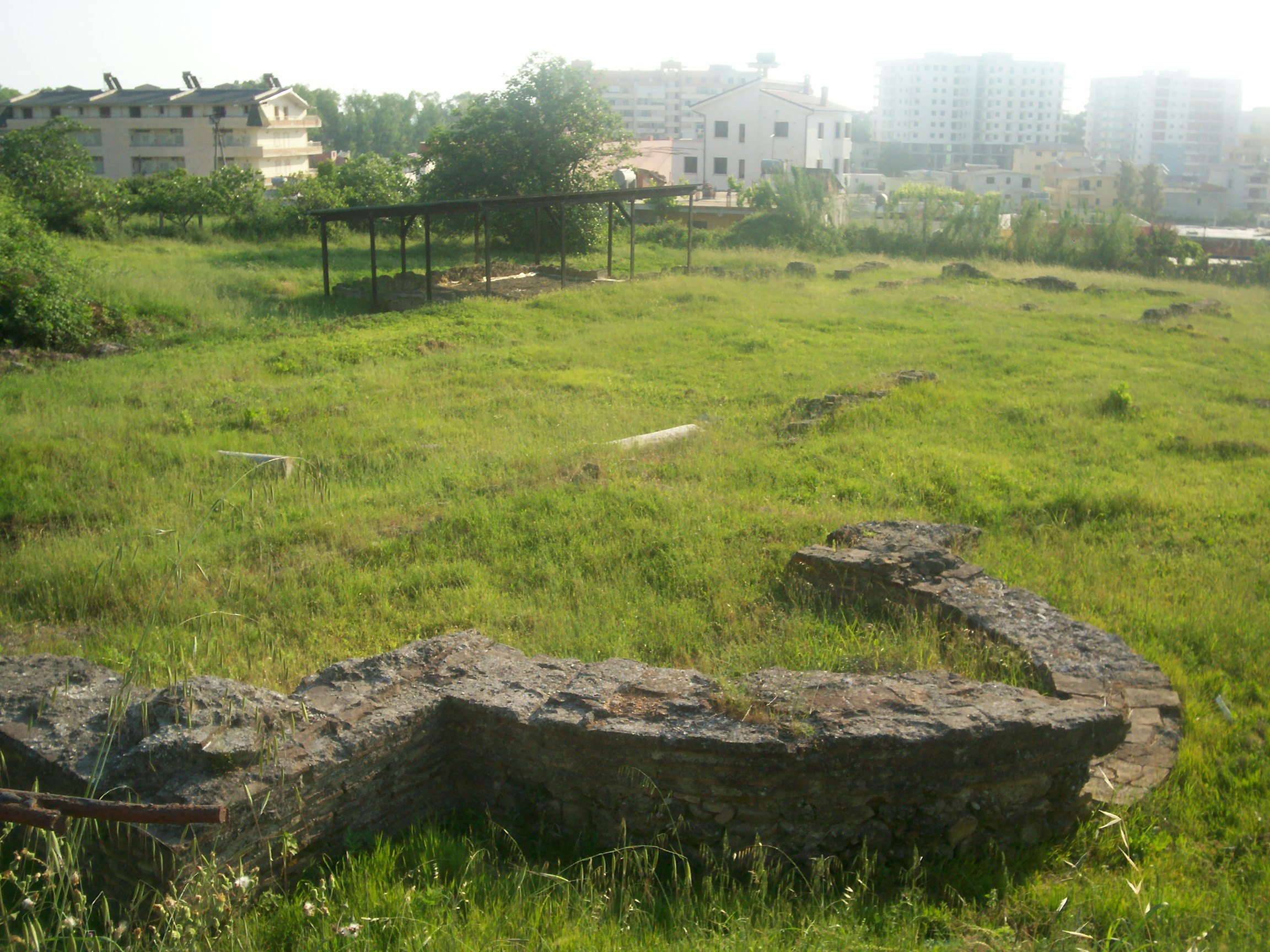
- The ruins of the Paleochristian St. Michael Basilica in Arapaj

- Location within Albania
- Coordinates: 41°18′11″N 19°30′20″E
- Country: Albania
- County: Durrës
- Municipality: Durrës
- Administrative unit: Rrashbull
- Time zone: UTC+1 (CET)
  - Summer (DST): UTC+2 (CEST)

Arapaj is a village in the former municipality of Rrashbull, Durrës County, Albania. The etymological origin of the name Arapaj is hypothesised to come from the word Arap which means Arab in Albanian, and it comes from the Turkish word which is the same. This possibly indicates there was an Arab settlement in this village. Durrës did receive Arab traders along the coast.

At the 2015 local government reform it became part of the municipality Durrës. It is a southern suburb of Durrës, located near the Mediterranean coast, approximately 6 kilometres south of this city.

Arapaj is a noted archaeological site, containing the substantial St. Michael Basilica dedicated to Saint Michael, an early Palaeo-Christian church which is believed to back to the fifth or sixth century. It has been declared a Cultural Monument of Albania because of its architectural significance. A mosaic unearthed in the Basilica also demonstrates how engrained its culture was later on with the early Byzantine Empire.

"Gjergj Kastrioti Skënderbeu Winery", is distilled in the village of Arapaj.

== Notable people with roots from ==
Fatos Arapi (19 July 1930 – 11 October 2018) was an Albanian poet, short story writer, translator and journalist.

Renato Arapi (born 28 August 1986) is an Albanianprofessional football coach and former left-back and centre-back. He is an assistant coach with the Saudi club Ohod Club.

Lindita Arapi (born 30 June 1972) is an Albanianwriter and journalist. She is cited as a noteworthy example of a generation of female Albanian writers.

Mustafa Arapi is an Albanian painter, lecturer and art restorer
