= Ndoc Martini =

Albanian painter

- Born: Ndoc Camaj (Zamaj); 17 January 1880; Shkodër, Albania (then Ottoman Empire)
- Died: 6 December 1916 (aged 36); Paris, France

Ndoc Martini (born Ndoc Camaj; [also spelled Zamaj] 17 January 1880 – 6 December 1916) was an Albanian painter.

== Life ==
Martini was born in Shkodër, north Albania, then in the Ottoman Empire. He was a Roman Catholic, and his family spoke the Gheg dialect of the Albanian language. He took his first lessons from Kolë Idromeno in his home town at the School of Arts and Crafts. From 1904 to 1907 he lived in Calabria, Italy on a scholarship from the "Scuola Normale nel Collegio Italo-Albanese di San Demetrio Corone". After that he studied at the Académie des Beaux-Arts in Paris. He had to interrupt his studies because of financial issues, but kept working as a painter in the Pensi studio. In 1913 he started suffering from tuberculosis and died in 1916 in a sanatorium in Paris, France.

== Sources and external links ==
- Piktori Ndoc Martini, jeta dhe veprat e tij ShkodraDaily (in Albanian)
