= Fatmir Toçi =

Albanian publisher (born 1958)

Fatmir Toçi (born 24 April 1958, in Tirana) is an Albanian writer and publisher who currently serves as the president of "Toena" Publishing House. He is also the president of the Association of Albanian Publishers.
