= Genc Mulliqi =

Albanian painter and sculptor

- Born: 21 January 1966 (age 60); Fier, Albania
- Known for: Abstract painting, sculpture
- Website: gencmulliqi.com

Genc Mulliqi (born 21 January 1966 in Fier, Albania) is an Albanian artist, specialising in sculptures and abstract paintings. He has studied in England and Tirana. Mulliqi lives in Tirana and works as a director at the National Art Gallery of Albania there.

== See also ==
- List of Albanian painters
- List of sculptors
