= Fatmir Doga =

American actor (born 1967)

- Born: Fatmir Doga; July 5, 1967 (age 58); Bulqize, Albania
- Occupations: Director, Producer, Writer, Actor
- Years active: 1973–present

Fatmir Doga (born 1967 in Albania) began acting at age five and has appeared in more than seventy theater and television productions. He attended the University of Arts of Albania in Tirana from 1987 to 1991. After completing his studies at the Academy of Fine Arts, he worked in Albania and Italy. Fatmir moved to Canada in 1998, where he continued his career as an actor and director. In 2008 he began working in Los Angeles, where he produced and directed several feature films.
