= Arthur Tashko =

Albanian painter

Arthur Tashko (10 April 1901 – 1994) was an Albanian painter. He lived and worked in the United States and in Colombia.

== Life ==
He was born in Korçë, in the Manastir Vilayet of the Ottoman Empire (present-day Albania) 10 April 1901. As a cubist painter he exposed his art works in Vienna, Austria together with Picasso, Léger, Delaunay, Jean Arp and after a period he met with abstract expressionists Pollock, de Kooning and Rothko. In 1923 invited from his brother Kostandin Tashko who was a diplomat in Albanian Embassy in Washington, D.C. United States, and he transferred to Boston and graduated from Harvard Law School. After his career as a lawyer, he studied Fine Arts in the Museum of Fine Arts, Boston and deepen his knowledge in Boston Conservatory for flute sharing this passion with his sister famous Albanian singer Tefta Tashko-Koço. In 1962, he moved from the United States to Spain and after with his second wife Rosa in Bogotá, Colombia and lived and worked there for 31 years. Arthur Tashko died in 1994, at the age of 93 years.

== See also ==
- Modern Albanian art
