= Gentian, Michigan =

- Unincorporated community
- Location within the state of Michigan Gentian (the United States)
- Coordinates: 46°25′52″N 87°28′00″W
- Country: United States
- State: Michigan
- County: Marquette
- Township: Sands
- Elevation: 1,243 ft (379 m)
- Time zone: UTC-5 (Eastern (EST))
  - Summer (DST): UTC-4 (EDT)
- ZIP code(s): 49855 (Marquette)
- Area code: 906
- GNIS feature ID: 1617580

Gentian is an unincorporated community in Marquette County in the U.S. state of Michigan. The community is located within Sands Township. As an unincorporated community, Gentian has no legally defined boundaries or population statistics of its own.

== History ==
Gentian was named from the fringed gentian flowers growing near the town site.
