= Miranda Kalefi =

Albanian painter (born 1963)

- Born: 1963 (age 62–63); Albania
- Occupation: Painter

Miranda Kalefi (born in Kavajë) is an Albanian painter. She attended the Academy of Fine Arts in Ravenna, Italy where she has resided since 1994. Kalefi has participated in a number of group exhibitions in Ravenna and has collaborated with the Art Gallery of "Albero Celeste" of S.Giminiamo in Siena.
