= Zef Kolombi =

Albanian painter (1907–1949)

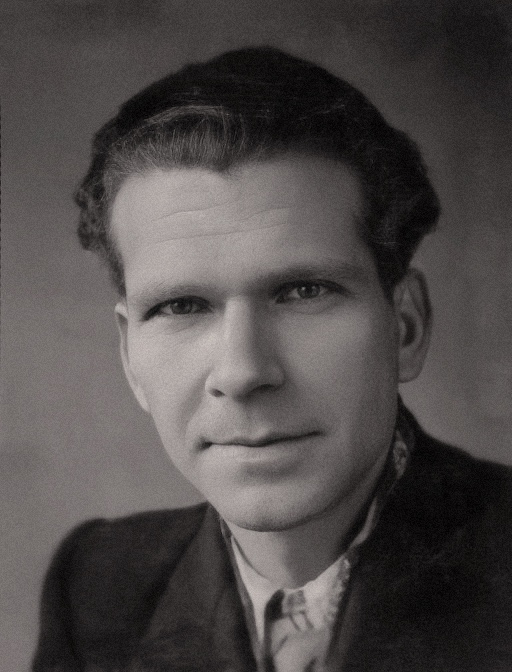
- Portrait photograph of Zef Kolombi
- Born: March 3, 1907; Sarajevo, Bosnia and Herzegovina, then Austria-Hungary
- Died: January 23, 1949 (aged 41); Shkodër, PR Albania
- Education: Accademia di Belle Arti, Rome
- Occupations: Painter; drawer; writer
- Relatives: Kristaq Rama (nephew); Edi Rama (great-nephew); Olsi Rama (great-nephew)

Zef Kolombi (March 3, 1907 – January 23, 1949) was an Albanian painter.

== Early life ==
Zef Kolombi was born in Sarajevo to John Kolombi and Francisca Hajdovnik-Kolombi. His father was Albanian and his mother was of Slovene descent. His father, John, was the owner of a hotel in Sarajevo; he died in 1910, and a year later, his mother died. Kolombi, along with his sister Vera, moved to Shkodër with their grandmother, which was then part of the Ottoman Empire. After the death of his grandmother, the two children were in the care of their godfather, Sokrat Shkreli. His sister Veronika Kolombi is the grandmother of the Prime Minister of Albania, Edi Rama.

== Career ==
In Shkodër, he finished elementary school-orphanage opened by the Austrians, and spent three years in the Jesuit school. He found a devotion to painting, his passion, but with difficulty. He went to Italy and visited museums, art galleries and painting exhibitions. At the age of 18, Kolombi returned to Shkodër and worked as a clerk in the Hotel Grand.

In 1929, after receiving a state scholarship from Hil Mosi, Kolombi departed again for Italy, where he studied at the Accademia di Belle Arti in Rome. Upon completion, he returned to Albania and was appointed drawing teacher in Elbasan, where he spent the next ten years. In 1936, he married and had one son, Julian, and by a second marriage had another son Gjovalinin, while continuing to paint and carry out the tasks of a teacher.

Kolombi painted with materials such as cloth, canvas, cardboard and plywood, while most of his work is in oil, using more red, brown, green and white. Kolombi's work Columbus is in the National Gallery of Arts in Tirana. His portfolio consists of 50 paintings and drawings containing realist landscapes (A Harvest, 1947), still-life (Grapes and Pears, 1940) and portraits (Julian, 1946). These paintings were often executed en plein air which are distinguished with a balance of composition and a plethora of colours and tones.

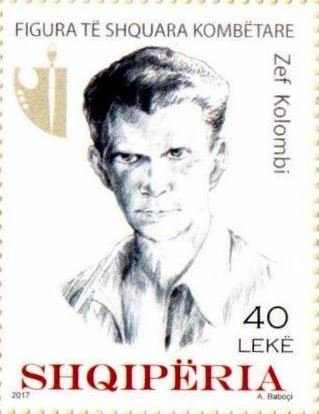
Kolombi on a 2017 stamp of Albania

== Death ==
Kolombi suffered from asthma and tuberculosis in the last two years of his life and died on January 23, 1949.
