= Agim Kadillari =

Albanian painter

Agim Kadillari (born 1953) is an Albanian painter.

Active since 1976, he has given exhibitions in Tirana, Cetinje (Montenegro), Assen (Netherlands), Haren (Germany) and Crete (Greece).

== See also ==
- List of Albanian painters
