= Agathangjel Mbrica =

Albanian painter and goldsmith (1883–1957)

Agathangjel Mbrica (1883–1957) was an Albanian artist and goldsmith.

Agathangjel Mbrica was born in Berat, a city in what was then the Ottoman Empire in 1883. His father Dhimitraq Mbrica was a tailor who specialized in making xhamadans and fustanellas.

From the age of 14, Agathangjel Mbrica started working as a goldsmith's apprentice to Aleks Kola in his store. During the 1920s, Mbrica became one of the most renowned goldsmiths in Albania. He forged a gold medal requested by the teachers of Berat to honour Avni Rustemi, an activist and teacher.

In 1938, he forged a gold double-headed eagle as a present for Zog I, the king of Albania. In 1950, he forged a gold pigeon (as a symbol of peace), which was used to honor Joseph Stalin. Many of Mbrica's works were inspired by religious events. His most famous work is a large gold icon titled The Departure of Elijah.
