= Robert Shvarc =

Albanian translator, writer and poet

Robert Shvarc (10 December 1932 – 25 April 2003) born in Sarajevo, Bosnia, was an Albanian translator, writer and poet, recognized as one of the best translators from German of the 20th century and beginning of new millennium. His mother was from Elbasan and his Jewish father was from Austria, and they lived in Shkodër, Albania. There, Robert Shvarc grew up as a lover of his Albanian mother's language and is the first who brought to the Albanian reader some masterpieces of literature such as the novels of Gabriel García Márquez, Erich Maria Remarque, Lion Feuchtwanger, dramas of Bertolt Brecht; books of poetry from Goethe, Schiller, and Heine. Also Shvarc translated into German many books of prominent Albanian poets and writers.

== Prizes and awards ==
- 1995 – Embassy of Germany in Tirana, Albania awarded Shvarc the prize "German Federal Cross of Merit" – "Kryqi i meritave gjermane", which was practiced for first time in this country of Balkans.
- 2002 – Shvarc was awarded by Albanian Capitol's Municipality the title Honor Citizen of Tirana.
- 2002 – The President of the Republic of Albania awarded Shvarc the title Great Master – Mjeshtër i Madh (Grand Master of Work).
