= Fatmir Hasani =

Serbian politician (born 1957)

- Фатмир Хасани

Member of the National Assembly
- In office 3 June 2016 – 3 August 2020

Personal details
- Born: 1957 (age 68–69) Bujanovac, PR Serbia, FPR Yugoslavia
- Citizenship: Serbian
- Party: Party for Democratic Action
- Occupation: professor, politician

Fatmir Hasani (Serbian Cyrillic: Фатмир Хасани; born 1957) is a politician in Serbia from the country's Albanian community. He served in the National Assembly of Serbia from 2016 to 2020 as a member of the Party for Democratic Action (Partija za demokratsko delovanje, PDD). During this time, Hasani was the only Albanian member of the Serbian parliament.

== Private life and career ==
Hasani was born in Bujanovac, then part of the People's Republic of Serbia in the Federal People's Republic of Yugoslavia. He became a chemistry professor in his home municipality after completing his education.

Hasani welcomed a visit by Serbian president Boris Tadić and Serbia and Montenegro cabinet minister Rasim Ljajić to his school in 2005, saying that it demonstrated the president's attention to education in multi-ethnic communities; a media report from this time described him as the school's headmaster.

== Politician ==
Hasani has been a prominent member of the PDD for several years. In 2002, he was identified in a news report as the party's local chairman in Bujanovac. Early in the following year, he addressed a rally that called for the release of seven Albanian protesters detained by state security forces, and he urged national and international authorities to uphold the 2001 Koncul agreement on demilitarization in the region.

Hasani received the tenth position on the electoral list of the Albanian Coalition of Preševo Valley (which included the PDD) in the 2012 Serbian parliamentary election. In the 2014 election, he received the fourth position on the PDD's list. He was not elected on either occasion.

He was given the first position on the PDD's list for the 2016 parliamentary election after party leader Riza Halimi chose not to stand as a candidate. During the campaign, he drew attention to the need for Albanians to be integrated into state institutions and called on the Serbian state to provide textbooks in the Albanian language and recognize degrees from the University of Priština. The PDD won a single parliamentary mandate and Hasani was accordingly elected. After the election, the party offered parliamentary support to prime minister Aleksandar Vučić's administration and took part in discussions about playing a role in government.

The PDD and Hasani's relationship with Vučić's government deteriorated in early 2017, after Serbian authorities attempted to send a train emblazoned with the words "Kosovo Is Serbia" to North Mitrovica in the disputed territory of Kosovo. In interviews during this period, Hasani called for the status of the Preševo Valley to be included in an upcoming dialogue between Serbia and Kosovo and highlighted problems with the Serbian police presence in Albanian communities.

Vučić subsequently reaffirmed his cooperation with the PDD following his election as president of Serbia in April 2017, and in June 2017 Hasani supported Vučić's nomination of Ana Brnabić to become Serbia's new prime minister. He announced the PDD's withdrawal of support for the Serbian government in September 2017, however, after Serbia dissolved the elected municipal assembly in Preševo. He added that the PDD could resume its support should the government change its position, though he noted that the party had not actually received anything in return for its previous support.

Hasani has stated that the vast majority of ethnic Albanians in the Preševo Valley would favour joining Kosovo via a territorial exchange with ethnic Serbian communities in the disputed province. He has acknowledged that any such exchange would require the support of the international community, and others in the region have rejected the idea as impracticable.

The PDD served in a parliamentary grouping with the Alliance of Vojvodina Hungarians until 2019, and Hasani was the group's deputy leader. In December 2019, he left this alliance to join a parliamentary group of the Liberal Democratic Party (LDP), the League of Social Democrats of Vojvodina (LSV), and the Party of Democratic Action of Sandžak (SDA). (The LSV subsequently withdrew from this group.) He was also a member of the parliamentary committee on education, science, technological development, and the information society; a deputy member of the committee on human and minority rights and gender equality; and a member of the parliamentary friendship group with Turkey.

He did not seek re-election in the 2020 Serbian parliamentary election.
