= Fatmir Efica =

Albanian sports journalist

Fatmir Efica (born 13 December 1961, in Kavajë) is an Albanian sports journalist and radio commentator. He is the long time play-by-play radio announcer of Besa Kavajë. Efica has also covered Albania National Football Team matches for Radio Tirana. In 2001 he was awarded the prestigious "Anton Mazreku Prize" from the National Association of Journalists. Efica has written columns for the sports dailies Sporti Shqiptar, Sportekspres and is the author of several books, most notably "Besa e Kavajës, një histori", which covers the history of the club from 1925-1995.
