= Agim Rada =

Albanian sculptor (1953–2023)

Agim Rada (24 May 1953 – 11 July 2023) was an Albanian sculptor.

== Biography ==
Rada was born in Tirana on 24 May 1953. His portfolio included statues sculpted in bronze for such figures as Marin Barleti, Gjergj Elez Alia, Onufri, and Petro Marko. One of his later works, the "Chained Cleric", was unveiled in the city of Shkodër days before Pope Francis' visit to Albania.

Rada died from lung disease on 11 July 2023, at the age of 70.
