= Fatmir Haxhiu =

Albanian painter

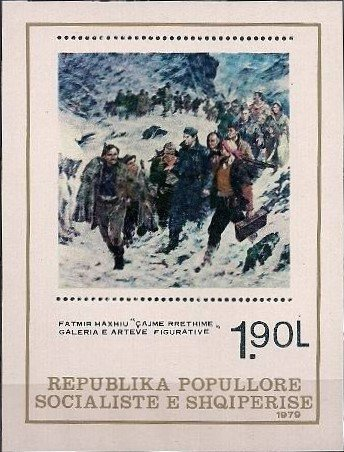
- Blow the Circle 1979 stamp, featuring an illustration by Haxhiu
- Born: 1927; Gjirokastër, Albania
- Died: 2001 (aged 73–74)
- Education: Qemal Stafa High School
- Occupation: Artist

Fatmir Haxhiu (1927 – 2001) was an Albanian painter of the 20th century born in Gjirokastër. Recipient of the People's Painter of Albania award, he belonged to the realist art stream.

Haxhiu studied at the Qemal Stafa High School.
