= Maks Velo =

Albanian painter (1935–2020)

- Born: 31 August 1935; Paris, France
- Died: 7 May 2020 (aged 84); Tirana, Albania
- Occupation: Painter

Maks Velo (31 August 1935 – 7 May 2020) was a French-born Albanian painter, journalist, and architect. His works have been exhibited in Europe and the United States.

== Biography ==
Velo wrote many essays related to the dictatorship of Enver Hoxha, who served from 1944 to 1985. He also published photo albums presenting his works, and illustrated works on the Albanian folk art and socialist realism.

Velo joined the Albanian League of Writers and Artists (ALWA) in 1969. Until the early 1970s, he designed and built hotels, schools, houses, movie theaters, and public parks in Tirana. He taught at the University of Arts in Tirana. In 1973, he was criticized for his sentiment in ALWA, and was accused of modernism at the 1975 Albanian national architecture congress.

=== Imprisonment and release ===
Velo was sentenced to 10 years' imprisonment in 1978 for "agitation and propaganda" against the Hoxha regime. Almost all of his paintings were then destroyed, and his art collections were either stolen or burned.

He was released from Spaç Prison in 1986, and was assigned to work in an abrasive stone factory in Tirana. In 1991, the Supreme Court of Albania heard his case and his criminal record was expunged. Since then, he had nearly forty exhibitions in his name in Albania, the United States, France, and Poland. He participated in exhibitions in Greece, Tunisia, and Italy. He lectured at the Minneapolis College of Art and Design, the University of Fine Arts in Poznań, Cornell University, and the Sapienza University of Rome.

Maks Velo died on 7 May 2020 in Tirana at the age of 84.
