= Agim Zajmi =

Albanian painter

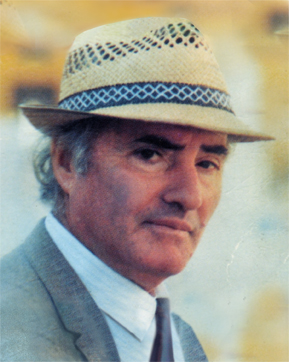
- Born: Agim Zajmi; 28 November 1936; Tirana, Albania
- Died: 3 November 2013 (aged 76); Tirana, Albania
- Known for: Painting
- Awards: Merited Artist; People's Artist of Albania

Agim Zajmi (28 November 1936 – 3 November 2013) was an Albanian painter. For his contribution to painting, he received the People's Artist of Albania medal.

- The most valued scenographer of the Albanian Theater (with over 300 scenographies)
- Distinguished Albanian painter (with about 800 artworks)
- Professor at the Academy of Arts in Tirana Albanian Academy of Belle Arts for 40 years
- President of the Nationwide Figurative Artists’ Association
- Recognitions and awards: People's Artist of Albania, Artist Emeritus, Professor

== Studies and teaching career ==
Zajmi was born on 28 November 1936, in Tirana, Albania. He completed his studies in painting, scenography-costumography at the Imperial Arts Academy of Saint Petersburg and graduated in 1961. In the same year he commenced working as a scenographer at the Opera and Ballet Theater of Tirana and later on worked mainly at the Tirana National Theater. He also worked very frequently with the national theaters of Prishtina in Kosova, of Shkup in Macedonia and of Montenegro. Zajmi participated in several international festivals of theater as a stage designer and painter.

From 1978, until his death Zajmi was a professor at the Academy of Music and Arts of Albania in Tirana. He was a professor and dean of The Albanian Academy of Belle Arts in Tirana.

In 1978, upon request of the Albanian Arts Academy, he founded the scenography studies program and took the chair at The Albanian Academy of Belle Arts in Tirana, where hundreds of future scenographers would study and graduate. He taught there for the next 40 years.

== Artworks ==
His artwork has been exhibited in many countries such as France, United Kingdom, Italy, Germany, Austria, Turkey, Greece, Egypt, etc. Forty of his paintings and scenography are part of the Tirana National Art Gallery collection and collections in other countries as well. Some of his artwork is currently exhibited at the Building of the Prime Ministry of Albania.

== National and international awards ==
He is the winner of many national awards in painting and scenography. For his artistic excellence and merit, he has been awarded:

- Winner of KULT Award 2008 - Best Scenographer of the Year
- First Prize Award in Painting for Kosova Field artwork - 1989
- First Prize Award in Scenography for the General of the Dead Army theatrical scenography, Kragujevac Festival - Prishtina 1976
- First Prize Award in Scenography for the Eugène Ionesco Rhinoceros theatrical scenography, Rajsburg Biennale - Poland 1996
- Naim Frasheri Medal Award -1968
- Second Prize Award in Painting for Vasil Laçi Portrait artwork - 1972
- Second Prize Award in Painting for Ganimet Tërbesha Portrait artwork - 1981
- Second Prize Award in Painting for Ded Gjo Luli Composition artwork - 1984
- Aleksandër Moisiu Award - 1997
- Merited Artist of Albania - Awarded in 1975
- People's Artist of the Republic of Albania - Awarded in 1991
- In 1995 he is awarded the title Professor with the motivation for services rendered to the people of Albania by teaching and enriching the Albanian social life with young painters and scenographers
- Forty of his paintings and scenographies are part of the national fund of the Albanian National Art Gallery

== His artistic-scientific creativity ==
He is the writer and editor of the "Issues of Scenography and its Components", a chapter in Theoretical Basis of the Figurative Arts book which is a textbook for the students of the Tirana Academy of Belle Arts.

Lecturer of many artistic and scientific thesis such as "The Development of Albanian Art" at the University of Algiers and "The Artwork of the Albanian Painter Vangjush Mio" in Ankara, Turkey.

He is the president of the Nationwide Figurative Artists’ Association with headquarters in Tirana, Albania. The association cooperates with Albanian artists from all ethnic Albanian territories (Kosova, Macedonia, Montenegro and Greece) as well as the Albanian Diaspora.

== National recognition ==
The impact and repercussion of Zajmi's artwork and artistic activity has been reflected in various books, interviews and documentary films broadcast on both the national and private TV channels.

- “A voice in the microphone”, Radio Tirana, Guest Agim Zajmi, 30 minutes -1995
- “Blue - with Agim Zajmi”, Klan TV, 120 minutes - 2004
- “The Theater is My Home” by Arben Minga, Albanian Radio Television, 1 hour - 2005
- “Profile - Agim Zajmi” on YouTube, Vizion+ TV, 30 minutes - November 2000
- “Exclusive Meeting” on YouTube, ALSAT TV, 1 hour - January 2008
- “Red Fish’s Escape” with Agim Zajmi, NEWS24 TV, 30 minutes - 2009
- “Agim Zajmi, the poet of scenography”, Monographic book by Kudret Velça. Biblio. P. 181-182 - L. 350 Tir.800. Classification 75 .054 .071.1(496.5)(092) 929(496.5) [Zajmi, Agim].

== See also ==
- List of Albanian painters
