= Nimon Lokaj =

Albanian painter

- Born: 1941 AD; Pobergja, Deçan, Kosova

Nimon Lokaj (born 7 December 1941 in Pobrde, near Deçan, Kingdom of Albania) is an Albanian painter. He graduated from the Academy of Fine Arts of Belgrade in 1969. After graduating taught figurative art in Deçan. His works have been widely exhibited in Kosovo, Yugoslavia and the rest of Europe during the 1970s and the 1980s. Currently he is a member of the Academy of Figurative Arts of Kosovo.

== Awards ==
Award name	Event	Date	Place
Kosova's December Prize	-	1979	Prishtina, Kosova
Mosa Pijade Prize	2nd Kosova Spring Salon	1976	Art Gallery, Prishtina, Kosova
The Prize of SRS Cultural and Educational Community	-	1974	Belgrade, Yugoslavia
The Prize of Biennial of Drawing	Biennial of Drawing	1974	Prishtina, Kosova
KAFA's Prize	-	1974	Prishtina, Kosova
The Prize of Bar's Museum	-	1970	Bar, Yugoslavia
YPA's Prize	-	1970	Podgorica, Yugoslavia
