= Gentian Lulani =

Albanian artist

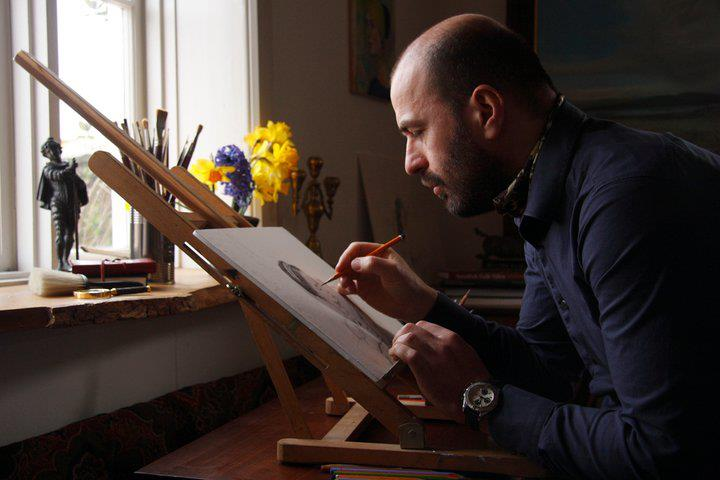
Gentian in his studio

Gentian Lulani, better known as Gentian (Shkoder, 1 December 1972) is an Albanian artist.

== Biography ==
Gentian Lulani was born in Shkoder, Albania in 1972. He grew up surrounded by the paintings of his uncle Ismail Lulani, a celebrated artist in Albania. The paintings, sketches, studies, and books in his childhood home encouraged Gentian to start drawing and painting at only 10 years old.

Later, he enrolled in the secondary School of Arts (Prenke Jakova) in his hometown of Shkoder and continued his studies in the Academy of Fine Arts in Tirana. At the age of 18 he went to study art in Rome. The 10 years he spent in Rome after his studies were thoroughly dedicated to the art of painting and to the intensive study of masterpieces from the Renaissance old masters. As well as his school studies, Gentian took private lessons in Rome and Florence.

After his move to Ireland in 2000, Gentian completed an Honours Degree in Art and Art History and Master in Fine Art at the Crawford College of Art and Design in Cork. Afterwards, he opened a studio and gallery on the grounds of Ballymaloe House in County Cork. His work has been exhibited successfully in solo and collective exhibitions throughout Ireland and mainland Europe. In 2006, he was accepted by the BP Awards of the National Portrait Gallery in London.

== Education ==
- Shkolla e Mesme Artistike "Prenke Jakova" Shkoder, Albania 1991
- Academia delle Belle Arte di Roma, Rome, Italy 1998
- BA Fine Art, Painting, Crawford College of Art and Design, Cork, Ireland 2006
- MA Master in Fine Art Crawford College of Art and Design, Cork, Ireland 2015

== Work ==
Gentian's art focuses on portraits, landscapes and drawings. He is inspired by the Pre-Raphaelite Brotherhood, and his landscapes have been influenced mostly by his uncle's work but also by Camille Corot, who has had a huge impact on him since he was 13-years-old. The artist has an interest in mythology and symbolism as reflected in some of his illustrations, drawings and compositions.

His painting process is influenced by life, memory and photography as well: all of Gentian's portraits are people that he knows and all his landscapes are places he has visited. Also the theme of migration appears in some of Gentian's works, due to the fact he has felt it on a personal level. These works express hope and tie migration to nature.

== Exhibitions ==
- National Portrait Gallery, London, United Kingdom (2006)
- Royal Academy of Arts, London, United Kingdom (2006)
- National Portrait Gallery, Scotland (2007)
- Parliament of Austria, Vienna, Austria (2011)
- Royal Hibernian Academy, Dublin, Ireland (2013)
