= Agim Sulaj =

Albanian painter

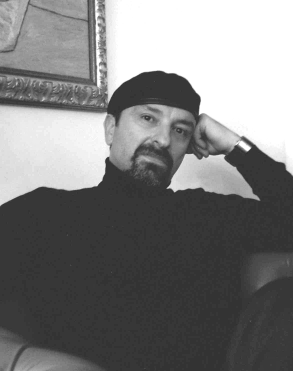
- Agim Sulaj
- Born: Agim Sulaj; 6 September 1960 (age 66); Vlora, Albania
- Education: Tirana School des Baux Artes
- Known for: caricaturist, illustrator, painter
- Notable work: The head of Ali Pasha, to Sultan (1989)
- Movement: Fine, surreal satirical illustration
- Website: www.agimsulaj.com

Agim Sulaj (born 6 September 1960, in Vlora, Albania) is an Albanian painter, living in Rimini, Italy since 1990 and having Italian citizenship.

== Biography ==
After high school, in 1978 Agim Sulaj entered the Tirana Academy des Baux Artes, and completed his studies at the Fine Arts Academy of Tirana in 1985. As a painter, he started working in the political and satirical magazine Hosteni, producing illustrations and caricatures. At the same time, he was developing the skill of hyperrealistic painting. He started to make his own works and he became famous by the Large scale oil paint "The Head of Ali Pasha Tepelena, presented to Sultan Mahmut II" (today the Museum of Ali pasha, Ioannina, Greece). Agim Sulaj won the 2010 edition of the "Cartoonsea" Italian national award for humor and satire, presided the jury in the 'CartoonSea 2011' edition and won second prize in the international competition "Brothers of Italy". His work has been called "a fine, surreal satirical illustration, metaphor for the state of the environment and the failure to protect it".

== Art activity ==
- 1979 - Winner of the special and encouragement reward at the traditional yearly competition of satire and humor organized by the Hosteni – Satire and Humor Magazine for the cartoon “Elegy”
- 1982 - Winner of the first prize at the traditional yearly competition of satire and humor organized by the Hosteni – Satire and Humor Magazine for the emblem of the “70th anniversary of the independence of Albania”
- 1984 - Winner of the third prize at the traditional yearly competition of satire and humor organized by the Hosteni – Satire and Humor Magazine for the caricature on the title page “ Assortment and the global”
- 1984 - Winner of the special reward at the competition in occasion of the 40th anniversary of the liberation of Albania organized by the High Institute of Fine Arts in Tirana for the cartoon “The man with two faces”
- 1985 - Graduate from the Fine Arts Academy of Tirana (Albania)
- 1986 - Winner of the first prize at the traditional yearly competition of satire and humor organized by Hosteni – Satire and Humor Magazine for the cartoon “My smoke over the all others”
- 1986 - First exhibition at the National Gallery in Tirana (Albania)
- 1988 - First prize in the Balkan Cartoon Prize “Man and Environment”, Seres (Greece)
- 1990 - Exhibition at the Greek National Museum “Ali Pashia”, Joanina, in the Lake Pamvotis Island (Greece)
- 1990 - Special prize "Aydin Dogan International Cartoon Competition" in Ankara (Turkey)
- 1992 - Personal exhibition at the “Meeting” event in Rimini (Italy)
- 1993 - Personal exhibition at the Town Hall in Brindisi (Italy)
- 1997 - Publication of some works in the collection “1997 Artists & Graphics Designers’ Market”, New York (US)
- 1998 - First prize in “Eurohumor”, Cuneo (Italy)
- 1998 - Personal exhibition at the Podesta Palace in Rimini (Italy)
- 1999 - Personal exhibition at the “Immagine Gallery” in Rimini (Italy)
- 1999 - Prize of honor to International cartoonist competition, Tolentino (Italy)
- 2000 - Collective exhibition at the Stefano Forni Gallery in Bologna (Italy)
- 2000 - Prize to the international competition "Omaggio a Charles Shulz" in Cuneo (Italy)
- 2001 - Exhibition in the Fregoso fortress in Sant’Agata (Italy)
- 2001 - Collective exhibition “ Europei Erranti” at the Forni’s Gallery in Bologna (Italy)
- 2002 - Exhibition at the Forni’s Studio, in Milan (Italy)
- 2002 - International Special Prize “Eurohumor”, in Cuneo (Italy)
- 2003 - Collective exhibition at the Forni’s Gallery, in Bologna (Italy)
- 2003 - Winner of two special prizes in the International Humoristic Art Festival in Tolentino (Italy)
- 2003 - Member of the international jury of the Special Competition about Europe, Cuneo (Italy)
- 2004 - Winner of the “Festival of Humor” in Cuneo (Italy)
- 2004 - Collective exhibition at the National Gallery in Tirana (Albania)
- 2004 - Personal exhibition at the National Gallery in Tirana (Albania)
- 2005 - Special Prize at the European Cartoon Competition "The painter’s house" (Belgio)
- 2005 - Personal exhibition at the Stefano Forni Gallery in Bologna (Italy)
- 2005 - Participated in the national manifestation about the figure of Albanian national hero Skenderbeu, by the National Gallery of Tirana and the Fine Art Gallery, Pristina (Kosovo)
- 2005 - Special Prize at the 23rd International Humoristic Art Festival, Tolentino (Italy)
- 2005 - Personal exhibition at the “Emigranti” Gallery, Tirana (Albania)
- 2006 - Musicarte – Collective exhibition at the Stefano Forni Gallery - Bologna (Italy)
- 2006 - Interazioni – Personal exhibition at the Palazzo Ducale di Podestà - Rimini (Italy)
- 2006 - Kosova Cartoon World
- 2006 - Prize Grand Prix with "Independence" - (Kosova)
- 2006 - International Competition Cartoonist Tourcoing
- 2006 - First prize with "Lo Straniero" - (France)
- 2006 - “Eurohumor” International Humoristic Art Festival “School, a teacher of life ?" - First Classified with "Nelle orme del padre" - Cuneo (Italy)
- 2007 - Best Entry of the European Union, Biennial international Kruishoutem - Belgium
- 2007 - Participated in the collective exhibition "Acqua" at the Forni Gallery, 4 May/30 June - Bologna (Italy)
- 2007 - Exhibition at "1° Uluslararasi Bursa Karikatur Bienali" - Bursa (Turkey)
- 2007 - His work "The pipe of uncle Norman" goes to become part of the museum dedicated to the big American painter Norman Rockwell in Stockbridge, Massachusetts (US)
- 2007 - Silver Medal, 2nd Biennial International Humoristic Graphics "Dulcinea", Tobozo (Toledo) - Spain
- 2007 - Special Prize at the International competition "Stuttgart Award" "Fascination Automobile", Stuttgart (Germany)
- 2007 - Special Prize – International Competition theme "Censorship" - Aachen (Germany)
- 2007 - Participated at collective exhibition "Premio Michetti" - 58° edizione - Francavilla al Mare, Chieti (Italy)
- 2007 - Participated at collective exhibition "Acqua" - Pavullo nel Frignano, Modena (Italy)
- 2007 - Prize of honor to 27th International Cartoon Competition " Nasradin Hodja" - Istanbul (Turkey)
- 2007 - First Prize, Bursa International Cartoon Competition Blue Gold "Water" - Bursa (Turkey)
- 2007 - Personal Exhibition, "Galleria D'Arte Stefano Forni" - Bologna (Italy)
- 2007 - Member of the international yuri "Black Cat" - Baku (Azerbaijan)
- 2007 - The best illustrations prize: Master Cup International Cartoon and Illustration - Beijing (China)
- 2007 - Participation in the collective exhibition "Artecento", Palace of the Governator, Cento - Ferrara (Italia)
- 2008 - "Future children" First international Cartoonnet Contest honorable mention Teheran - (Iran)
- 2008 - "The Dreamer" Personal Exhibition from National Gallery of Tirana - Albania
- 2008 - Awarded International competition in the "Cinema and Women" Izmir - Turkey
- 2008 - Special prize, International cartoon contest "Culture" - Damascus - Syria
- 2008 - Exhibition at the "Next Art Gallery" - Arezzo - Italy
- 2008 - First Prize, "1 Bienal de Humor Luis d'Oliveira Guimaraes" Penela - Portugal
- 2008 - Success Awards and International Cartoon Competition "Aydin Dogan", Istanbul - Turkey
- 2008 - Second Prize and International Cartoon Competition "Aydin Dogan", Istanbul - Turkey
- 2008 - Participant in the collective exhibition "Recall" Gallery of Art Stefano Forni, Bologna - Italy
- 2013 - Exhibitions 2 in United Kingdom
