= Saimir Strati =

Saimir Strati (born 1966) is an Albanian mosaic artist.

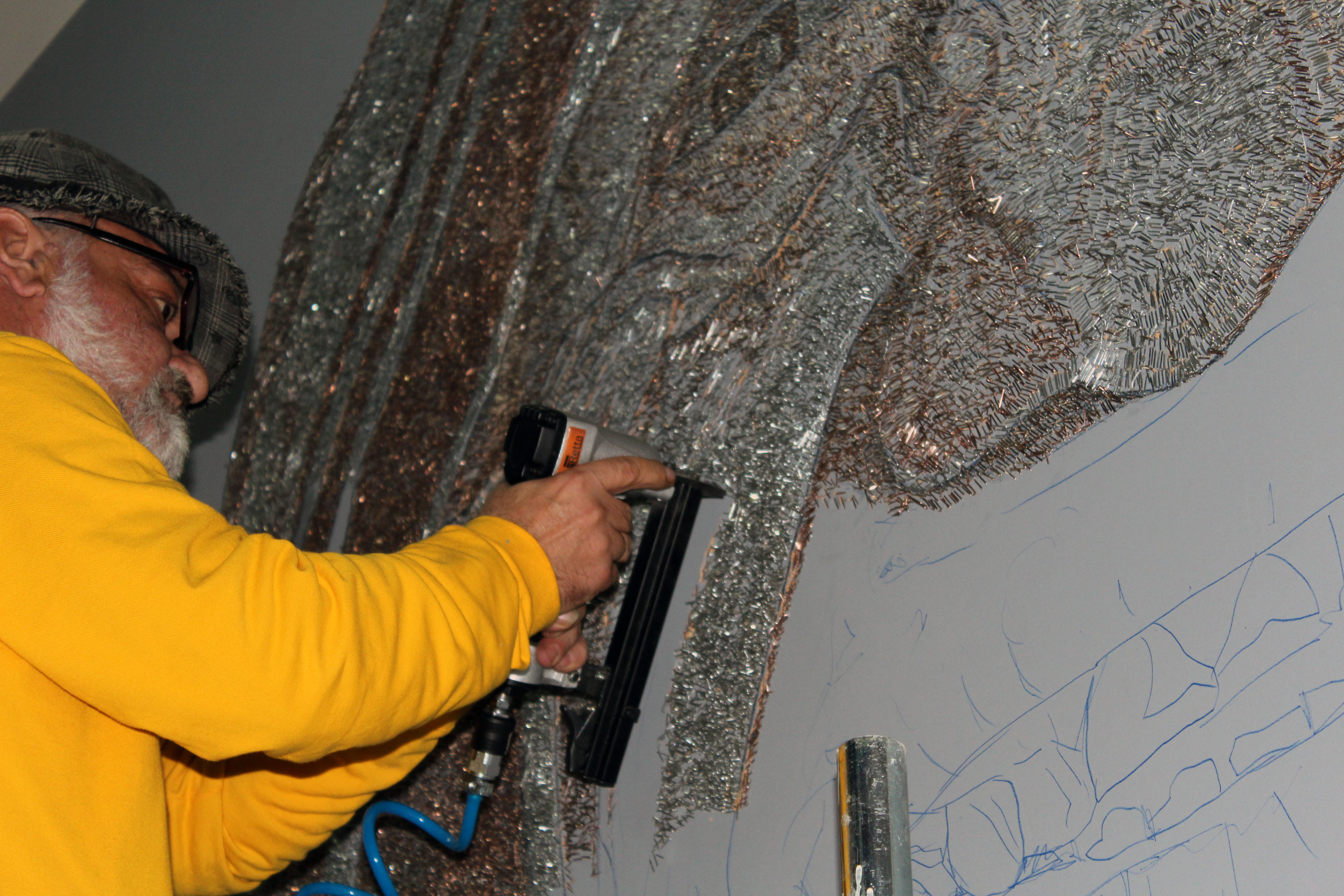
Saimir Strati

Strati was born in Tirana, Albania. He began his career doing restorations in Albania to several mosaics at the archeological sites of Byllis, Amantia and Apollonia. He is a member of the British Association of Modern Mosaic.

== Artworks ==
Strati is primarily a mosaic artist but is also a painter. He has used a variety of materials including from toothpicks to eggshells, compact discs and porcelain.

Strati is heavily inspired by music, and in the mosaic series 'The Four Seasons' based on the Vivaldi concerto, each season is represented by a different musical instrument. This series was created over the course of more than five years. Another work on oil depicts traditional Albanian Polyphonic singers. 'The King' is a portrait of Elvis Presley measuring nearly 2 metres in height and uses over 400 CD's.

His work 'Sea Girl' is based on a legend from Vlora, his hometown. The story is about a young woman separated from her lover. She prays to become a fish to cross the sea to reunite with him. The artwork itself is made from sea glass which took the artist several years to collect.

'Peace' is a quintessential work of the artist, where the mirror fragments used in the mosaic reflects the message of our relation to peace

== Guinness World Records ==
Strati has created a number of large mosaics, several of which have broken.[Guinness World Records|world records]:

- 2006 - Leonardo da Vinci

In 2006, Strati created a 2 by 4 metres (6 ft 7 in × 13 ft 1 in) self-portrait of Leonardo da Vinci using nearly 400 kg (880 lb) of nails. Resembling digital photography, each nail represented a pixel. It was confirmed as the world's largest nail mosaic, by Guinness World Records in Tirana on September 4, 2006.

- 2007 - Reinless Spirit

On July 26, 2007, Strati began a toothpick mosaic, over a 4 by 2 metres (13.1 ft × 6.6 ft) surface, to create the image of a horse. It was dedicated to Antonio Gaudi and was confirmed on September 4, 2007 as the world's largest toothpick mosaic. It was displayed at the Arbnori International Centre of Culture, Tirana, Albania. The mosaic used 1.5 million toothpicks.

- 2008 - Mediterraneana

On July 20, 2008, a deal was arranged with Sheraton Tirana and on August 8 the artist began a mosaic with a Mediterranean theme, consisting of 229,764 corks over a surface of 91.87m^{2}. The mosaic was completed over the course of 27 days at the Sheraton. An exhibition followed of both previous World Records as well as seven other artworks.

- 2009 - King of Pop :

In November 2009, Strati finished the largest paint brush mosaic, made all over Albania in every city and finished in the center of Tirana.

It was made in honor of Michael Jackson after his death.

- 2010 - Artists Banknote

For the Guinness World Record Day in November, Saimir Strati created the largest screw mosaic of a banknote. It was dedicated to artists all over the world. The mosaic has over 350000 screws and was finished in ten days.

- 2011 - One World, One Family, One Coffee

On September 4, 2011 the largest coffee bean mosaic in the world was Strati's sixth Guinness World Record. In this mosaic were five Characters, which each represented a continent. He used over One Million of coffee beans in this mosaic. On September 1, for the occasion of the 80th anniversary of the Albanian royal family, Prince Leka visited the exhibition. Albanian Minister of Foreign Affairs Lulzim Basha visited the exhibition on several occasions.

== Live performances ==
Every world record attempt Saimir Strati has attempted has been a live performance. He has also done a large scale artistic performance at Dubai's annual "One World, One Family, One Festival" (Dubai Shopping Festival).

The World's Largest Nail Mosaic and the World's Largest Toothpick Mosaic were created in the International Cultural Centre of Tirana. The World's Largest Cork Mosaic was created at Sheraton Tirana.

His audience has included Royalty, National leaders, politicians, business leaders, professional athletes and the general public from around the world.

== Exhibitions ==
- 1996 - Fier, Albania
- 2004 - Miss Globe International, Durrës, Albania
- 2005 - Fier, Albania
- 2006 - International Centre of Culture, Tirana, Albania
- 2006 - United States Embassy, Tirana, Albania
- 2007 - International Centre of Culture, Tirana, Albania
- 2008 - Sheraton Tirana Hotel and Towers, Tirana, Albania
- 2011 - July, Exhibition with the Apolon Colony
- 2011 - September, Exhibition with the Pogradec Colony
- 2011 - Art work in the museum Believe it or Not (USA)

== Recognition ==
In November 2009, Strati was decorated with the Honour of The Nation by the President of Albania.
