= Fatmir Agalliu =

Albanian academic

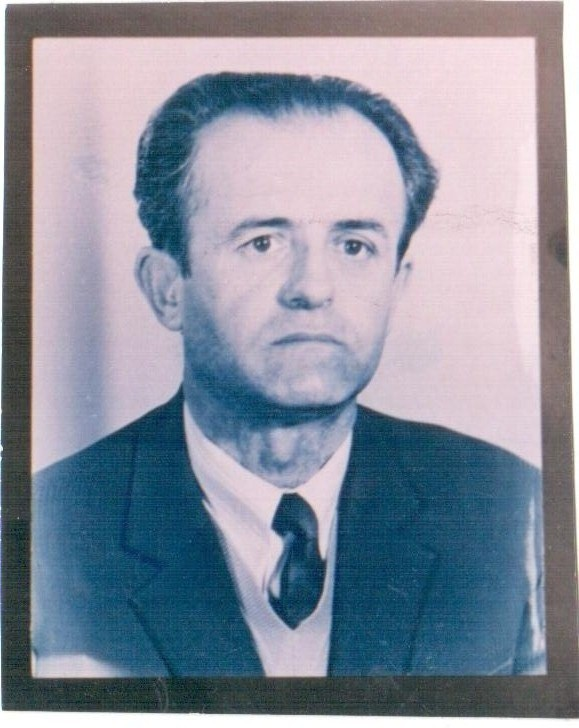
Fatmir Agalliu

Fatmir Agalliu (1933–1998) was an Albanian writer and linguist known for his analyses of the Albanian language.
