= Gjergj Zheji =

Gjergj Zheji (1926 – June 10, 2010) was an Albanian writer, translator, editor, sequence and folklore researcher, professor.

== Life ==
Gergj Zheji is the son of Spiro Ballo originally from Zhej of Zagoria and Theodora Petridhi. His father, a military officer educated in Italy during Albanian Kingdom, later promoted to Major-Colonel. Spiro Ballo was invited from Spiro Moisiu to take part in the resistance against the Germans. He was persecuted in the late 40s by the communist regime, and seized property in the Tirana.

Gjergj was graduated from "Qemal Stafa" High School and further he followed biennial Pedagogical Institute in Tirana. He worked as a teacher in "Petro Nini Luarasi" High School, editor on criticism sector of the "November" Magazine of the League of writers and Artists. Then as librettist in Theater of Opera and Ballet. Start working as a lecturer at the Faculty of History and Philology, as a professor and rector of the Academy of Fine Arts. He founded the publishing house "Plejad".

== Work ==
Zheji has made significant contributions in several areas, and was the first researcher who conducted a monograph on the life of Andon Zako Çajupi.

Among the literary works translated by George Zheji, mentioned "Rinoceronti" by Eugène Ionesco, "Tales of Tsar Sultan" by Alexander Pushkin, "Metaphysics of love" from Arthur Schopenhauer, "Existentialism is a humanism" of Jean-Paul Sartre, "Adventures of Huckleberry Finn" of Mark Twain, etc. He has given a great contribution to many anthology books of modern Albanian literature and, beyond, to Reading Literature.

== Publishing ==
- Muret e Krujës (Kruja Walls)
- Rusha
- Pupagjeli and his friends, with illustrations by Zef Bumçi.
- Fundamentals of Albanian sequence
