= Nexhmedin Zajmi =

Albanian painter and sculptor (1916–1991)

- Born: 4 March 1916; Trebisht, Peshkopi, Albania
- Died: 19 May 1991 (aged 75); Tirana, Albania
- Education: Tirana and Rome
- Known for: Painting and sculpture

Nexhmedin Zajmi (4 March 1916 – 19 May 1991) was an Albanian painter and sculptor.

== Early life and education ==
He was born in a village close to Trebisht, Peshkopi.

Zajmi studied at the Qemal Stafa High School in Tirana and in 1931 he graduated in agriculture from the technical school in Tirana, where he discovered his artistic talents.

The next phase of his education took place at art school, where he studied with sculptor Odhise Paskali.

In 1939, he went to study at the Academy of Fine Arts of Rome, in Rome, Italy, where he obtained his diploma in 1943. During the following year he remained in Italy, returning to Albania towards the end of 1944.

== Career ==
He initially worked as a teacher at a public school in Tirana, and soon moved to the Jordanian Mission's school for new artistic creation. He worked there until 1963, with a sabbatical during 1955 and 1956 when he held the role of director of the National Art Gallery of Albania in Tirana.

In 1963, he was made a teacher at Tirana's School of Fine Arts, where the first generation of Albanian painters was formed.

In the 1960s and 1970s, he also took advantage of the most successful 20th century artists. His works are included amongst the few works by Albanian artists which were seen by the people of Vienna, Zagreb and Sofia. He specialised in portraits of the inhabitants of the mountains in the north of Albania, as well as painting landscapes and other scenes.

In the 1980s, his failing health limited his production of art.

In 1961, he received the title of Honorable Painter (Albanian Piktor y Merituar), and in 1989 that of People's Artist of Albania (Piktor y Popullit).

There are 72 of Zajmiego's paintings in the National Art Gallery of Albania. An exhibition and retrospective of his art was opened on the 15th anniversary of his death, in March 2006.

== Death ==
He died, age 75, in Tirana.

== See also ==
- Art of Albania
- List of Albanian painters
- List of sculptors
