= Kristaq Rama =

Albanian sculptor and educator (1932–1998)

- Born: 31 July 1932; Durrës, Albanian Kingdom
- Died: 11 April 1998 (aged 65); Tirana, Albania
- Education: Jordan Misja Artistic Lyceum
- Occupations: Sculptor; art educator
- Political party: Party of Labour of Albania
- Spouse: Aneta Koleka
- Children: Edi and Olsi Rama
- Relatives: Zef Kolombi (uncle)

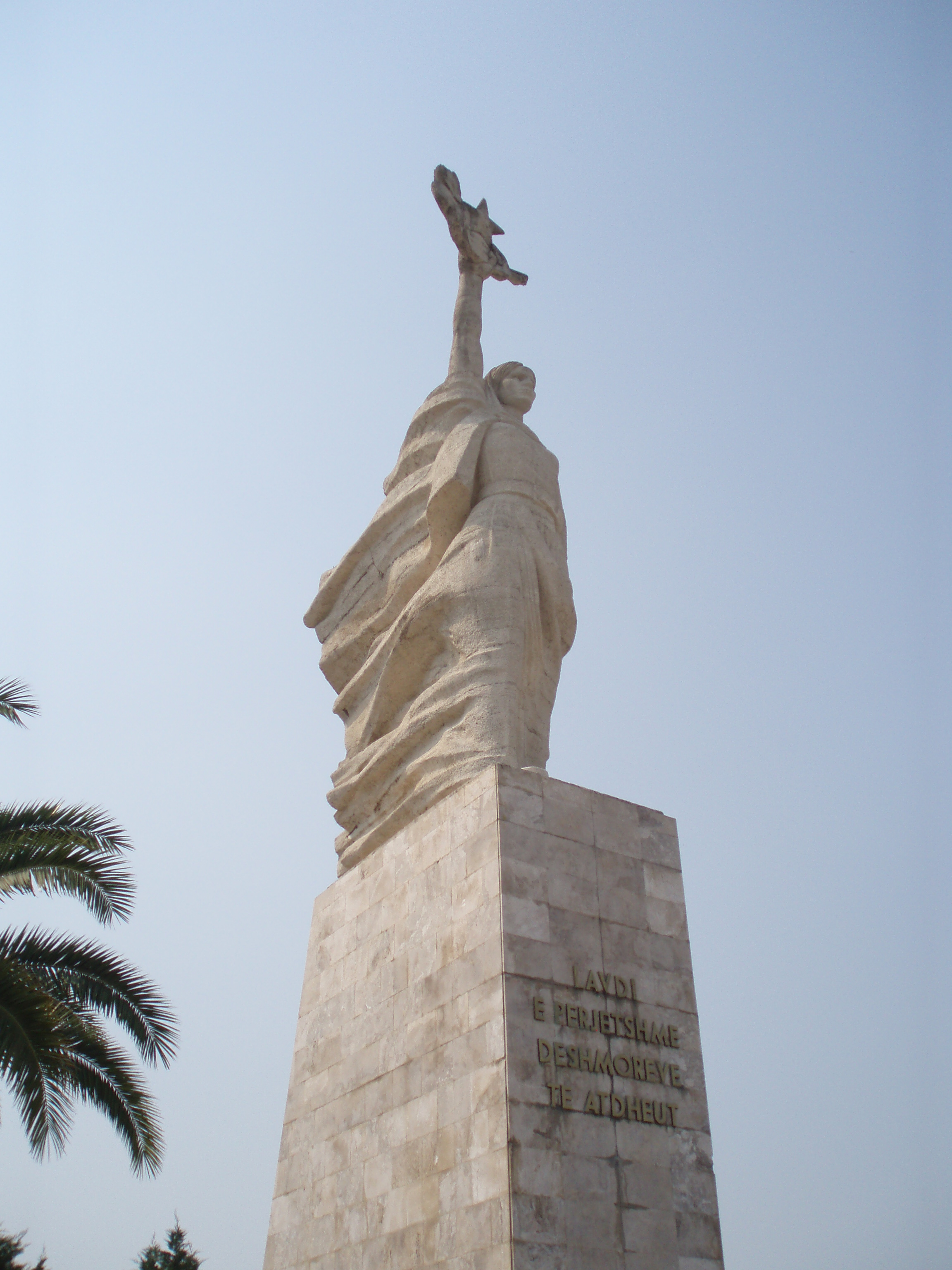
"Mother Albania", the partisan monument and graveyard on the outskirts of Tirana, Albania.

Kristaq Rama (Albanian pronunciation: [kɾisˈtac ˈɾama]; 31 July 1932 – 11 April 1998) was an Albanian sculptor, art educator and a member of the Party of Labour of Albania under Enver Hoxha's rule. He had close ties to Hoxha's regime. He was the father of current Albanian prime minister Edi Rama.

== Early life and education ==
He was born on 31 July 1932 in Durrës to Vlash Rama and Veronika Kolombi, sister of Zef Kolombi.

Rama graduated from the Jordan Misja Artistic Lyceum, in the Department of Fine Arts in 1951, and three years later left Albania to study in Leningrad, Soviet Union at the Leningrad Repin Academy of Arts.

== Career ==
After graduation, he returned to Albania, where he worked in Tirana, primarily as superintendent of fine arts at the Albanian Ministry of Culture, and at the same time taught as an external lecturer at the Higher Institute of Arts of Tirana.

As a sculptor, Rama created several busts of warriors, people portraits, female sculptures, as well as other decorations.

== Implication with communist dictatorship crimes ==
In August 1988, Rama signed – along with Ramiz Alia and others – documents for the death penalty of poet Havzi Nela by hanging. Other documents show that Rama signed for the death penalty for Enver Osmani, a 29-year-old from Dibër.

== Personal life ==
He was the father of Edi Rama, president of the Socialist Party of Albania and Prime Minister of Albania, also several times former mayor of Tirana.

Rama died on 11 April 1998, aged 65, after suffering a heart attack in Tirana.

== See also ==
- Art of Albania
- List of Albanians
- List of sculptors
