= Fatmir Musaj =

Albanian painter

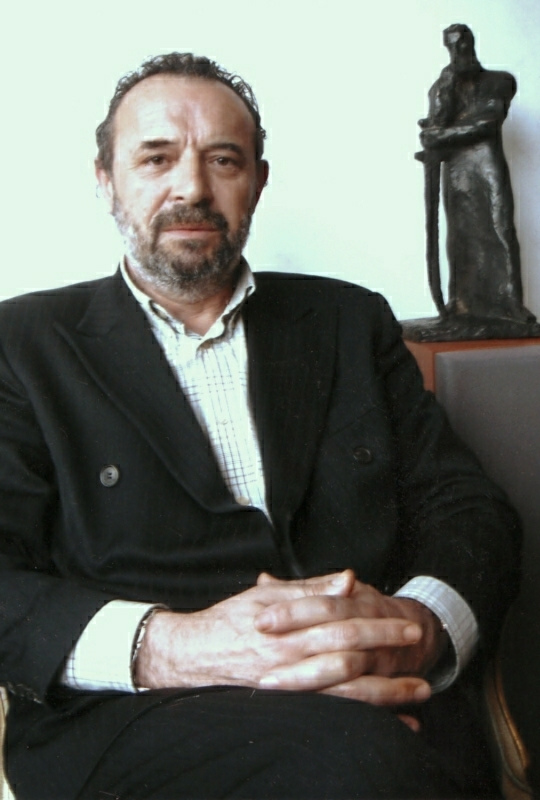
Fatmir Musaj

Fatmir Musaj (born 9 September 1958 in Kavajë) is an Albanian painter who served as Director of Albafilm.

== Exhibitions ==
1992 Personal Exhibition - National Museum of History, Tiranë
2003 Personal Exhibition - National Arts Gallery, Tiranë
