= Andrea Kushi =

Albanian painter

- Born: Andrea Kushi; 1884; Shkodër, Ottoman Empire
- Died: 1959 (aged 74–75); Tirana, Albania
- Education: Belgrade
- Known for: Painting
- Notable work: Portret vajze, Bariu me shkop

Andrea Kushi (1884–1959) was an Albanian painter. He was one of the most important representatives of the elder generation of Albanian painters.

== Life and work ==
Kushi was born in 1885 in Shkodër, where he spent his childhood and received his first art impulses through the paintings of the famous Albanian painter Kolë Idromeno. He studied Fine Arts between 1912 and 1914 in Belgrade, when he was forced to interrupt the lessons due to the outbreak of World War I. After the war he went back to Belgrade where he successfully completed his studies in 1920.

Kushi dedicated himself to the education of young painters. He moved back to Albania and became a teacher of Fine Arts at the Gymnasium of Elbasan, and later on moved to Tirana in 1931 and the same year he established the first drawing school in the country, which some months later in 1932 became the official Fine Arts School of Albania (Shkolla e vizatimit). Kushi was one of the organizers of the first national art exhibition in Albania, which took place in May 1931 at the Café Kursal in Tirana. The success of this exhibition led him and other painters to the creation of the Friends of the Arts Society (Shoqnia Miqt’ e Artit), which had as a primary goal the foundation of a national gallery. Between 1937 and 1943 he lived in Korçë where he was in contact with other known painters like Vangjush Mio and Foto Stamo. Kushi moved back to Elbasan in 1944 and later on in 1947 to Tirana, where he stayed until his death in 1959.

Kushi's focus was on Portraits and Landscape art. Very famous are the paintings Portret vajze (Portrait of a girl) and Bariu me shkop (Shepherd with a Staff).

The paintings of Kushi can be admired at the National Gallery of Figurative Arts of Albania in Tirana and at the galleries of Elbasan and Shkodër.
