= 2026 in Albania =

- Decades: 2000s; 2010s; 2020s
- See also: Other events of 2026; List of years in Albania

Events in the year 2026 in Albania.

== Incumbents ==
- President: Bajram Begaj
- Prime Minister: Edi Rama
- Deputy Prime Minister: Belinda Balluku (until February 26) Albana Koçiu (from February 26)

== Events ==
=== January ===
- January 8 – One person is killed while and thousands are affected in Durrës County after floods caused by heavy rainfall.
- January 12 – The Academy of Sciences of Albania publishes online an updated version of the Great Albanian Dictionary, including over 125.000 words, with a considerable upgrade from the versions of 1980 and 2002. The dictionary contains detailed definitions, usages, stylistic notes and terminology from various fields of knowledge.

=== February ===
- February 3 – Twenty people are arrested as part of an investigation into the trafficking of hazardous waste from Elbasan to Thailand in 2024.
- February 6 to 22 February – Albania at the 2026 Winter Olympics
- February 10 – Clashes between police and supporters of opposition leader Sali Berisha in Tirana result in 16 police officers injured and 13 arrests.
- February 20 – At least 30 people are arrested during anti-government protests in Tirana.

=== March ===
- 11 March – The constitutional court rules that the government's ban on TikTok violated constitutional protections for freedom of expression and press freedom, after authorities blocked the service in 2025 following a fatal stabbing linked to a dispute on the platform.

=== April ===
- 10 April – President Begaj issues a decree granting Albanian citizenship to former New York City mayor Eric Adams.

=== May ===
- 16 May – Albania in the Eurovision Song Contest 2026

=== June ===
- 2 June – Thousands of people gather in Tirana to protest against a development planned by Jared Kushner on the Adriatic coast that would intrude on environmentally protected areas of the Vjosa-Narta regions.
- 16 June – Archaeologists from the University of Warsaw and the University of Tirana discover the remains of a large Hellenistic temple in Bushat.

=== October ===
- 12 October — Foreign Minister Ferit Hoxha and Israeli Foreign Minister Gideon Sa'ar sign an enlarged government-to-government cooperation agreement.
- 13 October - Student Protests in Tirana turned violent, starting a new wave of protests against the government, calling for boycott and resigning of the Prime Minister Edi Rama.
- 26 October — Albania finalizes its agreement to join the International Stabilization Force in Gaza.

== Arts and entertainment ==
- List of Albanian submissions for the Academy Award for Best International Feature Film
- Tirana International Film Festival

== Holidays ==
- 1–2 January – New Year holidays
- 14 March – Day of summer
- 22 March – Nowruz Day
- 30 March – Eid al-Fitr
- 5 April – Catholic Easter Sunday
- 12 April – Orthodox Easter
- 1 May – Labour Day
- 6 June –The Day of Kurban Bayram
- 5 September – Saint Teresa's Consecration Day -
- 28 November – Flag and Independence Day
- 29 November – Liberation Day
- 8 December – National Youth Day
- 25 December – Christmas Day

== Deaths ==
- 31 January – Fitim Makashi, 81, actor (The Death of the Horse, Rrugicat që kërkonin diell, Nga mesi i errësirës).
- 5 May – Servet Pëllumbi, 89, speaker of parliament (2002–2005).
- 29 October – Luan Omari, 101, academic.
