= 2027 in Albania =

- Decades: 2000s; 2010s; 2020s
- See also: Other events of 2027; List of years in Albania

Events in the year 2027 in Albania.

== Incumbents ==
- President: Bajram Begaj
- Prime Minister: Edi Rama
- Deputy Prime Minister: Albana Koçiu

== Events ==
=== Scheduled ===
- 2027 Albania NATO summit
- 2027 Albanian local elections

== Arts and entertainment ==
- List of Albanian submissions for the Academy Award for Best International Feature Film
- Tirana International Film Festival

== Holidays ==
- 1–2 January – New Year holidays
- 9 March – Eid al-Fitr
- 14 March – Day of summer
- 22 March – Nowruz Day
- 28 March – Catholic Easter Sunday
- 1 May – Labour Day
- 2 May – Orthodox Easter
- 16 May –The Day of Kurban Bayram
- 5 September – Saint Teresa's Consecration Day -
- 28 November – Flag and Independence Day
- 29 November – Liberation Day
- 8 December – National Youth Day
- 25 December – Christmas Day
