= Bibliography of Albania =

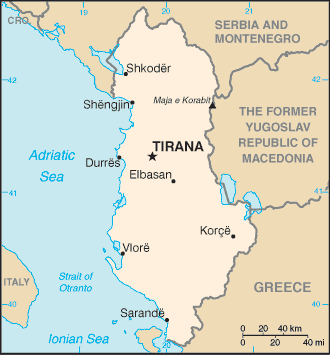
Albania

This is a list of books in the English language which deal with Albania and its geography, history, inhabitants, culture, biota, etc.

- Al-Halwaji, 'Abd Al-Sattar and Habib Allah 'Azimi – Catalogue of Islamic Manuscripts in the National Library of Albania, Tirana/Fihris makhtutat al-Islamiya bi Maktabat al-wataniya al-Albaniya fi Tirana.
- Almagia, Roberto – Albania.
- Barjaba, Kosta – Albania's Democratic Elections, 1991–1997: Analyses, Documents and Data.
- Bethell, Nicholas – Betrayed.
- Biberaj, Elez – Albania, A Socialist Maverick.
- Biberaj, Elez – Albania and China: A Study of an Unequal Alliance.
- Brewer, Bob – My Albania: Ground Zero.
- Demiraj, Bardhyl, ed. (2024). The Albanian Language Area and its Surroundings from Late Antiquity to the High Middle Ages: Proceedings of the 7th German-Albanian Cultural Studies Conference (21.-22. April 2023, Hubmersberg/Pommelsbrunn). Albanische Forschungen. Vol. 50. Harrassowitz Verlag. ISBN 9783447121644.
- Destani, Petjullah and Robert Elsie, eds. – Edward Lear in Albania: Journals of a Landscape Painter in the Balkans.
- Doja, Albert. 2000. "The politics of religion in the reconstruction of identities: the Albanian situation." Critique of Anthropology 20 (4): 421–438. doi=10.1177/0308275X0002000404.
- Doja, Albert. 2010. "Fertility trends, marriage patterns and savant typologies in Albanian context." Journal of Family History 35 (4): 346–367. doi=10.1177/0363199010381045.
- Doja, Albert. 2012. "The politics of religious dualism: Naim Frashëri and his elective affinity to religion in the course of 19th-century Albanian activism." Social Compass: International Review of Sociology of Religion 60 (1): 115–133. doi=10.1177/0037768612471770.
- Doja, Albert. 2015. "From the native point of view: An insider/outsider perspective on folkloric archaism and modern anthropology in Albania." History of the Human Sciences 28 (4): 44–75. doi=10.1177/0952695115594099.
- Durham, M. Edith – High Albania.
- Elsie, Robert – Historical Dictionary of Albania.
- The Films of the Third International Human Rights Film Festival Albania (HRFFA), 2008.
- Fischer, Bernd J. – Albania at War, 1939–1943.
- Fischer, Bernd J. and Oliver Jens Schmitt. A Concise History of Albania.
- Freedman, Robert Owen – Economic Warfare in the Communist Bloc: A Study of Soviet Economic Pressure Against Yugoslavia, Albania, and Communist China.
- Gardiner, Leslie – The Eagle Spreads His Claws: A History of the Corfu Channel Dispute and of Albania's Relations with the West, 1945–1965.
- Gawrych, George W. - The Crescent and the Eagle, Ottoman Rule, Islam and the Albanians, 1874–1913.
- Gilkes, O. J., A. M. Liberati, L. Miraj, I. Pojani, F. Sear, J. Wilkes, and B. Polci – The Theatre at Butrint. Luigi Maria Ugolini’s Excavations at Butrint 1928-1932 (Albania Antica IV).
- Gordon, Jan and Cora J. Gordon – Two Vagabonds in Albania.
- Griffith, William E. – Albania and the Sino-Soviet Rift.
- Hall, Derek – Albania and the Albanians.
- Hasluck, Margaret and J. H. Hutton – The Unwritten Law in Albania.
- Hoffman, George W. – Regional Development Strategy in Southeast Europe: A Comparative Analysis of Albania, Bulgaria, Greece, Romania, and Yugoslavia.
- Hutchings, Raymond – Historical Dictionary of Albania.
- Hyman, Susan – Edward Lear in the Levant: Travels in Albania, Greece and Turkey in Europe, 1848–1849.
- Information Department of The Royal Institute of International Affairs – The Balkan States: 1. Economic. A Review of the Economic and Financial Development of Albania, Bulgaria, Greece, Roumania and Yugoslavia Since 1919.
- Knowlton, Mary Lee – Albania.
- Kola, Paulin – The Myth of Greater Albania.
- Kondis, Basil – Greece and Albania, 1908–1914.
- Kontos, Joan Fultz – Red Cross, Black Eagle: A Biography of Albania's America School.
- Lloyd, A. L. – Folk Music of Albania.
- May, Jacques M. – The Ecology of Malnutrition in Five Countries of Eastern and Central Europe (East Germany, Poland, Yugoslavia, Albania, Greece).
- Murzaku, Inez A. – Catholicism, Culture, Conversion: The History of the Jesuits in Albania (1841–1946).
- Murzaku, Inez Angeli – Returning Home to Rome: The Basilian Monks of Grottaferrata in Albania.
- Myrdal, Jan and Gus Kessle – Albania Defiant.
- Newbigin, Marion I. – Southern Europe: A Regional and Economic Geography of the Mediterranean Lands (Italy, Spain, Portugal, Greece, Albania, and Switzerland).
- Pano, Nicholas C. – The People’s Republic of Albania.
- Pano, Nicholas C. – The Republic of Albania.
- Peacock, Wadham – Albania, the Founding State of Europe.
- Pettifer, James – Blue Guide Albania.
- Pipa, Arshi and Sami Repishti, ed. – Studies on Kosova.
- Prifti, Peter – Socialist Albania since 1944.
- Sjoeberg, Oerjan – Rural Change and Development in Albania.
- Skendi, Stavro – Albania.
- Szajcowski, Bogan – Marxist Governments: A World Survey: Vol. 1, Albania- The Congo; Vol. 2, Cuba-Mongolia; Vol. 3, Mozambique-Yugoslavia.
- Tarifa, Fatos and Max Spoor – The First Decade and After: Albania’s Democratic Transition and Consolidation in the Context of Southeast Europe.
- Thomas, John I. – Education and Communism: School and State in the People's Republic of Albania.
- Vickers, Miranda and James Pettifer – Albania: From Anarchy to a Balkan Identity.
- Winnifrith, Tom – Perspectives on Albania.
- Winnifrith, Tom – Nobody's Kingdom: A History of Northern Albania.
- Young, Antonia – Albania.
