= Historiography of Albania =

Methodology in Albanian history studies

The Historiography of Albania (Albanian: Historiografia e Shqipërisë) or Albanian historiography (Albanian: Historiografia shqiptare) refers to the studies, sources, critical methods and interpretations used by scholars to study the history of Albania and Albanians.

== Influence of Germany and Austria-Hungary ==
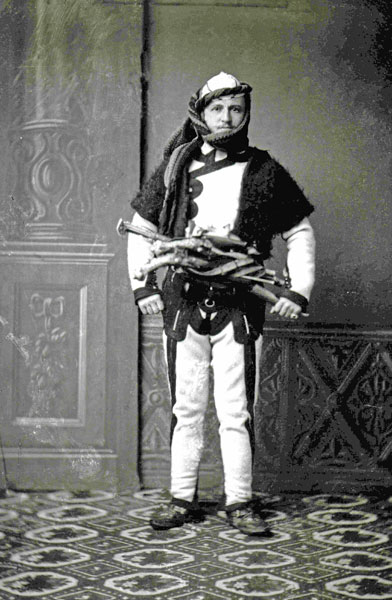
Theodor Ippen in Shkodër wearing a northern Albanian costume

Theodor Anton Ippen, who would become a consul of Austria-Hungary in Scutari between 1897 and 1903, belonged to the group of Albanologists whose works were published through the state-financed institutes of Austria-Hungary. He was involved in writing and disseminating the first history of Albania published in the Albanian language, arguing it would be beneficial for the awakening of the Albanian national consciousness and therefore serve Austria-Hungary's interests in the area. Ippen advocated for the establishment of an independent nation-state of Albanians.

== Modern Albanian historiography ==
There are two main sources of modern Albanian historiography: intellectuals from the Albanian National Awakening (Rilindja) period and historians from the regime of the People's Socialist Republic of Albania. From 1878 onward, the National Awakening period galvanised Albanian intellectuals, some of whom emerged as the first modern Albanian scholars and were preoccupied with overcoming linguistic and cultural differences between Albanian subgroups (Gegs and Tosks) and Muslim and Christians. At that time, these scholars lacked access to many primary sources to construct the idea that Albanians were descendants of Illyrians, while Greater Albania was not considered a priority. Compared with their Balkan counterparts, these Albanian historians were very moderate and alongside politicians mainly had the goal to get socio-political recognition and autonomy for Albanians under Ottoman rule. Two major historical works written by Albanians during this early phase of modern historiography within Albania are Athanase Gegaj's L'Albanie et l'Invasion turque au XVe siècle (1937) and Fan Noli's George Castrioti Scanderbeg (1405-1468) (1947), both written outside Albania.

=== Albanian socialist historiography (1945-1992) ===
Albanian socialist historiography was associated with the Albanian state-building project of national legitimation. Albanian historiography was based upon the works of a group of Albanian-speaking intelligentsia that during the early-to-mid 19th century developed a national narrative when professional Albanian historians did not exist. Balanced approaches to history were not encouraged during the period between the end of World War II and the death of Enver Hoxha in 1985. After the Second World War the communist government trained scholars to become historians and write Albanian history, while due to the political context they were preoccupied with matters relating to national identity. In 1959, the first volume on the history of Albania was published that dealt with topics ranging from antiquity until the 19th century and was a major undertaking that was a serious analysis of Greek, Latin, Byzantine and Ottoman sources. Elements of national construction dominated parts of the work such as stressing the Illyrians as the ancestors of the Albanians, the existence of an Albanian medieval state and that Albanians during the Ottoman period were an autonomous entity. These themes though linked to matters of national identification were not completely unfounded. During the communist period, the regime attempted to instil a national consciousness through the scope of a teleological past based upon Illyrian descent, Skanderbeg's resistance to the Ottomans and the nationalist reawakening (Rilindja) of the 19th and early 20th centuries. Those themes and concepts of history have still continued within a post-communist environment modified and adapted to fit contemporary Albania's aspirations regarding Europe. Albanian historiographical scholarship though compromised by political influences did manage to produce reliable information at times. Of Stalinist Albania, Bernd Jürgen Fischer stated that it produced good historians though not always good history. Drawing upon themes of national struggles established during the Rilindja period, Albanian socialist historiography centred itself upon the main narrative of nationhood that within history writing included Marxist historical materialism and nationalism. There were two main notable groups of Albanian historians in that period:

1. Military historians: Ndreci Plasari and Shyqri Ballvora
2. Political historians: Aleks Buda, Stefanaq Pollo, Arben Puto and Luan Omari.

Aleks Buda, who also became President of the Academy of Sciences of Albania, is sometimes considered as a founder of the Albanian post-WWII historiography. Buda belonged to a small group of intellectuals allowed by the Albanian communist regime to have access to foreign literature in order to use them to prepare new ideological and theoretical directives for the rest of their colleagues.

=== Post-communist Albanian historiography ===
When Albanian socialist historiography dealt with people, it tended to see things black and white. The legacy of understanding history through such dichotomies has remained for a majority of Albanians which for example they view Skanderbeg and the anti-Ottoman forces as "good" while the Ottomans are "bad". The influence of ideology upon Albanian historians during the socialist era of Albanian Historiography can be seen not only in publications published by Academy of Sciences of Albania (i.e. Historia e Shqipërisë) but also in specialized works published by individual authors like Viron Koka, Mentar Belegu and Ilijaz Fishta. Due to that legacy, Robert Elsie emphasized that there was no reliable and objective historiography in Albania which could serve as a basis for his historical dictionary of Albania he compiled and published in 2010. Oliver Jens Schmitt stated that the post-World War II Albanian regime propagated the official version of the past using all available means. People in Albania were subjected to state organized indoctrination and propaganda. Schmitt explained that because of political influence it was impossible to organize open discussion about socialist historiography, while those who attempted to criticize it would be denounced often as non-professionals or foreigners with evil objectives. The influence of such historical myths still remain which for example in 2009 Schmitt was severely criticised in Albania after producing an academic biography that challenged the traditional Albanian concept of Skanderbeg. Post-communist Albanian historiography has attempted to move away from previous political influences of the Hoxha era and shift the discipline toward a more scientific methodological direction, however, themes of national struggles continue. Political pressures have been placed upon contemporary Albanian historiography. For example, the Albanian government in 2013 reformed the Academy of Sciences by allowing it to influence the scholarship of historians by urging them to rewrite history (mostly in relation to the modern period). Those moves caused heated debate among historians of which one group viewing the initial intent as being a move to place aside distortions of the past that assisted in empowering the communists and another seeing it as a repeat of the communist regime's politicisation of history.

== Themes ==
=== Early Albanian history ===
The picture created by Albanian science about the early history of Albanians is simplified, uncritical and has appearances of fabrication. Albanian scholars have continuously asserted and claimed antecedence of Albanian culture over Slav culture. The official Albanian historiography, which influenced many Albanians, emphasizes that Albanians have always lived in Albania and supports the hypothesis that Albanians are descendants of Illyrians, while some non-Albanian scholars consider the question of the origin of Albanians to be unsolved.

=== Ottoman period and Islam in Albania ===
The image of Islam produced by both main sources of modern Albanian historiography was neither objective nor positive. Although the communist regime fell (1992) in Albania, contemporary Albanian historians have still held onto inherited stereotypes and myths regarding Islam from Albanian socialist historiography.

Albanian historiographical myths regarding Islam include:

1. Islam was imported by the Ottomans and is an alien element of Albanian culture.
2. Albanians converted from Christianity to Islam not because of their religious feelings though instead for other opportunistic reasons or because they were sometimes forced to do so.
3. Albanian religious sentiments are weak because Albanian national feeling was always more important for Albanians than their religious adherence and affiliations.

Numerous historians from Albania with nationalist perspectives (Ramadan Marmallaku, Kristo Frasheri, Skender Anamali, Stefanaq Pollo, Skender Rizaj and Arben Puto) intentionally emphasized "the Turkish savagery" and "heroic Christian resistance against the Osmanli state in Albania". Albanian historiography tends to ignore religiously inspired enmity between Albanians of different faiths. Nationalist interpretations dating from the Communist era, which interpret Ottoman rule as being the "yoke" period, persist akin to other Balkan historiographies.

=== Skanderbeg ===
Although the Myth of Skanderbeg had little to do with the reality of historical Skanderbeg, it was incorporated in works about history of Albania.

=== Treaty of London ===
The Treaty of London interpreted by nationalist Albanian historiography symbolizes the partition of the Albanian nation into three parts.

=== Other ===
The Serbian argument that Kosovo was first settled by the Albanians in the 17th century is rejected by modern Albanian historiography.

== Sources ==
- Bartl, Peter (2001) [1995], Albanci : od srednjeg veka do danas (in Serbian), translated by Ljubinka Milenković, Belgrade: Clio, ISBN 9788671020176, OCLC 51036121
- Brisku, Adrian (2013). Bittersweet Europe: Albanian and Georgian Discourses on Europe, 1878–2008. New York: Berghahn Books. ISBN 9780857459855.
- Dhrimo, Ali. “Der Beitrag deutscher Forscher auf dem Gebiet des Albanischen”, in Albanien in Vergangenheit und Gegenwart: Internationales Symposion der Südosteuropa-Gesellschaft in Zusammenarbeit mit der Albanischen Akademie der Wissenschaften, Winterscheider Mühle bei Bonn, 12. bis 15. September 1989. Edited by Klaus-Detlev Grothusen. Munich, 1991, pp. 160–172.
- Di Lellio, Ana (2009). "The battle of Kosovo 1389." An Albanian epic. London: IB Tauris. ISBN 9781848850941.
- Kopanski, Atuallah Bogdan (1997). "Islamization of Albanians in the Middle Ages: The primary sources and the predicament of the modern historiography". Islamic Studies. 36 (2/3): 191–208.
- Jürgen Fischer, Bernd (1999), Albania at war, 1939-1945, West Lafayette, Ind.: Purdue University Press, ISBN 9780585063881, OCLC 42922446
- Kressing, Frank; Kaser, Karl (2002), Albania--a country in transition : aspects of changing identities in a South-East European country (PDF), Baden-Baden: Nomos, ISBN 9783789076701, OCLC 50737195
- Schmidt-Neke, Michael (2014). "A burden of Legacies: The transformation of Albanian's political system". In Pichler, Robert (ed.). Legacy and Change: Albanian Transformation from Multidisciplinary Perspectives. Münster: LIT Verlag. pp. 13–30. ISBN 9783643905666.
- Schwandner-Sievers, Stephanie; Jürgen Fischer, Bernd (2002), Albanian identities: myth and history, USA: Indiana University Press, ISBN 978-0-253-34189-1
- Elsie, Robert (2004). Songs of the frontier warriors. Bolchazy-Carducci Publishers. ISBN 978-0865164123.
- Elsie, Robert (2010), Historical dictionary of Albania, Lanham: Scarecrow Press, ISBN 9780810873803, OCLC 454375231
