= Independence Cup (Albania) =

Independence Cup Kupa Pavarësia
- Founded: 2009
- Region: Balkans
- Number of teams: 4 (2010–); 3 (2009)
- Current champions: (North Macedonia) Struga (2nd title)
- Most successful club(s): (North Macedonia) Struga (2 titles)
- 2018 Independence Cup (Albania)

The Independence Cup (Albanian: Kupa Pavarësia) is an annual friendly football tournament held in Albania on 28 November to commemorate Albanian Independence Day. The tournament took place in Vlorë between 2009 and 2015, in Tirana in 2016 and in Korçë in 2017. Clubs from Albania, Kosovo, North Macedonia and Montenegro have taken part in the tournament. Since the 2019 Albania earthquake the tournament has not been held anymore.

== Winners ==
Season	Winner	Final Score	Runner-up	Venue	Date	Ref.
2009	(Albania) Flamurtari	Group format	(North Macedonia) Shkëndija	(Albania) Flamurtari Stadium, Vlorë	28 November 2009	
2010	(North Macedonia) Renova	1–0	(Montenegro) Otrant	(Albania) Flamurtari Stadium, Vlorë	28 November 2010	
2011	(Kosovo) Hysi	0–0 (3–0 p.)	(North Macedonia) Shkëndija	(Albania) Flamurtari Stadium, Vlorë	28 November 2011	
2012	(North Macedonia) Shkëndija	0–0 (5–3 p.)	(Kosovo) Prishtina	(Albania) Flamurtari Stadium, Vlorë	28 November 2012	
2013	(Kosovo) Prishtina	0–0 (8–7 p.)	(Albania) Flamurtari	(Albania) Flamurtari Stadium, Vlorë	28 November 2013	
2014	(Kosovo) Feronikeli	1–0	(North Macedonia) Shkëndija	(Albania) Flamurtari Stadium, Vlorë	28 November 2014	
2015	(Montenegro) Otrant	3–0	(Albania) Partizani B	(Albania) Flamurtari Stadium, Vlorë	28 November 2015	
2016	(Albania) Kukësi	2–0	(Kosovo) Prishtina	(Albania) Selman Stërmasi Stadium, Tirana	28 November 2016	
2017	(North Macedonia) Struga	0–0 (4–1 p.)	(Montenegro) Otrant	(Albania) Skënderbeu Stadium, Korçë	28 November 2017	
2018	(North Macedonia) Struga	1–0	(Montenegro) Otrant	(Albania) Skënderbeu Stadium, Korçë	28 November 2018	

== Editions ==
=== 2009 ===
Matches
Team 1	Score	Team 2
(Albania) Flamurtari	0–0 (11–10 p.)	(North Macedonia) Shkëndija
(North Macedonia) Shkëndija	5–4 (11–10 p.)	(Kosovo) Prishtina
(Kosovo) Prishtina	0–0 (2–3 p.)	(Albania) Flamurtari

Pos	Team	Pld	W	L	GF	GA	GD	Pts
1	(Albania) Flamurtari	2	2	0	0	0	0	6
2	(North Macedonia) Shkëndija	2	1	1	0	0	0	3
3	(Kosovo) Prishtina	2	0	2	0	0	0	0

Updated to match(es) played on unknown. Source:

=== 2010 ===
Semifinals
(Albania)	Besa	0 (4)
(North Macedonia)	Renova (pen.)	0 (5)
(Montenegro)	Otrant (pen.)	0 (?)
(Kosovo)	Liria	0 (?)

Final
(North Macedonia)	Renova	1
(Montenegro)	Otrant	0

=== 2011 ===
Semifinals
(North Macedonia)	Shkëndija (pen.)	0 (3)
(Montenegro)	Otrant	0 (1)
(Albania)	Flamurtari	0 (3)
(Kosovo)	Hysi (pen.)	0 (4)

Final
(North Macedonia)	Shkëndija	0 (0)
(Kosovo)	Hysi (pen.)	0 (3)

=== 2012 ===
Semifinals
(Albania)	Tirana	0
(North Macedonia)	Shkëndija	1
(Albania)	Flamurtari	1 (?)
(Kosovo)	Prishtina (pen.)	1 (?)

Final
(North Macedonia)	Shkëndija (pen.)	0 (5)
(Kosovo)	Prishtina	0 (3)

=== 2013 ===
Semifinals
(Albania)	Flamurtari	2
(Montenegro)	Federal	0
(North Macedonia)	Shkëndija	2 (2)
(Kosovo)	Prishtina (pen.)	2 (4)

Final
(Albania)	Flamurtari	0 (7)
(Kosovo)	Prishtina (pen.)	0 (8)

=== 2014 ===
Semifinals
(Albania)	Flamurtari	0
(North Macedonia)	Shkëndija	1
(Kosovo)	Llamkos Kosova	0 (1)
(Kosovo)	Feronikeli (pen.)	0 (3)

Final
(North Macedonia)	Shkëndija	0
(Kosovo)	Feronikeli	1

=== 2015 ===
Semifinals
(Montenegro)	Otrant	1
(North Macedonia)	Shkëndija	0
(Albania)	Partizani B	1
(Kosovo)	Feronikeli	0

Final
(Montenegro)	Otrant	3
(Albania)	Partizani B	0

=== 2016 ===
Semifinals
(Montenegro)	Otrant	0
(Kosovo)	Prishtina	1
(North Macedonia)	Shkëndija	1
(Albania)	Kukësi	3

Final
(Kosovo)	Prishtina	0
(Albania)	Kukësi	2

=== 2017 ===
Semifinals
(Kosovo)	Liria	1
(Montenegro)	Otrant	2
(Albania)	Tirana	0
(North Macedonia)	Struga	1

Final
(Montenegro)	Otrant	0 (1)
(North Macedonia)	Struga (pen.)	0 (4)

=== 2018 ===
Semifinals
(Montenegro)	Otrant	0 (6)
(Kosovo)	2 Korriku	0 (5)
(North Macedonia)	Struga	1
(Albania)	Skënderbeu	0

Final
(Montenegro)	Otrant	0
(North Macedonia)	Struga	1

== Statistics ==
=== Performance by team ===
Team	Winner	Runner-up	Tournaments
(Albania) Besa	—	—	1
(Montenegro) Federal	—	—	1
(Kosovo) Feronikeli	1	—	2
(Albania) Flamurtari	1	1	5
(Kosovo) Hysi	1	—	1
(Kosovo) 2 Korriku	—	—	1
(Albania) Kukësi	1	—	1
(Kosovo) Llamkos Kosova	—	—	1
(Kosovo) Liria	—	—	2
(Montenegro) Otrant	1	3	6
(Albania) Partizani B	—	1	1
(Kosovo) Prishtina	1	2	4
(North Macedonia) Renova	1	—	1
(Albania) Skënderbeu	—	—	1
(North Macedonia) Shkëndija	1	3	7
(Albania) Tirana	—	—	2
(North Macedonia) Struga	2	—	2

=== Performance by country ===
Team	Winner	Runner-up
Albania	2	2
Kosovo	3	2
North Macedonia	4	3
Montenegro	1	2

== See also ==
- Albanian Declaration of Independence
