= Shundi =

Shundi or Shun Di may refer to:

- Shundi (fictional kingdom), a fictional kingdom in Goopy Gyne Bagha Byne
- Shundi (surname), an Albanian surname
- Shun Di, a character from Virtua Fighter
- Emperor Shun (disambiguation) or Shundi in Chinese
