= Stefanaq Pollo =

Albanian academic, professor and historian

Stefanaq Pollo (March 7, 1924 – May 15, 1997) was an Albanian academic, professor and historian during Communist Albania.

== Biography ==
Pollo was born in Përmet, in a family originating in Frashër region. He was also a novelist and member of the Albanian organization "Vatra" which fought for the independence of Albania. Pollo graduated from elementary with high grades due to getting the education from his parents as well, and he developed an interest in science. He was distinguished for natural wisdom and willingness to learn from school in Përmet, and continued with high grades in the French Lyceum in Korçë. Here he studied history, literature and the Albanian language, as well as scientific formulation, interpretation and evaluative skills.

When the invasion by Fascist Italy began on April 7, 1939, he was forced to interrupt his studies. This motivated him to emerge in the first anti-fascist protests in Korça and later in the National Liberation Antifascist Movement. Through the battles of war against the fascists, he directed the newspaper "Kushtrimi i Lirisë" (War cry of Freedom) and "Zëri i Rinisë" (The voice of the young). He also studied history in the Soviet Union. After World War II, he became the editor in chief of the Bashkimi (The Union). After the liberation, he withdrew from politics and continued with his scientific endeavours and studied history in Lomonosov University in the years of 1945, graduating with high results. He began teaching at the Institute of Tirana in 1950–1951.

In the years of 1951–1957, he continued his post as vice-president of the Institute of Sciences. With the establishment of the University of Tirana in 1957, he was appointed the first Dean of the faculty of history and philosophy. From 1972 to 1989 he was director of the Institute of History of the Academy of Sciences of Albania. He was also the coauthor of the standard History e Popullit Shqiptar (History of the Albanian people, Tirana, 1966–1967) and Historia e Shqiperisë (History of Albania, Tirana, 1983–1984). He was responsible for the French-language Histoire de l'Albanie des origines a nom jours (Roanne, 1974), translated as "History of Albania from its Origins to Present day" (London, 1981).

During the Albanian Academy of Sciences, professor Pollo has entitled a seat in the committee. He was also a member of the principals of the academy of science and also of the Balkan Committee of AIESE. He received the "Republic Award" and was decorated with medals due to his contributions to Albanian culture.

Stefanaq Pollo died on May 15, 1997.

== Published works ==
- Historia e Shqipërisë: Vitet 30 të shek. XIX-1912.
- Historia E Popullit Shqiptar, Etc. (Volume 2: Stefanaq Pollo and Aleks Buda, editor in charge)
- History of Albania from its Origins to Present day
- Në gjurmë të historisë shqiptare
- Probleme të luftës për emancipimin e plotë të gruas
- Histoire de l'Albanie, des origines à nos jours. (1974).
- The Proclamation of Independence of Albania: Great Turning Point in the History of the Albanian People (report).
