= Andrea Pieroni =

Andrea Pieroni may refer to:

- Andrea Pieroni (ethnobotanist)
- Andrea Pieroni (politician)
