= Emperor Shun (disambiguation) =

Emperor Shun (fl. 2233 BC - 2184 BC) was a legendary leader of ancient China.

Emperor Shun may also refer to:

- Emperor Shun of Han (115–144), emperor of the Han dynasty
- Emperor Shun of Song (467–479), emperor of the Liu Song dynasty
- Toghon Temür (1320–1370), emperor of the Yuan dynasty
- Li Zicheng (1606–1645), the only emperor of Shun

== See also ==
- Shundi (disambiguation)
