= Aleks Buda =

Albanian historian

- Born: Aleks Buda; 7 September 1910; Elbasan, Ottoman Albania
- Died: 7 July 1993 (aged 82); Tirana, Albania
- Occupation: historian
- Relatives: Athina Buda (sister), Pirro Dodbiba (nephew), Niko Dodbiba (nephew), Bardhyl Dodbiba (nephew), Henrieta Dodbiba (niece), Klara Buda
- Family: Buda
- Awards: Honor of the Nation

Aleks Buda (7 September 1910 – 7 July 1993) was an Albanian historian. After completion of his education in Italy and Austria, he returned to Albania. Although his education was in literature, he made a career as a historian during the socialist period in Albania. He was a member and president of the Academy of Sciences of Albania.

== Early life ==
Buda was born on 7 September 1910 in Elbasan, Ottoman Empire (modern day Albania). He went to elementary school at Lecce in Italy and completed secondary school in Salzburg, Austria, in 1930. After that he enrolled in the University of Vienna where he studied philosophy and literature, but he returned to Albania without graduating.

== Professional career ==
Although his specialty was in literature, he made a career as a historian. He was also referred to as the founder of the Albanian post WWII historiography. Buda belonged to a group of most notable Albanian politician historians during the socialist period in Albania. Buda was a member and a president of the Academy of Sciences of Albania. In some sources he was referred to as personal confidant of Enver Hoxha. Buda was the only historian to participate in the Albanian Orthography Congress held in Tirana in 20–25 November 1972.

He participated at the National Conference of Ethnographic Studies held in 1976 to commemorate 35th anniversary of the establishment of Party of Labour of Albania. Buda belonged to a group of historians and Marxist philosophers who attacked contemporary theories and trends outside Albania as capitalist and revisionist.

Contemporary historians point to Buda's work as a source for the Albanian position of the origin of Albanians. He was considered as the leading Albanian scholar of Illyrian history who belonged to group of historians who also pointed out that there is no trace of Illyrians between the 6th century (when they were mentioned in historical documents for the last time) and the 11th century (when Albanians were recorded in historical documents for the first time). Based on the hypothesis of Illyrian origin of Albanians, Buda emphasized that Albanians belong to the oldest inhabitants of Balkans and even Europe.

Buda belonged to a small group of intellectuals allowed by the Albanian communist regime to have access to foreign literature in order to use them to prepare new ideological and theoretical directives for the rest of their colleagues.

== Bibliography ==
Buda's work include:

- Historia E Popullit Shqiptar, Etc. (Botim i Dytë.-Stefanaq Pollo Dhe Aleks Buda-redaktorë Përgjegjës.). Enti i teksteve dhe i mjeteve mësimore i Krahinës Socialiste Autonome të Kosovës. 1969., (coauthorship)
- Kuvendi I i Studimeve Ilire: Tiranë 15-20 shtator 1972 : [referate, kumtesa. 1974.
- Konferenca kombetare e studimeve per Lidhjen Shqiptare te Prizrenit, 1878-1881: (12-28 gershor 1978). Akademia e Shkencave e RPS të Shqipërisë, Instituti i Historisë. 1979.
- Problems of the formation of the Albanian people, their language and culture: conference (selection). The "8 Nëntori" Pub. House. 1984.

== Sources ==
- Jürgen Fischer, Bernd (1999), Albania at war, 1939-1945, West Lafayette, Ind.: Purdue University Press, ISBN 9780585063881, OCLC 42922446
