= Combiers =

- Commune
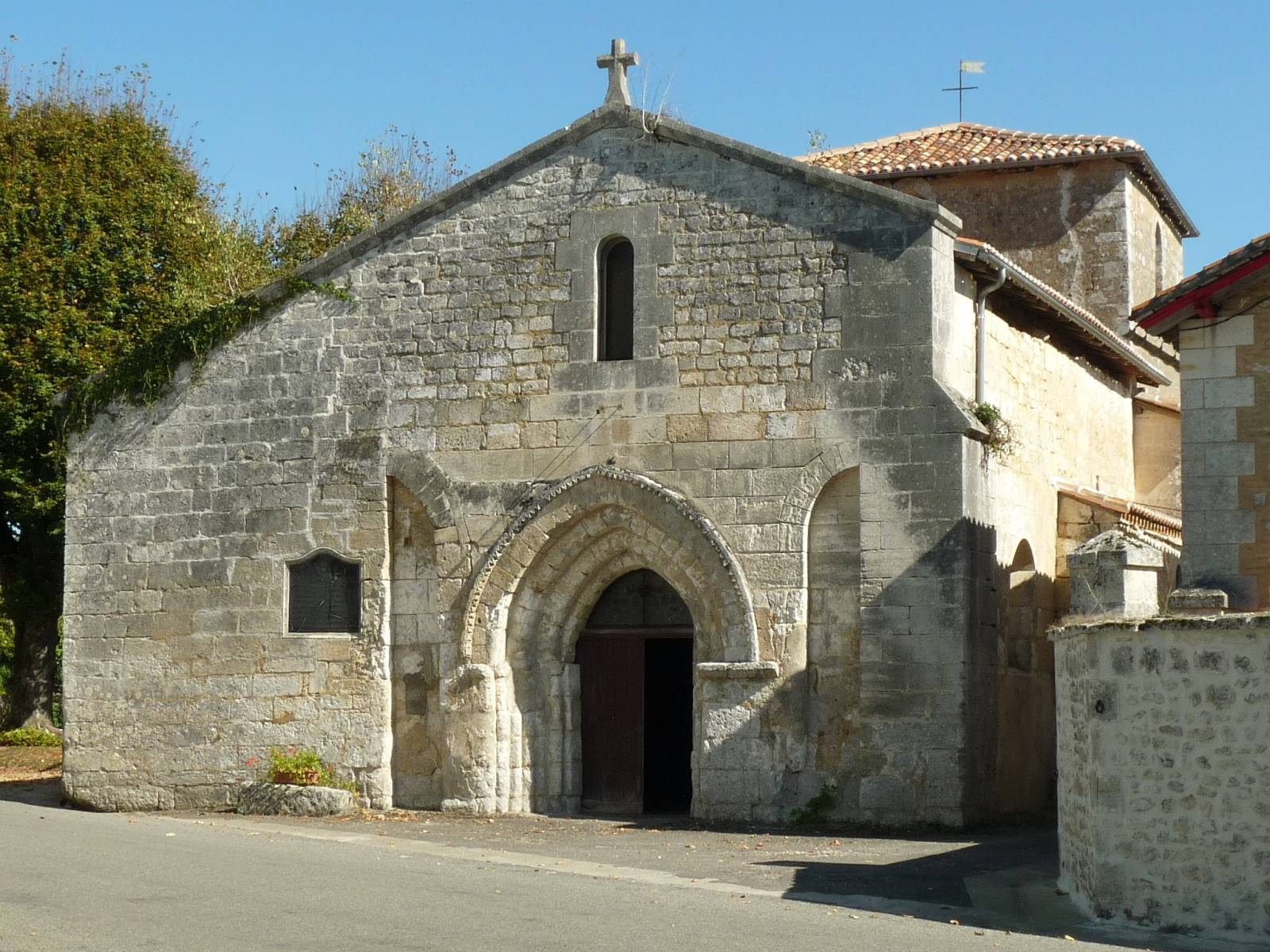
- The church in Combiers

- Coat of arms
- Location of Combiers
- Location within France Location within Nouvelle-Aquitaine
- Coordinates: 45°29′36″N 0°24′56″E
- Country: France
- Region: Nouvelle-Aquitaine
- Department: Charente
- Arrondissement: Angoulême
- Canton: Tude-et-Lavalette
- Intercommunality: Lavalette Tude Dronne

Government
  - Mayor (2020–2026): Patrick Épaud
- Area^{1}: 23.96 km^{2} (9.25 sq mi)
- Elevation: 100 m (330 ft)
- Highest elevation: 215 m (705 ft)
- Lowest elevation: 90 m (300 ft)
- Population (2023): 128
  - Density: 5.34/km^{2} (13.8/sq mi)
- Time zone: UTC+01:00 (CET)
  - Summer (DST): UTC+02:00 (CEST)
- INSEE/Postal code: 16103 /16320
- ^{1} French Land Register data, which excludes lakes, ponds, glaciers > 1 km^{2} (0.386 sq mi or 247 acres) and river estuaries.

Combiers (French pronunciation: [kɔ̃bje]; Occitan: Combier) is a commune in the Charente department in southwestern France.

== Geography ==
The Lizonne (locally called Nizonne) forms most of the commune's southern border.

== Population ==
Historical population
Year	Pop.	±% p.a.
1968	214	—
1975	154	−4.59%
1982	145	−0.86%
1990	127	−1.64%
1999	115	−1.10%
2007	116	+0.11%
2012	123	+1.18%
2017	124	+0.16%
2023	128	+0.53%
Source: INSEE

== Sights ==
- Arboretum Jean Aubouin
- The grandmontine priory of Rauzet

== See also ==
- Communes of the Charente department
