= Anila Paparisto =

Entomologist and taxonomist from Albania

Anila Paparisto is an entomologist and taxonomist from Albania, who was appointed in 2021 as Vice Rector for Teaching at the University of Tirana. She is also a professor of Invertebrate Zoology and Teaching Didactics at the university. Her career began at the university in 1994 and in 2011 was promoted to professor. Her research has focussed on invasive species in Albania, in particular in riverine environments. She is a member of the Academy of Sciences of Albania. She is a board member of the Quality Assurance Agency in Higher Education Board in Albania.

== Awards ==
In 2002, Paparisto was awarded a fellowship from the L'Oréal-UNESCO For Women in Science Awards for her work in molecular biology.
