= Beqir Meta =

Albanian historian

Beqir Meta (born 13 November 1957) is Albanian historian and member of the Academy of Sciences of Albania and director of the Institute of History. He published many works on Greek-Albanian relations. Meta is director of National Historical Museum and president of the Scientific Committee of the Mother Teresa Museum.
