= Commemorations of Mother Teresa =

Lists things named after Mother Teresa of Calcutta

Mother Teresa of Kolkata has been memorialized throughout the world in recognition of her work with the poor. During her lifetime this commemoration often took the form of awards and honorary degrees bestowed upon her. She has also been memorialized through museums and dedications of churches, roads and other structures.

== Mother Teresa in Albania ==
- Mother Teresa Day (Dita e Nënë Terezës) on September 5 is a public holiday in Albania.
- The Airport of Tirana, the capital of Albania, is the Tirana International Airport Nënë Tereza, named after Mother Teresa in 2002.
- The second largest square in Tirana, the Mother Teresa Square, is named after her.
- The biggest civil hospital in Tirana is named after her.

== Mother Teresa in North Macedonia ==
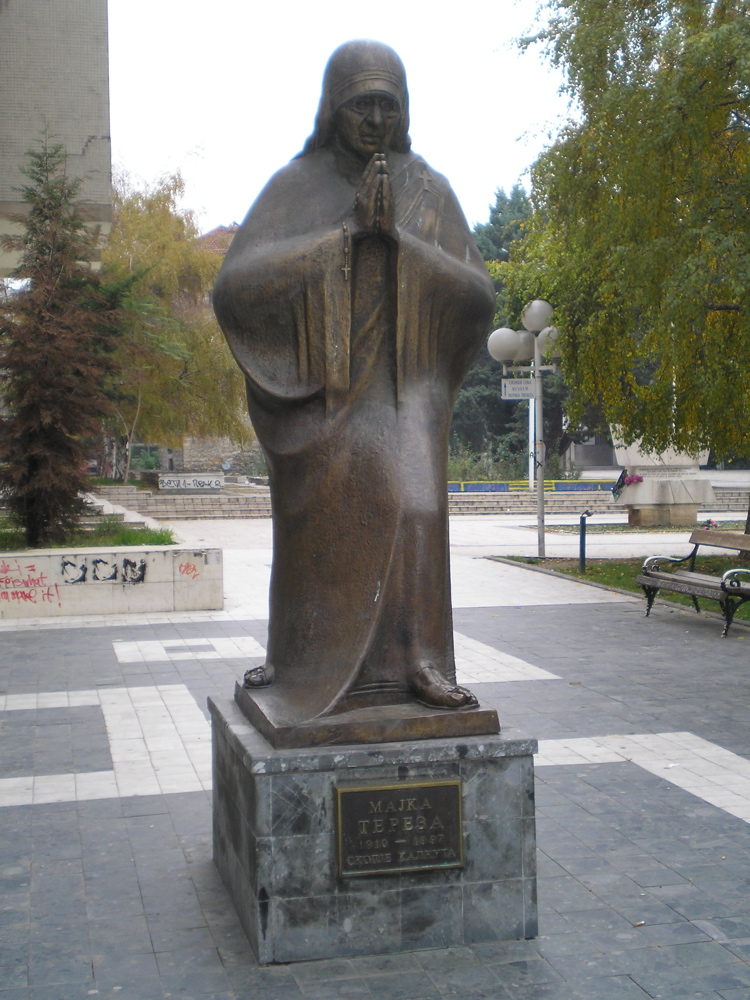
Statue of Mother Teresa in Skopje

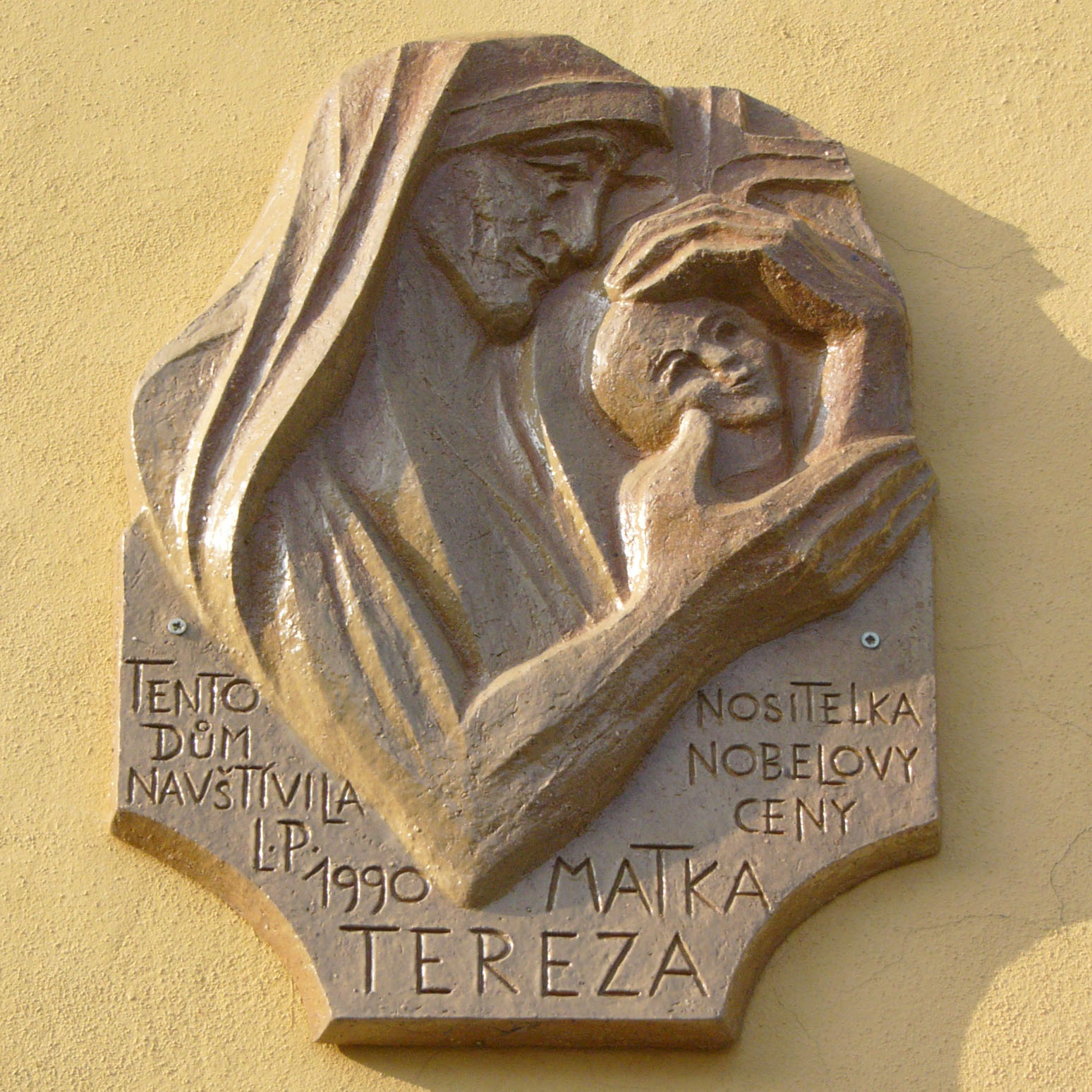
Memorial plaque dedicated to Mother Teresa at a building in Václavské náměstí in Olomouc, Czech Republic.

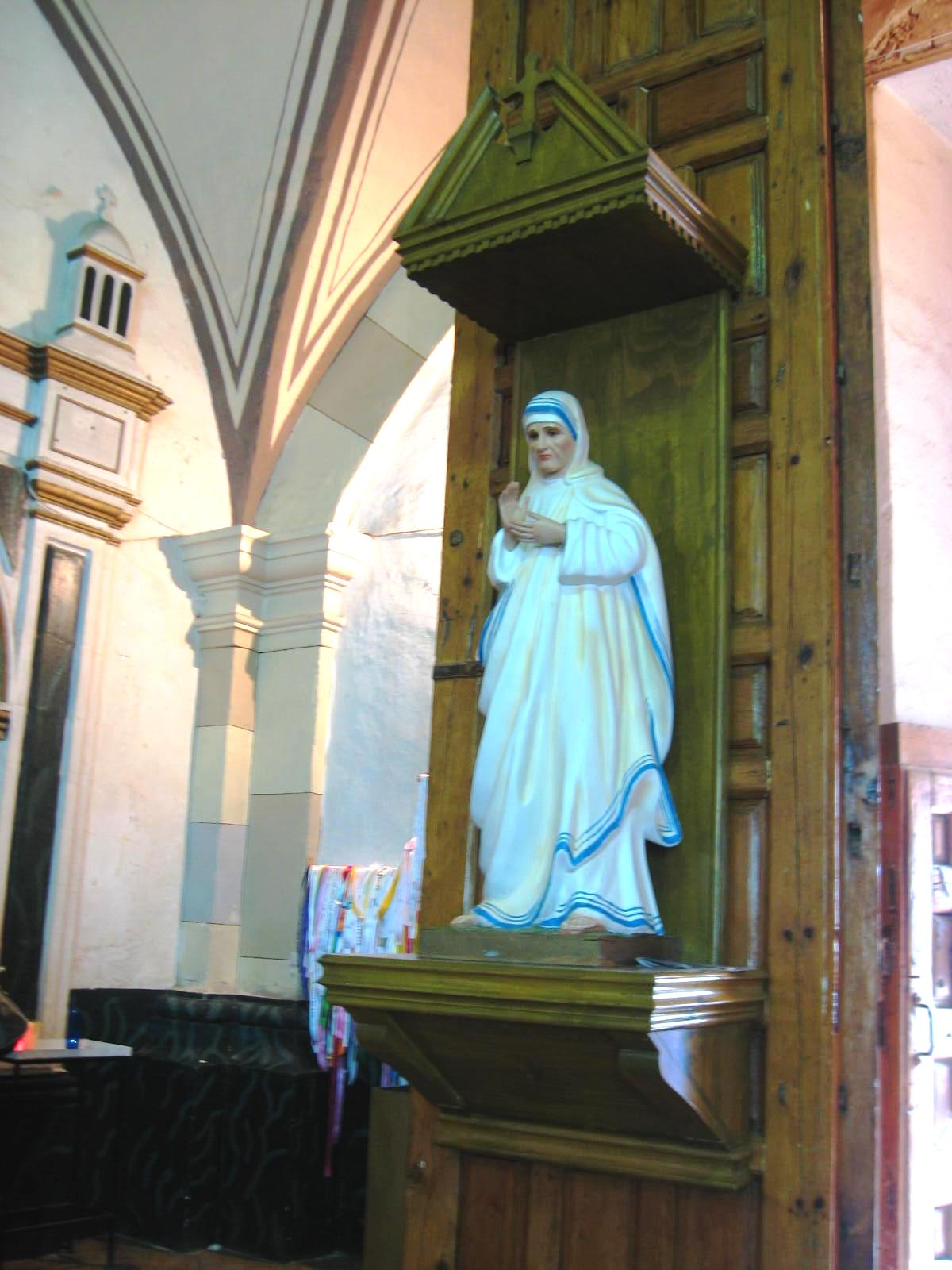
Statue of Mother Teresa on display at the Parish of Nuestra Señora del Rosario (Our Lady of the Rosary) in Real del Monte, Hidalgo, Mexico.

=== Memorial Museum ===
The Memorial House of Mother Teresa was opened in Mother Teresa's hometown of Skopje, present-day North Macedonia (41.993827°N 21.430689°E). The museum has a significant selection of objects from Mother Teresa's life in Skopje and relics from her later life. In the memorial room there is a model of her family home, made by Vojo Georgievski.

Next to the memorial room, there is an area with the image of Mother Teresa as well as a memorial park and fountain.

=== Memorial plaque ===
Just at the edge of Skopje's City Mall (Gradski Trgovski Centar), is the place where the house of Mother Teresa used to stand. The memorial plaque was dedicated in March 1998 and it reads: "On this place was the house where Gondža Bojadžiu - Mother Teresa - born on 26 August 1910". Her message to the world is also inscribed: "The world is not hungry for bread, but for love."

== Mother Teresa in Kosovo ==
Mother Teresa is held in high regard among Kosovars, who consider her one of their own, as she spent her childhood in Kosovo. The main street in Kosovo's capital Pristina is called Mother Teresa Street (Rruga Nëna Terezë). Zana Krasniqi, the Miss Kosovo Universe 2008, made mention of Mother Teresa, calling her a great ancestor.

== Mother Teresa in India ==
- In 1991, the Senate of Serampore College, Serampore, West Bengal, conferred upon her the degree of Doctor of Divinity (D.D.), honoris causa.
- The historic "Park Street" of Calcutta was renamed to "Mother Teresa Sarani".
- Indian Railways introduced a new train, "Mother Express", named after Mother Teresa, on August 26, 2010, to mark her birth centenary.
- Mother Teresa Women's University, in Kodaikanal, was established in 1984 as a public university by the Government of Tamil Nadu.
- Mother Theresa Postgraduate and Research Institute of Health Sciences, in Pondicherry, was established in 1999 by the Government of Puducherry.
- The charitable organisation Sevalaya runs the Mother Teresa Girls Home, providing poor and orphaned girls near the underserved village of Kasuva in Tamil Nadu with free food, clothing, shelter and education.
- Tamil Nadu State government organised centenary celebrations of Mother Teresa on December 4, 2010, in Chennai headed by Tamil Nadu chief minister M Karunanidhi.
- The government of India issued a special ₹5 coin to celebrate the 100th anniversary of her birth, (the amount of money Teresa had when she arrived in India) on 28 August 2010.
- Virar The cosmopolitan town of Virar near Mumbai has a church dedicated to "Blessed Mother Teresa".

== UN Exhibition and Conference ==
On September 8–9, 2016, in commemoration of her canonization, the Permanent Observer Mission of the Holy See hosted an exhibition focused on her life and work. Also scheduled was a conference, co-sponsored by the Permanent Mission of India to the UN and the Permanent Mission of Albania to the UN, relative to her message to the international community.

== Musical tribute ==
- In 1998, a musical tribute album was compiled and released by Lion Communications (Polygram Records). The album featured artists from around the world paying tribute to Mother Teresa and was called Mother, We'll Miss You. Some of the artists included on the CD were Jose Feliciano and gospel group Walt Whitman and the Soul Children of Chicago. The album was produced by Scottish singer Dave Kelly, who also wrote and performed the title track. Over fifty major American newspapers, such as The Boston Globe and The Philadelphia Inquirer, featured stories on the release of the tribute album and also took this opportunity to honor the life and work of Mother Teresa.

== Parishes with Mother Teresa as patroness ==
- St. Mother Teresa Of Calcutta Parish Biñan, Laguna, Philippines Launched in 1998.
- Mother Teresa parish, Dakota Dunes, SD, USA - September 1, 1999
- Blessed Teresa of Calcutta parish, Woodinville, WA, USA - July 1, 2004
- Blessed Teresa of Calcutta parish, Ferguson, MO, USA - July 1, 2005
- Blessed Teresa of Calcutta parish, North Lake, WI, USA - July 1, 2005
- Blessed Teresa of Calcutta parish, Limerick, PA, USA - July 1, 2006
- Blessed Teresa of Calcutta Parish, Halifax, NS, Canada
- Blessed Mother Teresa of Calcutta, Boston, MA, USA, 2004
- Saint Teresa of Calcutta, Mahanoy City, PA, USA - July 1, 2008

== Schools ==
- Mother Teresa Catholic Elementary School, YCDSB, Markham, Ontario, Canada - 1979
- St. Mother Teresa Catholic Academy, TCDSB, Scarbrough, Ontario, Canada - 1985
- Mother Teresa Elementary School, Edmonton, Alberta.
- Mother Teresa Of Calcutta Elementary School, Calgary, Alberta.
- Mother Teresa Catholic High School, OCSB, Ottawa, Ontario, Canada - 1998
- Mother Teresa Catholic Elementary School, Saskatoon, Saskatchewan, Canada - 2000
- Mother Teresa Catholic School, Kingston, Ontario, Canada - 1991
- Mother Teresa Regional School, Atlantic Highlands, New Jersey, US

== Streets ==
A block of Lydig Avenue, between Holland and Wallace Avenues, located in the New York City borough of the Bronx was renamed Mother Teresa Way on August 30, 2009, honoring her and the borough's growing Albanian community.

The historical Park Street in Calcutta (Kolkata) has been renamed as Mother Teresa Sarani (i.e., Mother Teresa Street) in 2004.

== Other ==
For their first match of March 2019, the women of the United States women's national soccer team each wore a jersey with the name of a woman they were honoring on the back; McCall Zerboni chose the name of Mother Teresa.

- 4390 Madreteresa minor planet named after her.
- A McDonnell Douglas MD-11 operated by KLM with the registration PH-KCI carried the name of Mother Teresa in Dutch and English. It was delivered on 11 October 1995 and flew for the airline until its retirement on 16 September 2012.
