= 2017 Independence Cup (Albania) =

Kupa Pavarësia

Tournament details
- Host country: Albania
- Dates: 28 November 2017
- Teams: 4 (from 1 confederation)
- Venue: 1 (in 1 host city)

Final positions
- Champions: Struga
- Runners-up: Otrant

Tournament statistics
- Matches played: 3

2017 Independence Cup (Albanian: 2017 Kupa Pavarësia) is the 9th edition of the football tournament Independence Cup. It was held in the annual anniversary of Albanian Flag Day. The participants were Albanian team Tirana, Macedonian club Struga (replacing Shkëndija), Montenegrin club Otrant and Kosovan club Liria (replacing Besa).

Struga won the tournament after penalty shoot-out.

== Matches ==
=== Semi-finals ===
28 November 2017

Liria	1–2	Otrant

Skënderbeu Stadium, Korçë
28 November 2017

Tirana	0–1	Struga

Skënderbeu Stadium, Korçë

=== Final ===
28 November 2017

Otrant	0–0	Struga
	Report
Penalties
	1–4

Skënderbeu Stadium, Korçë
