= Shundi (surname) =

Shundi is an Albanian surname.

== People ==
- Andrea Shundi (1934–2024), Albanian-American agronomist
- Athanas Shundi (1892–1940), Albanian pharmacist and politician
- Naun Shundi (1959–2025), Albanian actor, director and playwright
- Stefan Shundi (1906–1947), Albanian literary critic, writer, and sports organizer
