= Union of European Academies for Sciences applied to Agriculture, Food and Nature =

European network of Academies in Agricultural and Environmental Sciences

- Founded: 1999
- Official language: English
- Website: https://ueaa.info/

The Union of European Academies for Sciences applied to Agriculture, Food and Nature (UEAA) is a European network of national academies and scientific institutions focused on agriculture, food, and environmental sciences.

== History ==
UEAA was founded in Bologna in 1999 and its statutes were formally adopted during the first General Assembly held in Florence in October 2000. The organisation initially included 14 member academies and has since expanded to include institutions from a wide range of European countries.

For the 2026–2028 term, The Academy of Sciences of Albania has the presidency of the UEAA. Prof. Dr. Nazim Gruda is the current UEAA President for aforementioned term.

== Scope and activities ==
UEAA aims at promoting the cooperation among academies in the fields of agricultural science, food production, land use, forestry and forest products, and natural resource management. Its objectives include fostering scientific exchange, supporting innovation and sustainable development, and contributing scientific advice to policymakers and society.

The organisation provides a platform for collaboration between scientists and institutions across Europe, facilitating comparative studies, dissemination of knowledge, and public communication of science-based information.

UEAA operates through a General Assembly composed of its member academies, which meets periodically and oversees the organisation's activities and governance. Membership is open to European academies and similar institutions engaged in scientific research related to agriculture, food, and nature.

UEAA organises scientific meetings, symposia, and general assemblies, and contributes to discussions on European research policy, particularly in the agricultural and food sectors. It also promotes interdisciplinary research and international cooperation among scientists.

== The Vision and Strategic Path of UEAA ==
The history of the UEAA spans from 18th-century European academies to modern national research institutions. This synergy of diverse traditions enables the Union to address contemporary challenges from comprehensive perspectives, focusing on bridging environmental objectives with farmers' economic realities.

Under the current leadership, the Union has structured its roadmap for the next two years (2026-2028):

• Advancing Policy Impact: Providing independent, science-based evidence to European Union policymakers on complex issues like new genomic techniques and the post-2027 Common Agricultural Policy (CAP).

• Climate Adaptation and Technology: Championing smart irrigation and advanced production methods to tackle severe climate threats in Europe. The UEAA emphasizes that modern technologies must remain accessible to small-scale farmers to avoid structural disparities.

• Proactive Science Communication: Encouraging scientific academies to move past institutional barriers, translate complex data into accessible language, and enter public debates much earlier to counter misinformation.

• Next-Generation Inclusivity: Actively involving young researchers and ensuring smaller or regional research networks are fully represented in setting Europe's agricultural science agenda.
