= 2009 Independence Cup (Albania) =

Kupa Pavarësia

Tournament details
- Host country: Albania
- Dates: November 28, 2009
- Teams: 3 (from 1 confederation)
- Venue: 1 (in 1 host city)

Final positions
- Champions: (Albania) Flamurtari (3rd title)
- Runners-up: (North Macedonia) Shkëndija
- Third place: (Kosovo) Prishtina

Tournament statistics
- Matches played: 3
- Goals scored: 0 (0 per match)
- Top scorer: None
- All statistics correct as of 29 November 2016.

The 2009 Independence Cup was the inaugural men's association football friendly tournament organised by the Albanian Football Association on 28 November to commemorate Albanian Independence Day. Flamurtari of Albania, Shkëndija of Republic of Macedonia and Prishtina of Kosovo were invited to compete in the tournament, which was held at the Flamurtari Stadium in Vlorë, near the site of the Albanian Declaration of Independence on 28 November 1912.

Matches lasted 45 minutes each and the competition followed a point scoring system, whereby each team plays two matches, with three points awarded for a win, none for a loss with penalty shootouts determining the winners of drawn matches. All three matches finished in goalless draws and were all decided through penalty shootouts, with Flamurtari winning the tournament after defeating Shkëndija and Prishtina 11–10 and 3–2 on penalties, respectively.

== Standings ==
Pos	Team	Pld	W	L	GF	GA	GD	Pts
1	(Albania) Flamurtari	2	2	0	0	0	0	6
2	(North Macedonia) Shkëndija	2	1	1	0	0	0	3
3	(Kosovo) Prishtina	2	0	2	0	0	0	0

Updated to match(es) played on unknown. Source:

== Matches ==
28 November 2009

Flamurtari (Albania)	0–0	(North Macedonia) Shkëndija
Penalties
	11–10

Flamurtari Stadium, Vlorë
28 November 2009

Shkëndija (North Macedonia)	0–0	(Kosovo) Prishtina
Penalties
	5–4

Flamurtari Stadium, Vlorë
28 November 2009

Prishtina (Kosovo)	0–0	(Albania) Flamurtari
Penalties
	2–3

Flamurtari Stadium, Vlorë
