= Arboretum Jean Aubouin =

Arboretum in Poitou-Charentes, France

Coordinates: 45.49°N 0.415°E

The Arboretum Jean Aubouin (10 hectares) is an arboretum located in the Mothe-Clédou forest near Combiers, Charente, Poitou-Charentes, France. The arboretum was established in 1932 by botanist Jean Aubouin. It contains deciduous trees and conifers including Cedrus deodara, Sequoia sempervirens, etc.

== See also ==
- List of botanical gardens in France
