= James Pettifer =

British academic, author and journalist (born 1949)

James Pettifer is a British academic, author and journalist who has specialised in Balkan affairs.

== Biography ==
He was born in 1949 in Hereford and was educated at King's School, Worcester, and Hertford College, Oxford.

Pettifer has travelled extensively in Greece, Turkey and the Balkans and he has written several tourist guides to the region, including the Blue Guide to Albania and Kosovo, one of the few such guides to the area. In the media, he has reported mainly for The Times and The Wall Street Journal and he is a regular broadcaster and commentator on the Balkan countries on both radio and television.

His expertise has been employed academically. He was a Senior Associate Member of St Antony's College, Oxford, and a visiting professor in the Institute of Balkan Studies, in Thessaloniki. He is currently teaching Balkan history at the Oxford University Faculty of History.

== Works ==
Pettifer's published work includes:

- Turkish Labyrinth (Viking, 1997) ISBN 978-0-6708-5866-8
- Blue Guide Bulgaria (A & C Black, 1998) ISBN 978-0-3933-1796-1
- The New Macedonian Question (Springer, 1999) ISBN 978-0-2305-3579-4
- The Greeks: The Land and People Since the War (Penguin, 2000). ISBN 978-0-1402-8899-5
- Albania: From Anarchy to a Balkan Identity (with Miranda Vickers; NYU Press, 2000). ISBN 978-0-8147-8805-9
- Blue Guide Albania and Kosovo (A & C Black, 2000). ISBN 978-1-9051-3127-3
- Kosova Express: A Journey in Wartime (University of Wisconsin Press, 2005) ISBN 978-0-2992-0444-0
- The Albanian Question: Reshaping the Balkans (with Miranda Vickers; I.B. Tauris, 2009). ISBN 978-1-8488-5095-8
- The Making of the Greek Crisis (Penguin, 2012). ISBN 978-0-2419-6322-7
- The Kosova Liberation Army Underground War to Balkan Insurgency, 1948–2001 (Hurst & Company, 2012). ISBN 978-1-8490-4187-4
- Lakes and Empires in Macedonian History: Contesting the Waters (with Miranda Vickers; Bloomsbury Publishing, 2021) ISBN 978-1-3502-2614-2

He has published many papers in academic and other journals, a selection of which is available on his website.
