= Science and technology in Albania =

Expenditure for scientific research and Development in Albania does not exceed 0.18% of GDP, which marks the lowest level in Europe. Economic competitiveness and exports are low, with the economy still heavily skewed towards low technology.

== Overview ==
From 1993 human resources in sciences and technology have drastically decreased.

Various surveys show that during 1990-1999, approximately 40% of the professors and research scientists of the universities and science institutions in the country have emigrated.

Driving forces for the brain drain are found in the deteriorated economic living conditions, the lack of state of the art infrastructure and funds that constitute serious obstacles for research. Albania was ranked 67th in the Global Innovation Index in 2025.

== National strategy for scientific development ==
However, in 2009 the government approved the "National Strategy for Science, Technology and Innovation in Albania" covering the period 2009–2015. The document was coordinated by the Department of Strategy and Donor Coordination of the Prime Minister's Cabinet, in cooperation with the Ministry of Education and Science and with UNESCO assistance.

It fixes five strategic goals to 2015:

- to triple public spending on research and development (R&D) to 0.6% of GDP;
- to augment the share of gross domestic expenditure on R&D from foreign sources, including via the European Union's Framework Programmes for Research, to the point where it covers 40% of research spending;
- to create four or five Albanian centres of excellence in science which will be equipped with dedicated laboratory equipment and workspaces that could be used for pre-incubation, testing, certification and so on of new technology based firms;
- to double the number of researchers, both through 'brain gain' incentives like a returning researchers grant scheme and through the training of new researchers, including 500 PhDs: this will entail establishing up to three new doctoral programmes in Albanian universities;
- to stimulate innovation in 100 companies, either via investment in local R&D or via consortia with academic research institutes or foreign partners.

The Strategy is to be implemented in synergy with other sectoral strategies and taking into account Albania's Higher Education Strategy adopted in 2008 and the National Strategy for Development and Integration (2007–2013). The latter underlines the importance of modernising economic sectors such as the agro-food industry and tourism. It also underscores the strategic importance of energy, environmental and water resource management. Stakeholders have proposed prioritising fields of research such as agriculture and food, information and communication technologies (ICTs), public health, Albanology and humanities, natural resources, biotechnology, biodiversity, defence and security. Another feature of information technology development is e-learning. Now in Albania are also offered online courses.

The European Union (EU) has set clear objectives for research and innovation as part of its Lisbon Strategy for becoming the most competitive economy in the world. Like other Western Balkan countries aspiring to join the EU, Albania is trailing behind in the development process, having focused in recent years on laying the foundations for economic growth.

Deputy Prime Minister Genc Pollo acknowledges that "the high rates of socio-economic development required in the process of Albania's membership of the North Atlantic Treaty Organization (NATO) (now a member) and EU accession necessitate strengthening the role of science, technology and innovation in our society."

In August 2009, the government approved the establishment of the Albanian Agency of Research, Technology and Innovation, to improve policy implementation.

In 2006, the Albanian government undertook a deep reform of the scientific research system. The Academy of Sciences was re-organised along the model of many other European countries; it now operates through a selected community of scientists and no longer administrates research institutes, these having been integrated into the higher education system. Two new faculties have been set up: the Faculty of Information Technology at the Polytechnic University of Tirana and the Faculty of Biotechnology and Food at the Agricultural University of Tirana. The University of Tirana has also gained an Applied and Nuclear Physics Centre and Biotechnology Department. Twelve government agencies and centres for technology transfer have also been created.

== Personnel ==
Until recently, R&D and innovation statistics were not collected in Albania to OECD, Eurostat or UNESCO standards. A first survey of public and academic institutes was launched earlier this year and a business R&D and innovation survey is currently under way, both the support of UNESCO.

The restrictive visa regulations also hinder scientific exchange and temporary employment abroad.

There is a total of 578 scientific workers in Albania:

- 274 in Academy of Sciences
- 304 in R & D institutions of Ministries

The numbers of personnel in R & D in Albania are about 0.2 per 1000 population.
