= Jan and Cora Gordon =

English artist duo

Jan and Cora Gordon were a British art duo and co-authors active in the first half of the 20th century. They are known as contributors to the "tramp memoir" genre of travel writing of the interwar period.

== Background ==
Jan Gordon (1882–1944) was an English printmaker, a painter and draughtsman, and journalist and critic, born Godfrey Jervis Gordon at Wokingham in Berkshire, England. His wife Cora Gordon (born Cora Josephine Turner in Buxton, England, also known as Jo Gordon, 1879–1950) was an English artist, writer, and musician. The couple, painters in Paris during the Edwardian period, were married in 1909.

Cora Gordon
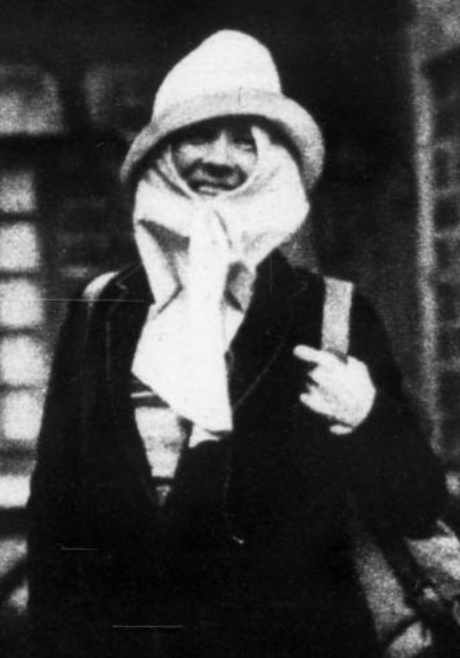
- Cora Gordon bundled up for travel in Scandinavia, from a 1924 publication
- Born: Cora Josephine Turner; 1879; Buxton, England
- Died: 1950 (aged 70–71); London, England
- Other name: Jo Gordon
- Education: Slade School
- Known for: Travel writing; painting; madrigals; journalism/literary criticism
- Spouse: Jan Gordon (m. 1909)

Jan Gordon
- Born: Godfrey Jervis Gordon; 1882; Finchampsted, Berkshire, England
- Died: 1944 (aged 61–62)
- Education: Marlborough College; Truro School of Mines; London School of Art; Academie Julien (did not matriculate)
- Occupations: Printmaker; painter/draughtsman; journalist/critic
- Spouse: Cora Gordon (m. 1909)

== Biography ==
Both Jan and Cora exhibited at the 1910 Allied Artists Association London salon.

Their first book, The Luck of Thirteen (1916), documented life in the Serbian mission of the Royal Free Hospital and an audacious escape during the 1915 retreat from Serbia. James Berry, leader of this mission, in his 1916 book described the Gordons and their various exploits during their time in Serbia.

According to Berry,

The chief credit for the success of the expedition seems to belong to Gordon, though how much was due to Mrs. Gordon's command of the Serb language cannot be estimated. ... The most extraordinary fact in the story of their escape is that of all the thousands of men, women, and children who fled from Serbia before the Austrians, a mere handful took the same route as Gordon's party.

Following the Serbia experience, Jan Gordon was active in the design of dazzle camouflage for WWI ships. He later held an exhibition of watercolours on the subject. After the war, a painting journey to Spain resulted in the 1922 book, Poor Folk in Spain, which was the beginning of a long and popular series of Two Vagabonds travel books.Jan and Cora Gordon were signatories to the 1927 letter protesting the piracy of James Joyce's Ulysses in the USA.

Between them, the couple wrote 27 books, including five novels and five books on art, together with numerous magazine articles.

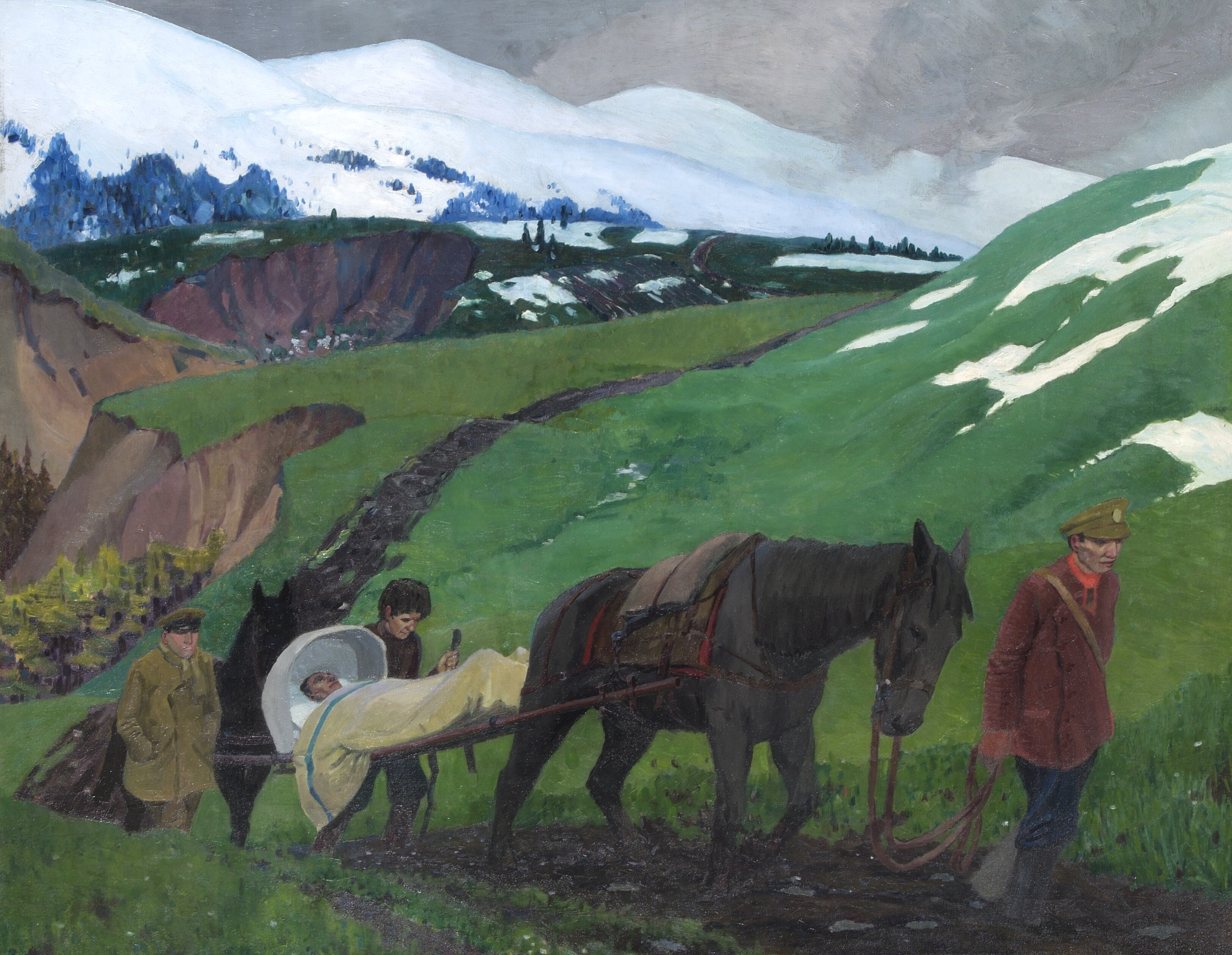
An Armoured Car Squadron, the transport of wounded on the Turkish front, by Jan Gordon circa 1918

== Associations ==
Jan and Cora Gordon had a wide network of artistic acquaintances in Paris between the wars. One of these, Myron Nutting (a friend of James Joyce), wrote affectionately about the Gordons, whom he last saw later in 1927 as they were planning their USA journey. Screenwriter Charles Bennett had also reminisced about the Gordons in Paris at around this time, mentioning some of the cast of characters in their circle of friends: "Through Jan and Cora Gordon I saw the Latin Quarter as it really was. I dined at tiny, superb, but cheap restaurants; the Rotonde and the Dome became my local pubs. I met Picasso and Utrillo and Diego Rivera, and dozens of others."

== Published works ==
- Gordon, Jan; Gordon, Cora (1916). The Luck of Thirteen : Wanderings and Flight through Montenegro and Serbia. London: Smith, Elder & co. p. 378.
  - Also published as Two Vagabonds in Serbia and Montenegro – 1915. Harmondsworth, Middlesex, England: Penguin. 1939. p. 246.
- Gordon, Jan (1916). A Balkan Freebooter: Being the True Exploits of the Serbia Outlaw and Comitaj Petko Moritch, Told by Him to the Author and Set into English. London: Smith, Elder & Co. p. 317.
  - Also published as Two Vagabonds in Spain. London: J. Lane. 1931. p. 286.
- Gordon, Jan (1923). Modern French Painters. New York: Dodd, Mead and Co. p. 188.
- Gordon, Jan; Gordon, Cora (1923). Two Vagabonds in Spain. New York: R. M. McBride. p. 275.
- Gordon, Jan; Gordon, Cora (1924). A Donkey Trip through Spain. New York: R. M. McBride & company. p. 273.;
  - Also published as Misadventures with a Donkey in Spain. Edinburgh and London: W. Blackwood and sons. 1924. p. 273.
- Gordon, Jan; Gordon, Cora (1925). Two Vagabonds in Languedoc : a Portrait Group in Prose. London: John Lane. p. 242.
  - Also published as Two Vagabonds in a French Village : a Portrait Group in Prose. New York: R. M. McBride and Co. 1925. p. 242.
- Gordon, Jan; Gordon, Cora (1925). Two Vagabonds in the Balkans. New York: R. M. McBride and Co. p. 236.
- Gordon, Jan; Gordon, Cora (1926). Two Vagabonds in Sweden and Lapland. London: John Lane the Bodley Head. p. 326.
- Gordon, Jan; Gordon, Cora (1927). Two Vagabonds in Albania. London: Lane. p. 304.
- Gordon, Jan; Gordon, Cora (1928). On Wandering Wheels : Through Roadside Camps from Maine to Georgia in an old Sedan Car. New York: Dodd, Mead & company. p. 336.
  - Also published as On Wandering Wheels : Through Roadside Camps from Maine to Georgia in an old Sedan Car. London: John Lane the Bodley Head. 1929. p. 336.
- Gordon, Jan; Gordon, Cora (1930). Star-Dust in Hollywood. London; Sydney: G. G. Harrap. p. 300.
- Gordon, Jan; Gordon, Cora (1932). Three Lands on Three Wheels. New York: W. Morrow and company. p. 358.
- Gordon, Jan (1934). A Step-ladder to Painting. London.
- Gordon, Cora (1934). Hiking On Horseback. London. The Oxford Annual For Girls
- Gordon, Jan; Gordon, Cora (1934). The London Roundabout. London: Harrap. p. 354.
- Gordon, Jan; Gordon, Cora (1935). Portuguese Somersault. New York: R. M. McBride. p. 311.
- Gordon, Jan; Bateman, Henry Mayo (1944). Art ain't all Paint. Feature Books.
- Gordon, Jan (1946). Smith, Jacob Getlar (ed.). Painting for Beginners. Garden City, N.Y.: Garden City Pub. Co. p. 293.
- Hiler, Hilaire (1950). Gordon, Jan (ed.). The Painter's Pocket-book of Methods and Materials. London: Faber and Faber, limited. p. 254.
- Gordon, Jan (1966). A Step-ladder to Painting (2nd revised by Colin Hayes ed.). Faber. p. 238.
