= Naun Shundi =

Albanian actor, director and playwright (1959–2025)

- Born: 3 February 1959; Tirana, PR Albania
- Died: 28 August 2025 (aged 66); Tirana, Albania
- Occupation(s): Actor, director, playwright
- Years active: 1980s–2025
- Spouse: Raimonda Shundi Dervishi
- Children: 2

Naun Shundi (3 February 1959 – 28 August 2025) was an Albanian actor, director and playwright. Over a career spanning more than four decades, he appeared in more than 100 stage roles and about 20 films. His work was primarily associated with the stage, where he was active as both an actor and director and was noted for his contribution to the development of Albanian theatre.

== Early life and education ==
Shundi was born in Tirana on 3 February 1959. He attended the Higher School of Culture, where he graduated in directing in 1977, and later the Higher Institute of Arts (today the Academy of Arts) in 1983. Shundi was then appointed an actor at the National Theatre.

== Career ==
In 1985, Shundi was appointed director of the Palace of Culture. The following year, he returned to the National Theatre.

In 1989, Shundi was named Best Actor at the Theatre Olympiad for his portrayal of Jovan Bregu in Pallati 176.

From 1993 to 2000, Shundi taught acting, directing, and artistic expression in the directing department of the Academy of Arts. In 1995, he undertook a directing specialization at the National Theatre of Bucharest and the Academy of Theatre and Film in Bucharest.

In August 2022, Shundi and his wife, Raimonda, founded what has been described as Albania's first private theatre, Zonja e Bujtinës. Days before his death, the theatre marked its third anniversary, during which Shundi released a video message emphasizing the importance of theatre and of staging Albanian works. The last play Shundi wrote and directed was the monodrama The Man of the Forest.

== Personal life and death ==
Shundi and his wife Raimonda had a daughter, Rea.

Shundi died from skin cancer on 28 August 2025, at the age of 66. He had stepped away from work on 16 August to undergo treatment in France, but later returned to Albania, where he continued medical care with expenses covered by the Ministry of Health and Social Protection.

== Filmography ==
- 2003 – Lettere al Vento (Letters In The Wind)

== Selected roles ==
According to Panorama, Shundi performed in around 60 stage roles, including:

- 1983 – Përballë vetes (Ruzhdi Pulaha, Dhimitër Pecani)
- 1989 – Linke in Kryqi i Bardhë (Brecht, Kumbaro)
- 1990 – Caesar in Natë me hënë (Budina)
- 1991 – Luigi in Zgjimi (Marko, Budina)
- 1991 – Aesop in Ezopi (Figereida, Pecani)
- 1992 – Aldo in Kush vjedh një këmbë, ka fat në dashuri (Fo, Kutali)
- 1992 – Shtefan in Loja e pushimeve (Sebastian, Kutali)
- 1993 – Fando in Fando e Lis (Arrabal, Qiriaqi)
- 1993 – Uran in Zoti godet me putër (Bezhani, Kame, Bylis Theatre – Fier)
- 1994 – Martin in Këngëtarja tullace (The Bald Soprano, Ionesco, Qiriaqi)
- 1995 – Bepe / Damian in Oportunesku (Mușatescu, Manolescu)
- 1995 – The Sculptor in Tiranozauri (Trebeshina, Kame)
- 1996 – The Actor in Në katin e dytë është parajsa (Bezhani)
- 1998 – Kopshti me dallëndyshe (Babis Cilkiropulos, Kiço Londo, National Theatre)
- 1999 – Dr. Arshambo in Darka e të marrëve (The Dinner of Fools, Kame)
- 2006 – Drejt perëndimit (Towards the West)
- 2007 – Kontrata (The Contract, Mrożek)
- 2008 – Fishkëllime në errësirë (Whistles in the Dark, Spiro Duni)
- 2008 – Berberi (The Barber, film by Fatmir Koçi)
- 2010 – Një tablo absurde (An Absurd Picture, Hysi, Milto Kutali)
- 2012 – Ëndrra e Ismail Qemalit (The Dream of Ismail Qemali) as Faik Konica (Spiro Duni, National Theatre)
- 2012 – Henry IV (Globe to Globe, World Shakespeare Festival)
- 2014 – Liri në Bremen (Freedom in Bremen, Fassbinder, National Theatre)
- 2016 – Tri motrat (Three Sisters, National Theatre)
