= 2026 Albanian floods =

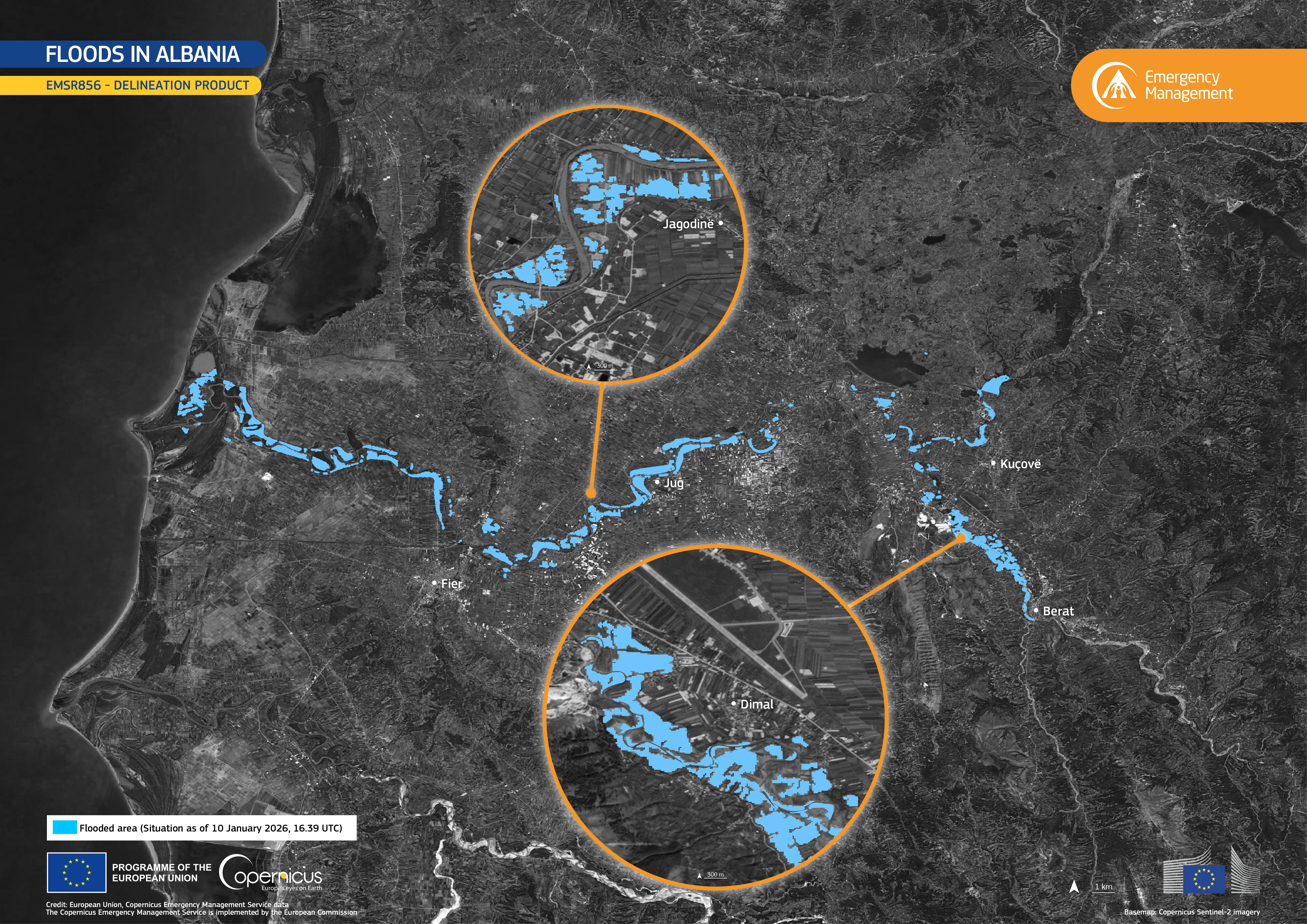
- Area affected by floods in Albania
- Date: 6 January 2026– 12 January 2026
- Location: Nationwide, especially in Durrës, Lezhë, Fier, Vlorë, Shkodër, Gjirokastër and Korçë counties
- Deaths: 1

Several days of major flooding affected the central and western regions of Albania around Durrës, Vlorë, Fier, and Lezhë in January 2026.

== Overview ==
Heavy rainfall that began on 6 January led to flooding across several towns and villages, causing widespread disruption. Due to the situation that was created, schools were closed in Durrës and Lezhë for the time being.

By 8 January, flooding had expanded across several regions following earlier warnings issued by the Institute of Geosciences. The Institute had publicly reported the likelihood of intense rainfall and high river flows in the Drin-Buna, Mat, Shkumbin, and Vjosa basins. Opposition parties and affected communities criticized the government for what they described as a slow and inadequate response, with opposition politicians calling for the declaration of a state of emergency. The government responded to the situation by deploying 502 soldiers and 80 vehicles The floods also caused significant damage to key highways across the country.

On 8 January, a 54-year-old man was found dead after being swept away in Durrës, as swollen rivers prompted evacuations in several regions. Authorities reported hundreds of evacuations in Durrës and Novosela, along with landslides and blocked roads in multiple parts of the country.

On 10 January, the embankment of the Devoll river cracked, leaving around 1800 families without electricity, and affecting the municipalities of Korçë, Devoll, Maliq and Pogradec.

== Aftermath ==
Prosecutors in Durrës started an investigation into suspected abuse of office and negligence after flooding caused widespread disruption, damage to property, and risk to the safety of the affected areas. The probe aims to examine whether the damage was solely due to natural factors or to failures by state or local authorities.

== See also ==
- 2009-10 Albanian floods
