= Public holidays in Albania =

There are 15 official public holidays observed in Albania. If a non-working public holiday falls on the weekend, then the first working day afterwards is a non-working day.

== Official public holidays ==
Official Holidays
Date	English name	Albanian name	Remarks
1-2 January	New Year's Day	Viti i Ri	
14 March	Summer Day	Dita e Verës	ratified by the Albanian Parliament in 2004
22 March	Newruz Day	Dita e Nevruzit	as Bektashi Order and Persian Culture (Newroz)
31 March	Catholic Easter	Pashkët Katolike	date varies
1 May	International Labor Day	Dita Ndërkombëtare e Punës	Workers' Day
5 May	Orthodox Easter	Pashkët Ortodokse	date varies, trailing Catholic Easter by 0 to 5 weeks.
5 September	Mother Teresa Day	Dita e Nënë Terezës	ratified by Albanian Parliament as an official and national holiday
22 November	Alphabet Day	Dita e Alfabetit	celebrates the Congress of Manastir, which unified the country's alphabets
28 November	Independence Day	Dita e Pavarësisë	Albanian Declaration of Independence
29 November	Liberation Day	Dita e Çlirimit	commemorates the day Albania was liberated from German occupation during World War Two.
8 December	National Youth Day	Dita Kombëtare e Rinisë	ratified by the Albanian Parliament in 2010
25 December	Christmas Day	Krishtlindjet	
1 Shawwal	Eid al-Fitr	Bajrami i Madh (Fitër Bajrami)	date varies
10 Dhu al-Hijja	Eid al-Adha	Bajrami i Vogël (Kurban Bajrami)	date varies

== Unofficial holidays ==
Date	English name	Albanian name	Remarks
2 March	League of Lezhë	Lidhja e Lezhës	not official – working day
7 March	Teacher's Day	Dita e Mësuesit	not official – working day
8 March	International Women's Day	Dita Ndërkombëtare e Gruas	not official – working day
5 May	Martyrs' Day	Dita e Dëshmorëve	not official – working day. Commemorates people who died fighting for Albania during the Second World War.
1 June	International Children's Day	Dita Ndërkombëtare e Fëmijëve	not official – working day
28 November	Constitution Day	Dita e Kushtetutës	not official – working day
24 December	Christmas Eve	Krishtlindjet	Christmas Eve, optional bank holiday
31 December	New Year's Eve	Viti i Ri	New Year's Eve, optional bank holiday
