= 2027 Albanian local elections =

- 9 May 2027

The 2027 Albanian local elections are scheduled to be held on 9 May 2027, to elect city mayors and municipal council seats. Following the adoption of a new administrative-territorial reform, elections will take place across 46 municipalities (down from the previous 61), encompassing 71 constituent cities and 387 administrative units.

== Background ==
On October 9, 2026, the Albanian Parliament approved with votes of the Socialist Party and Social Democratic Party a new administrative-territorial division. The reform proposed by the Socialist Party introduced a reduction in the number of municipalities from 61 to 46, through the merger of 15 municipalities and their union with larger local units.

Later in October the State Election Commissioner Ilirjan Celibashi proposed the deployment of electronic voting in the 2027 local elections in 3-4 big municipalities. During consultations with opposition parties, the Democratic Party of Albania opposed the proposal fearing manipulation during electronic voting and vote count.

== Opinion polls ==
=== Tirana ===
Polling firm	Polling dates	Sample	Margin of error	Socialist Party	Democratic Party-ASHM	Opportunity Party	Shqipëria Bëhet	Social Democratic Party	Lëvizja Bashkë	Others	Lead
Notosondaggi + Syri TV	18 – 27 October 2026	2,000	± 3.3%	42%	37.5%	6%	5%	1.5%	4%	4%	4.5%
2025 election	11 May 2025	475,432	—	48.33%	34.43%	4.97%	3.47%	3.10%	2.80%	2.90%	13.90%
