= Andrea Pieroni (ethnobotanist) =

Italian academic

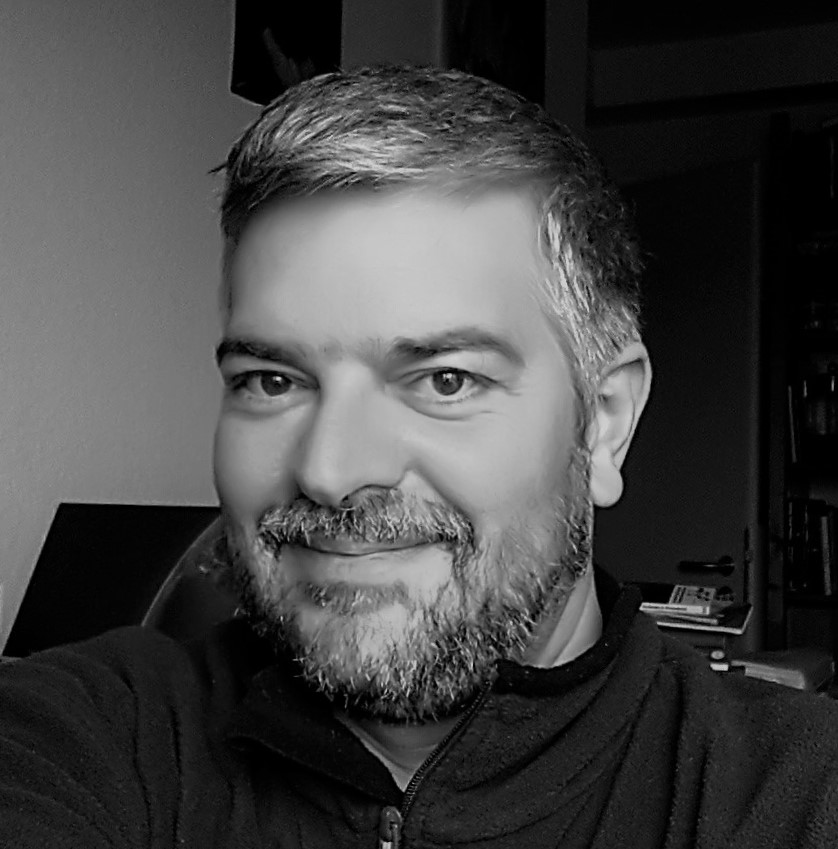
- Born: 1967 (age 58–59)

Academic background
- Education: University of Pisa (MSc); University of Bonn (PhD)

Academic work
- Discipline: ethnobiology; ethnobotany; food heritage

Andrea Pieroni (born 1967, Lucca, Italy) is a professor of ethnobotany and ethnobiology at the University of Gastronomic Sciences in Pollenzo, Italy, where he was rector until 2021.

== Biography ==
Pieroni took a masters in pharmacy from the University of Pisa in 1993, and a doctorate from the University of Bonn in 1998. He was a research associate at theSchhol of Pharmacy, University of London from 2000 to 2003, and lectured at the University of Bradford from then until 2009. He became an associate professor of ethnobotany at the University of Gastronomic Sciences from January 2009, and was made a full professor in 2016; he was rector from 2017 to 2021.

Between 2006 and 2010 he was on the leadership team of the International Society of Ethnobiology. He was the founding editor of the "Journal of Ethnobiology and Ethnomedicine". He is a foreign member of the Academy of Sciences of Albania.
