= Luan Omari =

Albanian academic (1925–2026)

- Born: 10 June 1925; Tirana, Albania
- Died: 29 October 2026 (aged 101); Tirana, Albania
- Education: University of Belgrade
- Occupation: Academic

Luan Omari (10 June 1925 – 29 October 2026) was an Albanian jurist, legal scholar and academic. He was one of the founding members of the Academy of Sciences of Albania in 1972.

== Early life and education ==
Omari was born in Tirana, Albania, on 10 June 1925. He completed his secondary education at the Classical Lyceum in Bari, Italy. Following the end of World War II, he pursued higher education in legal sciences abroad, studying at the University of Belgrade and subsequently graduating from Sofia University in Bulgaria.

== Academic and legal career ==
Upon returning to Albania, Omari dedicated his career to legal education and scientific research. He became one of the primary professors of constitutional law in the country. For nearly two decades, he served as the Dean of the Faculty of Law at the University of Tirana, shaping generations of Albanian lawyers and legal experts. In 1972, Omari was appointed one of the founding assembly members of the newly established Academy of Sciences of Albania. Throughout his tenure at the academy, he held several high-ranking leadership positions, including Scientific Secretary and vice-president.

Following the democratic transition of Albania in the early 1990s, Omari became a key figure in aligning Albanian legal frameworks with European standards. From 1994 to 2004, he represented the Republic of Albania as a member of the Venice Commission, the European Commission for Democracy through Law, of the Council of Europe.

== Personal life and death ==
Omari died on 29 October 2026, at the age of 101, making him the first Albanian academic to live past a century. State and academic honors were held in his memory at the central hall of the Academy of Sciences in Tirana.
