= Albert Doja =

Albert Doja is a French university professor (professeur des universités) of Anthropology.

He obtained his PhD in Social Anthropology in 1993 from the School for Advanced Studies in the Social Sciences (EHESS) Paris and his Habilitation in 2004 from the University of Paris (Paris Descartes University), the Sorbonne.

He was elected in 2008 as a full regular member to the National Academy of Sciences of Albania, holding the first Chair of Anthropology.

He is appointed in 2011 as a professor at the University of Lille.

In 2020, he is appointed a Member of the French National Council of Universities (Conseil national des universités CNU), anthropology section.

== Research profile ==
Albert Doja is educated in social anthropology, and had expanded his research interdisciplinarily across social, political, and anthropological theory. His primary area of research interest is in sociocultural anthropology and is focused on European studies, mainly in the Southeast European area, using empirical and historical analyses of social relations grounded on fieldwork and ethnographic materials. His ongoing research projects may be understood as extending his earlier work on social organization, gender construction, identity politics, collective representations, cultural activism, and knowledge production in Albanian and Southeast European contexts. Among other things, he had extensively worked and published on interethnic conflict and wartime sexual violence, as well as on the anthropological study of religion and the instrumentality of religious movements as they are lived and practiced in different cultural and political contexts. He was also lead to explore the contemporary issues of intercultural dynamics of social norms and values, the ideological and instrumental foundations of religious meanings, identity transformations and international representations, and the sociocultural approaches to global political processes.

== Career ==
Previously he taught at the University of Provence and the Paris 8 University, and he was a researcher at the French National Center for Scientific Research (CNRS) and the Maison des Sciences de l'Homme in Paris. He was also a lecturer of anthropology at the University of Hull in Britain and a research scholar at the University of Limerick in Ireland. In Albania, he was a researcher at the Institute of People's Culture, he taught at the University of New York (Tirana), the European University of Tirana, and the University of Korça. In 2006, he was appointed Vice-Rector of the founding team of the new University of Durrës upon invitation by the United Nations Development Program.

He was an Honorary Research Fellow of the Anthropology Department at the University College London from 2004 to 2011 and a visiting scholar at Harvard University in 2017–2018.

He acted as a member of the social and political sciences board of the Research Foundation – Flanders (FWO) in Belgium and the National Council of Science in Latvia.

Among assessments in anthropology, Claude Lévi-Strauss wrote him a personal letter on July 1, 2006, in which he mentioned the "degree of deep knowledge", as well as the "rigor and dialectical significance of his analysis", or even his "courage and foresight" in dealing with anthropological issues.

Relevant publications are reprinted or translated into other European or Asian languages, including from French to English, and since 2000, from English to French, Albanian, Italian, German, Russian, Serbian, Czech, Estonian, Turkish, Vietnamese, etc.

== Research themes ==
=== Neo-structural constructivism ===
In a number of papers, Albert Doja has undertaken a thorough critique of the postmodernist rhetoric of post-structuralism, in a broader context of the reassessment of structural legacy in anthropology. His aim is to move towards an innovative reflexive movement of neo-structural constructivism, which may suggest the potential elaboration of a new vision for the future development of anthropology and social theory integrating French and British-American traditions. He is basing his arguments on an innovative elaboration of Levi-Strauss’s conceptual and theoretical tools in the French tradition of anthropology. His ex plicit purpose is to further contribute methodologically and empirically to this theoretical movement in construing a neo-structural model of canonical modelling and discursive morphodynamic and transformational analysis, which could offer a new and powerful explanatory instrument to critically approach the normative power of knowledge cultures and ideologies. At the same time, he advanced a new structural constructivist theory of the identity and representational field as a workable methodology towards a critical understanding of interactive relations between structure and agency under the impact of culture and ideology as political and normative instruments of power and hegemony.

=== The critique of rhetorical reproduction of postmodernism ===
Albert Doja is known for taking issue with a now much read critique, in which Jacques Derrida claimed to show the weakness and the supposed contradictions of Levi-Strauss’s interpretation of writing and his characterization of modern industrial society by the pathology of written communication. Levi-Strauss is tweaked for ethnocentrism, subjectivism, empiricism, truism, archaism, primitivist utopia, epigenetism, sloppy thinking, theology and metaphysics, in short for everything at odds with what normally stands as Levi-Straussian analysis. In turn, Doja argued that, by misconstruing Levi-Strauss’s actual theoretical and epistemological contribution to general knowledge, Derrida’s reading of Levi-Strauss's Tristes Tropiques is exemplary and influential in that it joins together all the essential didactic elements of "deconstructionist" criticism, and seems to be what exactly "crit-lit" deconstructionism is all about, which in the last analysis turns into an arrogant scholastics that only ignorance or deliberate misinformation could allow.

More recently, Albert Doja offered a non-polemical etiology to the controversial issue of inclusive writing in French. To this end, he returns to the old debate on the place of writing between Derrida and Lévi-Strauss, which has become a founding moment in the history of ideas. He first noted Derrida's intellectual imposture on which all the enthusiasm of the deconstructionist turn subsequently relied. This allows making the link between the genealogy of deconstructionism and the exclusive politics of inclusive writing. Far from common and partisan declarations, or the sterile speculations in bad faith on the notion of deconstruction, coming back to the analysis of this notorious misrepresentation, new empirical and analytical arguments make it possible to better understand the current evolution of fundamentalist drifts that are bringing radical deviations and epidermal reactions.

=== Religious morphodynamics ===
Albert Doja has been working extensively on what he refers to as “religious morphodynamics”, taking the political history of Bektashism, a Sufi-Shiite religious movement within Islam, as an illustrative example of the transformational history of religion from a movement into established institution. With an innovative and well-argued approach, he demonstrates that the system of beliefs and practices related to Bektashism corresponded to a kind of liberation theology, whereas the structure of Bektashi groups corresponded more or less to the type of religious organization conventionally known as charismatic groups and ecclesial base communities. The main argument is that because of these theological doctrines and organizational structures, Bektashi spiritual tendency did at times connect with and meet social, cultural and national perspectives. It is the overall combination of these factors that cast the Bektashis, like heterodox mystics and heretics of any kind, as non-conformist and often dangerous for the political establishment. Albert Doja shows that this was the case with the Bektashis as much in Ottoman Anatolia and Modern Turkey, as in early independent or in postcommunist Albania. However, in other circumstances, they were politically compliant and reliable, depending on political situations, when members of the previously persecuted religious minority acquired a degree of religious and political respectability within society at large. At that time, the doctrines of heterodoxy and liberation theology fade into the background. In the end, the heirs of the heterodox promoters of spiritual reform and social movement turn into followers and faithful defenders of a legitimate authority. They become the spokespeople for an institutionalized orthodoxy whose support is sought by the political regime.

== Publications ==
- Albert Doja. On Agamben, and Acts of Faith, under Oath: Meaning transformations in language, morality, and religion. Springer Nature, 2026, ISBN 978-3-032-15418-7. ⟨doi:10.1007/978-3-032-15416-3⟩. ⟨Available here⟩
- Albert Doja. Invitation au terrain: Mémoire personnel de la construction du projet socio-anthropologique. Peter Lang, 2013, ISBN 978-2-87574-023-6, 9783035262995. ⟨doi:10.3726/978-3-0352-6299-5⟩. ⟨halshs-01152300⟩
- Albert Doja. Naître et Grandir chez les Albanais: La Construction Culturelle de la Personne. L'Harmattan, 2000. ⟨halshs-00406333⟩
- Albert Doja. Përdorimi Politik i Fesë në Rindërtimin e Identiteteve: Rasti shqiptar. Tirana: AIIS Press, 2001. ⟨halshs-00486061⟩
- Albert Doja. Bektashism in Albania: Political history of a Religious Movement. AIIS Press, 2008, ISBN 978-99943-742-8-1. ⟨halshs-01382774⟩
- Albert Doja. Ardhja e Antropologjisë në Shqipëri. Academia e Shkencave 2018, 2nd ed. UET Press 2021. ISBN 978-9928-237-53-8, 978-9928-320-47-6. ⟨halshs-03293445⟩

=== Selected chapters and peer-review articles on neo-structural constructivism ===
- Albert Doja. Structural models in anthropology. Reference Module Collection in Social Sciences: Encyclopedia of Measurement in Social Sciences, Elsevier Major Reference Works, 2025. ⟨doi:10.1016/B978-0-443-26629-4.00002-2⟩. ⟨halshs-05056548⟩
- Albert Doja, Laurent Capocchi, Jean-François Santucci. Computational challenges to test and revitalize Claude Lévi-Strauss transformational methodology. Big Data & Society, SAGE, 2021, 8 (2), ⟨10.1177/20539517211037862⟩. ⟨halshs-03348771⟩
- Albert Doja, Enika Abazi. The Mytho-Logics of Othering and Containment: Culture, Politics and Theory in International Relations. International Critical Thought, Routledge (Taylor & Francis), 2021, pp. 1–26. ⟨10.1080/21598282.2021.1886145⟩. ⟨halshs-03157285⟩
- Albert Doja. Celebrations of Lévi-Strauss's Heroic Legacy. Journal of the Royal Anthropological Institute, Wiley, 2020, 26 (4), pp. 864–871. ⟨10.1111/1467-9655.13366⟩. ⟨halshs-03013705⟩
- Jean-Francois Santucci, Albert Doja, Laurent Capocchi. A Discrete-Event Simulation of Claude Lévi-Strauss’ Structural Analysis of Myths based on Symmetry and Double Twist Transformations. Symmetry, MDPI, 2020, 12 (10), 1706. ⟨10.3390/sym12101706⟩. ⟨halshs-02970262⟩
- Albert Doja. Lévi-Strauss's heroic anthropology facing contemporary problems of the modern world. Reviews in Anthropology, Informa UK (Taylor & Francis), 2020, 49 (1–2), pp. 4–38. ⟨10.1080/00938157.2020.1794140⟩. ⟨halshs-02970263⟩
- Albert Doja. Politics of mass rapes in ethnic conflict: A morphodynamics of raw madness and cooked evil. Crime, Law and Social Change, Springer Verlag, 2019, 71 (5), pp. 541–580. ⟨10.1007/s10611-018-9800-0⟩. ⟨halshs-01319734⟩
- Albert Doja. In Hoc Signo Vinces: The Politics of Religion as a Source of Power and Conflict. Politics, Religion and Ideology, Taylor & Francis (Routledge), 2019, 20 (4), pp. 447–466. ⟨10.1080/21567689.2019.1697871⟩. ⟨halshs-02440393⟩
- Albert Doja. Social Morphodynamics: Mapping Identity Transformations, Cultural Encounters, and the Evolution of Core Values. Social Epistemology Review and Reply Collective, 2018, 7 (1), pp. 14–25. ⟨halshs-01691090⟩
- Albert Doja. Claude Lévi-Strauss (1908–2009): The apotheosis of heroic anthropology. Anthropology Today, Wiley, 2010, 26 (5), pp. 18–23. ⟨10.1111/j.1467-8322.2010.00758.x⟩. ⟨halshs-00523837⟩
- Albert Doja. Claude Lévi-Strauss at his Centennial: toward a future anthropology. Theory, Culture & Society, 2008, 25 (7–8), pp. 321–340. ⟨10.1177/0263276408097810⟩. ⟨halshs-00405936⟩
- Albert Doja. From Neolithic Naturalness to Tristes Tropiques: the emergence of Lévi-Strauss's new humanism. Theory, Culture & Society, 2008, 25 (1), pp. 77–100. ⟨10.1177/0263276407090015⟩. ⟨halshs-00405940⟩
- Albert Doja. The kind of writing: anthropology and the rhetorical reproduction of postmodernism. Critique of Anthropology, SAGE Publications, 2006, 26 (2), pp. 157–180. ⟨10.1177/0308275X06064993⟩. ⟨halshs-00405948⟩

=== Selected peer-review articles on religious morphodynamics ===
- Albert Doja. Histoire et dialectique des idéologies et significations religieuses. European Legacy–Towards New Paradigms: Journal of the International Society for the Study of European Ideas, Taylor & Francis (Routledge), 2000, 5 (5), pp. 663–685. ⟨10.1080/713665519⟩. ⟨halshs-00406263⟩
- Albert Doja. Spiritual surrender: from companionship to hierarchy in the history of Bektashism. Numen: International Review for the History of Religions, 2006, 53 (4), pp. 448–510. ⟨10.1163/156852706778941996⟩. ⟨halshs-00405963⟩
- Albert Doja. A political history of Bektashism in Albania. Politics, Religion and Ideology [Totalitarian Movements and Political Religions], Taylor & Francis (Routledge), 2006, 7 (1), pp. 83–107. ⟨10.1080/14690760500477919⟩. ⟨halshs-00425475⟩
- Albert Doja. A political history of Bektashism from Ottoman Anatolia to Contemporary Turkey. Journal of Church and State, Oxford University Press (OUP), 2006, 48 (2), pp. 423–450. ⟨10.1093/jcs/48.2.423⟩. ⟨halshs-00405969⟩
- Albert Doja. The politics of religious dualism: Naim Frashëri and his elective affinity to religion in the course of 19th-century Albanian activism. Social Compass: International Review of Sociology of Religion, 2012, 60 (1), pp. 115–133. ⟨10.1177/0037768612471770⟩. ⟨halshs-00806371⟩
- Enika Abazi, Albert Doja. Further Considerations on the Politics of Religious Discourse: Naim Frashëri and his Pantheism in the Course of Nineteenth-Century Albanian Nationalism. Middle Eastern Studies, Taylor & Francis (Routledge), 2013, 49 (6), pp. 859–879. ⟨10.1080/00263206.2013.836495⟩. ⟨halshs-00922488⟩
- Albert Doja. Confraternal religion: from liberation theology to political reversal. History and Anthropology, Taylor & Francis (Routledge), 2003, 14 (4), pp. 349–381. ⟨10.1080/0275720032000156488⟩. ⟨halshs-00405977⟩
- Albert Doja. The Politics of Religion in the Reconstruction of Identities: The Albanian Situation. Critique of Anthropology, SAGE Publications, 2000, 20 (4), pp. 421–438. ⟨10.1177/0308275X0002000404⟩. ⟨halshs-00406257⟩

=== Other peer-review articles ===
- Albert Doja. The New German-speaking School of Balkankompetenzen: Knowledge production and truth claims in post-colonial post-communist context. New Perspectives Quarterly, Wiley, 2022, 30 (1), pp. 87–118. ⟨10.1177/2336825X211065569⟩. ⟨halshs-03548311⟩
- Enika Abazi, Albert Doja. Time and narrative: Temporality, memory, and instant history of Balkan wars. Time and Society, SAGE Publications, 2018, 27 (2), pp. 239–272. ⟨10.1177/0961463x16678249⟩. ⟨halshs-01412261⟩
- Enika Abazi, Albert Doja. The past in the present: time and narrative of Balkan wars in media industry and international politics. Third World Quarterly, Taylor & Francis (Routledge), 2017, 38 (4), pp. 1012–1042. ⟨10.1080/01436597.2016.1191345⟩. ⟨halshs-01349135⟩
- Enika Abazi, Albert Doja. International representations of Balkan wars: a socio-anthropological account in international relations perspective. Cambridge Review of International Affairs, Taylor & Francis (Routledge), 2016, 29 (2), pp. 581–610. ⟨10.1080/09557571.2015.1118998⟩. ⟨halshs-01277214⟩
- Enika Abazi, Albert Doja. From the communist point of view: Cultural hegemony and folkloric manipulation in Albanian studies under socialism. Communist and Post-Communist Studies, Elsevier, 2016, 49 (2), pp. 163–178. ⟨10.1016/j.postcomstud.2016.04.002⟩. ⟨halshs-01309745⟩
- Albert Doja. From the native point of view: An insider/outsider perspective on folkloric archaism and modern anthropology in Albania. History of the Human Sciences, SAGE Publications, 2015, 28 (4), pp. 44–75. ⟨10.1177/0952695115594099⟩. ⟨halshs-01214230⟩
- Albert Doja. From the German-speaking point of view: Unholy Empire, Balkanism, and the culture circle particularism of Albanian studies. Critique of Anthropology, SAGE Publications, 2014, 34 (3), pp. 290–326. ⟨10.1177/0308275X14531834⟩. ⟨halshs-01133422⟩
- Albert Doja. Socializing Enchantment: a socio-anthropological approach to infant-directed singing, music education and cultural socialization. International Review of the Aesthetics and Sociology of Music, JSTOR, 2014, 45 (1), pp. 115–147. JSTOR:23758170 ⟨halshs-01018755⟩
- Albert Doja. Fertility Trends, Marriage Patterns and Savant Typologies in Albanian Context. Journal of Family History, SAGE Publications, 2010, 35 (4), pp. 346–367. ⟨10.1177/0363199010381045⟩. ⟨halshs-00516607⟩
- Albert Doja. Social Thought & Commentary: Rethinking the Couvade. Anthropological Quarterly, George Washington University, Institute for Ethnographic Research, 2005, 78 (4), pp. 917–950. ⟨10.1353/anq.2005.0053⟩. ⟨halshs-00406278⟩
- Albert Doja. Morphologie traditionnelle de la société albanaise. Social Anthropology, Wiley, 1999, 7 (1), pp. 37–55. ⟨10.1111/j.1469-8676.1999.tb00177.x⟩. ⟨halshs-00406287⟩
