= Academy of Sciences of Albania =

Scientific institution

Akademia e Shkencave e Shqipërisë
- Abbreviation: ASH / ASA (English)
- Formation: 10 October 1972 (54 years ago)
- Type: National academy
- Purpose: Science
- Headquarters: Tirana, Albania
- Coordinates: 41°19′35″N 19°49′22″E
- Members: Academicians (Full members, Associated members, Honorary members, Emeritus members, Correspondent members)
- President: Skënder Gjinushi
- Main organ: Presidency of the Academy
- Website: akad.gov.al

The Academy of Sciences of Albania (Albanian: Akademia e Shkencave e Shqipërisë), founded in 1972, is the most important scientific institution in Albania. In the 1980s, several research institutes began at the University of Tirana were transferred to the Academy's jurisdiction. The institution includes the most distinguished scientists, also called "academics", that are involved in research centers and other organisations inside and outside Albania. As of 2009, the Academy had 23 regular members, 10 associated members, one permanent member, and 26 honor members.

The Academy was among several dozen of the world's scientific academies which endorsed through signature the Summit Statement emerging from the New Delhi Population Summit of 1994.

The Academy is housed in a former palace of King Zog.

== Organization ==
In 2023, the Academy of Albanological Studies was integrated into the Academy of Sciences, while the latter was reorganized.

=== Institutions and Centres ===
- Institute of Archeology
- Institute of History
- Institute of Linguistics and Literature
- Institute of Anthropology
- Centre for Art Studies
- Centre for Encyclopedic and Albanological Publications

=== Temporary Research Units ===
- Biotechnology and Genetics
- Geophysics
- Water Resources
- Geosciences and Geoengineering
- Artificial Intelligence
- NanoAlb
- Energy
- National Institute of Physics
- National Institute of Mathematics
- Research and Study Unit for the Arbëresh, Arvanites, and Arbënesh
- Scientific Research Center for Biotechnology and Genetics

The Academy of Sciences of Albania has the country's largest academic library. Founded in 1975 starting with 10,000 volumes, it included 812,000 volumes by 1986.

In 2008, funding for most research functions of the academy was withdrawn, those research functions subsequently transferred to universities and research centers. Four research institutes which were separated from the Academy joined to form the Centre of Albanological Studies.

International relations

The Academy of Sciences of Albania engages in international scientific cooperation through memberships in several pan-European and global umbrella organizations. It is a member of ALLEA (All European Academies), the European Federation of Academies of Sciences and Humanities, and the Union Académique Internationale (UAI), through which it represents Albanian research in the humanities and social sciences. Globally, the academy participates in scientific initiatives and policy-advisory frameworks as a member of the International Science Council (ISC) and the InterAcademy Partnership (IAP).

The academy also cooperates in agricultural, food, and environmental sciences through the Union of European Academies for Sciences Applied to Agriculture, Food and Nature (UEAA). It hosted the UEAA's 13th General Assembly in Tirana and holds the organization's presidency for the 2026–2028 term, led by an Albanian academician. In addition to these multilateral networks, the institution maintains bilateral partnerships and scientific exchange agreements with numerous national academies across Europe, focusing primarily on neighboring countries in the Western Balkans and Western Europe.

== Notable current and past members ==
=== Regular members ===
- Skënder Gjinushi
- Albert Doja
- Fatos Kongoli
- Beqir Meta
- Vasil Tole
- Kosta Barjaba
- Aurela Anastasi
- Floresha Dado
- Nazim Gruda
- Anesti Kondili
- Efigjeni Kongjika
- Arben Merkoçi
- Petraq Petro
- Bashim Resuli
- Xhevahir Spahiu
- Jani Vangjeli
- Floran Vila
- Marenglen Verli
- Anila Paparisto

=== Emeriti members ===
- Muzafer Korkuti
- Rexhep Mejdani
- Bardhyl Golemi

=== Associate members ===
- Arian Durrësi
- Shaban Sinani

=== Honorary members ===
- Idriz Ajeti
- Ali Aliu (deceased)
- Francesco Altimari
- Jean Aubouin
- Alain Ducellier
- Bernd Jürgen Fischer
- Victor Friedman
- Eric P. Hamp
- Mark Krasniqi (deceased)
- Mateja Matevski (deceased)
- Andrea Pieroni
- Rexhep Qosja
- Luan Starova
- Răzvan Theodorescu

=== Notable past members ===
- Eqrem Çabej
- Shaban Demiraj
- Mentor Përmeti
- Jorgo Bulo
- Luan Omari

== Former notable presidents ==
- Aleks Buda
- Shaban Demiraj

== Periodicals ==
- Studia Albanica, ISSN 0585-5047.
- AJNTS - Albanian Journal of Natural and Technical Sciences, ISSN 2074-0867.
