= Bernd Jürgen Fischer =

20th and 21st-century American historian

- Born: January 27, 1952 (age 74); Bunde, Germany

Academic background
- Education: University of California, Santa Barbara

Academic work
- Main interests: History of Albania

Bernd Jürgen Fischer (born 27 January 1952) is a historian and professor of history at Indiana University-Purdue University Fort Wayne. He received his Ph.D. in 1982 from the University of California, Santa Barbara. He was elected to the Albanian Academy of Science in 2006 and in 2007, he was appointed to position of special advisor to the Albanian Royal Court.

== Selected works ==
- King Zog and the struggle for stability in Albania. 1984 by East European Monographs
- Albania at war, 1939–1945, West Lafayette, Ind.: Purdue University Press, 1999, ISBN 9780585063881, OCLC 42922446
- "Kollaborationsregime in Albanien, 1939-1944" in Europe unterm Hakenkreuz- Okkupation und Kollaboration, 1938-1945.
- Balkan Strongmen: Dictators and Authoritarian Rulers of Southeast Europe, Published November 2006 by C Hurst & Co Publishers Ltd]
- Albanian Identities: Myth and History, coauthor with Stephanie Schwandner-Sievers, Published September 30, 2002 by Indiana University Press
- A Concise History of Albania, coauthor with Oliver Jens Schmitt, Published 2022 by Cambridge University Press

== Sources ==
- Elsie, Robert (March 19, 2010). Historical Dictionary of Albania. Scarecrow Press. ISBN 978-0-8108-7380-3.
