= Nevruz in Albania =

Iranian new year as celebrated in Albania

Nevruz Day is celebrated annually in Albania on 22 March as Sultan Nevruz. In Albania, the festival commemorates the birthday of Ali ibn Abi Talib (died 661 CE) and simultaneously the advent of spring. Declared a public holiday in 1996, it is prominent amongst the nation's Bektashis (because of their Shia affiliations), but adherents of Sunnism, Catholicism, and Orthodoxy also "share in the Nevruz festival to respect the ecumenical spirit of Albania". Amongst these three non-Bektashis, the Sunni community of Albania appears to be greatest supporter of Nevruz. The "League of Imams in Albania" though, is opposed to the festivity, and they call it a pagan festival with pagan origins; they believe that only the festivals of Eid al-Fitr and the Eid al-Adha should be celebrated. Proselytism funded by Wahhabis and Saudis contributed to the spreading of this Islamic interpretation, which, although not necessarily fundamentalist, "strongly disapproves of Baktāshi rituals and practices considered alien to Islam, including the Nevruz".

According to Gianfranco Bria:

The Baktāshis claim to have adopted an ecumenical nationalist rhetoric to achieve a path of accommodation (at most, negotiation) with the secular and multi-confessional roots of Albanian civil religion. In this sense, the celebration of the Nevruz by Baktāshis aims to achieve two goals. The first is to legitimize the monopoly of so-called mysticism within Albanian society, incorporating everything that could be seen as esoteric and/or new-age to portray ‘Albanian ecumenical peculiarity’. The second is to involve the highest number of believers, especially the young (the majority of the population) who have grown up in a post-secular society and are fascinated by western socio-economic models, by mixing the Baktāshi tradition with progressive scientific and political rationalism.

== During the 1990s ==
On the occasion of the Nevruz festival of 1991, the Kryegjyshata (Bektashi headquarters) in Tirana was reopened after the Communist period, in a moving ceremony that was attended by Mother Teresa. During the Nevruz festival of 1999, Naim Frashëri (1846 – 1900), the prominent Albanian writer and patriot of the Albanian national movement, who was also a Bektashi, was nearly canonised as "Baba of Honor".

== International influence ==
Prominent Bektashi figureheads have organized public celebrations of Nevruz and Ashura, in order to "forge a link between creed, nation and progressivism". Some foreign factors, such as the Iranian Embassy in Albania and some Alevi networks, have often voiced support for these public initiatives and rituals. The Iranian government is known to have given cultural and political support in order to extend its own influence in the Balkans, without, however, affecting Bektashi autonomy.

== Sources ==
- Algar, Hamid (1989). "BEKTĀŠĪYA". In Yarshater, Ehsan (ed.). Encyclopædia Iranica. Vol. IV/2: Behruz–Bibliographies II. London and New York: Routledge & Kegan Paul. pp. 118–122. ISBN 978-0-71009-125-3.
- Bria, Gianfranco (2019). "Post-Socialist Sufi Revival in Albania: Public Marginality or Spiritual Privatisation?". Journal of Muslims in Europe. 8 (3). doi:10.1163/22117954-12341401.
- Bria, Gianfranco (2020). "Celebrating Sultan Nevruz: Between Theological Debate and Multi-Framed Practice in Contemporary Albania". Studia Islamica. 114 (3): 355–377. doi:10.1163/19585705-12341400.
- Elsie, Robert (2019). The Albanian Bektashi: History and Culture of a Dervish Order in the Balkans. Bloomsbury Publishing. ISBN 9781788315715.
