= Independence Day (Albania) =

Public holiday celebrated on 28 November

- Official name: Independence Day
- Also called: Independence Day
- Observed by: Albania
- Type: National
- Significance: The day in 1912 that the Declaration of Independence was adopted in Vlora
- Date: 28 November
- Next time: 28 November 2026
- Frequency: annual

Independence Day (Albanian: Dita e Pavarësisë) is a public holiday in Albania observed on 28 November. It commemorates the Albanian Declaration of Independence (from the Ottoman Empire), which was ratified by the All-Albanian Congress on 28 November 1912, establishing the state of Albania.

== Significance ==
Independence Day is celebrated every 28 November as a holiday in Albania,. It refers to the Albanian Declaration of Independence on 28 November 1912 and the raising of the Albanian flag in Vlora by Ismail Qemali. It coincides with the day in which Skanderbeg raised the same flag in Krujë, on 28 November 1443.

== History ==
The Albanian struggle for independence dates back to the 15th century, when Ottomans first took control of Albanian land. Most historians argue that the actual struggle for independence came with the development of Albanian nationalism in the 19th century. This spark emerged particularly among their diaspora in Southern Italy, the descendants of Albanians who fled after the death of Skandberg in the 15th century.

== See also ==
- 100th Anniversary of the Independence of Albania
- 2017 Independence Cup (Albania)
