= Albanology =

Science that studies Albanian language and culture

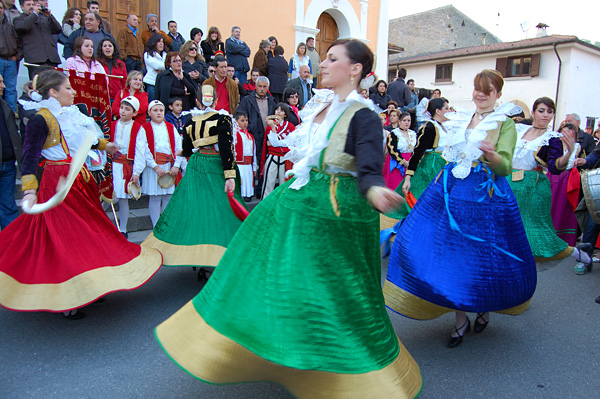
Albanian folk dance from Civita, Calabria, Italy

Albanology, also known as Albanian studies, is an interdisciplinary branch of the humanities that addresses the language, costume, literature, art, culture and history of Albanians. Within the studies the scientific methods of literature, linguistics, archeology, history and culture are used. However the Albanian language is the main point of research of the studies.

== Studies ==
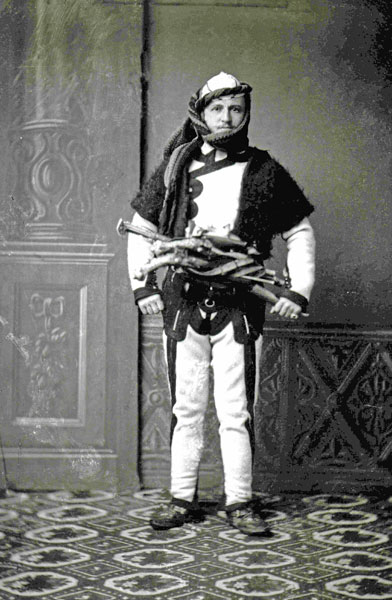
Austrian Theodor Ippen in Shkodër with traditional costume. (1900)

Johann Erich Thunmann in the 18th century was probably the first Albanologist. He supported the theory of the autochthony of the Albanians and also presented the Illyrian origin theory. Later on Gustav Meyer proved that the Albanian language was part of the Indo-European family.

In the 20th century such studies were deepened by Norbert Jokl, Milan Šufflay, and Franz Nopcsa von Felső-Szilvás, as well as Karl Reinhold, and Eqrem Çabej.

The studies of Albanology were more institutionally supported in Albania starting in 1940 with the opening of the Royal Institute of the Albanian Studies, which had preceded the Academy of Sciences of Albania, opened in 1972. Meanwhile, during the 1960s, the Albanology Institute of Pristina was also reconstructed in Kosovo, then part of Yugoslavia. The institute emerged from its core founded in 1953.

== Notable Albanologists ==
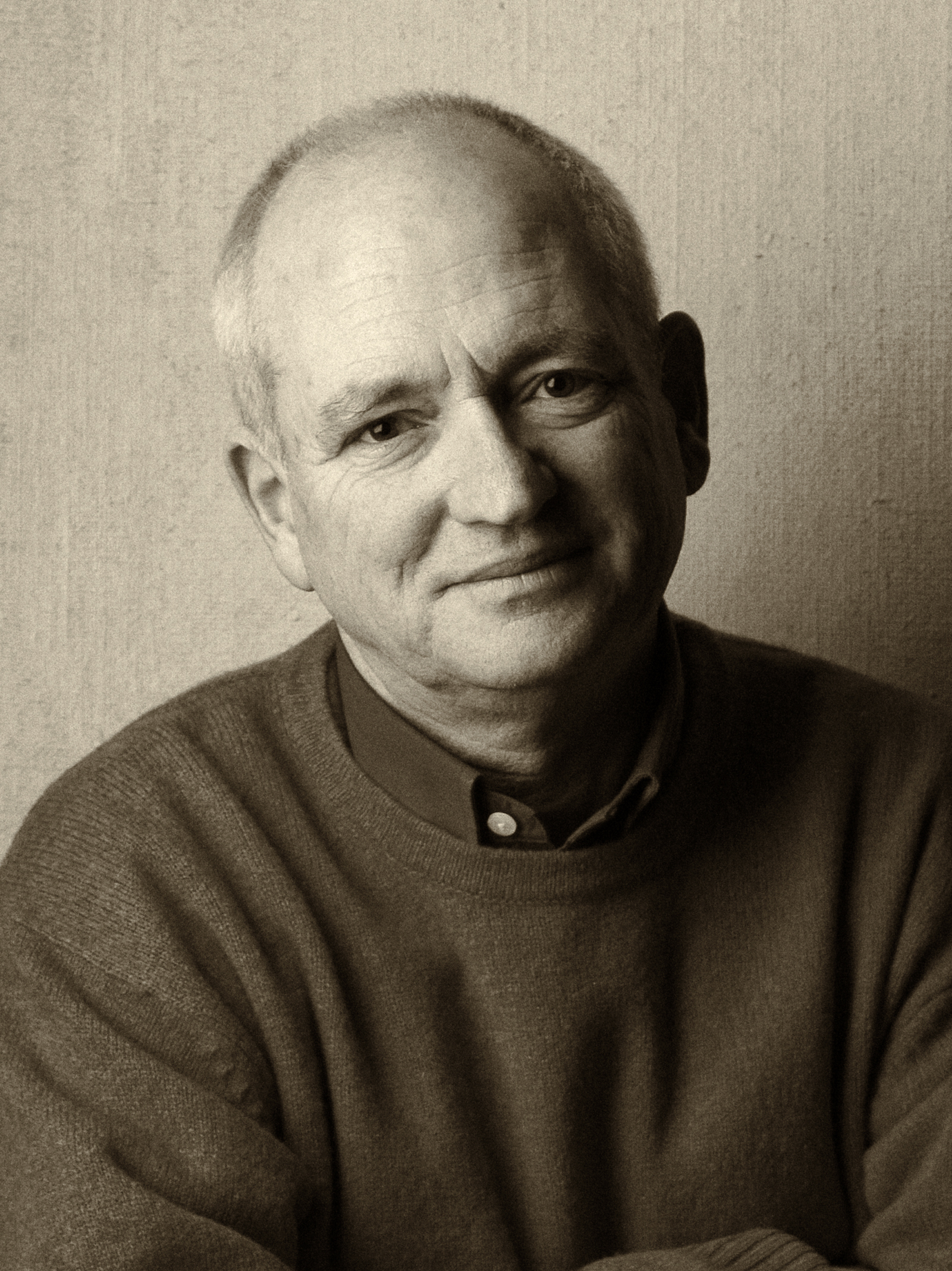
Robert Elsie was the foremost scholar of Albanian studies in the early 21st century.

=== Albanian-born ===
- Demetrio Franco (1443–1525)
- Ndoc Nikaj (1864–1951)
- Gjergj Pekmezi (1872–1938)
- Fan Noli (1882–1965)
- Costa Chekrezi (1892–1959)
- Tahir Dizdari (1900–1972)
- Tajar Zavalani (1903–1966)
- Stavro Skëndi (1905–1989)
- Eqrem Çabej (1908–1980)
- Namik Resuli (1908–1985)
- Selman Riza (1909–1988)
- Aleks Buda (1910–1993)
- Petro Janura (1911–1983)
- Mahir Domi (1915–2000)
- Dhimitër Shuteriqi (1915–2003)
- Idriz Ajeti (1917–2019)
- Shaban Demiraj (1920–2014)
- Mark Krasniqi (1920–2015)
- Androkli Kostallari (1922–1992)
- Mehdi Bardhi (1927–1994)
- Jashar Rexhepagiq (1929–2010)
- Petro Zheji (1929–2015)
- Besim Bokshi (1930–2014)
- Skënder Rizaj (1930–2021)
- Fehmi Agani (1932–1999)
- Muzafer Korkuti (*1936)
- Rexhep Qosja (1936–2026)
- Jorgo Bulo (1939–2015)
- Anton Berisha (*1946)
- Aurel Plasari (*1956)

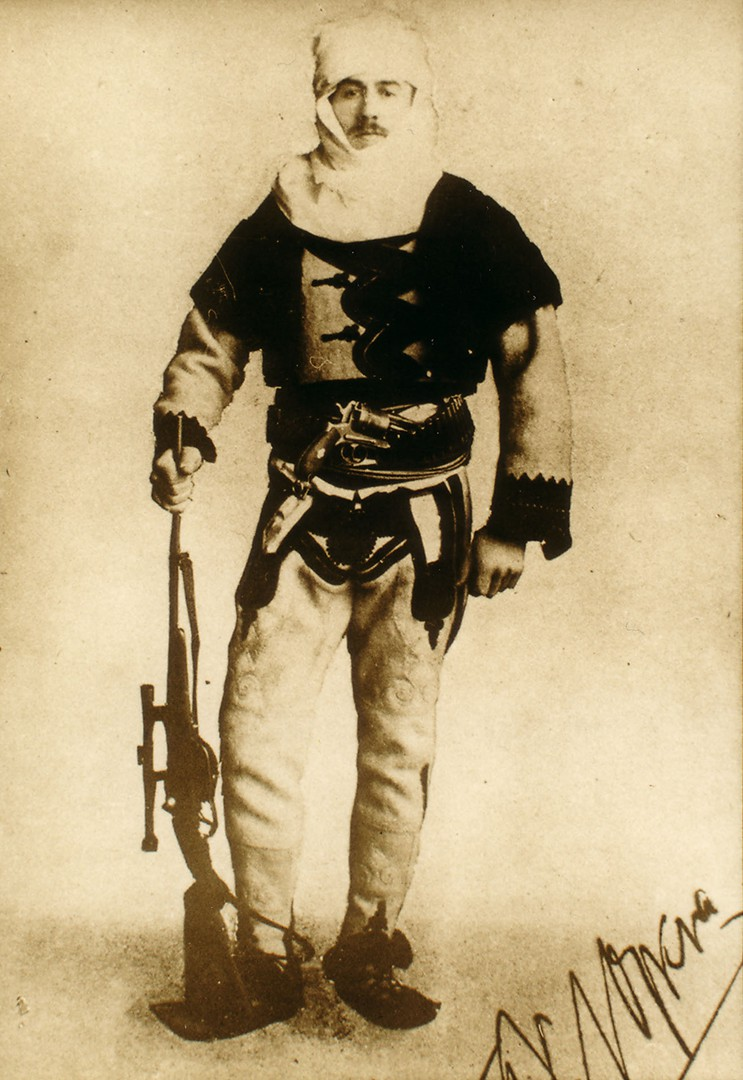
The famous Hungarian paleontologist Baron Nopcsa von Felső-Szilvás in Albanian uniform.

=== Foreign-born ===
- Henrik Barić (1888–1957)
- Marcin Bielski (1495–1575)
- Johann Erich Thunmann (1746–1778)
- François Pouqueville (1770–1838)
- William Martin Leake (1777–1860)
- Jakob Philipp Fallmerayer (1790–1861)
- Joseph von Xylander (1794–1854)
- Johann Georg von Hahn (1811–1869)
- Karl Reinhold (1834–1880)
- Vikentij Makušev (1837–1883)
- Jan Urban Jarník (1848–1923)
- Gustav Meyer (1850–1900)
- Lajos Thallóczy (1857–1916)
- Alexandru Philippide (1859–1933)
- Theodor Anton Ippen (1861–1935)
- Carl Patsch (1865–1945)
- Antonio Baldacci (1867–1950)
- Holger Pedersen (1867–1953)
- Nicolae Iorga (1871–1940)
- Mario Roques (1875–1961)
- Norbert Jokl (1877–1942)
- Franz Nopcsa von Felső-Szilvás (1877–1933)
- Milan Šufflay (1879–1931)
- Maximilian Lambertz (1882–1963)
- Marco La Piana (1883–1958)
- Margaret Hasluck (1885–1948)
- Jacques Bourcart (1891–1965)
- Giuseppe Valentini (1900–1979)
- Georg Stadtmüller (1909–1985)
- Agniya Desnitskaya (1912–1992)
- Wacław Cimochowski (1912–1982)
- Vangelis Liapis (1914–2008)
- Eric P. Hamp (1920–2019)
- Aleksandar Stipčević (1930–2015)
- Wilfried Fiedler (1933–2019)
- Peter Schubert (1938–2003)
- Peter Bartl (1938–2022)
- Robert Elsie (1950–2017)
- Vladimir Orel (1952–2007)
- James Pettifer (*1949)
- Pasquale Scutari (*1952)
- Francesco Altimari (*1955)
- Noel Malcolm (*1956)
- Matteo Mandalà (*1958)
- Marko Snoj (*1959)
- Joachim Matzinger (*1968)
- Armin Hetzer (*1941)
- Oliver Schmitt (*1973)

== See also ==
- Historiography of Albania
- Balkan studies
