= Barić =

Barić is a Croatian surname. People with the name include:

- Gordan Barić (born 1994), Croatian footballer
- Henrik Barić (1888–1957), Croatian linguist and Albanologist
- Hrvoje Barić (born 1965), Croatian former swimmer
- Lana Barić (born 1979), Croatian actress
- Mario Barić (born 1985), Bosnian Croat footballer
- Otto Barić (1933–2020), Austrian-Croatian football player and manager

== See also ==
- Baric, surname
- Barič (surname)
- Bajrić
