= Lasgush Poradeci =

Albanian philologist, poet and writer

HON Lasgush Poradeci
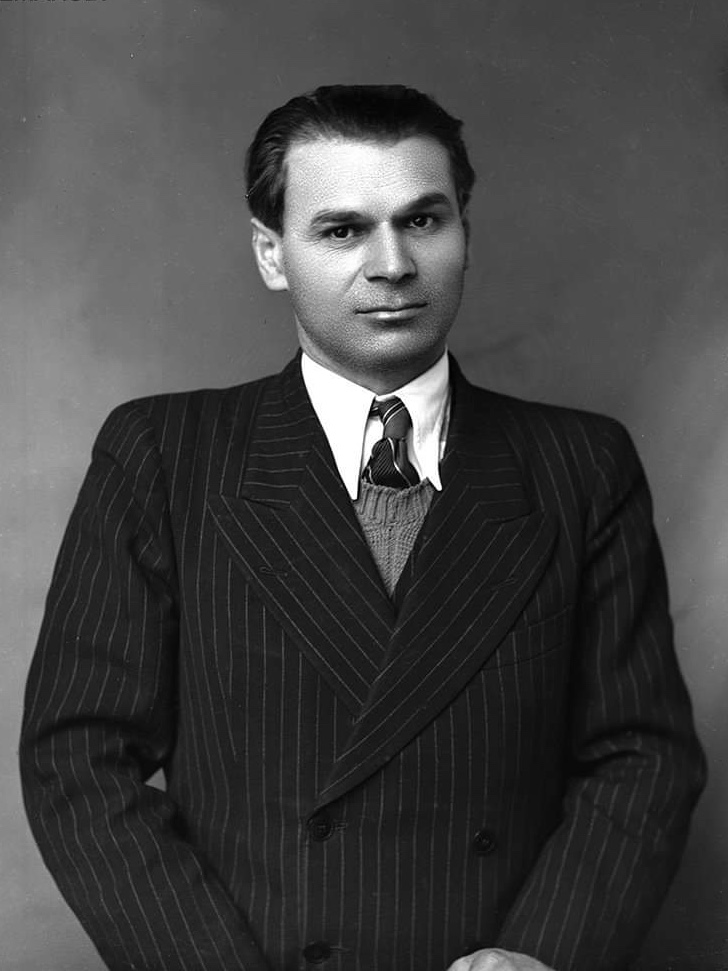
- Portrait of Lasgush Poradeci by Geg Marubi, 1938
- Born: Llazar Sotir Gusho; 27 December 1899; Pogradec, Ottoman Empire (modern Albania)
- Died: 12 November 1987 (aged 87); Tirana, Albania
- Education: University of Graz
- Occupations: Philologist; poet; translator; writer
- Writing career
- Pen name: Lasgush Poradeci (Note: Las-Gush from his name and surname, and Poradeci form his birthplace Pogradeci, which the author referred to as Poradec.)
- Language: Albanian; Greek; French; Romanian; German
- Genres: Romanticism; Realism

Llazar Sotir Gusho (pronounced [ɫaˈzar sɔˈtiɾ guˈʃo]; 27 December 1899 – 12 November 1987), commonly known by the pen name Lasgush Poradeci, was an Albanian philologist, poet, translator, writer and pioneer of modern Albanian literature. He is regarded as one of the most influential Albanian writers of the 20th century whose works are directly connected with Romanticism and Realism.

Born in the small town of Pogradec on the Lake of Ohrid, then in the Ottoman Empire, he completed his primary education at an Albanian school and his secondary education in Monastir (Bitola) and at Lycée Léonin in Athens, subsequently receiving his academic education at the universities of Bucharest and Graz. He developed and maintained close liaison with Asdreni, Ernest Koliqi, Gjergj Fishta and Mitrush Kuteli, all of whom became amongst the most outstanding Albanian writers of that time.

Poradeci is best remembered for his poetry collections Vallja e yjve and Ylli i zemrës inspired by the traditions and peculiarities of Albanian life. His style is characterised for its stylistic and technical achievement, its form and content as well as its engagement with nature, eroticism and philosophy. He notably translated several major English, French, German, Italian and Russian works into Albanian.

== Biography ==
=== Life and career ===
Lasgush Poradeci was born on 27 December 1899 in the town of Pogradec at the western coast of the Lake of Ohrid in what was then part of the Ottoman Empire, now Republic of Albania. In his native town he properly received his primary formal education at an Albanian primary school and attended the Romanian High School of Bitola (Monastir) upon his completion from 1906 to 1916.

During the First World War, Poradeci's father, despite the tenuous relations between Albanians and Greeks in southeastern Albania at that time, directed him to Greece to continue his education, on the condition that he would not study at a Greek institution. He therefore attended the French Lycée Léonin in Athens until 1920. In Athens, he spent his last two years in a sanatorium for health reasons to which, despite his desperate financial situation, he was referred with the assistance of Sophia Schliemann.

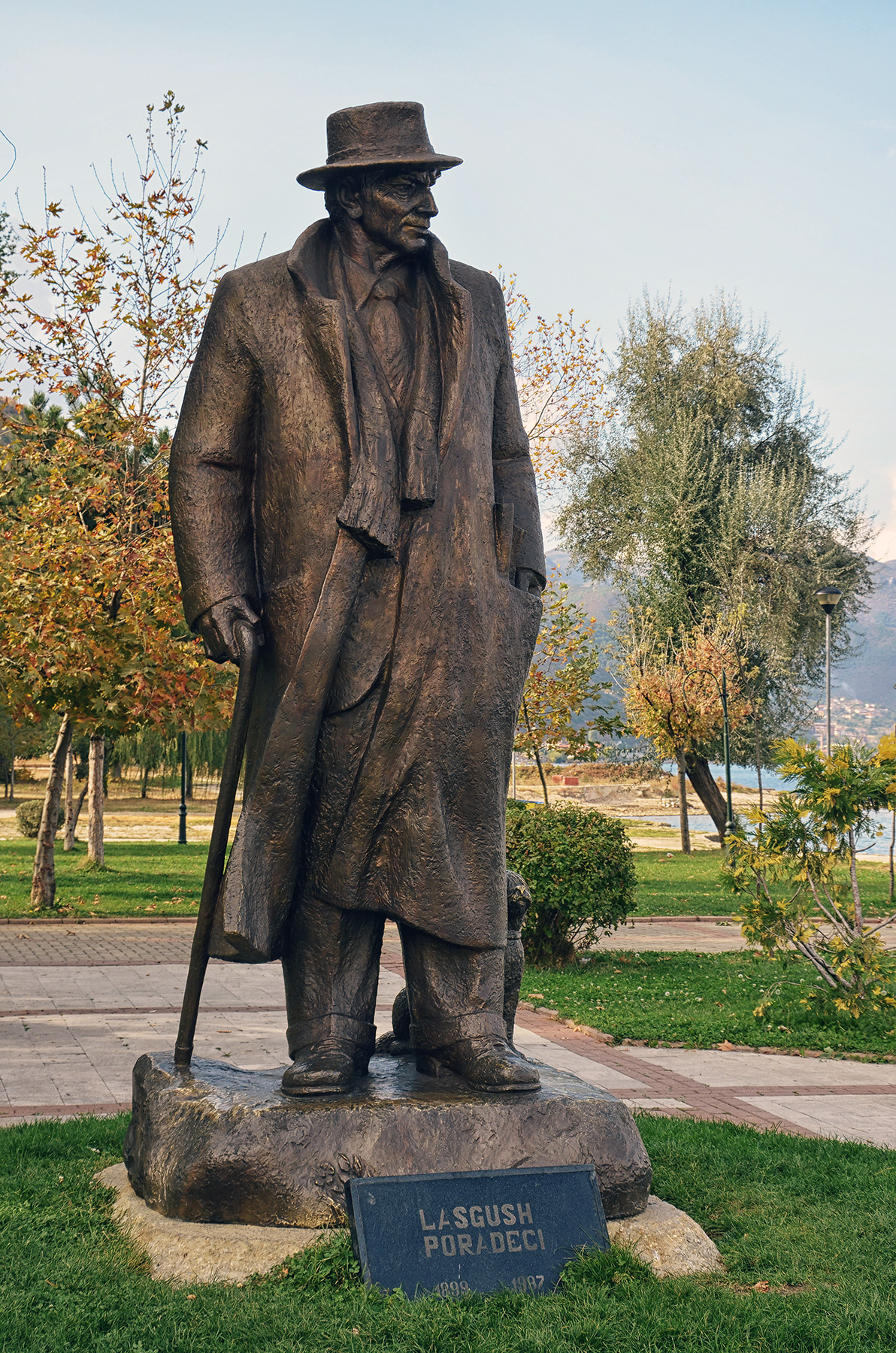
A statue dedicated to Lasgush Poradeci in Pogradec on the Lake of Ohrid.

Although not completely recovered, Poradeci migrated to Bucharest after one year and rejoined his brother. In Bucharest, he enrolled at the University of Arts and entered the Albanian association for the Albanian diaspora of Romania later being elected its secretary. It was in the city that he met his fellows Asdreni, Mitrush Kuteli and numerous other Romanian poets and writers.

In 1924, Fan Noli awarded Poradeci a scholarship to continue his higher education abroad. He immediately left for Berlin, where he hoped to study under Albanologist Norbert Jokl, and continued on to the University of Graz whereas he attended the Faculty of Romano-German philology and finished a doctorate there in 1933.

In the 1930s he is purported to have had an affair with the painter Androniqi Zengo Antoniu.

Poradeci voluntarily returned to Albania the following year to teach arts at a secondary school in Tirana. From 1944 to 1947, he subsequently became unemployed within a period characterised by the end of the Second World War and the beginning of the Communism in Albania. He lived with his wife in Tirana on the latter's meagre salary as a teacher. After brief employment at the Institute of Science, forerunner of the University of Tirana, he translated literature for the state-owned Naim Frashëri publishing company until his retirement in 1974. He died in poverty at his home in Tirana on 12 November 1987.

=== Writings and publications ===
Lasgush Poradeci was undoubtedly fascinated by the aesthetics of nature. Visible in his poem Poradeci, he admired the environment of his beloved hometown Pogradec at the Lake of Ohrid which never ceased to fascinate and enchant him. His poetic creations are based on the four elements, earth, water, air and fire, which are the essential themes in his poetry. He further divided poetry between landscape poems, love poems and philosophical poems while all his poems are essentially meditative-philosophical.

Morning

Within the breast the dark heart sleeps:
The lake within the mountains' clasp.
Reflected far down in its deeps
The night is drowned with empty gasp.

I see the death, I see the pain;
Those eyes of hers, deep blue the shade,
Those eyes of hers that blink and strain,
Are stars that glimmer once and fade.

Beneath the surface, dawn's first ray
now gleams and hints at life to be;
Unseen, the daystar shrinks away,
A grain of sugar in the sea.

Look there! Look there! The day is born -
The water cracks - a pelican's beak
Has like a herald of the morn
Just pierced the sky in lightning streak.

— (trans. Wilton)

He composed two extraordinary collections of poetry including Vallja e yjve and Ylli i zemrës both published in Romania in 1933 and 1937 respectively. His poetry is far away from being Romantic and engaging compared to the poetry of the Albanian Renaissance. It is characterised by deep thoughts, labyrinthine feelings and powerful universal ideas.

During the same period, he contributed verses to the Albanian weekly newspaper Shqipëri' e re (New Albania). Other Poradeci works include "The theological excursion of Socrates", "About to", "Kamadeva", "Ballads of Muharrem" and "Reshit Collaku". The entire work that Lasgush Poradeci made was all about Pogradec, his birthplace.

Poradeci's complete works were published in 1989.

Poradeci was also active in translating several notable international literary works into the Albanian language.

== See also ==
- List of Albanian writers
- Albanians of Romania
- Albanian League of Writers and Artists
