= Namik Resuli =

Albanian linguist and academic

Namik Resuli (10 September 1908 – 12 September 1985) was an Albanian linguist and academic.

== Biography ==
Born in Berat in 1908, after having accomplished elementary studies in Albania he went to Italy, where he finished his secondary studies and then graduated in glottology in the University of Turin. His doctorate thesis "Mbi shtresëzimet në gjuhën shqipe" was written under the guide of Professor Matteo Bartoli. Resuli returned in Albania in the 1930s and taught Albanian language in Elbasan Normal School, now Aleksandër Xhuvani University, as well as in Shkodër and Tirana. In 1939, he went to Rome to become assistant professor of Albanian language, working there for 10 years. During 1940–44 he worked in the Ministry of Education of Albania, for a period also Deputy Minister of Education, and as a member of the Royal Institute of the Albanian Studies. Together with Ernest Koliqi, he published a two-volume collection on Albanian literature, titled Shkrimtaret Shqiptare (Albanian writers), in 1941.

During 1948-1957 he was a member of the International Center of Albanian Studies in Palermo, and in 1955 he became professor of Albanian language in the Università degli Studi di Napoli "L'Orientale" until 1971. In 1954 he published in Turin the magazine Shpirti Shqiptar (Albanian Soul). He died on 12 September 1985 in Turin.

== Works ==
His study on the Missal (Meshari) of Gjon Buzuku (Città del Vaticano, 1958) is the first of its genre in the history of Albanology, whereas his work Grammatica della lingua albanese (Bologna, 1985) is considered an important approach in teaching the Albanian language to foreigner speakers.
He was of the opinion that the standard Albanian language would naturally lean toward the dialects of Central Albania.
