= Bourcart =

Bourcart is a French surname. Notable people with the surname include:

- Jacques Bourcart (1891–1965), French oceanographer and geologist
- Jean-Christian Bourcart (born 1960), French photographer and filmmaker
