= Wacław Cimochowski =

Polish philologist

Wacław Cimochowski (December 22, 1912 in Kursk – July 4, 1982 in Gdynia, Poland) was a Polish philologist who specialized in Indo-European linguistics, especially in Albanology.

== Career ==
Cimochowski studied linguistics at Stefan Batory University, where his teacher was among others Jan Otrębski. He also studied in Vienna, where he was specialized in Albanian (with Norbert Jokl) and in Sanskrit.

During World War II, he worked as a railroad and construction industries. From 1945-1948 he worked at the State Office of repatriation in Lublin.

In 1948 he obtained a doctoral degree from Poznań University. The promoter was John Otrębski. His work on Dushmani dialect was originally prepared before 1939 in the German language. The description of Dushmani village dialect was also the first full description of the non-literary types of the Albanian language.

In the years 1948-1955 (and later from 1960 to 1972) he was employed at University. From 1954 to 1978 he worked at the Nicolaus Copernicus University in Toruń. There he directed the Department of General Linguistics. Twice (1962–1964 and 1969–1972) he served as Dean of the Faculty of Humanities at the university. He also worked with the College of Education in Gdańsk (1957–1960).

Among his academic achievements there are a number of papers on the origin and historical development of the Albanian language. Some of his works were published in Volume Albanica Studies (edited by prof. Irena Sawicka).

He died in Gdynia, was buried in the Mały Kack cemetery.

== Writings ==
- "Recherches sur l'histoire du sandhi dans la langue albanaise", Lingua Posnaniensis 2 (1950): 220–255.
- "Albanischen Etymologien", Lingua Posnaniensis 3 (1951): 158–168.
- Le dialecte de Dushmani: Déscription de l'un des parlers de l'Albanie du Nord. Posnán: Poznańskie Towarzystwo Przyjaciól Nauk, 1951.
- "Zur albanischen Wortforschung", Lingua Posnaniensis 4 (1952): 189–210.
- "Prejardhja e gjuhës shqipe" [The predecessor of the Albanian language], Buletin i universitetit shtetëror të Tiranës, seria e shkencave shoqërore 12, no. 2 (1958): 37–53.
- "Des recherches sur la toponomastique de l'Albanie", Lingua Posnaniensis 8 (1960): 133–145.
- "Pozicioni gjuhësor i ilirishtes ballkanike në rrethin e gjuhëve indoevropiane", Studime Filologjike 2 (1973).
- "Die albanischen Präsensbildung auf -io und -nio", in Studia indoeuropejskie – Études indo-européennes. Krakow: Zakład narodowy im. Ossolińskich : Wyd. Polskiej Akademii nauk, 1974, pp. 43–48.

== Sources ==
1. Sławomir Kalembka (red.): Pracownicy nauki i dydaktyki Uniwersytetu Mikołaja Kopernika 1945-2004. Materiały do biografii. Toruń: Wydawnictwo Uniwersytetu Mikołaja Kopernika, 2006, s. 146. ISBN 83-231-1988-0.

== Bibliography ==
- Leszek Bednarczuk, Profesor Wacław Cimochowski, Acta Baltico-Slavica XVII: 1987, s.11-15
- Jan Bełkot, Wacław Cimochowski, w: Toruński Słownik Biograficzny, tom IV (pod redakcją Krzysztofa Mikulskiego), Towarzystwo Miłośników Torunia, Uniwersytet Mikołaja Kopernika w Toruniu, Toruń 2004, s. 51-52 (z fotografią)
- Studia Albanica II. In memoriam Waclaw Cimochowski Sawicka Irena (red.) ISBN 83-231-1876-0 Wydawnictwo Naukowe Uniwersytetu Mikołaja Kopernika Miejsce wydania: Toruń Rok wydania: 2005
