= Desnitsky =

Desnitsky (Russian: Десницкий), feminine: Desnitskaya is a Russian surname originated in clergy, derived from the biblical expression "стоящий одесную Бога" (<the one> "standing on the right side of God", i.e., God the Son). Notable people with the surname include:

- Agniya Desnitskaya (1912–1992), Soviet linguist
- Ivan Desny, born Ivan Desnitcky (1922–2002), French actor of Russian Chinese origin
- Mikhail Desnitsky (1761–1821), Russian Orthodox bishop
- Semyon Desnitsky (1740–1789), Russian legal scholar
- Sergey Desnitsky (born 1941), Soviet and Russian film and stage actor
- Yekaterina Desnitskaya (1886–1960), Russian Empire-born nurse who became a princess as wife of the Siamese prince Chakrabongse Bhuvanath
