= Georg Stadtmüller =

German historian (1909–1985)

- Born: 17 March 1909; Bürstadt, Hessen
- Died: 1 November 1985 (aged 76); Passau

Academic work
- Main interests: German history, classic and oriental philology and Albanology

Georg Stadtmüller (Bürstadt, Hessen, 17 March 1909 – Passau, 1 November 1985) was a German historian and Albanologist.

== Biography ==
He studied German history, classic and oriental philology and history at the University of Freiburg from 1927 to 1931. He was president of History department at the Ludwig-Maximilians-Universität München, specialist for history of European Orient and history of Albanians. In his 1942 work, he published the controversial thesis in which he traced the origin of Albanians back to the region of Mat. Stadtmüller and later Stavro Skendi supported the controversial assertion about crypto-religious groups existing in the Balkans in all places where the population converted to Islam. Stadtmüller founded the Albanian Institute at the Ludwig-Maximilians-Universität München in 1963. Stadtmüller is the author of the hypothesis that Mat valley was summer pasturage for early Albanians. According to this hypothesis, the Albanian language does not have loan words for flora and fauna that is found above 900m, because this valley is situated above 1,000 m of altitude and is surrounded by mountains, admitting that flora and fauna found in lower ranges have loanwords originating in Slavic languages.

== Selected works ==
- Michael Choniates, Metropolit von Athen. 1934 by Pont. Institutum Orientalium Studiorum
- Georg Stadtmüller; Pontificium Institutum Orientalium Studiorum; Ya'Itopyā 'ortodoks tawāhedo béta kerestiyān; Jacob (of Serug); Sebastian Euringer (1934). De Oriente: documenta, studia et libri ... Pont. Institutum Orientalium Studiorum.
- Forschung zur albanischen Frühgeschichte, Budapest, 1942
- Die Islamisierung bei den Albanern
- Geschichte Südosteuropas, Munich, 1950
- Altheidnischer Volksglaube und Christianisierung in Albanien. Pont. Inst. Orientalium Stud. 1954.
- Das albanische Nationalkonzil vom Jahre 1703, Orientalia Christiana Periodica. XXII (1956),
- Research in Early Albanian History (1942)
- Saeculum. Böhlau Verlag Köln Weimar. 1974. ISSN 0080-5319.
