= Bzenec =

- Town
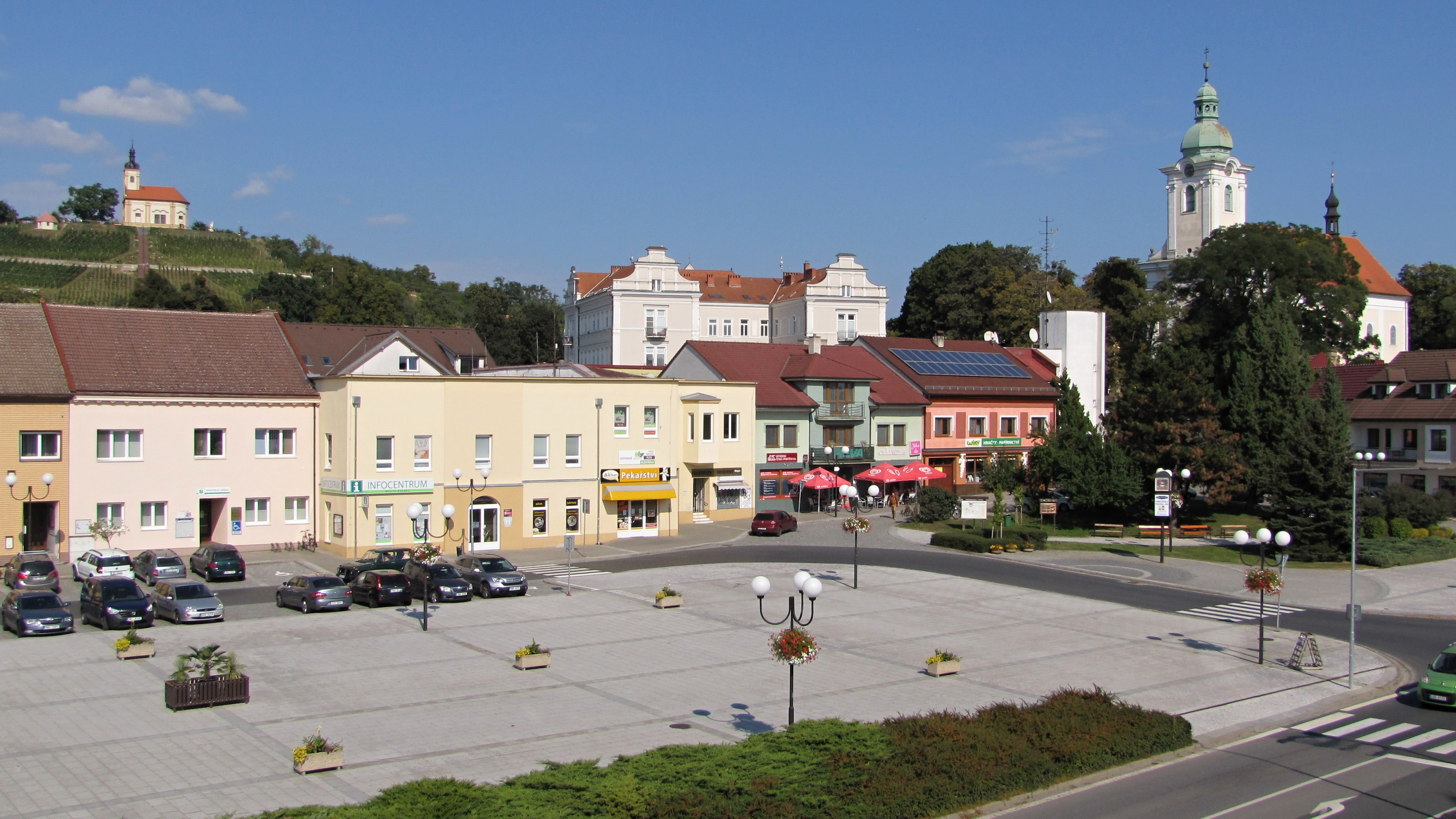
- View of Bzenec centre

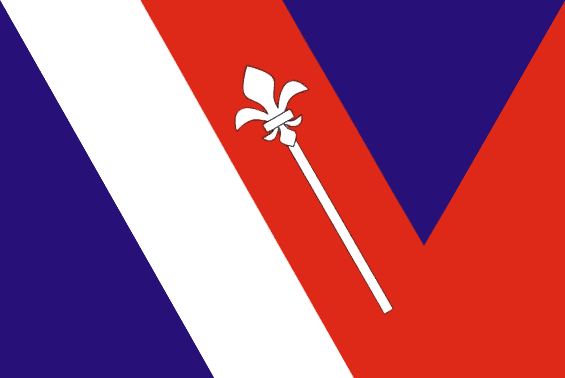
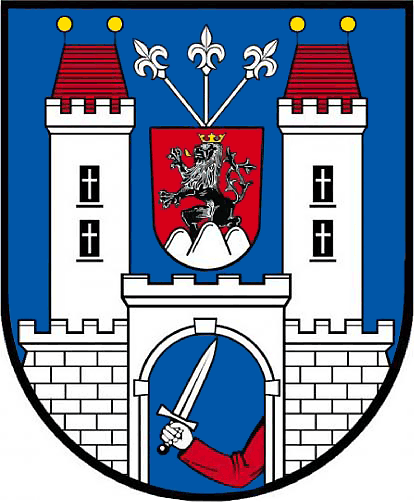
- Flag Coat of arms

- Location in the Czech Republic
- Coordinates: 48°58′24″N 17°16′0″E
- Country: Czech Republic
- Region: South Moravian
- District: Hodonín
- First mentioned: 1231

Government
  - Mayor: Erik Ebringer

Area
  - Total: 40.34 km^{2} (15.58 sq mi)
- Elevation: 183 m (600 ft)

Population (2026-01-01)
  - Total: 4,525
  - Density: 112.2/km^{2} (290.5/sq mi)
- Time zone: UTC+1 (CET)
  - Summer (DST): UTC+2 (CEST)
- Postal code: 696 81
- Website: www.bzenec.cz

Bzenec (Czech pronunciation: [ˈbzɛnɛts]; German: Bisenz) is a town in Hodonín District in the South Moravian Region of the Czech Republic. It has about 4,500 inhabitants. The town is located on the Syrovinka Stream, on the border between the Lower Morava Valley and Kyjov Hills.

Bzenec was founded in the early 11th century at the latest and became a town in 1330 at the latest. The main landmark of the town is the Bzenec Castle, built in the neo-Gothic style. Bzenec is known for viticulture, growing fruit and vinegar production.

== Geography ==
Bzenec is located about 16 kilometres (10 mi) northeast of Hodonín. Larger part of the municipal territory lies in a flat landscape in the Lower Morava Valley. The northern hilly part lies in the Kyjov Hills and include the highest point of Bzenec, Horní hory at 292 m (958 ft) above sea level. The town is situated on the Syrovinka Stream.

== History ==
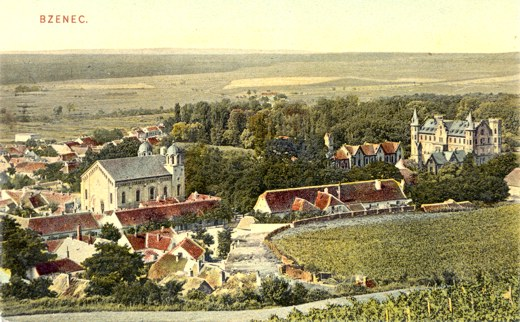
Bzenec with the synagogue on a historical postcard

The first written mention of Bzenec is from 1015, when the local castle called Businc was conquered by Duke Oldřich. Around 1230, Bzenec became a regional centre. In 1330, Bzenec was first referred to as a town. First Jews settled here probably in the second half of the 14th century. The Jewish community belonged to the oldest in Moravia.

The original castle on the hill above the town was badly damaged during the Hussite Wars and demolished in the late 15th century. A new late Gothic fortress was built right in the town. In the 16th century, it was rebuilt into a Renaissance castle. Until 1514, the Bzenec estate was owned by the royal chamber, although it was often pawned.

The first reliable mentions of the Jewish community date back to the 16th century. The Jews were permitted to own vineyards, which, together with the town's convenient location on the trade route, were the reasons why they settled here. In 1605, the town was severely damaged by the army of Stephen Bocskai. Bzenec further suffered during the Thirty Years' War. The Jewish community was completely destroyed. The town recovered only slowly.

When the estate was owned by Count Erdmann Kryštof Pruskovský of Pruskov, the castle was rebuilt in the Baroque style according to the design by Domenico Martinelli in 1709–1710. The castle garden was rebuilt partly into a French formal garden and partly into an English park. In 1852, Count Vilém of Reichenbach had demolished the Baroque castle and had built a new neo-Gothic castle in 1855–1858. As a result, the count became very indebted, which eventually led to his suicide, and the second floor of the castle remained unfinished.

== Demographics ==
Historical population

| Year | Pop. | ±% |
|---|---|---|
| 1869 | 3,874 | — |
| 1880 | 3,756 | −3.0% |
| 1890 | 4,225 | +12.5% |
| 1900 | 4,271 | +1.1% |
| 1910 | 4,468 | +4.6% |

| Year | Pop. | ±% |
|---|---|---|
| 1921 | 4,320 | −3.3% |
| 1930 | 4,562 | +5.6% |
| 1950 | 4,137 | −9.3% |
| 1961 | 4,291 | +3.7% |
| 1970 | 4,013 | −6.5% |

| Year | Pop. | ±% |
|---|---|---|
| 1980 | 4,079 | +1.6% |
| 1991 | 4,113 | +0.8% |
| 2001 | 4,200 | +2.1% |
| 2011 | 4,251 | +1.2% |
| 2021 | 4,294 | +1.0% |

Source: Censuses

== Economy ==
Bzenec is known for viticulture and wine production. The town also has a tradition of growing fruit and vegetables. Pickled cucumbers and vegetable salads are mainly produced here.

Bzenec is also known for the vinegar production. The vinegar plant was founded here in 1864.

== Transport ==
Bzenec is located on the railway lines Brno–Staré Město and Kyjov–Veselí nad Moravou.

== Sights ==
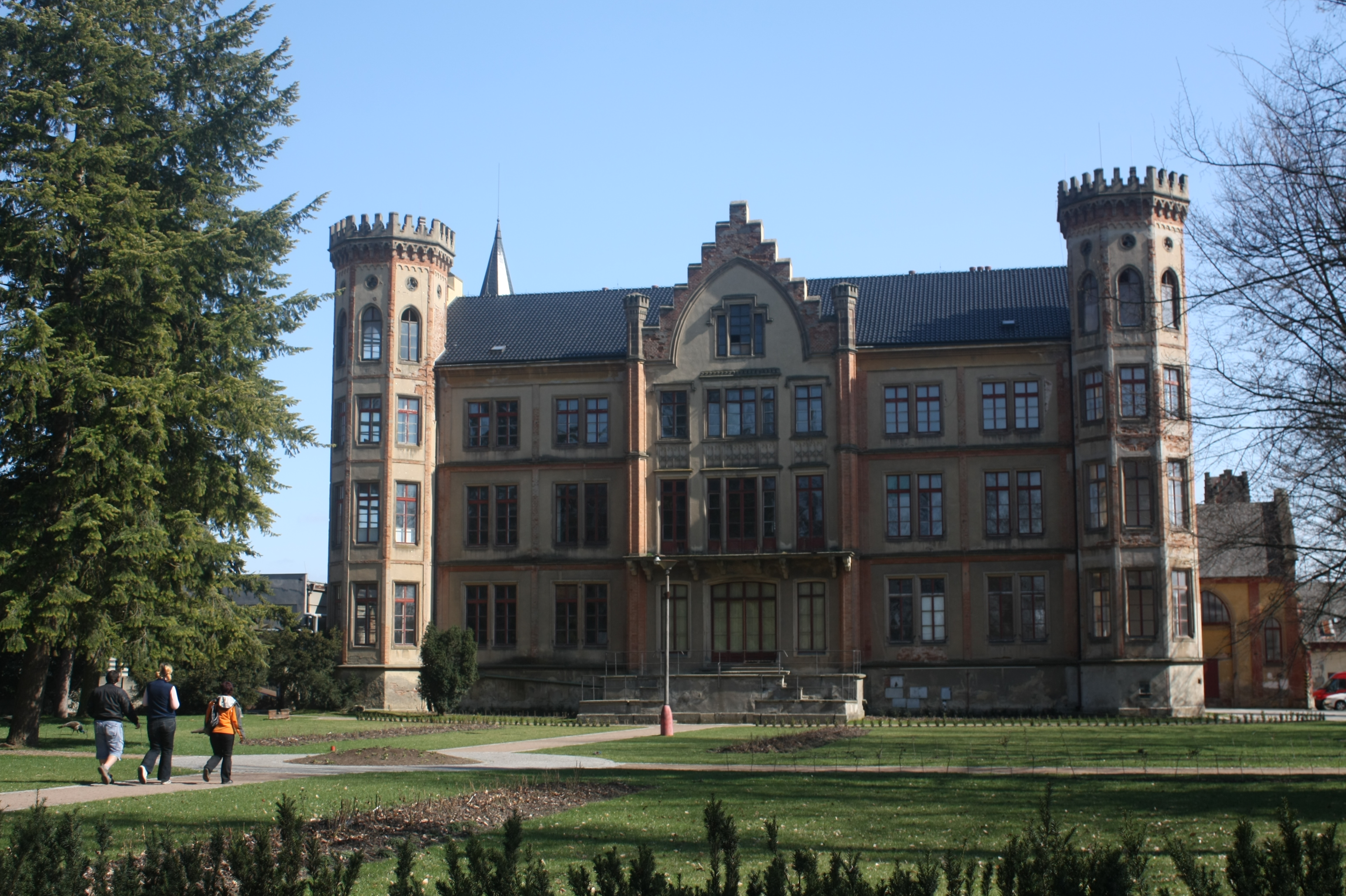
Bzenec Castle

The castle fell into disrepair and today is owned by the town. It is inaccessible. The castle park is open to the public. In the park is a linden tree known as Bzenec Linden, which is supposedly more than 900 years old.

A notable landmark of the town is the Chapel of Saints Florian and Sebastian. It was built in 1703 on the hill above the town, on the site where the old castle stood. Due to its location, the chapel was struck several times by lightning, and then it was destroyed during World War II. The chapel was restored only recently, and was opened in 2018.

== Notable people ==
- Rudolf Auspitz (1837–1906), Austrian industrialist and economist; lived here
- Nehemiah Brüll (1843–1891), rabbi; lived here
- Max Kurzweil (1867–1916), Austrian painter and graphic artist
- Norbert Jokl (1877–1942), Austrian linguist and Albanologist

== Twin towns – sister cities ==
Bzenec is twinned with:

- Egeln, Germany
- Mûrs-Erigné, France
