= Royal Institute of Albanian Studies =

Scientific and cultural institute (1940–1944)

- Formation: 1940
- Dissolved: 1944
- Type: National academy
- Purpose: Science, Linguistics, Arts
- Headquarters: Tirana, Albania
- President: Ernest Koliqi
- Main organ: Presidency of the Academy
- Parent organization: Foundation "Skanderbeg"

The Royal Institute of Albanian Studies (Albanian: Instituti Mbretnuer i Studimeve Shqiptare) (1940–1944) was a scientific and cultural institute that preceded the Academy of Sciences of Albania.

Founded during the Albanian Kingdom (1939–43), it had four commissions:

1. Moral and Historical Sciences
2. Physical Mathematical and Natural Sciences
3. Language and Literature
4. Arts

The head of the Institute was Albanian writer and linguist Ernest Koliqi, whereas its general secretary was Italian priest and historian Giuseppe Valentini. Notable members of the institute included Eqrem Çabej, Aleksandër Xhuvani, Father Anton Harapi, Karl Gurakuqi, Lasgush Poradeci, Namik Resuli, Father Lazër Shantoja, Filip Fishta, Father Justin Rrota, Ilo Mitkë Qafëzezi, Anton Paluca, Xhevat Korça, Kolë Kamsi, Eqrem Vlora, Sotir Kolea, Vangjel Koca, and Dhimitër Beratti.
