= Barič (surname) =

Barič is a surname, and may refer to:

- Nejc Barič (born 1997), Slovenian basketball player
- Nika Barič (born 1992), Slovenian basketball player
- Polona Barič (born 1992), Slovenian handballer

== See also ==
- Baric
- Barić
