= Karl Reinhold =

German physician and albanologist

Karl Reinhold (1834–1880) was a German medical doctor and Albanologist from Kingdom of Hannover. He was born in Göttingen, and worked as the physician-in-chief in the Greek Navy, after Prince Otto of Bavaria became King of the newly constituted Kingdom of Greece. There, he came into contact with the Arvanite sailors, especially from the islands of Poros (Arv. Porjea), Hydra (Arv. Nidhra) and Spetsai (Arv. Petsa). He collected a large corpus of folklore material (tales, folksongs, riddles, translations of the Bible and One Thousand and One Nights from his informant Vasilis Sakellaris (Βασίλης Σακελλάρης), an Arvanite Orthodox priest from Poros. In 1855 he published a small volume of the materials he collected, under the name Noctes Pelasgicae vel Symbolae ad cognoscendos Dialectos Graeciae Pelasgicae collatae cura Dr. Caroli Henrici Theodori Reinhold.

After Reinhold's death, some of his notes fell in the hands of Gustav Meyer, who published them in his Albanesische Studien (1883–1896). His transcriptions and grammatical notes (463 pages) were published in Tirana, Albania (2005). Thanks to Reinhold's efforts, the Hydra/Poros dialect is one of the best-documented dialects of Arvanitika, an endangered language facing extinction.

== Works ==
- Reinhold, Caroli H. Th. (1855): Noctes Pelasgicae vel Symbolae ad cognoscendas dialectos Graeciae Pelasgicas collatae / Cura Dr. Caroli Heinrici Theodori Reinhold ...
- Reinhold, Caroli H. Th. (1865): Ιπποκράτης, 460-377 π.Χ. Ιπποκράτης/Κομιδή.Αθήνησι: Τέλεσί τε και τύποις Κ. Αντωνιάδου.
