= Max Kurzweil =

Austrian painter and printmaker (1867–1916)

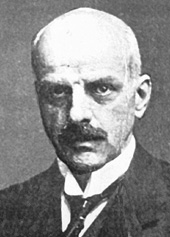

Maximilian Franz Viktor Zdenko Marie Kurzweil (12 October 1867, Bisenz – 9 May 1916, Vienna) was an Austrian painter and printmaker. He moved near Vienna in 1879.

Maximillian or Max Kurzweil studied at the Academy of Fine Arts Vienna with Christian Griepenkerl and Leopold Carl Müller, and attended the Académie Julian in Paris from 1892, where he exhibited his first painting at the Salon in 1894. He was co-founder of the Vienna Secession in 1897, and editor and illustrator of the influential Secessionist magazine Ver Sacrum (Sacred Spring). Kurzweil was also professor at the Frauenkunstschule, an academy for female artists in Vienna. In 1905, he was awarded the Villa Romana prize. His later works show influence from Edvard Munch and Ferdinand Hodler. As a consequence of private circumstances, made worse by his innate sense of melancholy, he committed suicide in 1916 together with his student and lover, Helene Heger. Despite his relatively short career, Kurzweil belongs to the most significant representatives of the Viennese Secessionist movement (along with Gustav Klimt).

== Works ==
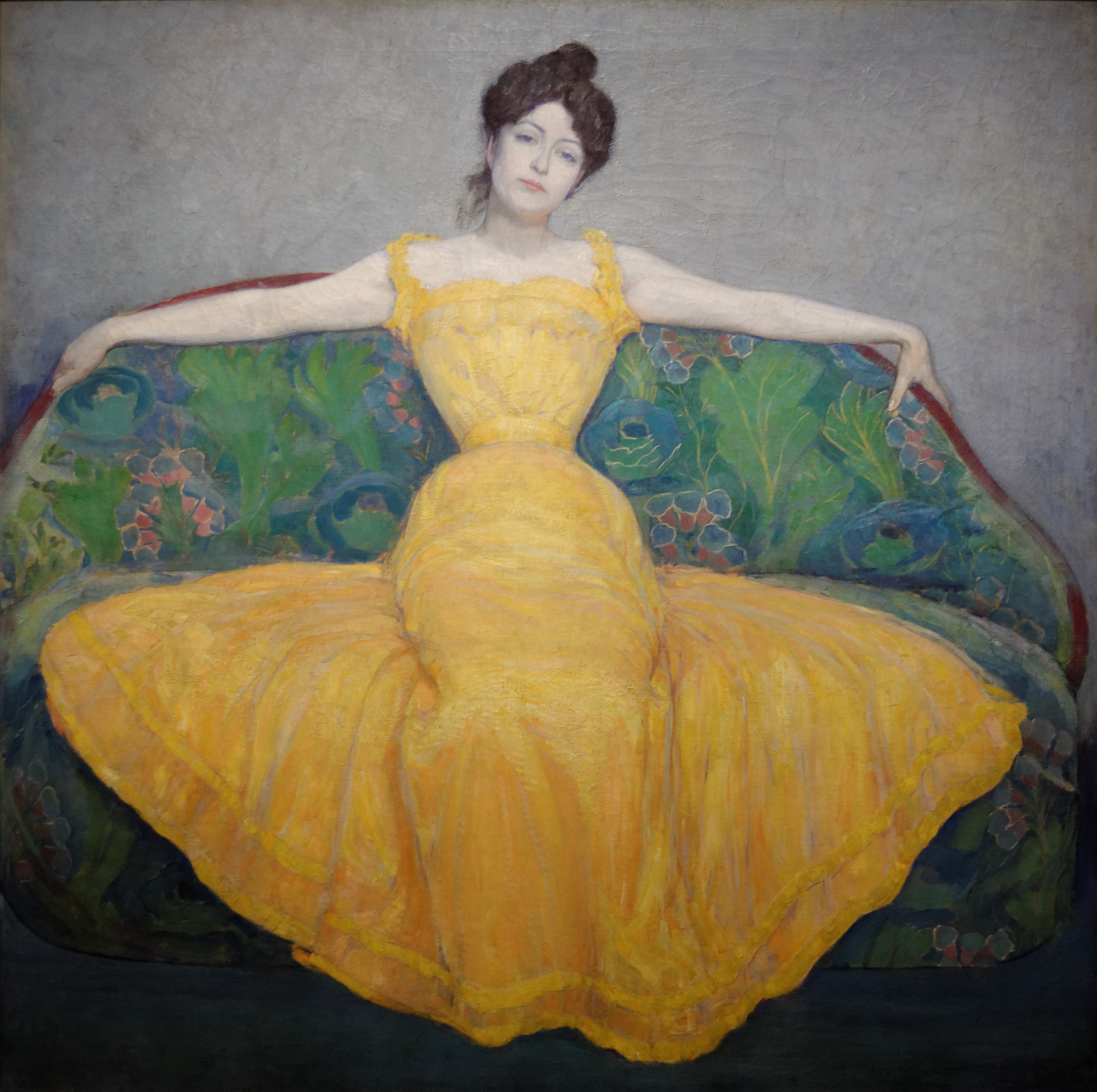
Woman in a Yellow Dress. Oil on canvas, 1899

- "A dear visitor" (Vienna, private), 1894, oil on cardboard, 24.5 x 30.5 cm
- "Woman in a Yellow Dress" (Vienna Museum, Inv. No. 117 376), 1899, oil on canvas
- "The letter II" (San Francisco Fine Arts Museum), 1900, lithograph, 19.5 x 22 cm
- "The cushion" (Art Gallery of New South Wales), 1903, color woodcut, 28.6 x 26 cm
- "Secession XVII. Exhibition" (poster), 1903, color lithograph, 189 x 63.5 cm
- "Portrait of a Lady" (Emilie Floege;? Linz, Castle Museum, gift Kastner), c. 1905, oil on canvas, 100 x 70 cm
- "Mira Bauer" (Vienna, Austrian Gallery), 1908, oil on canvas, 66 x 52.5 cm
- "Bettina Bauer" (Vienna, Austrian Gallery), 1908, oil on canvas, 66 x 52 cm
- "Landscape with Saltlick" (Colorado USA, private), c. 1910, watercolor on paper, 30 x 42.5 cm

== Literature ==
- Adolph Paburg: (imilian) "Kurzweil Max". In: Austrian Biographical Dictionary 1815–1950 (ÖBL). Volume 4, Austrian Academy of Sciences, Vienna 1969, p. 369 f. (Direct Links, "p. 369, p. 370)
- Max Kurzweil 1867 to 1916. Exhibition catalog. Vienna: Austrian Gallery, 1965
- Fritz Novotny / Hubert Adolph: Max Kurzweil. Ein Maler der Wiender Sezession. Vienna: Jugend & Volk, 1969 (in German)
