= Louis Gentil =

French academic

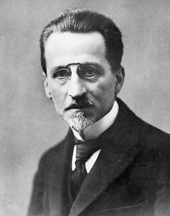
- Born: Algiers, French Algeria

Louis Gentil (July 15, 1868 - June 12, 1925) was a French geologist, explorer, author, and professor. He explored North Africa where he collected rocks and fossils. He discovered Encephalartos laurentianus in 1902. Louis Gentil Field, an abandoned airfield in Morocco, is named for him. The city of Youssoufia in an area where phosphate is mined was known as Louis Gentil. He was a member of the Academy of Sciences.

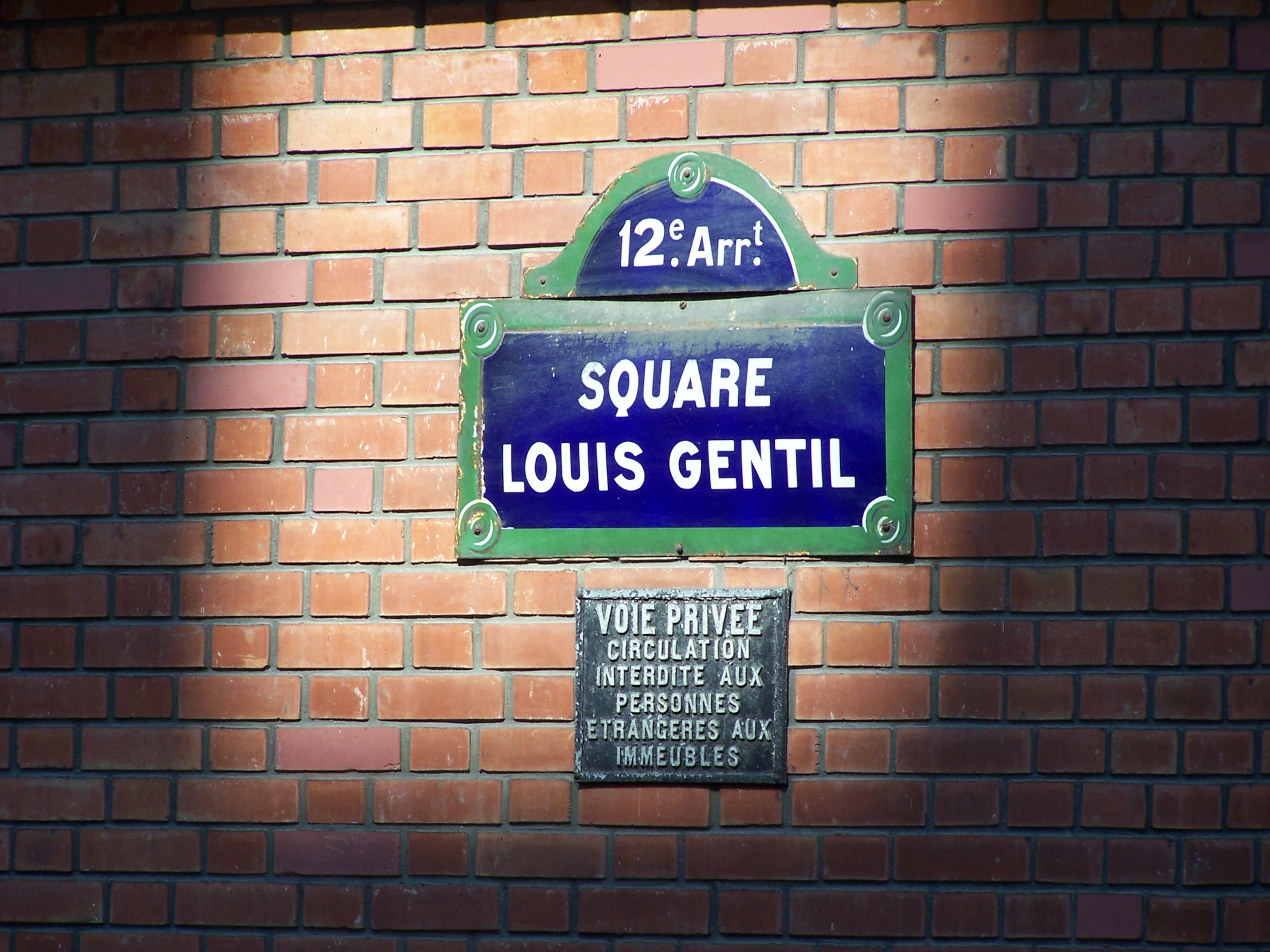
Plaque for Louis Gentil Square in Paris

== Early life ==
He was born in Algiers.

== Exploration ==
He explored the Atlas Mountains and was tasked with exploring the Muluya (Mulucha) valley. He led the Cherifian Institute. He worked with Jacques Bourcart who succeeded him as its director.

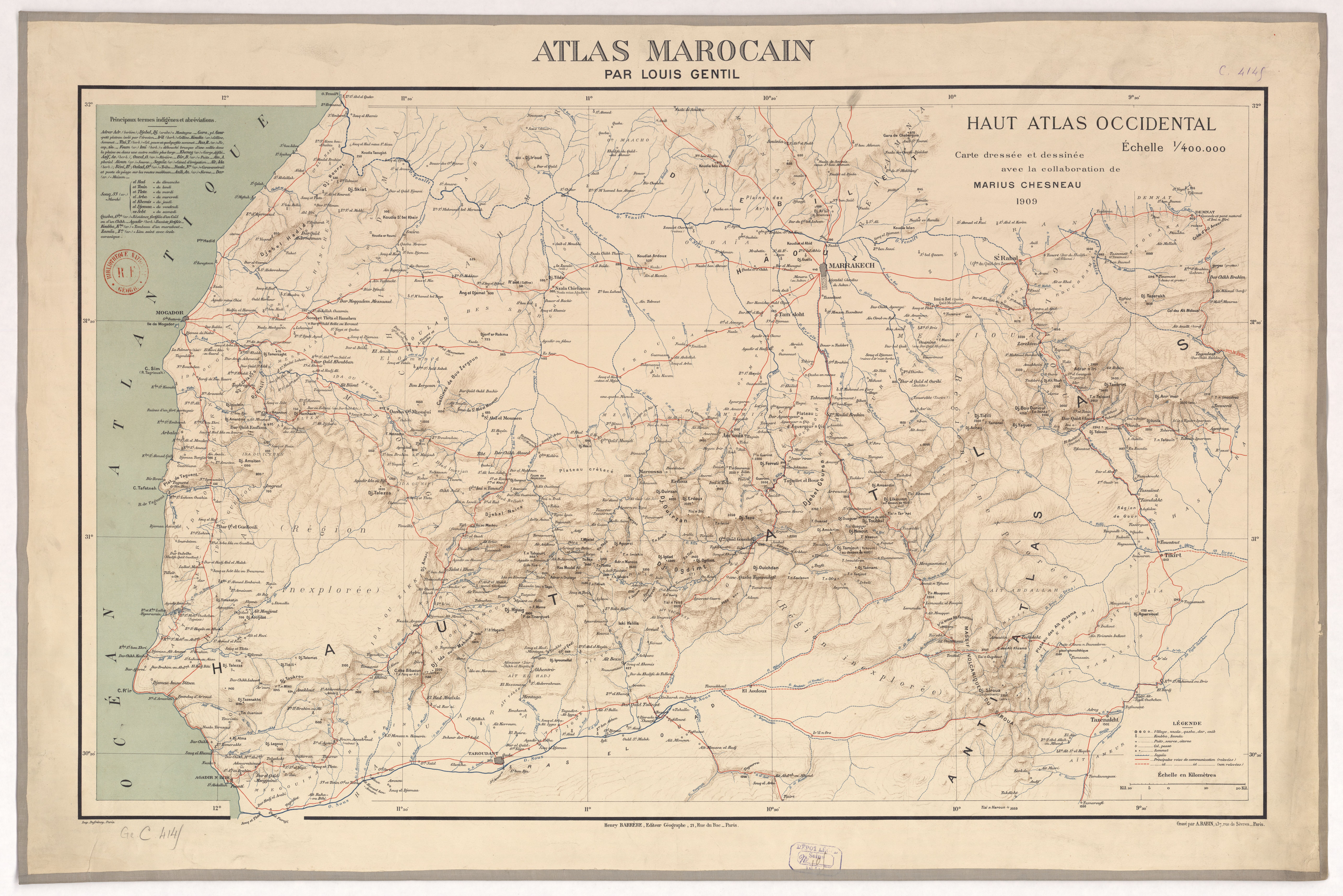
Atlas of Morocco by Gentil

== Publications ==
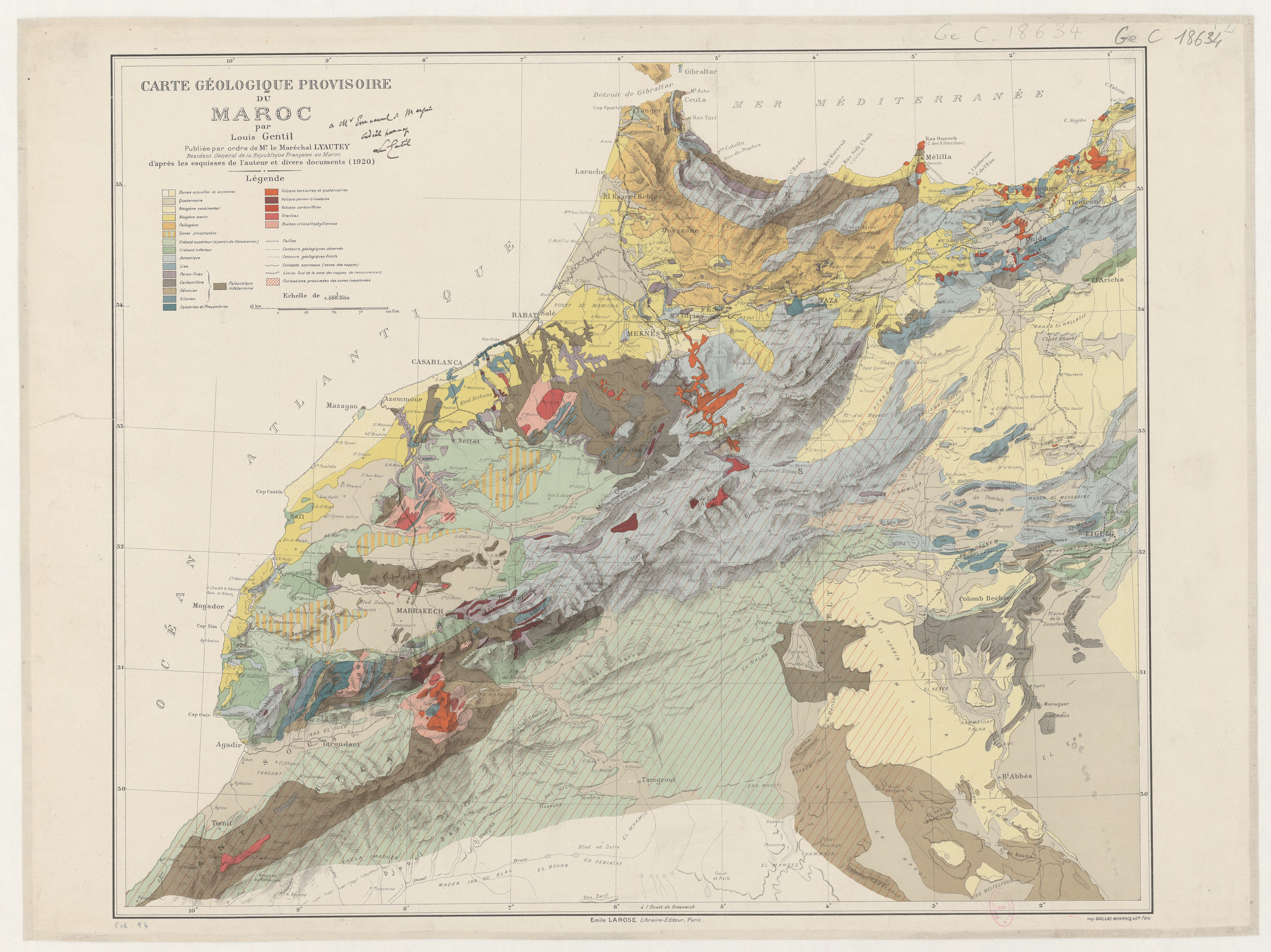
Geological map of Morocco

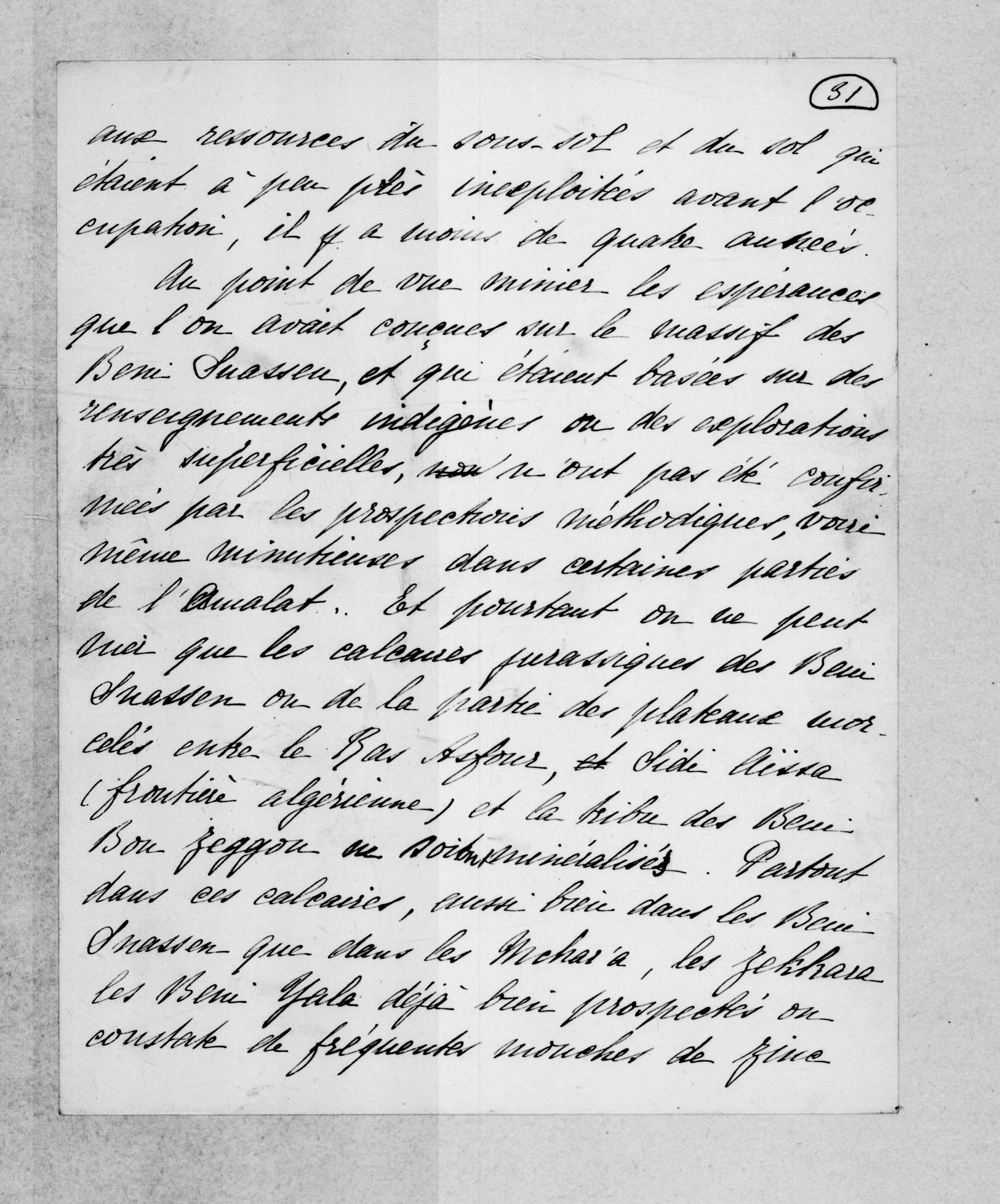

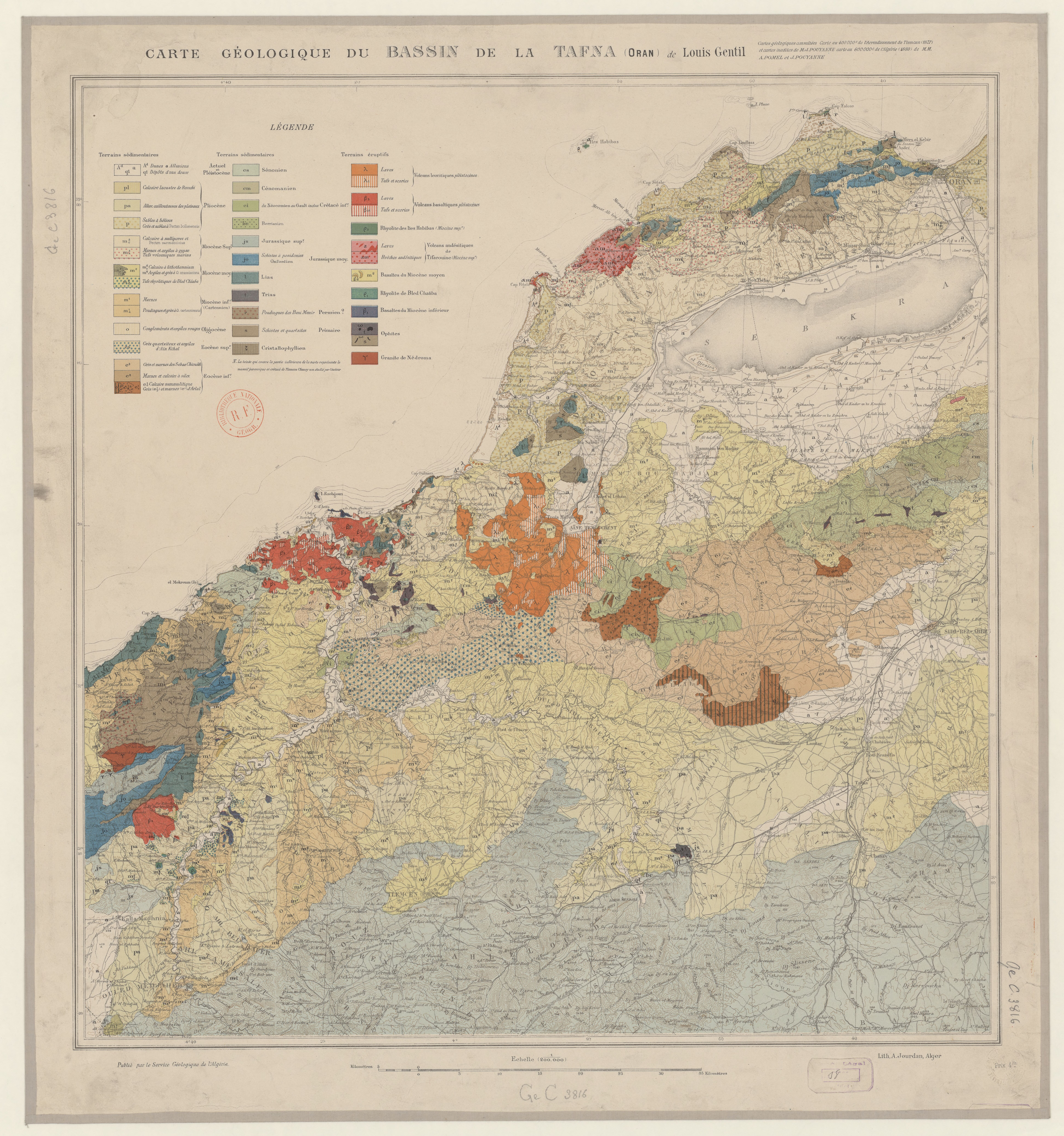
Geologic Map of the Tafna River basin

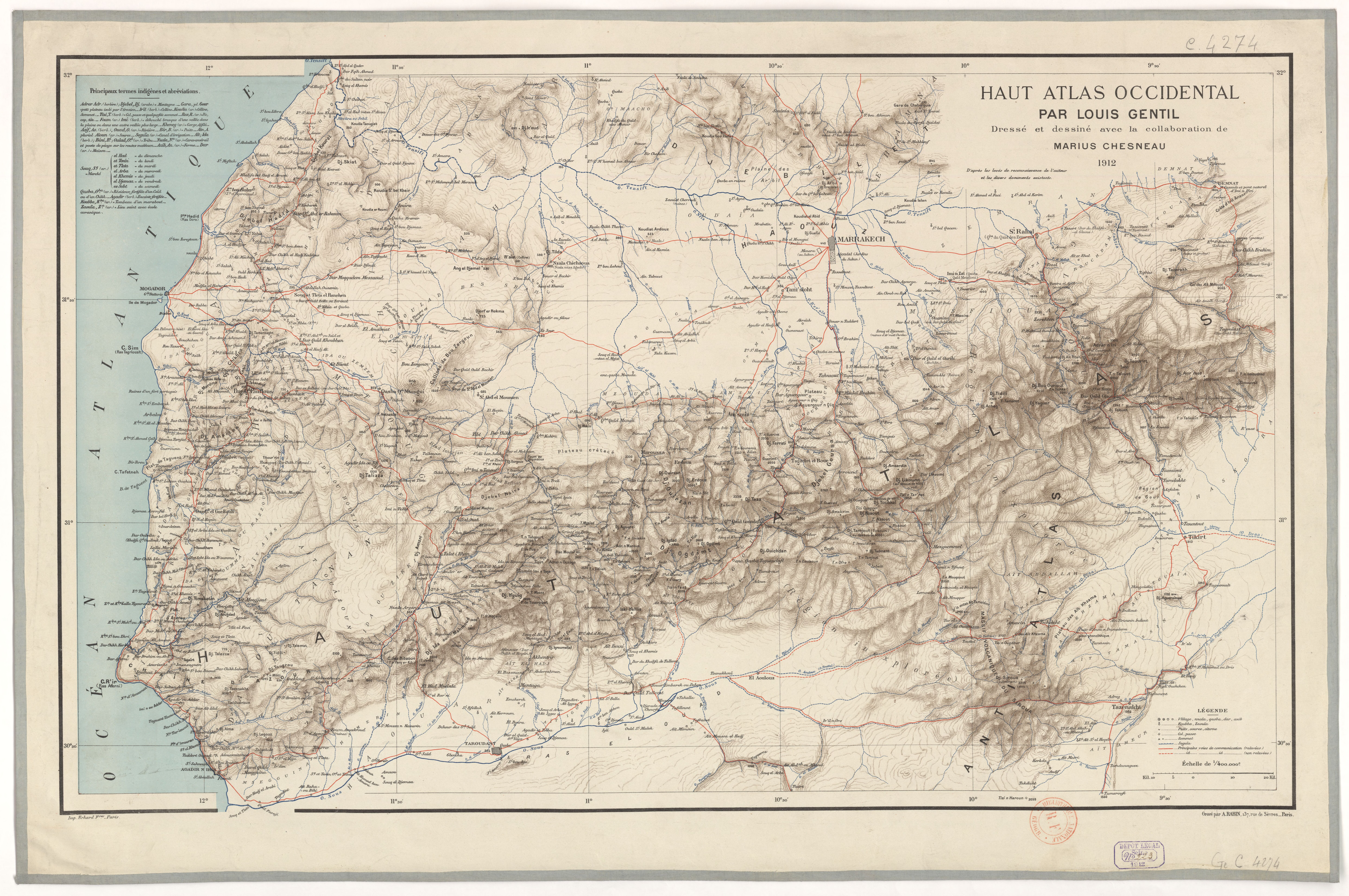
Map of Western Atlas Mountains

- Esquisse stratigraphique et pétrolerique du bassin de la Tafna, Algérie, his doctoral thesis
- Au Coeur de l'Atlas: Mission au Maroc, 1904-1905
- Carte Geologique Provisoire du Maroc, 1920
