= Giuseppe Valentini (albanologist) =

Italian albanologist

Giuseppe Valentini (Albanian: Zef Valentini; July 1900 – 16 November 1979) was an Italian priest and albanologist of the 20th century.

He was born in 1900 in Padova where he studied theology as a Jesuit priest. In 1922 he moved to Albania as a missionary and actively participated in magazines such as Lajmetari i Zemres s'Jezu Krishtit, and Leka, which he directed since 1932. During World War II he became a professor of the Albanian language in the University of Palermo.

Valentini is the author of several important works on Albanian history, law, numismatics, and sacred art.

In 1940 Valentini was one of the founders and general secretary of the Royal Institute of the Albanian Studies, the predecessor institute of the Academy of Sciences of Albania.
