= Eric P. Hamp =

American linguist (1920–2019)

Eric Pratt Hamp
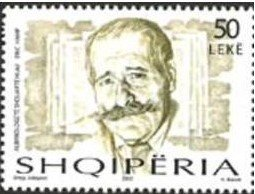
- Hamp on a 2012 stamp of Albania
- Born: November 16, 1920; London, England, U.K.
- Died: February 17, 2019 (aged 98); Traverse City, Michigan, U.S.
- Occupation: Linguist
- Spouse: Margot Faust (m. 1951)
- Children: 2

Eric Pratt Hamp (November 16, 1920 – February 17, 2019) was an American linguist widely respected as a leading authority on Indo-European linguistics, with particular interests in Celtic languages and Albanian. Unlike many Indo-Europeanists, who work entirely on the basis of written materials, he conducted extensive fieldwork on lesser-known Indo-European languages and dialects, such as Albanian, Arbëresh and Arvanitika; Breton; Welsh; Irish; Resian and Scots Gaelic.

His wide-ranging interests also included American Indian languages. He served for many years as editor of the International Journal of American Linguistics and did field work on Quileute and Ojibwa. He also studied linguistic aspects of braille.

Hamp's scholarship was characterized by the densely argued, narrowly focused note, essay and review, generally consisting of a few pages. He wrote more than 3,500 articles and reviews, and nearly every important aspect of historical linguistics was dealt with, often multiple times, in Hamp's writings.

He was the Robert Maynard Hutchins Distinguished Service Professor Emeritus at the University of Chicago and in spite of his advanced age, he continued to write, edit, speak and travel at select meetings and conferences, and was an associate editor of the journal Anthropological Linguistics. He died in February 2019 at the age of 98.

== Early life ==
Hamp was born in London in 1920 and moved to the United States in 1925 when his father became the New York representative of the Silver Line, a British shipping company. Growing up in East Orange, New Jersey, Hamp was sent to the Tome School in 1935 and entered Amherst College in the fall of 1938. He received his BA from Amherst, majoring in Greek and Latin, in 1942.

Hamp was still a British subject during the early years of World War II, and he spent the period immediately after college as a purchasing agent for the Union of South Africa under Lend-Lease, which provided U.S. war materiel to the Allies. He then became a U.S. citizen and served in the U.S. Army, being discharged in 1947 at the rank of sergeant.

Hamp resumed his studies in 1947, entering the Department of Comparative Philology at Harvard University (the department was renamed the Department of Linguistics in 1951), from which he received an MA (1948) and PhD (1954). Among Hamp's teachers at Harvard were Joshua Whatmough and Kenneth H. Jackson.

== Career ==
Hamp became interested in Albanian while in graduate school at Harvard, and he traveled to southern Italy to do field work among the Arbëreshë people, an Albanian ethnolinguistic group in southern Italy. It was in Italy in 1950 that he received an invitation to join the faculty of the University of Chicago as a lecturer in Linguistics.

Hamp spent his entire academic career on the University of Chicago faculty, being promoted to assistant professor in 1953, associate professor in 1958 and full professor in 1962. He retired from teaching in 1991. At Chicago, he was the Robert Maynard Hutchins Distinguished Service Professor Emeritus in the Department of Linguistics, where he served as chair from 1966 to 1969.

Hamp also held appointments at the University of Chicago in the departments of Psychology and Slavic Languages and Literatures, as well as in the Committee on the Ancient Mediterranean World. He served as director for the Center for Balkan and Slavic Studies from 1965 to 1991.

He was a visiting fellow and faculty member at a number of institutions throughout the world, including the University of Michigan; the University of Wisconsin; the Dublin Institute for Advanced Studies; the University of Edinburgh; and the Luigj Gurakuqi University of Shkodër, Albania. In 1960, he held the Hermann and Klara H. Collitz Professorship for Comparative Philology at the Linguistic Society of America Summer Institute at the University of Texas.

Hamp also served as a guest lecturer, giving the Rudolf Thurneysen Memorial Lecture at the University of Bonn and the James W. Poultney Lecture at Johns Hopkins University.

== Selected honors ==
Hamp's extensive career brought him recognition from multiple disciplines in language studies, including six Festschriften: one in general linguistics, two in Balkan studies, one in Native American languages, one in Indo-European linguistics and one in Celtic studies. These works include Studies in Balkan Linguistics to Honor Eric P. Hamp on his Sixtieth Birthday, Folia Slavica 4, 2–3, published in 1981 and edited by Howard I. Aronson and Bill J. Darden; Celtic Language, Celtic Culture: A Festschrift for Eric P. Hamp, published in 1990 and edited by A.T. E. Matonis and Daniel F. Melia; and Scritti in onore di Eric Pratt Hamp per il suo 90. compleanno, edited by Giovanni Belluscio and Antonio Mendicino of the University of Calabria and published in 2010 (ISBN 9 788874 581016).

In 1971, Hamp served as president of the Linguistic Society of America.

Hamp was a member of many academies and learned societies, including the American Academy of Arts and Sciences, the American Philosophical Society, the Royal Danish Academy of Sciences and Letters and the Albanian Academy of Sciences, and he received honorary doctorates from Amherst College, University of Wales, the University of Calabria, the University of Delhi, and the University of Edinburgh.

On his 92nd birthday in 2012, Posta Shqiptare, the national postal service of Albania, honored Hamp with a 50 lekë stamp in a series commemorating foreign Albanologists, linguists who have studied the Albanian language. Hamp was the only living Albanologist honored in the series, the two other commemorated linguists being Norbert Jokl and Holger Pedersen.

== Personal life ==
Hamp married Margot Faust, a lecturer in Art Education at the University of Chicago, in 1951. She often assisted him in his field work. They had two children: a daughter, Julijana, and a son, Alex. They remained married for more than 67 years until Hamp's death in 2019.

== Selected works ==
- Author: A Glossary of American Technical Linguistic Usage, 3d rev. ed., 1966, Vaccarizzo Albanese Phonology, 1993
- (with others) Language and Machines, 1966
- Co-editor Readings in Linguistics I & II, abridged ed., 1995, Languages and Areas: Studies presented to George V. Bobrinskoy, 1967, Themes in Linguistics: The 1970s, 1973
- Advisory editor: Foundations of Language 1964–74, Studies in Language, 1974–79, General Linguistics, 1966–91, Papers in Language and Lit., 1965–92, Journal Linguistics, 1971–81, Journal Indo-European Studies, 1972—, Folia Linguistica Historica, 1978–98, Ann. of Armenian Linguistics, 1978—, Anthropological Linguistics, 1981—, Études Celtiques, 1982—, Journal Historical Linguistics and Philology, 1982–90, Glossologia (Athens), 1983–99, Jewish Language Rev. (Haifa), 1983, Medieval Language Rev., 1991—, Linguistics Abstracts, 1985, 95, Voprosy Jazykoznanija (Moscow), 1988–92, Studia Indogermanica, 1990—, Albanica, 1991–93
- Associate editor: International Journal of American Linguistics, 1967–92, emeritus editor, 1992—, Native American Texts Series, 1974—, founding editor
- Atlas Linguarum Europae, 1984—
- Section head comparative and hist. linguistics: Celtic and Albanian sections Modern Language Association Ann. Bibliography, 1969–82
- Advisor: Encyclopedia Brit., 1969–2000, member advisory committee, 1985–2000
- Member adv. board and contributor Pergamon-Aberdeen Encyclopedia of Language and Linguistics, 1988–94
- Member Advisory Board Slavia Centralis, 2009—
- Adv. and project linguist Braille Reading and Language Programs and Braille Research Center, Am. Printing House for the Blind, 1977–96, member International English Braille Linguistics committee, 1994—
- Editor for etymologies: Random House Unabridged Dictionary (rev. ed.)
- Participant in Yeniseic-Tlingit-Athabaskan Familial Proof, Tokyo, Leipzig and Alaska 2004,-06, 08, 10
- Author ca. 1,500 articles in field.

== Bibliography ==
Among the more than 3500 articles, reviews and other works Eric Hamp produced, some notable ones are:

- Hamp, Eric P., Martin Joos, Fred W. Householder, and Robert Austerlitz, editors Readings in Linguistics I & II. With a new Preface by Eric Hamp. Abridged edition. 302 p. 8½ × 11 1957, 1966, 1995
- Hamp, Eric P. "Mabinogi." Transactions of the Honourable Society of the Cymmrodorion . 1974–75. 243-49.
- Hamp, Eric. 1979. "Toward the history of Slavic scholarship," Slovene Studies 1/2: 61–62.
- Hamp, Eric. 1988. "Indo-European o-grade deverbal thematics in Slovene," Slovene Studies 10/1: 65–70
- Hamp, Eric. 1989. "On the survival of Slovene o-grade deverbal thematics in Resian," Slovene Studies 10/2: 171–173.
- Hamp, Eric. 1989. "Chronological marriage patterns in Resia," Slovene Studies 10/2: 201–202.
- Hamp, Eric. 1996. "On the Indo-European origins of the retroflexes in Sanskrit." The Journal of the American Oriental Society, October 21, 1996: 719–724.
- Hamp, Eric. 1999. "Mabinogi and Archaism" Celtica 23, 1999: 96–110.
- Hamp, Eric. 2007. Studime krahasuese për shqipen (Comparative studies on Albanian) edited by Rexhep Ismajli, Akademia e Shkencave dhe e Arteve e Kosovës, Prishtinë.
