= Oda Buchholz =

German linguist

Oda Buchholz (21 January 1940 – 2 January 2014) was a German linguist known for her expertise in the Albanian language. She made contributions to Albanian studies and Balkan linguistics.

== Biography ==
Born on 21 January 1940 in Dessau, Germany, she began her higher education at the Faculty of History and Philology at the State University of Tirana from 1959 to 1961. She was one of the first German students to study in an Albanian-speaking environment, focusing on Albanian language and literature. Due to strained political relations between Albania and the German Democratic Republic, she could not continue her studies in Tirana. Instead, she completed her state examination at Humboldt University in Berlin in 1964, majoring in Albanology with minors in Bulgarian language and literature.

At the Berlin Academy of Sciences, Buchholz joined a dedicated group of young scholars. She collaborated with noted linguists like M. Bierwisch and worked in a research team led by W. Fiedler. Her dissertation, titled "Doubling of Objects in Albanian" (Zur Verdoppelung der Objekte im Albanischen), was completed in 1969 and published in 1977, pioneering the generative perspective on Albanian syntax.

From 1979 to 1989, Oda Buchholz taught at Humboldt University, where she developed courses such as "Albanian Syntax," "Language Practice in Albanian," and "Translation (Albanian-German, German-Albanian)." After 1990, she continued teaching and researching in Albanology and Balkanology at Freie Universität Berlin.

Buchholz collaborated with Wilfried Fiedler to write "Albanische Grammatik" (1987), a key work in the field of Albanian grammar. She also compiled Albanian-German and German-Albanian dictionaries together with Fiedler and G. Uhlisch, essential resources for scholars and translators. Her translations of Albanian literature into German include significant works such as Ismail Kadare's "The General of the Dead Army" (1977, 1988), an anthology of Kosovar poetry (1979, 1988), and Dritëro Agolli's "The Rise and Fall of Comrade Zylo" (1993).

Oda Buchholz died on 2 January 2014, in Berlin, just a few weeks before her 74th birthday. Her work and dedication to the Albanian language and culture have left a profound and lasting impact on the field of Albanian studies.
