= Wilfried Fiedler =

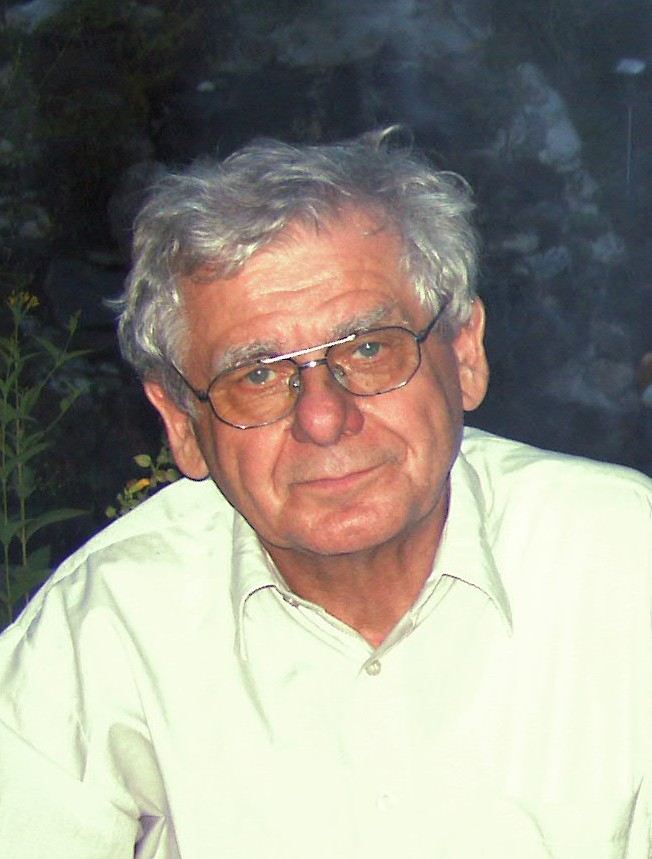
Wilfried Fiedler

Wilfried Fiedler (7 May 1933 – 11 September 2019) was a German albanologist, balkanologist, and linguist, known for his significant contributions to the studies of the Albanian language and Balkanology.

== Biography ==
Born in Limbach-Oberfrohna, Saxony, he studied Slavic studies and other philologies at Humboldt University in Berlin (1951–1955). After completing his studies, he worked as a scientific assistant at the Institute of Folk Culture of the Academy of Sciences of the German Democratic Republic (GDR) (1955–1963).

Fiedler first visited Albania in 1957, where he stayed for four months as part of a joint Albanian-German expedition to collect folk songs, resulting in the publication of the volume "Këngë çame" (1965). In 1959, he returned to Albania to gather materials for his dissertation "Research on the Formation of the Plural in the Albanian Language" (1961), and from that year, he began teaching Albanian language, literature, and folklore at Humboldt University in Berlin.

From 1963 to 1968, Fiedler worked at the Linguistics Commission and the Institute for Romance Languages and Culture at the Academy of Sciences of Germany in Berlin. From 1968 to 1988, he led the research group for Balkan studies at the Central Institute of Linguistics of the Academy of Sciences of the GDR. In 1988, he defended his habilitation thesis in Albanology at Humboldt University.

After 1989, Fiedler worked as a professor of Albanology at LMU Munich until 1998, and also lectured at the University of Vienna. From 1999 to 2018, he continued to deliver lectures on Albanology at the University of Jena. In 1991, he was elected as an external member of the Academy of Sciences and Arts of Kosovo, and in 2006, as an external member of the Academy of Sciences of Albania.

Fiedler's major works include "Albanische Grammatik" (1988), co-authored with Oda Buchholz, "Das albanische Verbalsystem in der Sprache des Gjon Buzuku" (2004), a detailed study of the verb system of 16th-century Albanian, and "Formimi i shumësit të gjuhës shqipe" (2010). He also translated several important works of Albanian literature into German, including Ismail Kadare's "The General of the Dead Army" and poems by Martin Camaj and Ali Podrimja.

Wilfried Fiedler is recognized as one of the most important albanologists in the German-speaking world, with contribution to the study and promotion of the Albanian language and culture.

== Publications ==
- Albanische Volksmusik. Bd. 1. Gesänge der Çamen. Berlin 1965 (with Doris and Erich Stockmann).
- Wörterbuch Albanisch-Deutsch. Leipzig 1977 (with Oda Buchholz and Gerda Uhlisch); Auflagen nach 1990: Leipzig/Berlin/München/Wien/Zürich/New York, ISBN 3-324-00250-8.
- Albanische Grammatik. Leipzig 1987, ISBN 3-324-00025-4 (with Oda Buchholz).
- Wörterbuch Deutsch-Albanisch. Leipzig/Berlin/München/Wien/Zürich/New York 1997, ISBN 3-324-00251-6 (with Ardian Klosi).
- Das albanische Verbalsystem in der Sprache des Gjon Buzuku (1555). Pristina 2004, ISBN 9951-413-15-3.
- Die Pluralbildung im Albanischen. Pristina 2007, ISBN 978-9951-413-62-6.
- Vergleichende Grammatik der Balkansprachen (Morphosyntaktisch-typologischer Vergleich des Albanischen mit den anderen Balkansprachen). Pristina 2018, ISBN 978-9951-615-88-4.
