= Tahir Dizdari =

Albanian journalist

- Born: 15 November 1900; Shkodër, Ottoman Empire
- Died: 9 May 1972 (aged 71); Tirana, Albania
- Awards: First Class "Naim Frashëri" Order, 1995

Academic work
- Notable works: Fjalor i orientalizmave në gjuhën shqipe (Dictionary of Orientalisms in Albanian), 2005

Tahir Nasuf Dizdari (15 November 1900 – 9 May 1972) was an Albanian orientalist, folklorist, and scholar. He was the main orientalist in Albania, and contributed in identifying and studying oriental words borrowed from Albanian.

== Life ==
Dizdari the son of Nasuf Dizdari (1858–1940), a local folklorist and translator, and was born on 15 November 1900, in Shkodër, today's Albania, back then still part of the Ottoman Empire. Dizdari family traces their origin from a military who had settled in Shkodër from İznik of the Province of Bursa, today's Turkey. Dizdari finished his early education in the Albanian language school of his town, following later the Ruzdiye (middle school) which he couldn't finish due to the outbreak of the First Balkan War. He registered later in the Saverian College of Shkodër, finishing it in 1918. He focused on the Oriental languages and on mastering French. At a young age, he started working in the Albanian public administration, holding various positions in Vlorë, Durrës, and Pukë. One of his contributions during this time was the draft-statute Ligja e katundarive dhe e komunave (Law of villages and municipalities), being a main contributor of a work that targeted the formation, structuration, and operation of the local government, first of its kind within the newly created Albanian state of that time. In 1935, he published the manual Udhëhjekës për konferenca (Guide to conferences). He was also involved in huge projects, i.e. the general registration of the population in 1930.

As a monarchist and supporter of King Zog I of Albania, Dizdari participated in the armed resistance against the Italian invasion of Albania of April 1939. Due to his known pro-monarchy stance and his involvement in the skirmishes against the Italians at Gomsiqe near Pukë, he was arrested and interned by the Italians.

With the German occupation of Albania, he resumed his research on orientalism and writing in the local Albanian press. During 1944, he wrote the separate column "Pyes vetveten" (I Ask Myself) in the newspaper Bashkimi i kombit (Nation's Unity), which would continue later in the Bashkimi (Unity) from 1945 to 1946, using the pen-name Hijekakeqi. During 1944, still in the newspaper Bashkimi i kombit, he contributed to the linguistics section "Fjalë iranishte në gjuhën shqipe" (Iranian Words in Albanian) using the pen-name Bishtiqindija. He also published two toponymy studies: Kraja in the Bashkimi i kombit and Katër Balët (Four Balas) in the magazine Bota e re (New World). He wrote also satirical articles, and religion-oriented articles in the magazines Kultura islame (Islamic Culture) and Bleta (Honeybee).

In May 1945 he was affiliated with the newspaper Bashkimi of the Democratic Front, and in October 1945 acquired membership in the Albanian League of Writers and Artists. From 1946 to 1951, he focused on studying the Albanian dictionary and folklore, submitting a work of around 800 pages to the Institute of Folklore.

In February 1951, he was arrested and interrogated for several months due to an alleged connection with the so-called bombing of the Soviet embassy in Tirana, but was set free since there was no incriminating evidence against him. Nevertheless, this affected his position within the Communist society, and his relations with the scholar environment. This also marked probably the most critical moment in his life, his family would be expelled from Tirana. In 1952, he opened a small bookstore which served him for lodging as well. Due to his knowledge of Oriental languages, parts of the "Oriental words dictionary" (which would be his most notable work later) were published in the Buletinin USHT (seria shkencave shoqërore) (Bulletin of the University of Tirana: social sciences series) of early 60s, and later the Studime filologjike (Philological studies) from 1964 to 1966. He also took part and gave speeches in three conferences on albanology, held in Tirana in 1962, 1968, and 1969. The Institute of Linguistics (Albanian: Instituti i Gjuhësisë), despite the previous political obstacles, decided to engage him as "senior scientific cooperator" (Albanian: Bashkëpunëtor i vjetër shkencor), affiliated with its lexicology section, from 1965 until 9 May 1972, when Dizdari died.

His main works during his active period from 1941 to 1971 are the Orientalizmat në gjuhën shqipe (Orientalisms in Albanian), and Fjalë të pambledhura nga fjalorët e deritanishëm (Words Not Collected in Previous Dictionaries), the last one being an important work on improving Albanian dictionaries with old or obsolete words not collected until then. Both were handed over to the Institute of Linguistics and were published later.

The Fjalor i orientalizmave në gjuhën shqipe (Dictionary of Orientalisms in Albanian), a voluminous work of around 1200 pages, was published in 2005.

== Awards ==
Base on a proposal by the Academy of Sciences, the President of Albania Sali Berisha awarded him the order "Naim Frashëri" of 1-st Class in 1995, with the dedication "For valuable contribution in the development of Albanological studies".

== Notes and references ==
Notes

- a: Elsie places date of death on 6 May 1972
