= Georg Renatus Solta =

Austrian linguist (1915–2005)

Georg Renatus Solta (18 April 1915 in Vienna – 2 May 2005) was an Austrian Indo-Europeanist who specialized in Balkan linguistics.

== Works ==
- 1960, Die Stellung des Armenischen im Kreise der Indogermanischen Sprachen, Vienna
- 1965, Palatalisierung und Labialisierung, IF 70, 276–315.
- 1974, Zur Stellung der lateinischen Sprache, ISBN 3-7001-0042-6.
- 1980, Einführung in die Balkanlinguistik mit besonderer Berücksichtigung des Substrats und des Balkanlateinischen, ISBN 3-534-07625-7.
- 1997, with G. Deeters and V. Inglisian, Armenisch Und Kaukasische Sprachen, ISBN 90-04-00862-4.

== See also ==
- Balkanization
- Paleo-Balkan languages
- Norbert Jokl
