= Mitrush Kuteli =

Albanian writer, translator, and economist

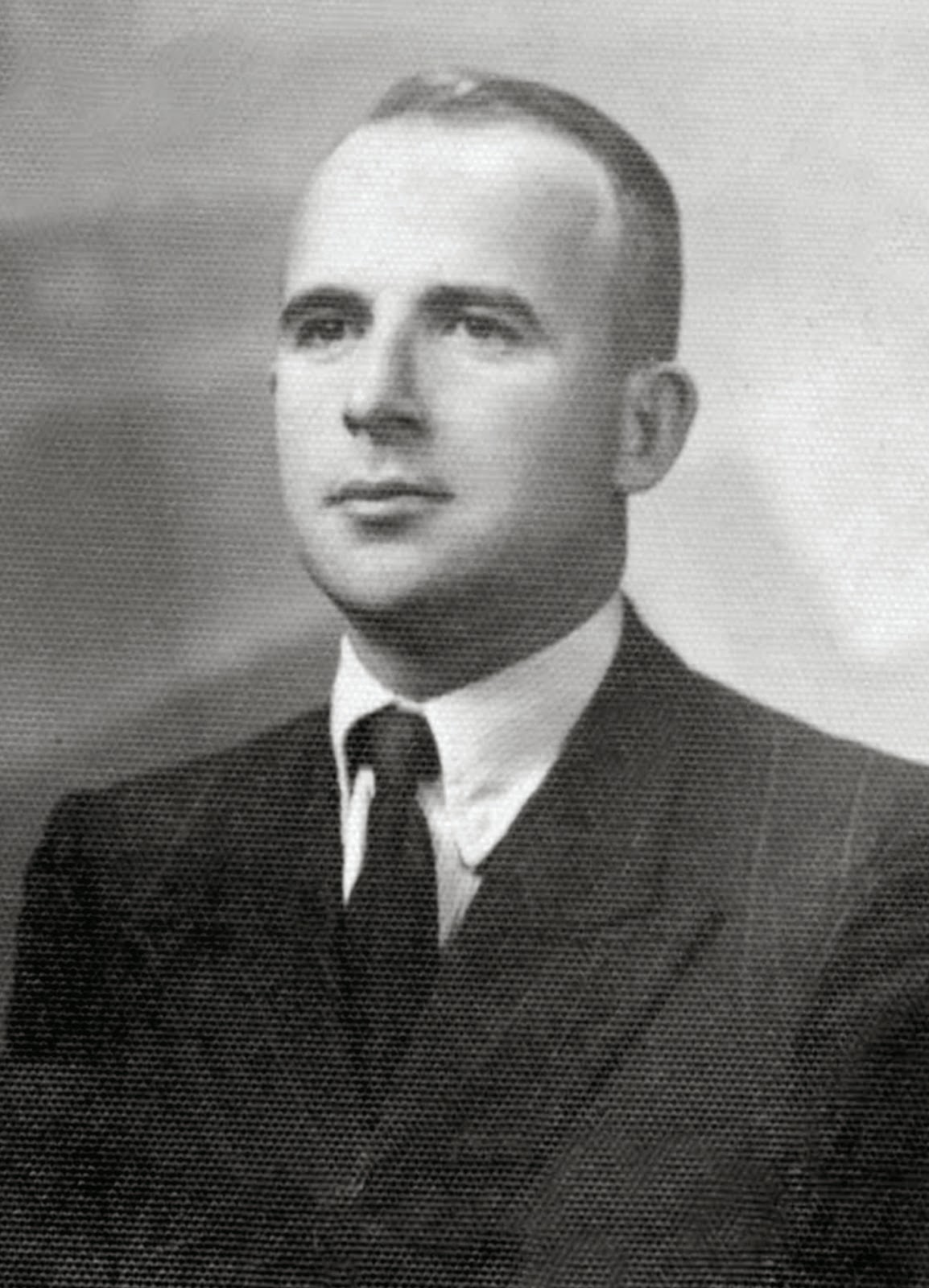
- Kuteli in 1930
- Born: 13 September 1907; Pogradec, Manastir Vilayet, Ottoman Empire (modern Albania)
- Died: 4 May 1967 (aged 59); Tirana, PR Albania
- Occupations: Economist, translator
- Spouse: Efterpi Pasko née Skendi
- Writing career
- Pen name: Mitrush Kuteli, Janus, Dr. Pas, Izedin Jashar Kutrulija
- Period: 1933-1967
- Genres: Novels, Translations
- Notable works: Netë shqiptare (Albanian Nights), Ago Jakupi, Kapllan Aga of Shaban Shpata (Kapllan Aga i Shaban Shpatës), The Love of Artan the Barbarian (Dashuria e Barbarit Artan), Old Albanian Tales (Tregime të Moçme Shqiptare), Attack and Tears (Sulm e Lotë), and Songs and Cries from the Burned City (Këngë e Britma nga Qyteti i Djegur),

Dhimitër Pasko (Romanian: Dimitrie Pascu; 13 September 1907 – 4 May 1967) was a well-known Albanian writer, literary critic and translator. Along with Ernest Koliqi he is considered as the founder of modern Albanian prose; in Albanian literature his pen name for which he gained fame was Mitrush Kuteli.

== Biography ==
Mitrush Kuteli was born Dhimitër Pasko in the town of Pogradec at the shores of Lake of Ohrid, son of Pandeli and Polikseni. His mother was an ethnic Albanian while his father was an ethnic Aromanian. Kuteli studied at a Romanian commercial college in Thessaloniki, later moving to Bucharest where, in 1931, he graduated in economics with a dissertation on the banking system in the Balkans. And in 1934 he earned a doctorate on the field, evaluated with "Diplomam Magnam cum Laudæ".

While in Bucharest he became a journalist and directed the Albanian-language weekly newspaper Shqipëri' e re (New Albania), published in Constanța, from 1928 until 1933. In 1937 he organized the publishing Lasgush Poradeci's collection of verse, Ylli i zemrës (The Star of the heart).

From 1934 he was a high official of the Romanian Ministry of Economy and later on he was the director of the Cernăuți bank.

He returned to Albania in 1942, and during World War II wrote and self-published most of his major works. At the end of the war he founded the short-lived literary periodical, Revista letrare (Literary Review), with Nexhat Hakiu, Vedat Kokona and Sterjo Spasse, joined the editorial board of Bota e re (New World), the first Albanian post-war literary journal, and became a founding member of the Albanian League of Writers and Artists.

=== Imprisonment and release ===
The Albanian Communist Party took power after World War II, but by 1947 was in the control of Yugoslavia. Pasko, an official Albanian delegate to Yugoslavia, disapproved of a proposed currency and customs union agreed between the two countries, and of a Serbian re-occupation of Kosovo; an earlier 1944 Pasko poem, "Poem kosovar" (Kosovar poem), asserted his criticism of Serbian actions. Upon the Albanian delegation's return from Yugoslavia, Pasko was sentenced to 15 years imprisonment for his criticism, during which he attempted suicide. Following the freeing of Yugoslavia's hold over Albanian party politics, Pasko was released.

After his release from prison, he was informed by the authorities that his family would be banished to Kavajë. His personal documents were branded with the stamp "Enemy of the people", but his family were saved after the intervention of Fadil Paçrami. Kuteli was given new documents and a job. Pasko died of a heart attack in 1967.

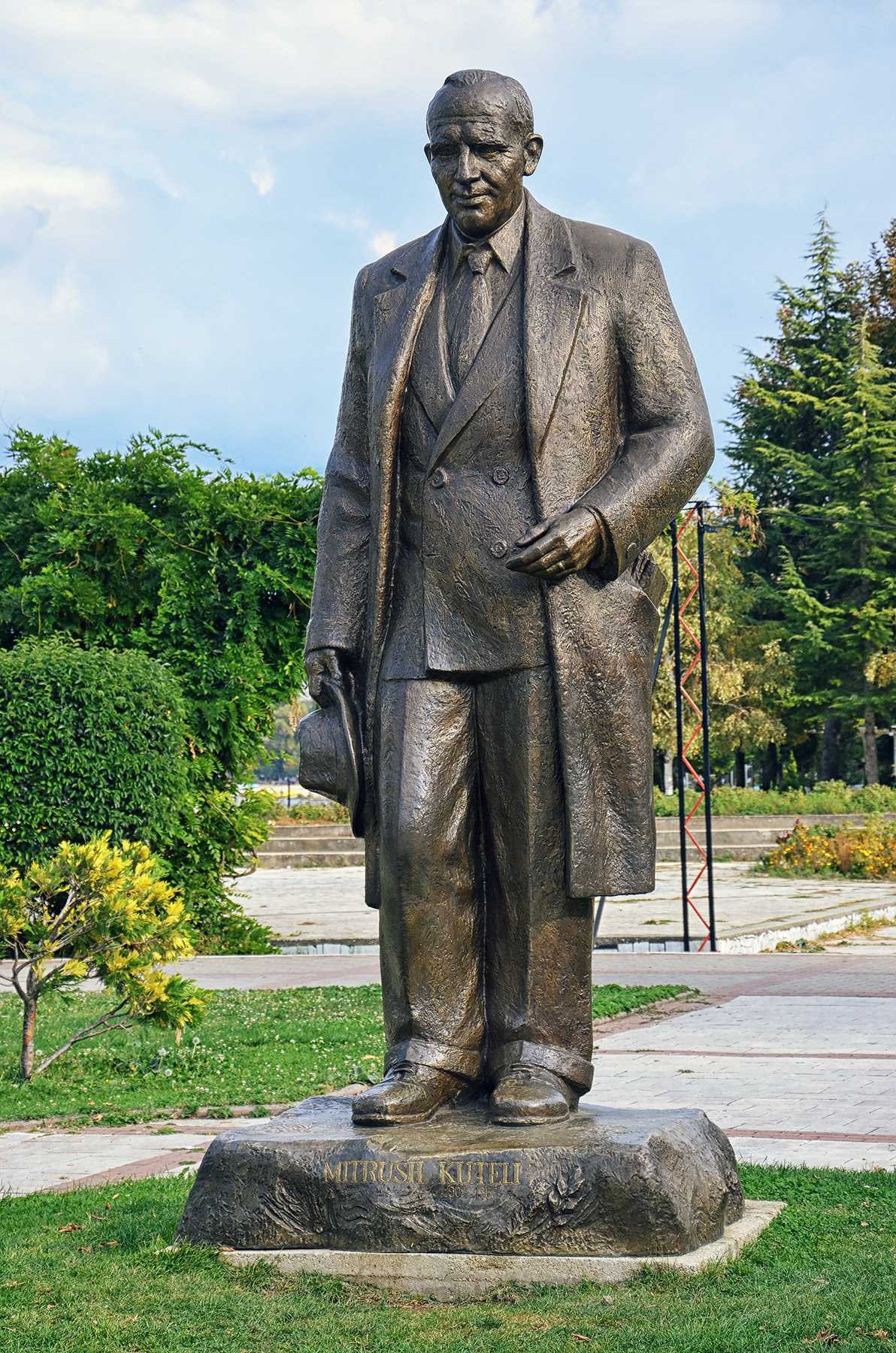
Statue dedicated to Mitrush Kuteli in his hometown Pogradec

== Literary works ==
=== Economy ===
He was the representative of the democratic and bourgeois alternative for the economic development during the reign of King Zog I.

=== Literature ===
He published his first authored book, Netë shqipëtare (Albanian nights) in 1938, a compilation of eight tales of village life from his native Pogradec. This edition was largely destroyed by a fire, and only became widely read through a second edition published in 1944. He worked as a translator for Naim Frashëri Publishing House, the state-owned Tirana publishing company.

Pasko, as with other Albanian writers of the time, accommodated the imposed cultural doctrine of Zhdanovism by translating Soviet-approved Russian authors, although he found himself able to translate his favorite Russian, Romanian, and Spanish writers, publish tales and verse for children, and adapt Albanian oral verse to prose.

=== Criticism ===
It is asserted that he followed Poradeci's tread, although his poetry is even more Romanian in character.

== Selected bibliography ==
- Lasgush Poradeci - 1937
- Net shqiptare (Albanian nights) - 1938
- Pylli i gështenjave (The Chestnut forest) - 1958
- Ago Jakupi e të tjera rrëfime (Ago Jakupi and other stories) - 1943
- Sulm e lotë (Attack and tears) - 1943
- Shënime letrare (Literary Notes) - 1944
- Havadan më havadan (From peak to peak) - 1944
- Kapllan aga i Shaban Shpatës (Kapllan agha of Shaban Shpata) - 1944
- Dashuria e barbarit Artan (The love of Artan the Barbarian) - 1946
- Xinxifilua (Gingerman) - 1962
- Tregime të moçme shqiptare (Old Albanian tales) - 1965
- Tregime të zgjedhura (Selected stories) - 1972
- Baltë nga kjo tokë (Mud from this land) - 1973
- Në një cep të Ilirisë së poshtme (In a corner of southern Illyria) - 1983
- Këngë e britma nga qyteti i djegur (Songs and cries from the burnt city)
- E madhe është gjëma e mëkatit (Great is the lament of sin) - 1993
- Ditar i ekonomistit' (The Economist's Diary) - 2012
- Netë moldave' (Moldovian Nights) - 2015

=== Translations ===
- Eluard, Selected verses
- Gogol, St Petersburg tales and Dead Souls
- Haxhi Agaj, Persian tales
- Ivan Krylov, The Fables
- Lu Xun, Selected works
- Mikhail Saltykov-Shchedrin, The Golovlyov Family
- Pablo Neruda, Que despierte el leñador
- Pushkin, Novels
- Turgeniev, A Sportsman's Sketches;
