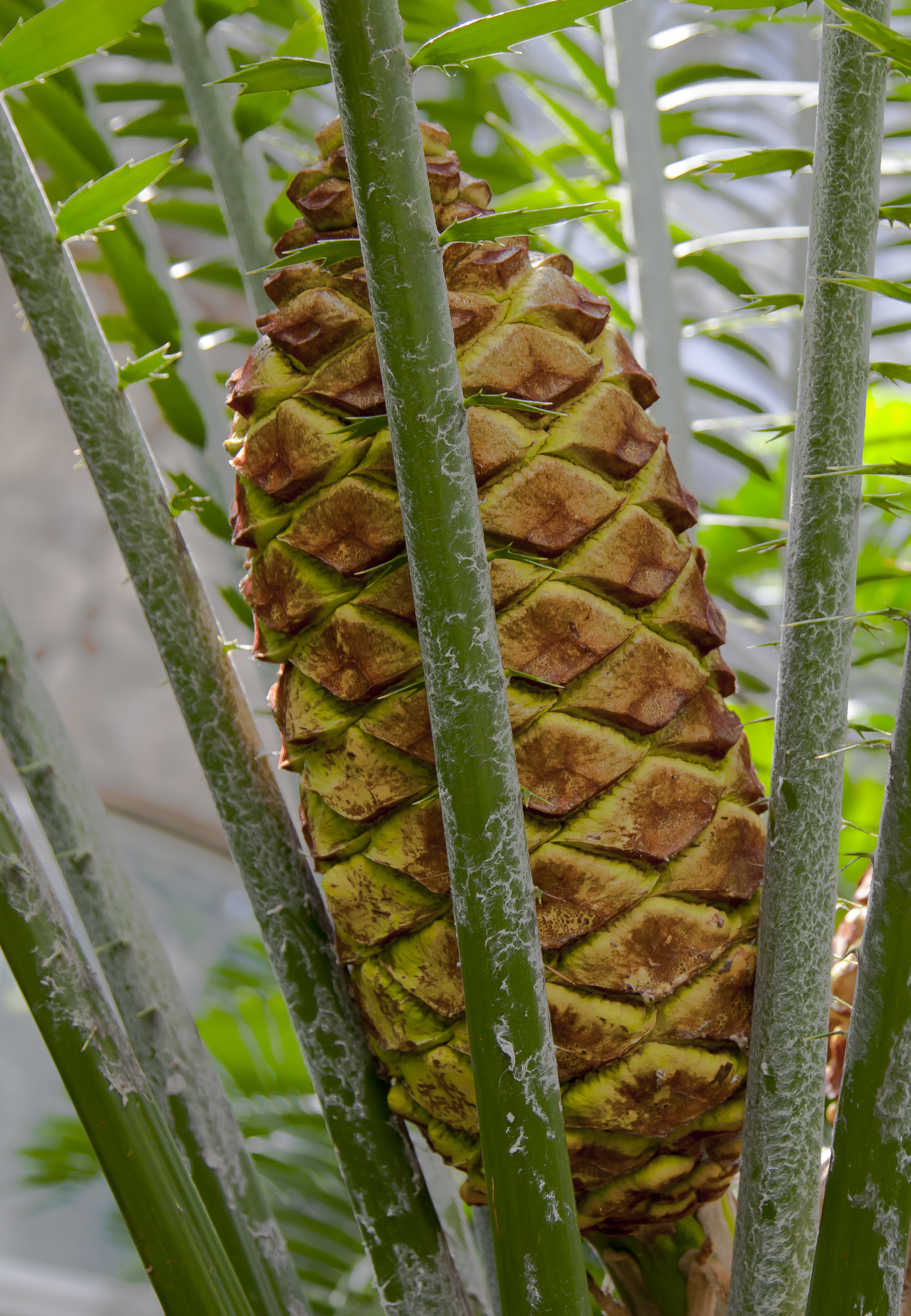

Conservation status
- Near Threatened (IUCN 3.1)
- CITES Appendix I

Scientific classification
- Kingdom: Plantae
- Clade: Tracheophytes
- Clade: Gymnospermae
- Division: Cycadophyta
- Class: Cycadopsida
- Order: Cycadales
- Family: Zamiaceae
- Genus: Encephalartos
- Species: E. laurentianus

Binomial name
- Encephalartos laurentianus De Wild.

= Encephalartos laurentianus =

Species of cycad

Encephalartos laurentianus, commonly called the malele or Kwango giant cycad, is a species of cycad that is native to northern Angola and southern Democratic Republic of Congo, along their common border on the Kwango River.

== Description ==
It is the largest of all cycads, with multiple stems both upright and prostrate, each as much as 15 m (49 ft) in length, and bearing a rosette of massive once-pinnate fronds 4–7 m (13–23 ft) in length, 70–100 cm (28–39 in) in width (the leaflets 35–50 cm (14–20 in) long and 4–7 cm (1.6–2.8 in) wide), and with a petiole or stalk up to 8 cm (3.1 in) thick where it joins the stem or trunk. Each stem can be up to 100 cm (39 in) thick. The pollen cones are 17–35 cm (6.7–13.8 in) long, and the seed cones 35–40 cm (14–16 in) long. This is also said to be the fastest growing cycad, producing up to five "flushes" (rosettes, or clusters) of leaves each year. The species was discovered in 1902 by Louis Gentil, and named after the 19th century Belgian botanist Emile Laurent.
