= Vikentij Makušev =

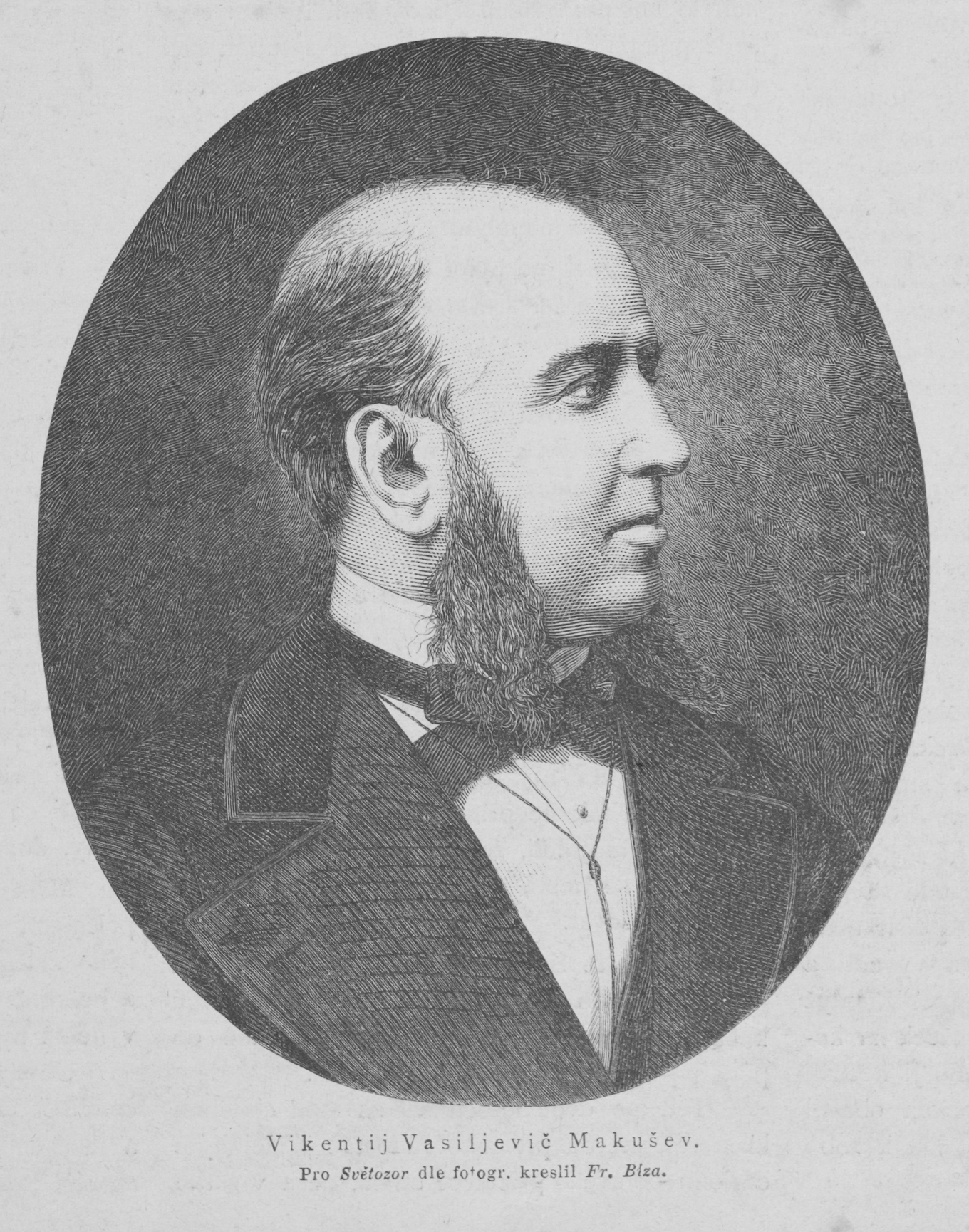
- Born: Викентий Васильевич Макушев; 10 November 1837
- Died: 1883
- Occupations: Slavist and Albanologist
- Known for: works about Dubrovnik

Vikentij Makušev (Russian: Викентий Васильевич Макушев) (1837—1883) was a Russian Slavist and Albanologist. He is best known because of his works about Dubrovnik.

He was born on 10 November 1837 in Brest Litovsk. His father was military engineer. His mother died in 1847 of cholera. In period between 1856 and 1860 he studied at University of Petrograd. In January 1863 Makušev was appointed as Russian consul in Dubrovnik where he spent five years researching archives of Dubrovnik.

Makušev was a professor at University of Warsaw. In Warsaw in 1871 he published his work "Historical researches on the Slavs in Albania in the Middle Ages" in which he presented the result of his research of over three thousand historical documents he studied in archives of Venice, Naples, Palermo, Milan and Ancona. The archival data he collected in archives in Italia is of great importance for the history of south Slavs. Makušev was described as Bulgarophile.

== Bibliography ==
- Istoričeskie pamjatniki južnych slavjan i sosědnich im narodov, izvlečennye iz Ital'janskich archivov i bibliotek: Čast' I, men'ščie archivy iěkotoryja biblioteki; Kniga 1, Ankona, Bolon'ja, Florencija. Tip. Varšavskago Učebnago Okruga. 1874.
- Istorijski spomenici južnih Slovena i okolnik naroda iz italijanskih arhiva i biblioteka ispisao Vićentije Makušev, Kń. 2. Typogr. regni Serbiae. 1882.
- Benova, Mantova, Milano, Palermo, Turin. Typographia Regni Serbiae. 1882.
