= Bajrić =

Bajrić is a Bosnian patronymic surname and may refer to:

- Edin Bajrić (born 1980), Bosnian painter and sculptor
- Kenan Bajrić (born 1994), Slovenian footballer
- Zana Bajric (born 1993), Attorney at Law
