= Baric =

Baric is a surname, and may refer to:

- Amanda Baric, Australian anaesthetist
- Gordana Baric (born 1944), Australian lawn bowls competitor
- Ralph S. Baric (born 1954), American virologist

== See also ==
- Barić, surname
- Barič, village in Serbia

}
