= Henrik Barić =

Croatian linguist (1888–1957)

Henrik Barić (Dubrovnik, 21 January 1888 – Belgrade, 3 April 1957) was a Croatian linguist and Albanologist.

== Biography ==
Henrik Barić was born on 21 January 1888 in Dubrovnik in a poor clerical family. He was a Professor in the University of Belgrade during the interwar period, and in the newly established University of Sarajevo during the 1950s. Barić was the director of the Institute of Balkan Studies and the founder of the Archives for Albanian Antiquity, Language and Ethnology.

He died on 3 April 1957 at the age of 69 in Belgrade.

== Works ==
- Barić, Henrik (1955). Hymje në historinë e gjuhës shqipe. Prishtinë.
