= Peter Schubert (diplomat) =

German Albanologist and diplomat

Peter Schubert (born 1938 in Dresden, died 1 October 2003 in Berlin) was a German albanologist and diplomat. He worked more than 35 years in the diplomatic service of the former GDR and was an ambassador to Albania.

== Life and career ==
1956 - 1959 Peter Schubert studied as one of the first Germans at the newly founded University of Tirana Albanian language, literature and history. 1961 he acquired a diploma in linguistics at the Humboldt University of Berlin with a work on the Albanian alphabet.

1962 he entered the diplomatic service of the GDR and worked until 1971 in the Foreign Ministry. During this time he was also twice stationed in the East German embassy in Tirana.

1971-1973 he was sent to an additional studies to the Diplomatic Academy of the Foreign Ministry of the USSR in Moscow.

From 1974 to 1989 he worked again as a Balkans expert in the Foreign Ministry of the GDR. 1989-1990 his career as diplomat ts height, when he acted as the last ambassador of the GDR in Tirana. In this function he experienced at the same time the collapse of the communist systems in both countries - East Germany and Albania.

The end of the GDR and the German reunification forced him a professional reorientation: So he used his deep knowledge as expert and his experience as diplomat in Albania for becoming an advisor for politics and economics. He worked in research projects on Albania and Kosovo and completed several studies on both countries.

== Publications ==
- Albanien im Umbruch (Albania in Upheaval). SWP, Ebenhausen 1992.
- Zündstoff im Konfliktfeld des Balkan. Die albanische Frage. (Explosive Matters in Conflict Fields of the Balkans. The Albanian Question). Baden-Baden 1997.
- Reflexionen zur politischen Kultur in Albanien (Reflections on Political Culture in Albania), In: Südosteuropa, 2001, No. 10-12.
- Albanische Identitätssuche im Spannungsfeld zwischen nationaler Eigenständigkeit und europäischer Integration. (Albanian search for identity in Tension Field Between national Independence and European Integration). Frankfurt 2005. ISBN 3-631-52933-3.
