= Norbert Jokl =

Austrian Albanologist

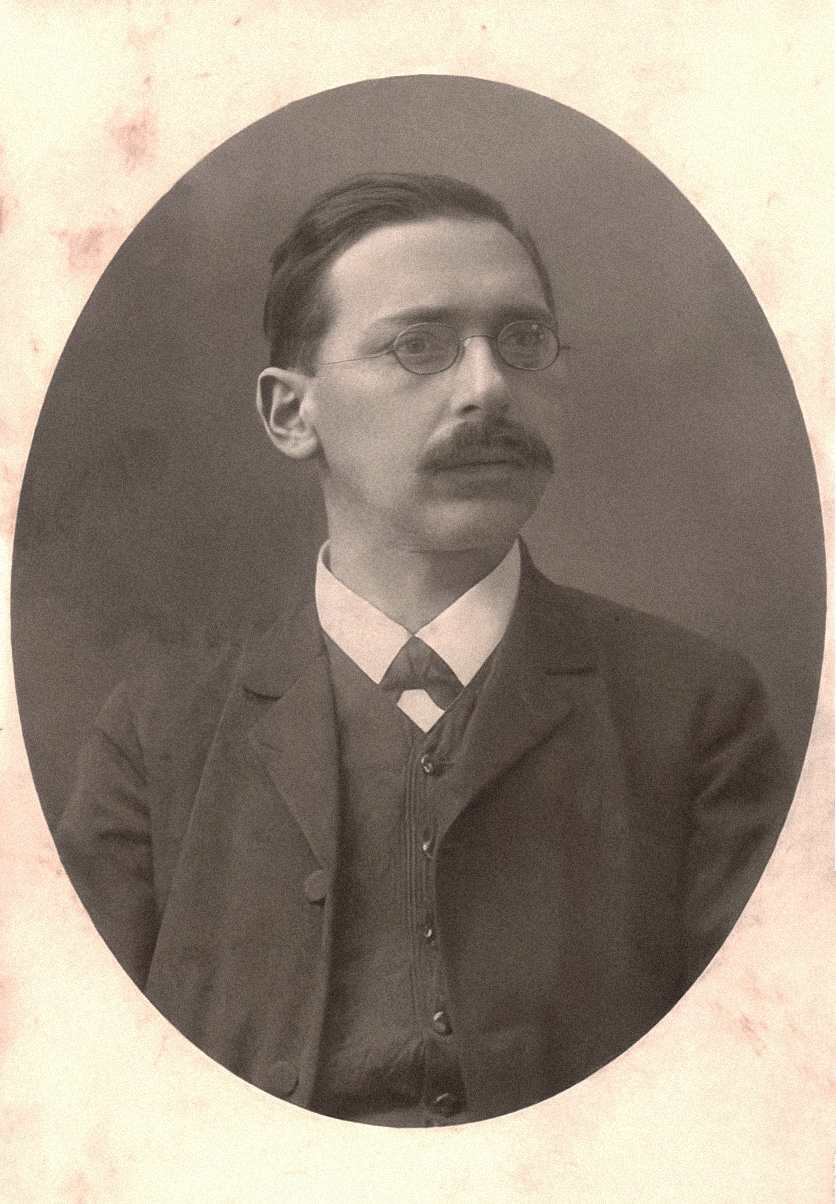
- Born: February 25, 1877; Bisenz, Southern Moravia (now Bzenec, Czech Republic)
- Died: probably May 1942 (aged 64–65); Maly Trostenets, Belarus or Roßau, Vienna, Austria
- Education: University of Vienna
- Occupation: Albanologist
- Years active: 1903—1942

Norbert Jokl (February 25, 1877 – probably May 1942) was an Austrian Albanologist of Jewish descent who has been called the father of Albanology.

== Early life ==
Jokl was born in Bzenec (then Bisenz), Southern Moravia (now the Czech Republic), to Heinrich, a merchant, and Emilie née Haas. His older brother, Wilhelm, died in 1895 at the age of 21. He graduated from high school cum laude and entered the University of Vienna to study law. He graduated summa cum laude on June 23, 1901.

== Further education ==
Eventually Jokl abandoned his pursuit of legal training, and he decided to devote himself to linguistics. He studied Indo-European linguistics, Slavistics, and Romanistics, eventually receiving a cum laude degree.

In the late autumn of 1903, he started training in the library of the University of Vienna, where he would work until 1938. At the age of 30, he began to actively study the Albanian language, a linguistic field that had not been widely studied at the time.

== Career ==
From 1913, he was a Privatdozent whose field was "Indo-European linguistics with special consideration to Albanian, Baltic and Slavic languages". In 1923, he became a Professor extraordinarius, and in 1937 a Hofrat. He wrote numerous works on Albanology and became a renowned specialist. In April 1933, the paleontologist and Albanologist Franz Nopcsa (Ferenc Nopcsa) shot his secretary and himself, leaving his Albanological papers to Jokl.

After Adolf Hitler came to power in Germany, Jokl's manuscripts started being rejected and he was no longer invited to conferences. On May 20, 1938, he was discharged as a result of the Anschluss of Austria and was prohibited from entering his former place of work. The Dean of the Faculty of Philosophy, Viktor Christian, tried to save Jokl's job, but this was in vain. Later that year, Jokl submitted an application (supported by the Dean) to be equalized with "persons of mixed blood of 1st degree“ in order to have admittance to libraries. The application was rejected.

Georg Solta, who went on to become a professor of Indo-European linguistics, would often visit him during the following four years, in order to further his studies and to maintain personal interaction with his mentor. Solta says that Jokl lived alone ascetically, though a maid would prepare food for him. Two rooms were filled with books and all of his free time was dedicated to research.

Jokl tried to find a job abroad, but this was also in vain. His last chance was a librarian position that was created for him in Albania with a monthly salary of 600 Albanian franks. Franciscan priest and Albanian national writer, Gjergj Fishta, intervened through a letter, dated 23 September 1939 to Francesco Jacomoni, vice-regent in Albania to make Italy intervene with the Third Reich in order to allow Jokl transfer to Albania. Jokl himself wanted to emigrate to Albania. However, neither the efforts of Gjergj Fishta, nor those of Carlo Tagliavini, a professor of the University of Padua, nor the appeal of Galeazzo Ciano, Minister of Foreign Affairs of Italy, to the Ministry of Foreign Affairs of Germany, yielded the necessary permission for him to emigrate to Albania. In one of his applications, he also asked for permission to take along his library, but was opposed by Dean Christian, who was very interested in keeping Jokl's extensive collection at the University. Jokl's library also contained his life work and the handwritten supplements to the Albanian vocabulary by Gustav Meyer.

== Arrest and death ==
On March 4, 1942, Jokl was arrested by the Gestapo and transferred to the collection camp (Sammellager). Georg Solta, trying to save his teacher, appealed for Jokl's freedom to Ernst Kaltenbrunner, the SS Gruppenführer in Vienna who had also been Solta's schoolmate. However, Kaltenbrunner argued he had no power to save Jokl from deportation.

There is contradictory information as to Jokl's death. It was reported that on May 6, 1942, he was taken to Maly Trostenets near Minsk, where he was murdered. However, according to another version, he died from mistreatment in a barracks in Roßau, Vienna.

After Jokl's arrest, his former employer tried to ensure that Jokl's library would be given to the University in case Jokl was not allowed to go to Albania. However, the Dean preferred that Jokl be sent to a concentration camp, as that would make acquisition of his works much easier. Paul Heigl, the director general of the National Library of Austria, also applied for custodianship of the collection. Despite Jokl's bequeathing the library to Albania, it was confiscated on April 27, 1942 and sent to the National Library. In 1946, the Austrian National Library retained the holdings on the grounds that Jokl had not left any eligible relatives. Of the original more than 3,000 books, only about 200 can now be identified. Jokl's life's work, an edition of the Etymological Dictionary of Albanian by Gustav Meyer, with handwritten addendas, is untraceable.

== Posthumous honors ==
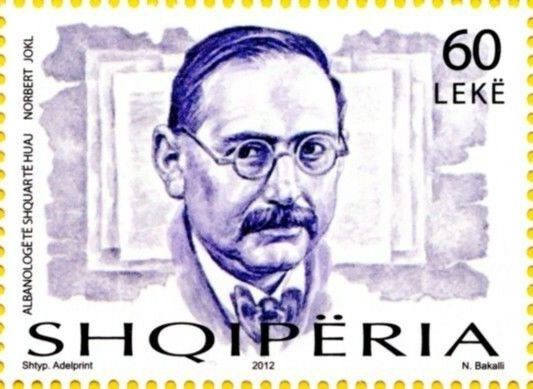
2012 Stamp of Albania featuring Jokl

On April 29, 1982, the Senate of the University of Vienna decided to inscribe Norbert Jokl's name to the board of honour of the University.

In 2012, Posta Shqiptare, the national postal service of Albania, honored Jokl with a postage stamp in a series commemorating foreign Albanologists, linguists who have studied the Albanian language. Also honored in the series were Eric Hamp and Holger Pedersen.

== Bibliography ==
- 1923 Linguistisch-kulturhistorische Untersuchungen aus dem Bereiche des Albanischen, Berlin–Leipzig.
