= Skënder Rizaj =

Albanian scholar and historian (1930–2021)

- Born: 14 March 1930; Peć, Kosovo, Kingdom of Yugoslavia
- Died: November 28, 2021 (aged 91)
- Education: University of Skopje BA; University of Sarajevo PhD
- Occupation: Historian

Skënder Rizaj (Serbian: Скендер Ризај, Skender Rizaj) (14 March 1930 – 28 November 2021) was a Kosovar Albanian scholar and historian.

== Career ==
Rizaj was born in Peć, Kosovo, Kingdom of Yugoslavia on 14 March 1930. He finished primary and high school in his hometown and completed normal school in 1946-1947. Rizaj earned his BA in History from Skopje University in 1956 and his doctorate from Sarajevo University in 1965. He was one of the founders of the Department of History at the University of Pristina, where he taught from 1965 until he retired in 1987. Additionally, he also worked as a Special Consultant for Turkish State Archives in Istanbul from 1989 to 1990. In 2010, Rizaj was awarded the title of "Educator Emeritus" by the Kosovan government.

== Works ==
Rizaj undertook extensive research in Turkish Archives in Istanbul, and the British Library in London. During his studies, he mastered Serbian language, Ottoman Turkish, as well as modern Turkish language and English. He has written extensively on Albanian history, with an emphasis on Kosovo. His works include the 1982 book Kosovo during the 15th, 16th, and 17th centuries and the university textbook History of the New Era (1453-1789), published in 1985.

== Publications ==
Rizaj's most notable publications include:

- Mining in Kosovo and surrounding regions from the 15th to 17th Centuries (Doctoral Dissertation), Pristina, 1968
- The Albanian League of Prizren in English Documents, 1878-1881, Pristina, 1978
- Kosovo during the 15th, 16th, and 17th Centuries, Rilindja Publishing, Pristina, 1982
- History of New Era 1453-1789, University of Pristina Textbook, 1985
- The Albanians and the Serbs in Kosovo, Zeri i Rinise Publishing, Pristina, 1991
- Kosova and Albanians, Yesterday, Today and Tomorrow, Pristina, 1992
- Kosova, Albanians and Turks, Yesterday, Today and Tomorrow, Yayinevi Publishing, Istanbul, Turkey, 1993
- English Documents on the Albanian League of Prizren and the start of the Disintegration of the Balkans, 1877-1885, Pristina, 1996
- The Albanian's Historical Right to Self-Determination, Pristina, 2005
- The Falsifications of Serbian Historiography, Pristina, 2006
