= Stavro Skëndi =

Albanian American linguist and historian

Stavro Skëndi (1905 in Korçë – August 17, 1989 in Long Island) was an Albanian-American linguist and historian.

== Career ==
Skendi was an academic at Columbia University between 1951 and 1972. While at Columbia, he received a Guggenheim Fellowship during 1963. Outside of Columbia, Skendi went to the Institute for Advanced Study as a Visiting Fellow.

== Selected works ==
- Gjendja e Shqiperise sot dhe detyra e Shqiptarvet. (The situation of Albania today and the duty of the Albanians.) Konference e dhene ne Detroit, me 19 prill, 1953. Detroit 1953.
- Albanian political thought and revolutionary activity, 1881–1912. München 1954.
- Albanian and South Slavic oral epic poetry. American Folklore Society, Philadelphia 1954.
- The Political Evolution of Albania, 1912-1944. Mid-European Studies Center, New York 1954.
- Albania. (With Mehmet Beqiraj, George Bossy, Robert F. Byrnes.) Atlantic Pr., London 1957.
- Mendimi politik dhe veprimtarija kryengritese shqiptare, 1881–1912. (Political opinion and the activities of the Albanian uprising, 1881–1912) New York 1958.
- The history of the Albanian alphabet: a case of complex cultural and political development. R. Oldenbourg, München 1960.
- The emergence of the modern Balkan literary languages: a comparative approach. Otto Harrassowitz, Wiesbaden 1964.
- Crypto-Christianity in the Balkan area under the Ottomans. American Association for the Advancement of Slavic Studies, 1967.
- The Albanian national awakening, 1878-1912. Princeton University Press, Princeton, N.J. 1967.
- Kačić's "Razgovor" and Fishta's "Lahuta e Malcís". Wiesbaden 1968.
- Language as a factor of national identity in the Balkans of the nineteenth century. American Philosophical Society, Philadelphia 1975.
- Balkan cultural studies. East European Monographs, Boulder, [Colo.]; distributed by Columbia University Press, New York 1980.
- Zgjimi kombëtar shqiptar: 1878-1912. (The awakening of the Albanian nation: 1878–1912.) Tirana/Phoenix 2000.
