= Gustav Meyer =

Gustav Meyer (25 November 1850 – 28 August 1900) was a German linguist and Indo-European scholar, considered to be one of the most important Albanologists of his time, most importantly by proving that the Albanian language belongs to the Indo-European family.

== Life and works ==
Meyer was born in Groß Strehlitz in the Prussian Province of Silesia (present-day Strzelce Opolskie in modern Poland). In 1867 he enrolled in the Breslau University (now University of Wrocław) to study classical philology, Indo-European languages, Modern Greek, and Sanskrit. He was there influenced by philologists Martin Hertz and Adolf Friedrich Stenzler. In 1871 he defended his dissertation De nominibus graecis copositus. In the same year he was named assistant professor at the University of Göttingen, and a year later professor of ancient languages in the same university.

He went on to work as a gymnasium teacher in Gotha, from 1874 in Malá Strana, Prague at the intercession of Wilhelm von Hartel, and was appointed outside lecturer (Privatdozent) at the Charles University in 1876. The next year he was named professor of Sanskrit and comparative linguistics at the University of Graz, where he pursued studies of Ancient Greek, Turkish, and Albanian. During this period he published his study Contribution on the theory of word-formation in Greek and Latin (1872).

Full professor at the University of Graz from 1881, Meyer started to focus his studies on albanology, and prepared the foundations of the discipline by publishing the following works:

1. Albanesische Studien, I, (1883); II, (1884);
2. Etymologisches Wörterbuch der albanesischen Sprache, Strassburg, (1891);
3. Kurzgefasste albanesische Grammatik, Leipzig, (1888);
4. "Zum indogermanischen - Perfectum auf die albanesische Formenlehre", published in the Miscellanea di filologia e linguistica in memoriam by Napoleone Caix and Angelo Canello, Florence, (1886);
  [Note: The German title is broken; secondary sources mention a work Der Einfluss des Lateinischen auf die albanesische Formenlehre in Miscellanea di Filologia dedicata alla Memoria dei professori Caix e Canello]
5. Die lateinischen Elemente im Albanesischen, published in Gustav Gröber's Grundriss der romanischen Philologie, I, Strassburg, (1888).

Meyer is considered to be the linguist who proved scientifically that the Albanian language belongs to the Indo-European family. He is known to have held a long correspondence with Jeronim de Rada, a leading Albanian figure of the Albanian National Awakening.

Gustav Meyer died on August 27, 1900, in Straßgang near Graz. In honour of his contributions to Albanology, a grammar school in Tirana, Albania bears his name.
