= Jacques Bourcart =

French geologist and oceanographer (1891–1965)

Jacques Bourcart (5 June 1891 – 24 June 1965) was a French geologist and oceanographer who was involved in producing undersea topographical maps of the Mediterranean Sea. He was a professor of geology at the Paris-Sorbonne University. He came up with the continental flexture theory to explain the terrain off Morocco.

== Early life and education ==
Bourcart was born in Guebwiller, Haut-Rhin and grew up studying at Remiremont. He initially studied medicine but moved to the natural sciences and worked with the oceanographers Paul Marais de Beauchamp and Louis Joubin but became very interested in Morocco. During World War I, he was posted into the Albanian borders where he became interested in the region.

== Career ==
Bourcart's 1922 doctoral thesis made use of data collected during his Albanian posting, supported by his superior during the war, Marshal Franchet d'Espere, dealt with the geography of Albania but his work included material on the Albanian people and their language, and he was known for his discursive storytelling.

He produced the first geological map of the region at a 1:200,000 scale. He became a director of the Cherifian Institute at Morocco in 1925 and began to study the region, collaborating with Louis Gentil whom he succeeded as director, and after visiting the Canary Islands, he once again became interested in oceanography.

He returned to Paris in 1933, and from 1936 he taught at Paris-Sorbonne University, becoming a full professor in 1950 and conducted studies on the seabed and ocean sediment. One his students was Claude Francis-Boeuf, but his career was stopped by an accident in Ethiopia in 1952.

He began to examine the Mediterranean Sea, examining the undersea canyons, the topography, and collecting sediments. He proposed continental flexture to explain the topography of the North African coast and submarine valleys. He was made an officer of the Legion of Honour in 1959 and elected to the Academy of Sciences in 1960.
