= Agniya Desnitskaya =

Soviet and Russian linguist

- Born: Agniya Vasilyevna Desnitskaya; 23 August 1912; Sedniv, Chernigov Governorate, Russian Empire
- Died: 18 April 1992 (aged 79); Saint Petersburg, Russia
- Occupation: Linguist

Agniya Vasilyevna Desnitskaya (Russian: А́гния Васи́льевна Десни́цкая) (23 August 1912 — 18 April 1992) was a Soviet and Russian linguist, a specialist in Indo-European languages, esp. Germanic languages and the Albanian language, literature and folklore. Professor of Leningrad State University, candidate member of the USSR Academy of Sciences via Department of Literature and Language (from 26 June 1964).

Her first works cover Indo-European and Germanic questions (in line with Leningrad Grammatical School); Desnitskaya later specialized herself as an Albanologist, becoming in effect the first specialist in Albanian philology in Russia and the founder of Albanology in Saint Petersburg. Her more important works are "History of Albanian literature" (1987) and a description of Albanian language and its dialects (1968).

== Bibliography ==
=== Works on Albanian language ===
- «Славянские заимствования в албанском языке» (1963)
- «Реконструкция элементов древнеалбанского языка и общебалканские лингвистические проблемы» (1966)
- «Албанский язык и его диалекты» (1968).

== Sources ==
- https://slovar.cc/enc/bse/1992558.html
