= Ernest Koliqi =

Albanian journalist, politician, translator, teacher and writer (1903-1975)

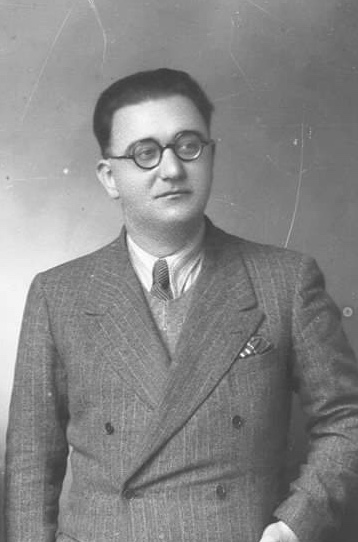
- Portrait of Ernest Koliqi, 1938
- Born: 20 May 1903; Shkodër, Ottoman Empire, present day Albania
- Died: 15 January 1975 (aged 71); Rome, Italy
- Education: Università degli Studi di Padova
- Occupations: Politician; teacher; translator; writer
- Writing career
- Pen name: Borizani, Hilushi or Hilush Vilza
- Language: Albanian; Italian
- Genre: Realism

Ernest Koliqi (20 May 1903 – 15 January 1975) was an Albanian journalist, pro-Axis politician, translator, teacher and writer.

== Biography ==
Born to a Catholic Albanian family in Shkodra, where he also attended his first lessons at the local Jesuit College. In 1918 his father send him to study in the jesuit directed "Cesare Arici" college, in Brescia; and afterwards in Bergamo. Then at the University of Padua, and became knowledgeable in Albanian folk history. He began to write under pseudonyms, such as Hilushi, Hilush Vilza and Borizani. In the 1920s and 1930s Koliqi was the founder of leading magazines in Albania, such as the Illyria magazine, and others, which covered geography and culture in the country. He also was Minister of Education at the time of the fascist puppet Albanian Kingdom during World War II, when he sent two hundred teachers to establish Albanian schools in the occupied Yugoslav area of Kosovo.

As a writer many of his literary works were banned even though he had political connections, which is partly why they were banned for this very reason because of his political views. He became creative in prose, and together with Mitrush Kuteli is considered the founder of modern Albanian prose. He translated into Albanian the works of the great Italian poets: Dante Alighieri, Petrarch, Ludovico Ariosto, Torquato Tasso, Giuseppe Parini, Vincenzo Monti, and Ugo Foscolo. He distinguished himself in the translation of an anthology of Italian poetry in 1963.

In his books such as Hija e Maleve (English: The Shadow of the Mountains), 1929, Tregtar flamujsh (English: Flags' Merchant), 1935, and Pasqyrat e Narçizit (English: The Mirrors of Narcissus), 1936, Koliqi brings a unique spirituality to Albanian literature.

He died in Rome in 1975.

== Works ==
=== Literary works ===
- Skanderbeg's Call (Albanian: Kushtrimi i Skanderbeut), (1924)
- The Shadow of the Mountains (Albanian: Hija e maleve) (1929)
- The Traces of the Seasons (Albanian: Gjurmat e stinëve) (1933)
- Flags' Merchant (Albanian: Tregtar flamujsh) (1935)
- The Mirrors of Narcissus (Albanian: Pasqyrat e Narçizit) (1936)
- Symphony of the Eagles (Albanian: Symfonia e shqypeve) (1936)
- The Albanian Popular Epic (Albanian: Epika popullore shqiptare), PhD thesis at the University of Rome.(1937)
- The Fences of the Awakening (Albanian: Kangjelet e Rilindjes) (1959)
- The Taste of the Leavened Bread (Albanian: Shija e bukës mbrume) (1960)
- Albania (1965)

=== Translations ===
- The Great Poets of Italy (Albanian: Poetët e mëdhenj të Italisë) in two volumes, 1932 & 1935;
- The Mountain Lute (Albanian: Lahuta e Malcís) parts of it in Italian.

=== Other legacy ===
- Founder and director of Shkëndija magazine, (English: The Spark);
- Founder and publisher of Shêjzat (English: The Pleiades), Rome, 1957-1973.
