= Mati Logoreci =

Albanian educator, linguist and publisher

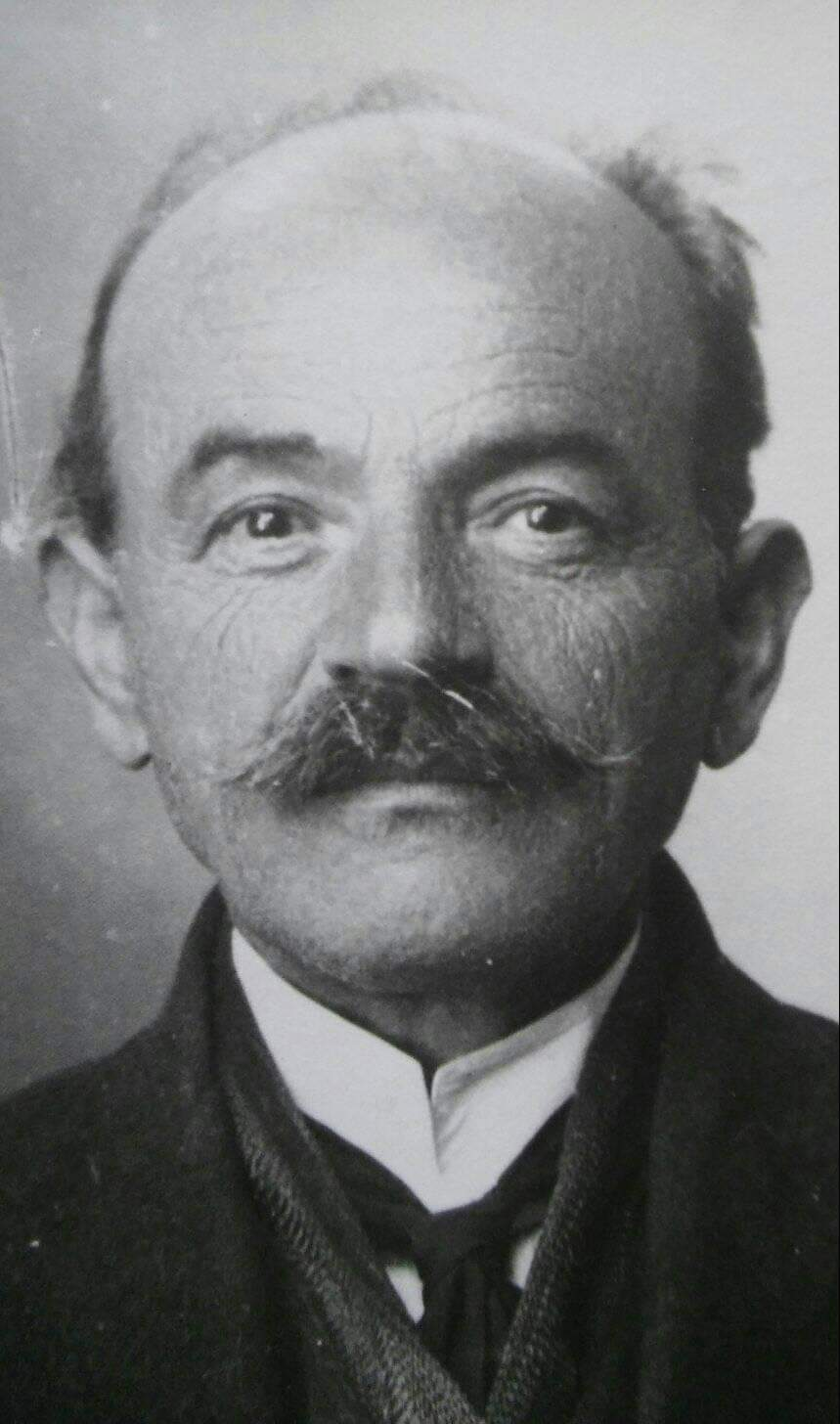
- Born: 10 February 1867; Shkodër, Ottoman Empire
- Died: 7 February 1941 (aged 73); Tirana, Albania
- Occupations: Educator, linguist, publisher
- Years active: 1889–1937
- Spouse: Paulina (m. 1894)
- Children: 4
- Relatives: Marie Logoreci (daughter-in-law); Ndre Mjeda (first cousin)
- Awards: Order of the Crown of Italy; Order of Skanderbeg; "Mësues i Popullit"

Mati Logoreci (10 February 1867 – 7 February 1941) was an Albanian educator, linguist, and publisher from Shkodër, and was one of the active figures associated with the Albanian National Awakening.

He is primarily recognized for establishing the first Albanian-language primary school in Prizren in 1889 and for his extensive work authoring school textbooks. Logoreci was a delegate at the Congress of Monastir in 1908, which established the modern Albanian alphabet, and later served as a key member of the Albanian Literary Commission (1916–1918). He also participated in the Congress of Lushnjë (1920) and played a central role in the early organization and development of the National Library of Albania following its foundation that same year.

== Early life ==
=== Education and early career ===
Mati Logoreci was born on 10 February 1867 in Shkodër to Frano Logoreci and Marije Thaçi. He received his early education in his hometown, eventually attending a technical commercial school where he developed a strong foundation in economics and trade. Logoreci became a polyglot, achieving proficiency in Albanian, Italian, French, and German. He continued his formal studies for four years at the Saverian College (Kolegjia Saveriane) in Shkodër, a Jesuit institution that provided him with advanced training in commerce.

Following his education, Logoreci worked as an apprentice for the Parruca trading company, which sent him to work as an accountant in Monfalcone, near Trieste. It was during this period abroad that he came into contact with the patriotic literature of the Albanian National Awakening. He studied the works of prominent figures such as Jeronim de Rada, Dora d'Istria, and Zef Serembe, whose writings on Albanian identity and independence deeply influenced his future career as an educator and nationalist.

=== Personal life ===
In September 1894, while living in Prizren, Logoreci married Paulina (born 1878), with whom he had four children: Kolë, Gjon, Marta, and Shaqe. His eldest son, Kolë Logoreci, Knight of the Order of Skanderbeg, became a prominent economist and civil servant who served as the head of the state budget department under King Zog I. Kolë was married to the celebrated actress and "Honor of the Nation" recipient, Marie Logoreci.

== Educational career ==
Following his work as an accountant in Monfalcone, Logoreci traveled to France for a short period of specialized study. After his return to Albania, his uncle, Archbishop Andrea Logorezzi (Logoreci) encouraged him to be a teacher after he observed a critical shortage of Albanian-language teachers. His uncle sent both of his nephews, Mati to Prizren in the Kosovo Vilayet and Pashko was sent to Gjakova. On 1 May 1889, Logoreci opened a private Albanian-language primary school in Prizren, which is recognized as one of the first of its kind in the region. At the time, the Ottoman Empire heavily restricted Albanian-language schooling; however, Logoreci was able to operate the institution under the protection of the Catholic Church and with the support of the Austro-Hungarian "Kultusprotektorat." He later resigned following a conflict with the consulate, establishing a second private school in 1899 that enjoyed widespread local support. The two institutions merged in 1900.

The school initially struggled with a lack of resources and official textbooks. To address this, Logoreci began authoring his own pedagogical materials. His work as a teacher in Prizren lasted for over a decade, during which he became a central figure in the local intellectual resistance against Ottoman cultural policies. In 1899, he was joined by his first cousin, Ndre Mjeda (their mothers were sisters), and together they founded the Agimi (The Dawn) literary society, which aimed to create a unified Albanian alphabet and publish schoolbooks in the native tongue.

Logoreci worked as a teacher in Prizren until 1903 when he transferred to the school of Franciscan Church of Shkodër where he continued to teach and refine his linguistic theories, eventually leading to his participation in the national congresses of the early 20th century.

== Linguistic and political activism ==
Logoreci's involvement in the national movement intensified through his work in publishing and linguistic reform. On 14 November 1907, he began publishing the biweekly periodical Dashamiri (The Well-wisher) in Trieste. Printed using the Agimi alphabet, which utilized diacritics instead of digraphs to represent Albanian sounds, the publication served as a vehicle for nationalistic and educational ideas until it ceased operation in August 1908 after fourteen issues.

In November 1908, Logoreci served as a voting delegate at the Congress of Manastir, representing the Agimi society of Shkodër. He attended the historic assembly alongside Ndre Mjeda, as well as prominent figures Gjergj Fishta, Hilë Mosi, and Luigj Gurakuqi. While Logoreci and Mjeda initially advocated for the Agimi alphabet, they ultimately joined the consensus to adopt the unified Latin-based script that remains the standard for the Albanian language today.

Following the Congress of Manastir, Logoreci returned to Shkodër where, in 1908, he collaborated with Lazër Mjeda (brother of Ndre Mjeda) to organize an Albanian night school for adult literacy. During this period, he published the 201-page textbook Ndolliina historijet t'motshme (1911), which covered the ancient history of Illyria, Macedonia, and Epirus, as well as overviews of ancient Egypt and Greece.

During World War I, Logoreci was a key member of the Albanian Literary Commission (Komisia Letrare Shqype), established in Shkodër under Austro-Hungarian administration (1916–1918). Working with scholars such as Aleksandër Xhuvani, he contributed to the first official efforts to standardize Albanian orthography and school curricula. Following the Congress of Lushnjë in 1920, where he served as a delegate for Shkodër, Logoreci played a significant role in the linguistic "Albanianization" of the new state's administration.

In 1920, Logoreci introduced the term “bashki” to designate the municipal administration of Shkodër, replacing the Ottoman Turkish term belediye, which had been used during the late Ottoman period. The designation was subsequently adopted for municipal institutions throughout Albania and remains the standard Albanian term for a municipality today. Following these contributions, Logoreci moved to the newly established capital, Tirana, to join the Ministry of Education.

On 10 July 1920, the Ministry of Education established the National Library of Albania and placed it under Logoreci's direction. His leadership in the civil service continued to rise; from 1922 to 1923, he served as the Secretary-General of the Ministry of Education. In the final years of his career, on 28 November 1936, he founded the newspaper Drita (The Light). Under his editorship, it became the most widely circulated Albanian newspaper prior to World War II, reaching a circulation of 4,000 copies.

In 1937, Logoreci was appointed to a prestigious state commission tasked with selecting a new national anthem to replace the existing one, which some leaders felt lacked a purely Albanian spirit. He served on this committee alongside prominent intellectuals such as Parashqevi Qiriazi, Karl Gurakuqi, Lasgush Poradeci, Odhise Paskali and others. The project was never fully realized as a musical composition and the original anthem remained in use.

Throughout his career, Logoreci maintained extensive professional collaborations with leading scholars and national figures across the Albanian territories and abroad. Beyond his familial and linguistic partnership with Ndre Mjeda, he was a close associate of figures such as Gjergj Fishta, Luigj Gurakuqi, and Aleksandër Xhuvani. He also maintained a professional correspondence with the prominent Austrian albanologist Norbert Jokl, exchanging ideas on the standardization and development of the Albanian language.

Logoreci remained an active voice in Albanian cultural life until his death in Tirana on 7 February 1941.

== Published works ==
Logoreci authored numerous textbooks and pedagogical materials designed to standardize the Albanian language and provide a national curriculum for the newly established schools. His works include:

=== Textbooks and primers ===
- Abetari i shqipes (The Albanian Primer, 1899) – Developed for use in the Prizren school.
- Natyra (Nature, 1900) – A natural sciences textbook for primary education.
- T'ndodunit e histories së shenjtë (Events of Sacred History, 1903) – A religious history text.
- Historia e përgjithshme (General History, 1905) – One of the first comprehensive history textbooks in the Albanian language.
- Arithmetika (Arithmetic, 1907) – A mathematics text tailored for elementary students.
- Mësimi i këndimit (Reading Lessons, 1912) – A literary reader designed to improve literacy rates.
- Ndolluni historije t'motshme (Events of Ancient History, 1911)

=== Periodicals and editorial work ===
- Dashamiri (The Well-wisher, 1907–1908) – A biweekly periodical published in Trieste focused on education and national identity.
- Drita (The Light, 1936) – A high-circulation newspaper founded in Tirana that served as a major intellectual forum prior to World War II.

=== Linguistic contributions ===
- Rregullat e orthografisë së gjuhës shqipe (Rules of Albanian Language Orthography, 1917) – Co-authored during his tenure with the Albanian Literary Commission.

== Awards and recognitions ==
Logoreci received several prestigious honors during the period of the Italian and Albanian Kingdom and was posthumously recognized by the Albanian state for his foundational contributions to national education:

- Kingdom of Italy: Knight of the Order of the Crown of Italy (Cavaliere dell'Ordine della Corona d'Italia) - 1929
- Kingdom of Albania: Commander of the Order of Skanderbeg (Komandar I Urdhrit të Skënderbeut) - 1930
- Republic of Albania: Teacher of the People ("Mësues i Popullit"), posthumously -1987

== Legacy ==
Several institutions and landmarks in Albania and Kosovo have been named in honor of Mati Logoreci to commemorate his contributions to national education:

- Mati Logoreci Primary School (Shkodër): A prominent 9-year school in his birthplace.
- Mati Logoreci School (Prizren): Named in honor of his founding of the first Albanian school in the city in 1889.
- Rruga Mati Logoreci: There is a street named after him in Tirana.
- National Library of Albania: The library maintains a permanent photo of Mati Logoreci in its main hall to honor him.

== See also ==
- Education in Albania
- Education in Prizren
