= Agimi =

Albanian literary society

Agimi (the Dawn) was an Albanian literary society founded in Shkodër, Ottoman Empire in 1901.

Agimi was founded on 15 July 1901, in Shkodër (today's Albania) with the initiative of Catholic clerics Lazër Mjeda and Ndre Mjeda (brothers). Other member would be writers and publicists Anton Xanoni, and Mati Logoreci. It aimed at stimulating the use of Albanian language in literature, in particular by means of a new alphabet.

The Mjeda brothers were initially members of the literary society Bashkimi. They moved own with their own society due to divergences on the future standard Albanian alphabet. Bashkimi had generated its own script, known as Bashkimi Alphabet which was based on pure Latin script. Ndre Mjeda advocated for a more complex alphabet based on the Croatian model with the used of diacritic letters, such as ž or č, in order to generate a distinct letter for each distinct sound. This would be known as Agimi alphabet.

Current alphabet:	A a	B b	C c	Ç ç	D d	Dh dh	E e	Ë ë	F f	G g	Gj gj	H h	I i	J j	K k	L l	Ll ll	M m	N n	Nj nj	O o	P p	Q q	R r	Rr rr	S s	Sh sh	T t	Th th	U u	V v	X x	Xh xh	Y y	Z z	Zh zh			
Agimi alphabet (reordered):	A a	B b	C c	Č č	D d	Đ đ	E e	Ə ə	F f	G g	Ǵ ǵ	H h	I i	J j	K k	L l	Ł ł	M m	N n	Ń ń	O o	P p	Ḱ ḱ	R r	R̃ r̃	S s	Š š	T t	Þ þ	U u	V v	Dz dz	Dž dž	Y y	Z z	Ž ž	Q q*	W w*	X x*

(*only in foreign words)

Sample text in the Agimi alphabet:

Kelit i fali lala ńi mołə tə bukurə. Sá škoj nə špiə i þa Linəsə, sə moterəsə. „Ḱyr sá e bukurə âšt kəjo mołə! Eja e t’ a dájmə baškə.“ „Me kênə mã e mađe, i þa e motəra, kišimə me e daə baškə; por mbassi âšt aḱ e vogelə, haje vetə.“ „Ani ča? þa Keli, t’ a hámə baškə, se mə vjen mã e mirə.“

Kəndime pər škołə tə para tə Šḱypəniəsə: Pjesa e parə, at Albanian National Library, f. 100.

Agimi alphabet was presented in 1902 at the International Congress of Orientalists, which was held in Hamburg, German Empire. It received a favorable reception by the Austro-Hungarian and German scholars. In 1908, it was one of the three candidate alphabets presented at the Albanian Congress of Monastir (in today's Bitola). The society was represented by Ndre Mjeda and Mati Logoreci. Based on Congress delegate's votes it lost to Gjergj Fishta's Bashkimi alphabet and ranked third, so it wasn't adopted.
The society members published many works during their active lifespan, some of them in the new alphabet. Such were Logoreci's work Dašamiri (The Patron), published in Trieste, 1907. Ndre Mjeda and Anton Xanoni also published a number of readers for Albanian schools.

== See also ==
- Society for the Publication of Albanian Letters
- Mjeda family
