= Territorial Abbey of Orosh =

Former Benedictine abbey in Albania

Coordinates: 41.8618°N 20.0715°E

- Abacia e Shën Llezhrit të Oroshit
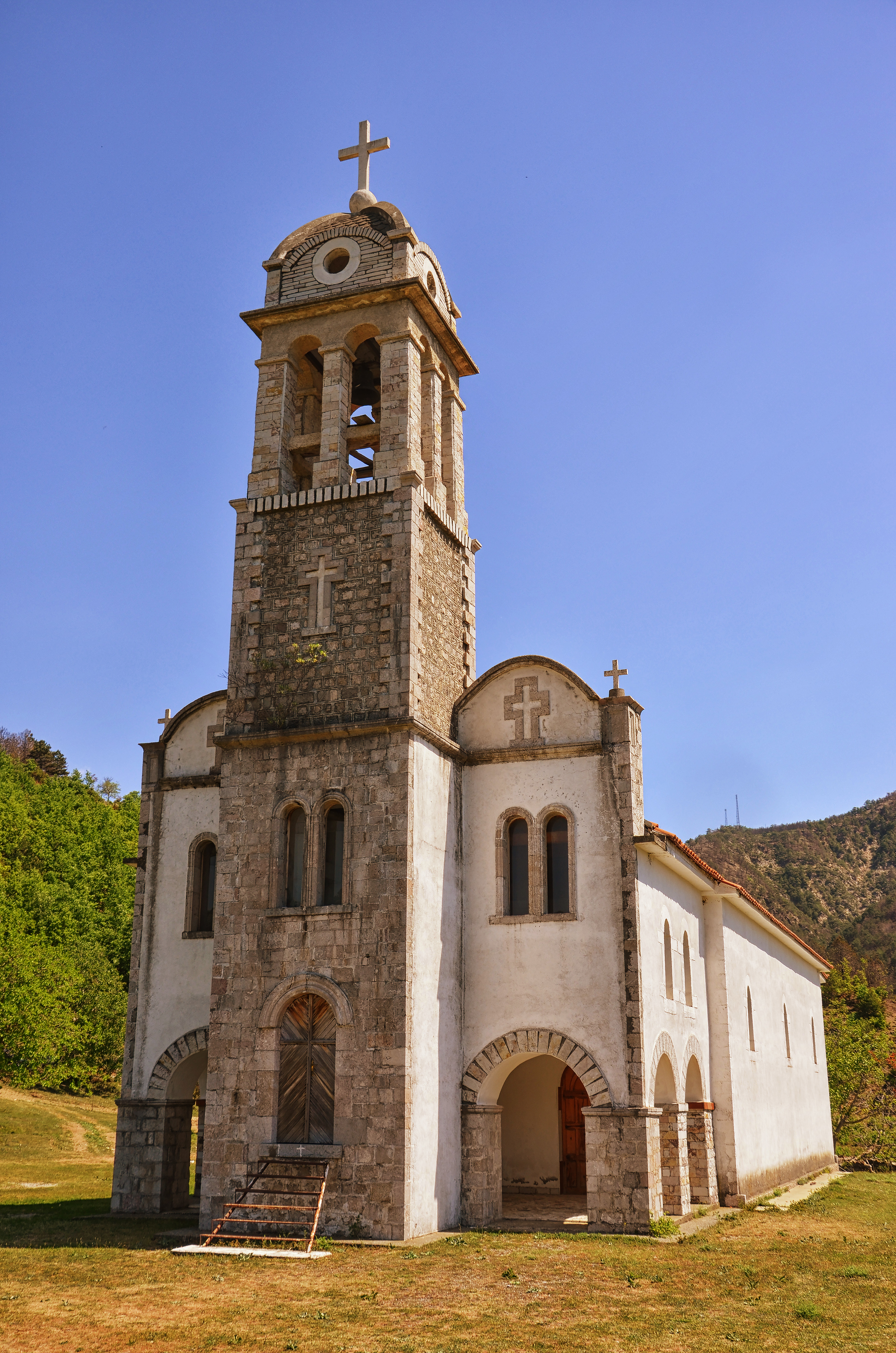
- Interactive map of Territorial Abbey of Orosh

Monastery information
- Order: Catholic Church in Albania
- Diocese: Rrëshen

Site
- Location: Mirditë municipality, Albania

The Abbey of Orosh (also known as Mirditë Abbey or St. Alexander Oroshi) was a territorial Benedictine abbey at Orosh in the region of Mirdita, Albania. It was destroyed during the communist era and now rebuilt, dedicated to the martyr St. Alexander.

== History ==
By papal decree of 25 October 1888, this abbey with its two affiliated parishes, together with five other parishes in the Diocese of Lezhë (Alessio) were removed from the jurisdiction of the Bishop of Lezhë.

In 1890 three parishes from the Diocese of Sapë were added to the territorial Abbey of Orosh, and, in 1894, five more parishes from Lezhë were added.

In the early 20th century, Catholics numbered 16,550 in Albania, being under the care of secular and regular clergy. The abbot was chosen from among the secular clergy. The abbot, Primus Docchi, who resided at Orosh was born at Bulgëri, 7 February 1846, and studied at the Propaganda College in Rome. The Franciscans had a parish and a hospital at Gomsiqe.

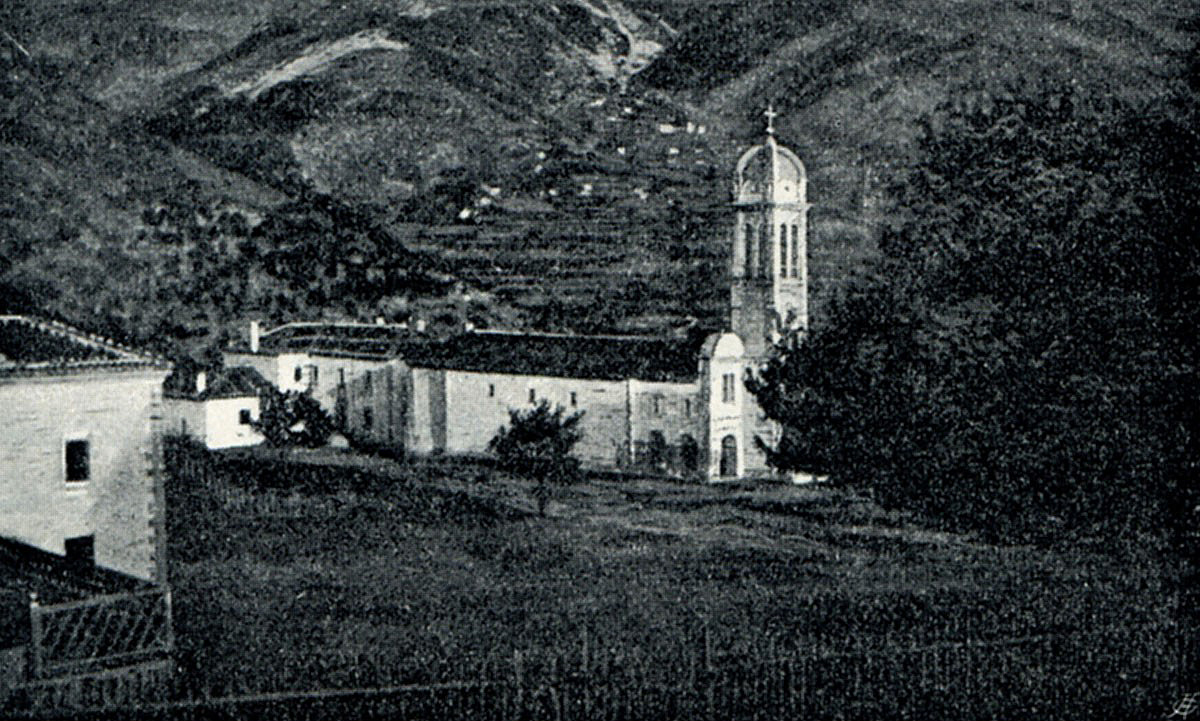
The church of Orosh in 1903

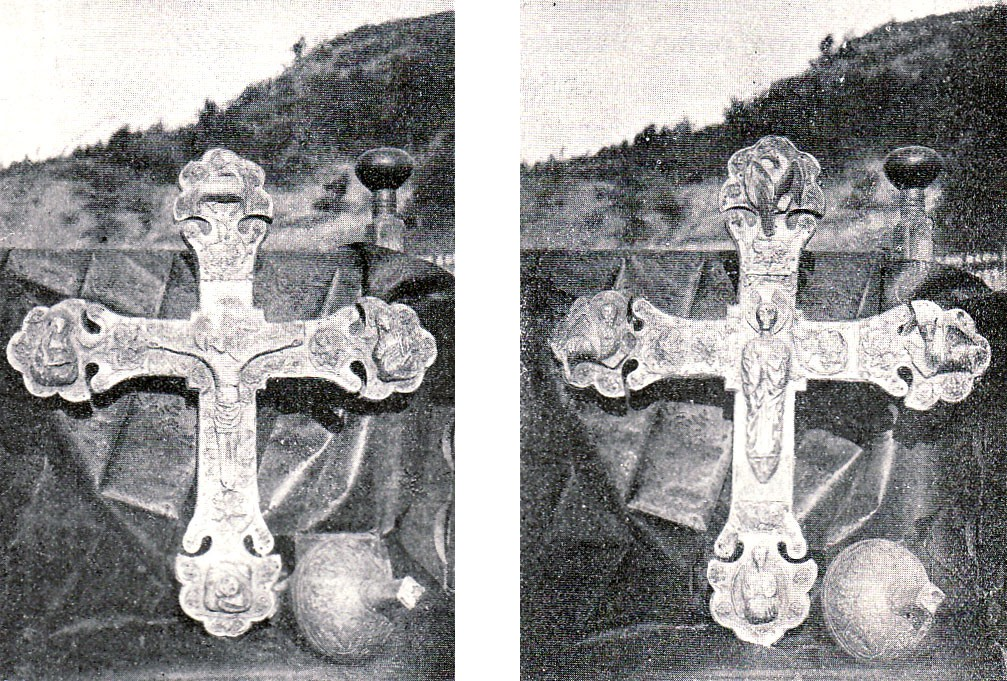
Processional cross at the Church of St Alexander in Orosh, Mirdita (1890s)

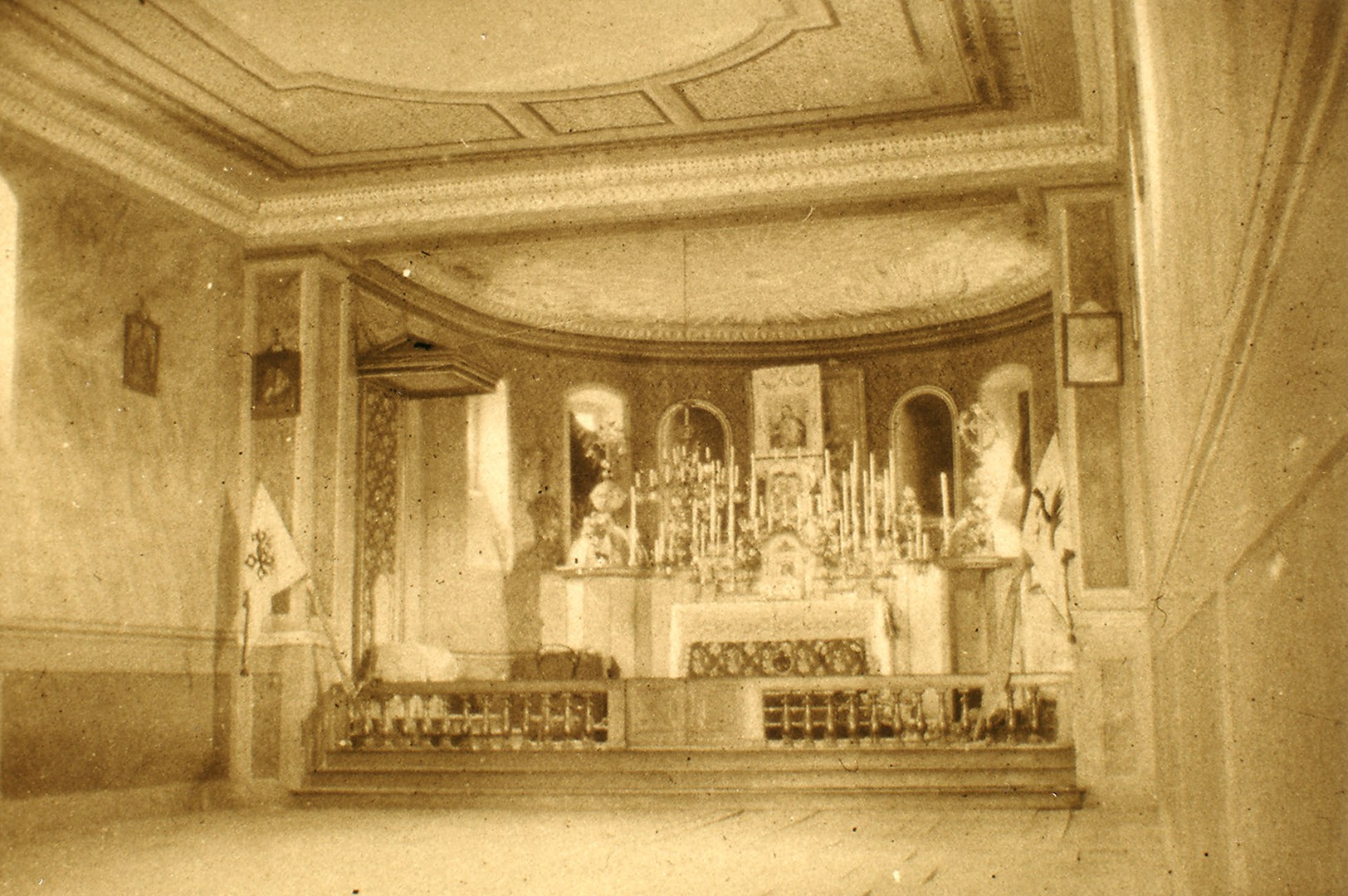
Interior of the Church of Saint Alexander of Orosh (1905)

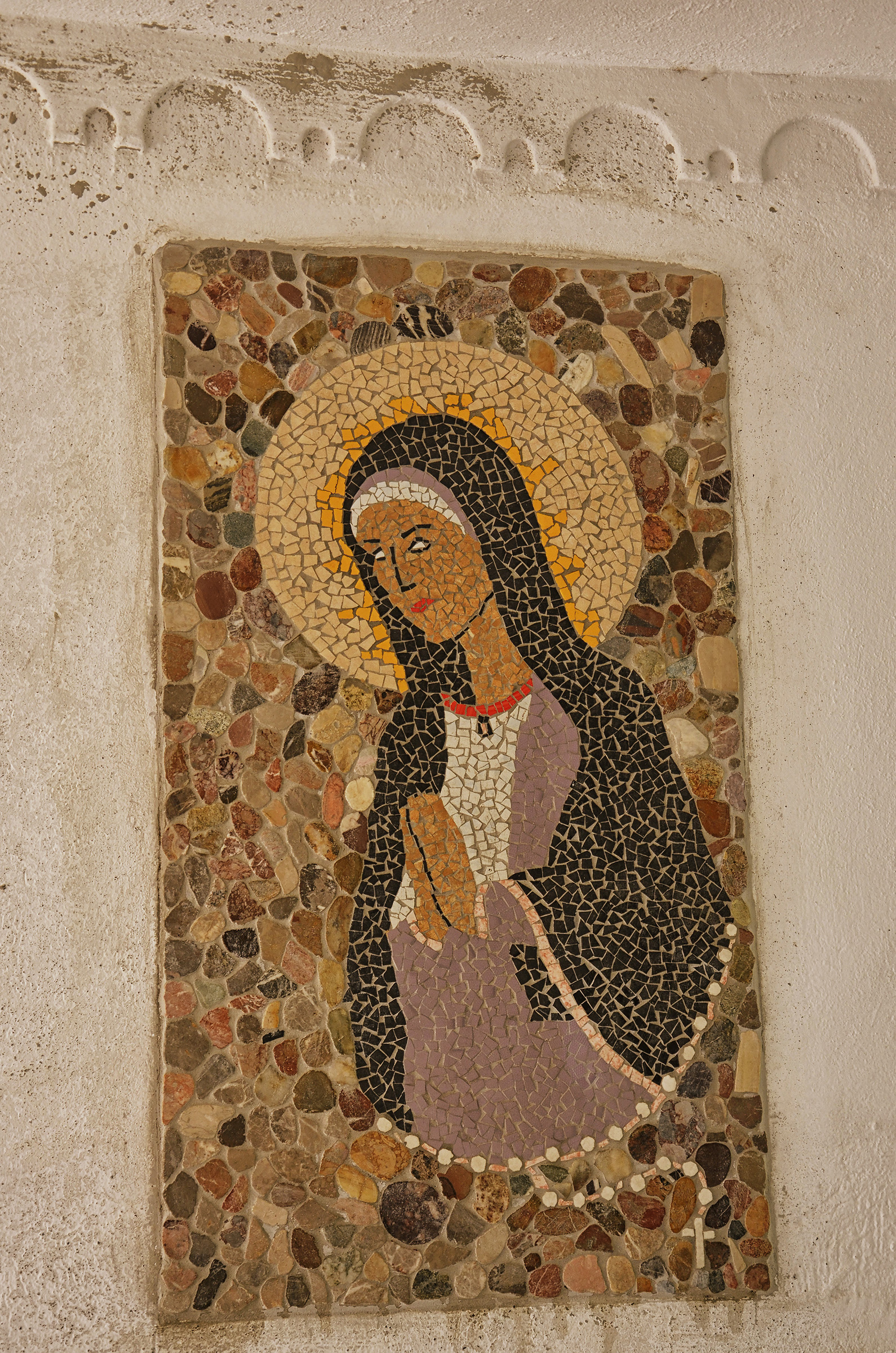
Madonna mosaic in the portico of Orosh Church (2018)

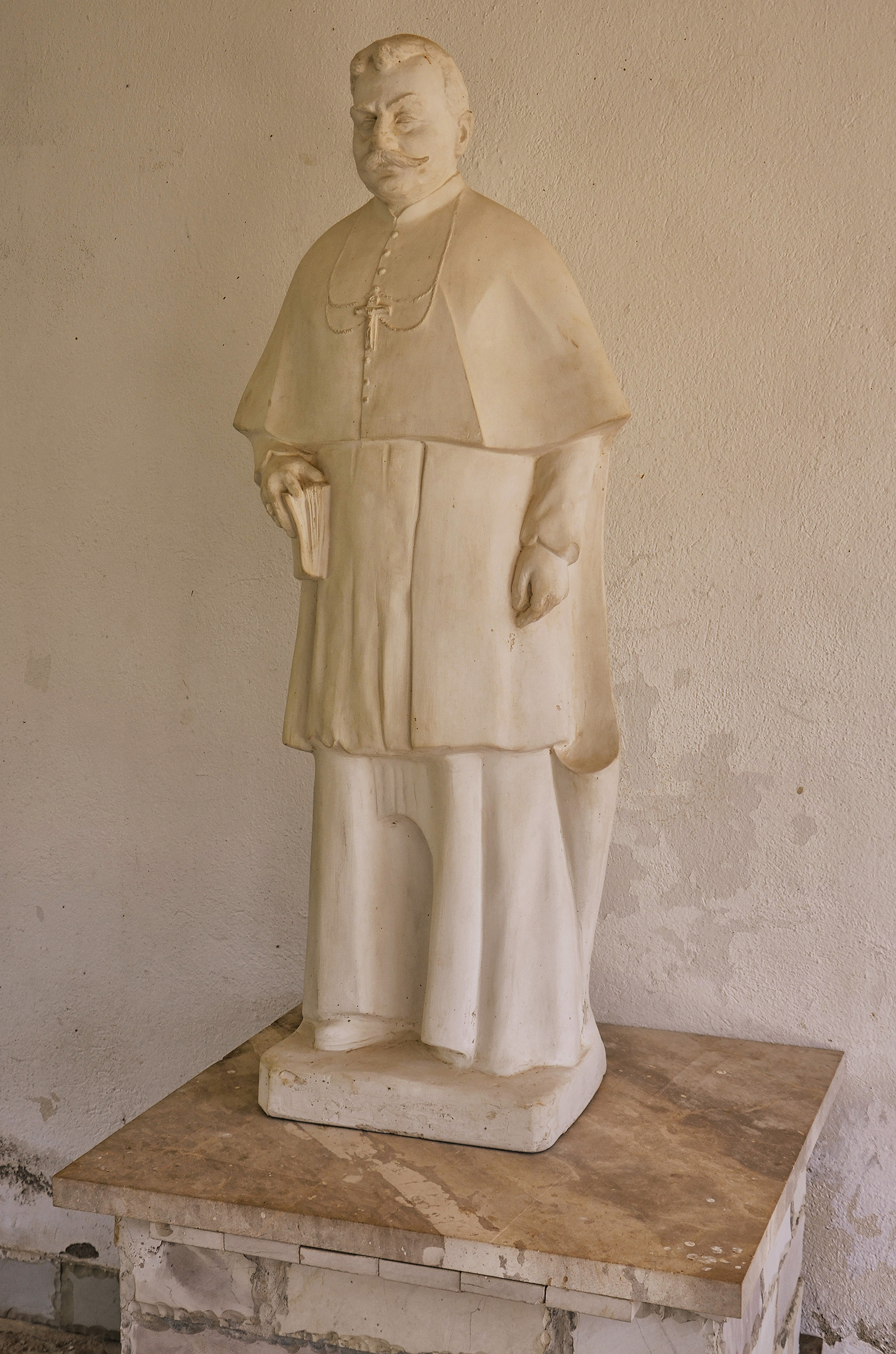
Sculpture of Preng Doçi in the portico of Orosh Church (2018)
