= Jesuits in Albania =

The Jesuits in Albania refers to the Jesuits and Jesuit missions in Albania.

== History ==
=== First contact ===
The first contacts between the Society of Jesus and the Albanians took place in the 16th century, when the Jesuits trained Albanian clergy in different colleges. Those colleges included the Greek College of Saint Athanasius in Rome, the Illyrian College of Loreto and later the College of the Propagation of Faith in Rome.

The Jesuits didn’t exclusively teach Albanian Catholic clergy, in some occasions Albanian Orthodox clergy were prepared as well.

A large number of Arbëreshë clergy from Calabria and Sicily were educated in the Greek College of St. Athanasius. One of those students was Luca Matranga, who would later be known for translating the first Albanian catechism. The Greek College of St. Athanasius educated Basilian missionaries, who went to Himarë in Southern Albania to preach for unity among the Catholics and the Orthodox.

Albanian bishop Frang Bardhi, who wrote a fundamental work for Albanian literature, the Latin Epirotic Dictionary and later wrote the biography of Scanderbeg, was Jesuit-educated via the Illyrian College of Loreto and the College of Propaganda Fide. Other prominent Albanian Christian figure, Pjetër Bogdani was equally prepared by the Jesuits in the Illyrian College of Loreto and later in the College of the Propagation of Faith.

=== First missions ===
In 1595, Jesuit missionary Tommaso Raggio accompanied by Catholic missionary Aleksandar Komulovic visited Albania. Prior to their mission, the two missionaries translated and publicized the first catechism in Albanian. During his stay, Raggio handed 500 copies over to the locals.

In 1841, three Jesuits arrived in the city of Shkodër in northern Albania. The three Jesuits were Vincenzo Basile, Giuseppe Guagliata, and Salvatore Bartoli. Vincenzo Basile was the founder of the Albanian Jesuit mission. According to 20th century Jesuit scholar Giuseppe Valentini, Guagiliata's mother was of Arbëresh descent and probably taught her son the Arbëresh variety of the Albanian language. This would allow Guagiliata, once he settled in Albania, to quickly learn to communicate in the Gheg dialect with the people of Shkodër.

=== Educational institutions ===
Discussions with the Propaganda Fide for the possible foundation of an inter-diocesan seminary in Albania started in 1834. In 1842, the Bishop of Shkodër, Luigi Guglielmi, confirmed that the Propaganda Fide approved his request to open a seminary in the city. The seminary would train Albanian clergy and would be of assistance to all Albanian dioceses and cities. Impressed by the missionary activities of the three Jesuits who had settled in the city, Guglielmi and the local clergy agreed that the seminary would be put under their leadership. The building was to be constructed next to the Muslim neighborhood of the city, which stirred controversy among some Muslims who did not want the seminary close to their homes. Nonetheless, the local Ottoman ruler of the city Abdi Pasha assured that no harm would come to the Jesuits and on January 22, 1843, the seminary was completed. However, the situation for the Jesuits would change dramatically only six days later when the new pasha, Osman Pasha, was appointed to govern the city. Fearing an increase of foreign influence in the city, Osman Pasha banned all Catholic liturgical functions, which made it impossible for the Jesuits to pursue their missionary activities. The new seminary was destroyed and all the Jesuits together with the bishop were expelled from the Ottoman Empire. Five years later, Jesuit Claudio Stanislao Neri tried to rebuild the seminary but ultimately failed and was also expelled from the city.

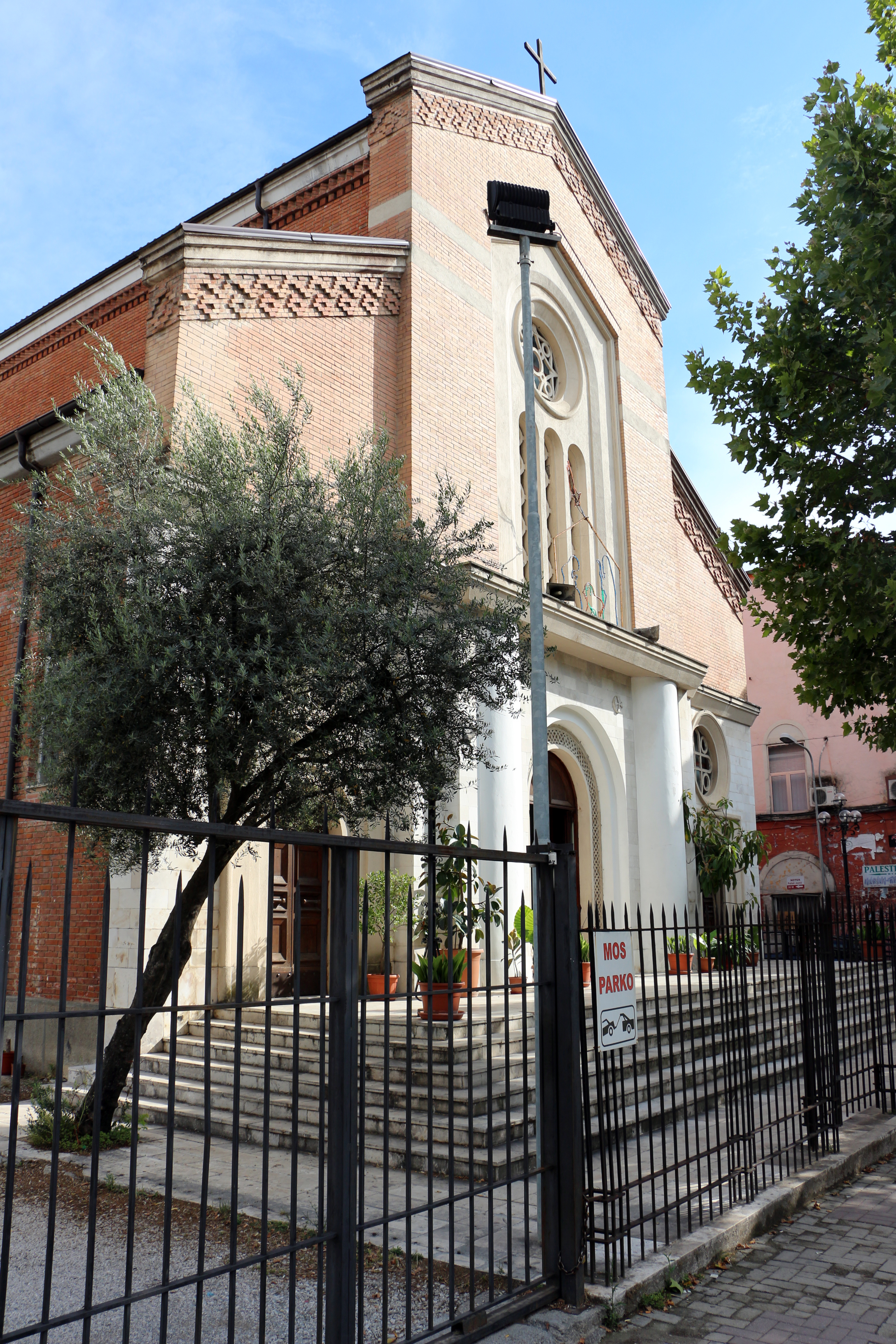
A Jesuit church in Tirana

The persecution of the Albanian Catholics by Ottoman officials created a diplomatic crisis between the Austrian Empire and the Porte. In 1856, Austria deployed a military presence in the mouth of the Bunë river near Shkodër. Austria warned the Ottoman Empire that if the oppressions against the Christians did not stop, they would invade the city. After negotiations to resolve the dispute ended, the Ottoman Empire agreed to reimburse the damages inflicted upon the Catholics and to punish the officials responsible for the persecutions. The inter-diocesan seminary was finally rebuilt and inaugurated in 1861 under the name Kolegja Shqyptare (Albanian Seminary). A year later it became known as the Albanian Pontifical Seminary and was put under Jesuit leadership.

During his visit at the seminary in 1868, the Jesuit Provincial, Giovanni Marcucci decided that the language of instruction for the seminarians would be changed from Italian to their native tongue, Albanian. Due to a lack of existing published writings and books in Albanian, Marcucci started the enterprise of translating major literary works of Catholic scholars in the Albanian language. The translation of those works would significantly contribute to the development of the Albanian literature and culture.

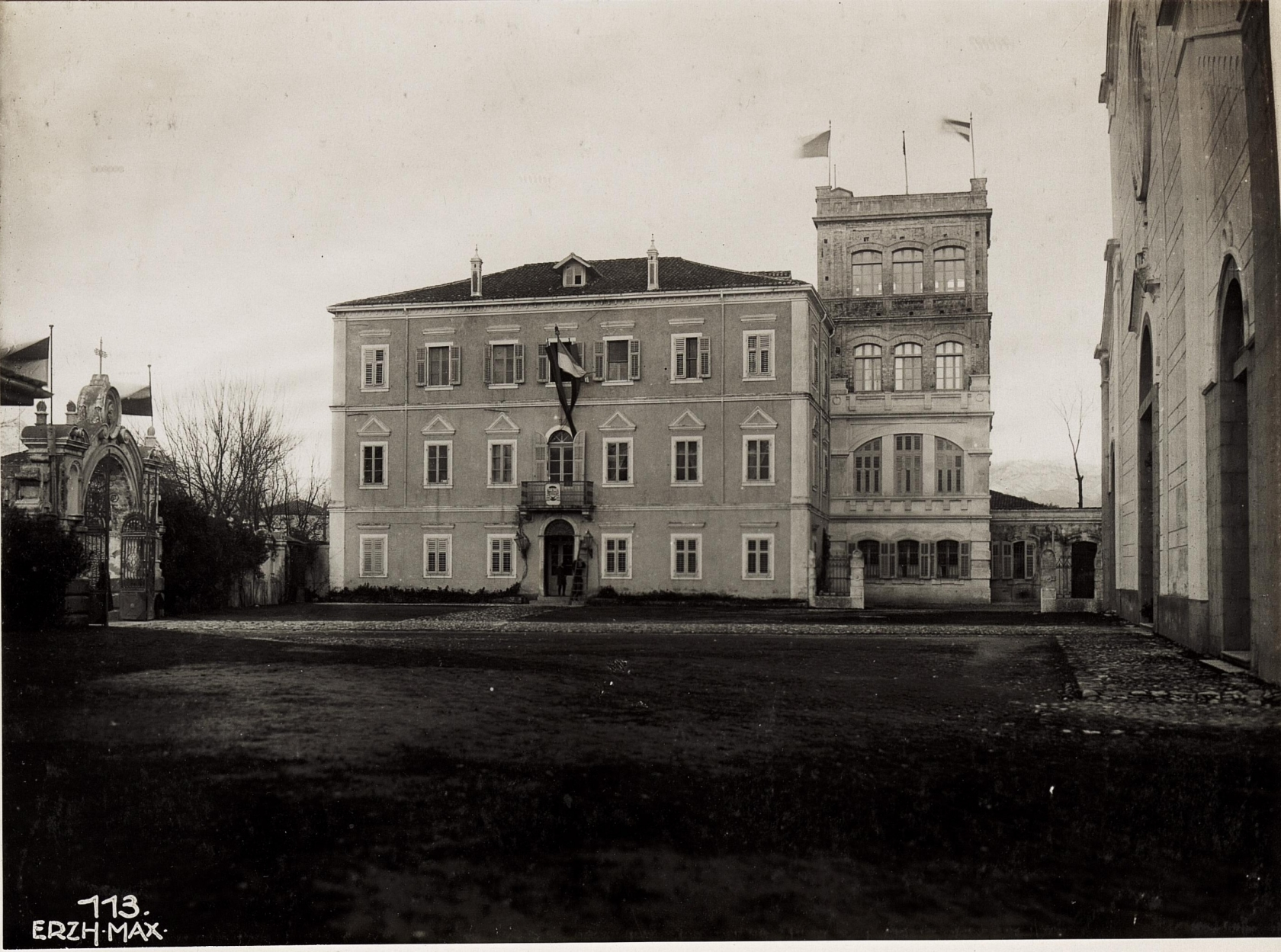
Building that served as the Saint Xavier College in Shkodër

Another educational institution that was founded by the Jesuits was the Saint Francis Xavier College in Shkodër, which was inaugurated on October 17, 1878. The founder of the institution was Luigi Ignazio Mazza. Austria-Hungary supported the college financially, which allowed the Jesuits to handle out free textbooks to the students. The curriculum of the institution consisted of a humanistic and a technical-commercial orientation, with both orientations being centered around the study of the Catholic faith. The study of the Albanian language was part of the college's curricula, even when the Albanian language was prohibited by the Ottomans. After Albania declared its independence, many of the college's alumni would become important political, religious and cultural figures of the country. Some of those elites included Faik Konica, Luigj Gurakuqi and Ndre Mjeda.

=== Publications ===
The Jesuits established a printing press in Albania, in 1870. The enterprise was named Shtypshkroja e Zojës së Papërlyeme (Immaculate Conception Printing Press) and published literary works in Albanian, despite the fact that usage of the language was banned. During the first five decades after its creation, the Immaculate Conception Printing Press published around 471 literary works. The first book written by the press in Albanian was "Dotrina e Kerscten" (Christian Doctrine) by Engjell Radoja (1820–1888).The Immaculate Conception Printing Press remained the only printing press in Albania until 1908.

In 1891, the press published the first Albanian-language magazine in Albania, the Sacred Heart Messenger (Lajmëtari i Zemrës së Krishtit; then known as Elçija i Zemrës së Krishtit). Issues of the magazine were published every month and discussed topics concerning Albanian culture and language. The magazine used the standard form of the Albanian alphabet, after it was established during the Congress of Manastir in 1908. This helped intensify a sense of national unity among Albanians, since many of them learned to write and read via the Sacred Heart Messenger.

In 1908, two Jesuits, Shtjefën Zadrima and Francisco Genovizzi, founded another periodical in Albania, the Vepra Pijore. The magazine published around 50 volumes on literature about Albanian poetry.

On December 9, 1928, a student organization affiliated to the St. Xavier College was founded. The organization was named Leka (acronym for Lidhje, Edukatë, Kulturë and Argëtim) and helped boost ties between the students and the alumni of the college. The student organization published a monthly cultural magazine which focused on literature, folklore and history. Leka was an important magazine, receiving contributions from notable Albanologists and scholars, regardless of their religious background. Some of these scholars included Ilo Mitkë Qafëzezi, Llukë Karafili and Hamdi Bushati. Leka contributed to the educational and cultural emergence of independent Albania. In 1939, Jesuit Apostolic Delegate to Albania, Leone G. B. Nigris criticized Leka for being not faithful enough to the Jesuit doctrine, claiming that even an agnostic could write the magazine. Nonetheless the periodical continued to provide a platform for inter-religious dialogue. The magazine created several crucial literary works for Albanian culture such as studies on 17th century writer, Pjëter Budi, a critical review of the 15th century Venetian Cadastre and the first Albanian historical encyclopedia.

In 1937, an Albanina Studies Xavier Academy was founded, followed three years later by the inauguration of the Institute of Albanian Studies.

=== Communist regime ===
When the communists took power in Albania, the Jesuits were banned from the country. Jesuit institutions and churches were closed or demolished.

== Modern ==
After the communist regime collapsed, the Jesuits were able to return to Albania. In 1991, the Pontifical Albanian Seminary was reopened.

== See also ==
- Catholic Church in Albania
