= Preng Doçi =

Albanian writer, religious figure and activist (1846–1917)

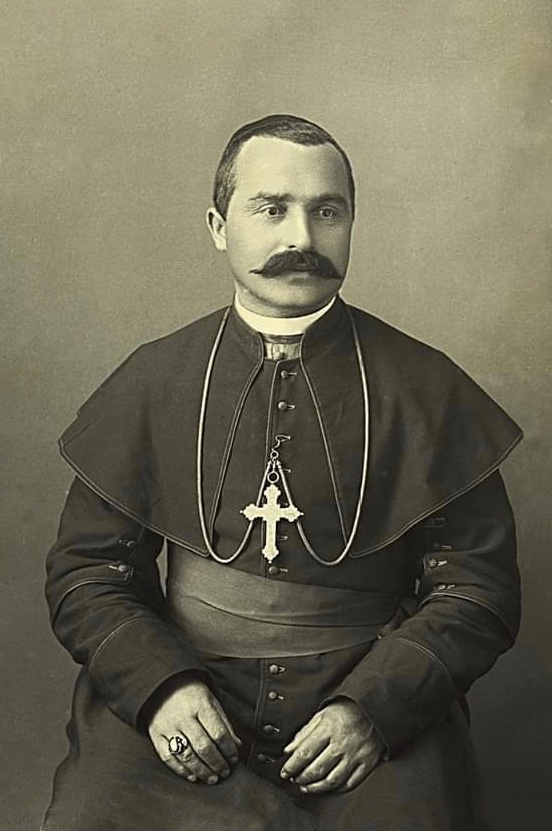
- Doçi, 1890s
- Born: Preng Doçi; 25 February 1846; Bulgër, Scutari Vilayet, Ottoman Empire
- Died: 22 February 1917 (aged 70)
- Other names: Primus Docci, also referred as Prenk, Prend Doçi
- Occupation: Catholic priest
- Known for: Society for the Unity of the Albanian Language

Preng Doçi (1846–1917), Italian: Primus Docci, was an Albanian political and religious figure and poet. He was a main contributor in the Albanian Bashkimi Alphabet.

== Life ==
Preng Doçi was born in Paraspor neighborhood of Bulgër, a village near Lezha, back then Ottoman Empire, and today's Rubik, Mirditë municipality on 25 February 1846. He finished the high school in Shkodër and in 1859 entered the recently opened Albanian Pontifical Seminary (Albanian: Kolegjia Papnore Shqyptare). Later he studied in Rome, in the Propaganda Fide College, where he met and became a close friend of Prenk Bibë Doda.

In 1871, he returned to Mirdita region in Albania, where he served as a priest in Korthpulë, Orosh, and, Kalivarja near Spaç. He was among the leaders of the Mirdita uprising against Ottoman rule in 1876–1877 under Prenk Bibë Doda. Doçi had previously traveled to Cetinje, capital of Principality of Montenegro, in order to seek financial and military assistance by the Montenegrins. He returned from Cetinje with a pledge of Montenegrin assistance and, equally important, a promise of noninterference. The rebellion was quelled by the Ottomans in March 1877. The bishop of Lezhë, Francesco Malčinski, an Austrian of Ukrainian origin suspended him from all religious activities. Doçi hid in Vuthaj, near Gusinje. Later Doçi was captured and exiled to Istanbul. With the intervention of Armenian Patriarch Stefan Azarian, he received a fake name Pére Achile and was sent to Rome with the condition of not returning to Albania.

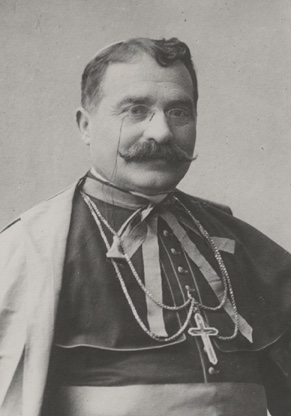
Dom Preng Doçi portrait.

After staying few months in Antivari, with the intervention of Cardinal Giovanni Simeoni of the Propaganda Fide, Doçi was sent to the west coast of the Americas, Newsfoundland, Wayne, Pennsylvania, and New Brunswick, where he worked as a missionary until 1881. To Doçi goes the honor, as far as it can be ascertained, of being the first known Albanian resident of North America. After his return to Rome, he was sent to India as secretary of the apostolic delegate to India, Cardinal Antonio Agliardi. In 1888, after years of petitioning and with the intercession of the patriarch of Constantinople, Doçi finally received permission from the Ottoman authorities to return to Albania. He arrived on 6 November 1888 and became abbot of Mirdita. In January of the following year, he was consecrated head of the Abbey nullius of St. Alexander of Orosh, Mirdita. In 1890 and later in 1894, several other regions of Lezhë and the Roman Catholic Diocese of Sapë would be joined under his Abbey's jurisdiction.

Doçi died on 22 February 1917.

== Political activity ==
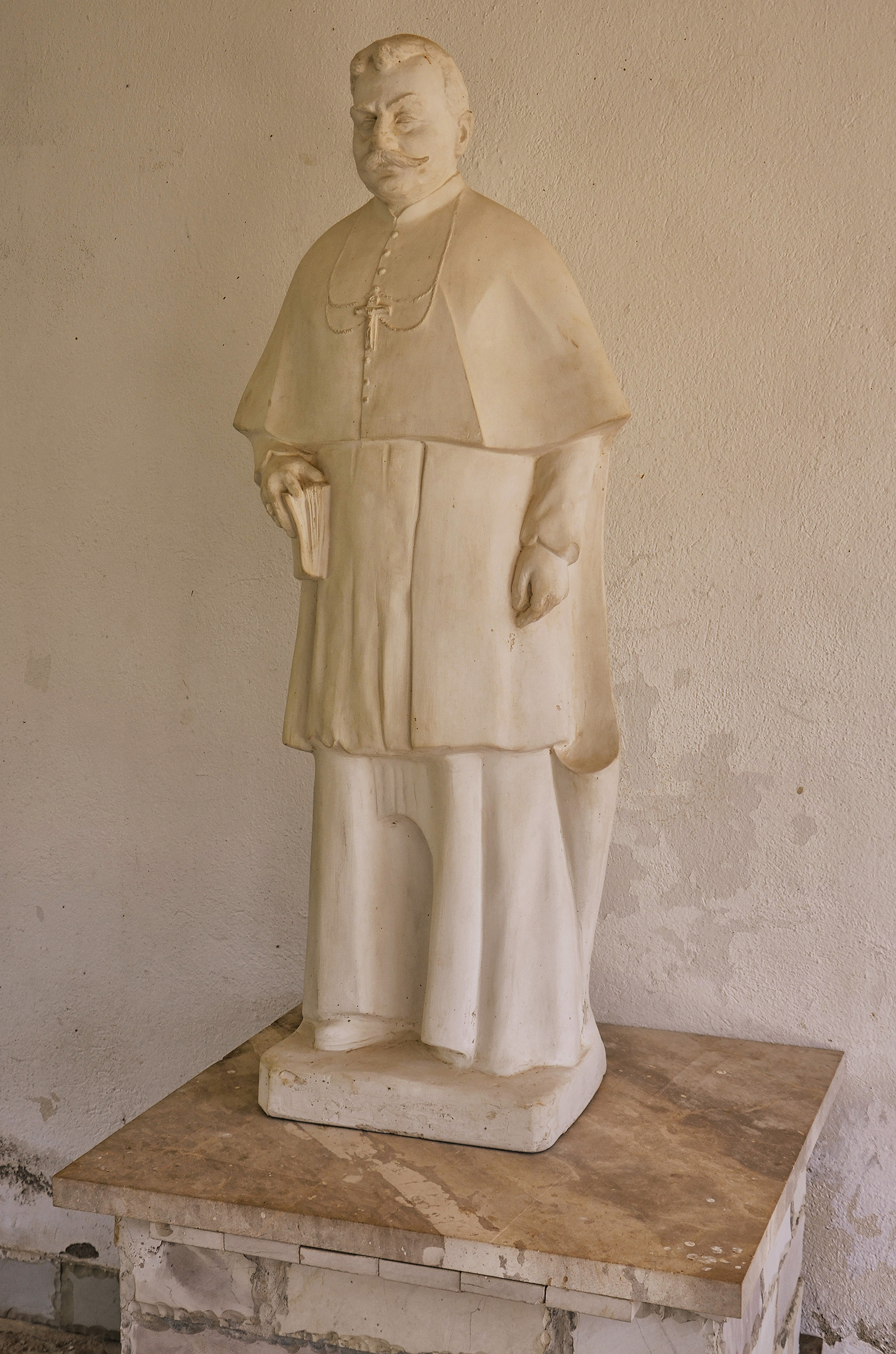
Sculpture of Preng Doçi in the portico of the Orosh Church, Mirdita

Doçi did not cease his political efforts. He advocated for close relations between Albanians and Austria-Hungary to advance Albanian geopolitical self determination however his political thinking was mainly toward Albanian Catholic interests and regional concerns. In 1897 he traveled to Vienna to propose the creation of an autonomous Catholic principality in northern Albania under Mirdita leadership and would politically dominate within a wider confederation of Albanian statelets. Austria-Hungary supported his proposal however found its implementation would be unfeasible and opposed by Muslim Albanians and the Ottoman Empire.

In 1889, he founded an Albanian school in Orosh (Grykë Orosh - Orosh Gorge), one of the earliest.

== Literary activity ==
In 1899, Doçi founded the Shoqnia e bashkimit të gjuhës shqipe (Society for the Unity of the Albanian Language) literary society, usually known as the Shoqnia Bashkimi (The Union Society), or simply Bashkimi (The Union) of Shkodra for publishing Albanian language books. Together with him there were Dom Ndoc Nikaj, Luigj Gurakuqi, Dom Gjergj Fishta, Dom Dodë Koleci, Father Pashk Bardhi, Dom Lazër Mjeda, etc. The society came out with the so-called ''Bashkimi'' alphabet, which would become one of the three alphabets considered for the standard Albanian alphabet during the Congress of Monastir in 1908. Doçi supported the use of the Bashkimi alphabet and promoted its spread in Catholic Albanian schools.

He contributed to the Fiamuri Arbërit (Flag of Albanians) newspaper of the Arbëreshë scholar Girolamo De Rada. He signed his articles as "Primo Docci", or "Një djalë prej Shqypnije" (A guy from Albania). After the foundation of Bashkimi Society, he published many works, many of them anonymously. Gjergj Fishta mentioned during his speech at the Doçi's funeral that Doçi had created 32 literary works.

== See also ==
- Ndre Mjeda
