= Maximilian Lambertz =

Austrian linguist, folklorist and Albanologist

Maximilian Lambertz (27 July 1882 – 26 August 1963) was an Austrian linguist, folklorist, and a major personality of Albanology.

== Biography ==
Maximilian Lambertz was born on 27 July 1882 in Vienna. In the years 1900 to 1905, he studied comparative linguistics and classical philology in Vienna, and subsequently received his doctorate with a dissertation on the "Greek slave name" (Vienna 1907). A government scholarship enabled him to travel to Italy and Greece. While in Greece, he overheard the conversation of some fishermen from Attica. He got curious when he was told that it was the Arvanitika dialect of the Albanian.This would change his course of work from that moment on. After his return home, he became a school teacher at Bundesgymnasium in Vienna, but in 1907 he moved to Munich, where he participated in the Thesaurus Linguae Latinae project. In 1911, he returned to Vienna and took his career as a school teacher again. His first publication in the field of Albanian studies (together with Georg Pekmezi) was a teaching and reading book of Albanian (published in Vienna, 1913), Lehr und Lesebuch des Albanischen (Manual and Reader of Albanian). In the years 1913 and 1914, he traveled for several weeks depending southern Italy, to study the Albanian dialects spoken there. In particular, he devoted himself to the less known northern dialects of Arbëresh, in the Abruzzo and Molise regions, especially the dialect of Villa Badessa (Alb: Badhesa). On this trip, his first collection of photographs came out.

From May to July 1916, Max Lambertz visited as part of an expedition of the Balkan Commission of the Austrian Academy of Sciences for the first time North and Central Albania to scientifically deal with the Albanian language and folklore. On this trip he visited Gruda, Shkodër, Lezhë, Krujë, Tirana, Durrës, the Kir valley, Shoshi, Shala, the valleys of the Drin and Valbonë and especially Mirdita where he devoted himself to the local dialect and folklore material collected. On this trip some unique photographs were taken. In December 1916, he returned to Albania, this time with the Austro-Hungarian troops which in the events of World War I had occupied northern and central Albania. He was entrusted with the management of the Albanian education system and was the first foreigner member of the Albanian Literary Commission, which was used by the Austro-Hungarian authorities to create a normalized for the school system default language. In Shkodra, he collaborated with Gjergj Fishta, editor of the newspaper Posta e Shypnisë (The Albanian Post) during 1916–1918, in which he published several posts. The collected folkloric material was published in Sarajevo, 1917, as Volkspoesie der Albaner: eine einführende Studie (Folk poetry of the Albanians: an introductory study).

After the war, Lambertz returned to Austria, where he taught until 1934. He also wrote books and articles on various aspects of Albanian culture, especially for the folklore. After 1934 after Engelbert Dollfuss took over, he retired as a longtime member of the Austrian Social Democratic Party, enrolled at the age of fifty-three years back at the university, and studied this time Protestant theology, but his dissertation was rejected for racial reasons, since his mother came from a Jewish family. In 1939, Lambertz moved to Munich, where he worked again until 1942 at the Thesaurus Linguae Latinae. In 1943, he went to Leipzig, where he taught French and Italian at the Leipzig School for Foreign Languages.

In June 1945, after had joined the Communist Party, he became director of the Leipzig "Fremdsprachenschule" (College of Foreign Languages), in 1946, Professor of Comparative Linguistics, and until 1949 the dean of the new Faculty of Education at the Karl Marx University. Until his retirement in 1957, he was also director of the "Indo-European Institute".

Lambertz visited Albania in June 1954, and in 1957. Even after the breakdown of close political relations between Albania and the Warsaw Pact, he refused to completely abandon its links with the country. He participated furthermore at receptions of the Albanian Embassy in East Berlin.

As a professor of comparative linguistics at the University of Leipzig, Lambertz lived with his wife Josepha in a villa in nearby Markkleeberg. He died there on 26 August 1963 and was buried at the Döbling Cemetery in Vienna.

== Main works ==
- Lehr und Lesebuch des Albanischen (Manual and Reader of Albanian), 1913.
- "Weitere Werke unter anderem, und andere Die hypothet. Periode im Albanesischen" ("Other works, among other things, and other hypothesis. Period in Albanian"), in Indogerman. Forschungen, vol. 34, 1914, p. 45–208.
- Volkspoesie der Albaner: eine einführende Studie (Folk poetry of the Albanians: an introductory study), 1917.
- Nachrr. üb. d. Literar. Komm. (Afterwards the Literary Commission), 1918.
- Die Regelung d. alban. Rechtschreibung (The scheme of the Albanian spelling), 1918.
- "Vom Goldenen Horn, Griech. Märchen aus d MA" ("From the Golden Horn, Greek tales of the MA"), in Märchen aus allen Ländern, vol. 9, 1922.
- "Zwischen Drin u. Vojussa, Alban. Märchen" ("Between Drin and Vjosa, Albanian fairy tale"), in Märchen aus allen Ländern, vol. 10, 1922.
- Alban. Märchen u. a. Texte d. alban. Folklore (Albanian fairy tales and texts of the Albanian folklore), 1922.
- Albanien erzählt, Ein Einblick in d. alban. Literature (Albanian recount, and insight into the Albanian literature), 1956.
- Gjergi Fishta u. d. alban. Heldenepos Lahuta e Malcis (Gjergj Fishta and the Albanian epic Lahuta e Malcis), 1949.
- Die geflügelte Schwester u. d. Dunklen d. Erde, Alban. Volksmärchen (Winged sister and the dark earth, Albanian folk tales), 1952.
- Am Rande d. Herdes, Winterabende in d. alban. Kulla (On the edge of the hearth, winter evenings in the Albanian kulla), 1949.
- "Die Volksepik d. Albaner" ("The folk epic of the Albanians"), in Wiss. Zs. d. Karl-Marx-Univ. Leipzig, vol. 3–4, 1954, pages 55, 243–289; 1955, pages 440–473.
- Lehrgang des Albanischen. 3 vols., vol. 1: Albanisch-deutsches Wörterbuch; vol. 2: Albanische Chrestomathie; vol. 3: Grammatik der albanischen Sprache. Berlin: Deutscher Verlag der Wissenschaften 1954; Berlin 1955; Halle/Saale 1959.
