= Ndoc Nikaj =

Albanian priest, writer, and historian

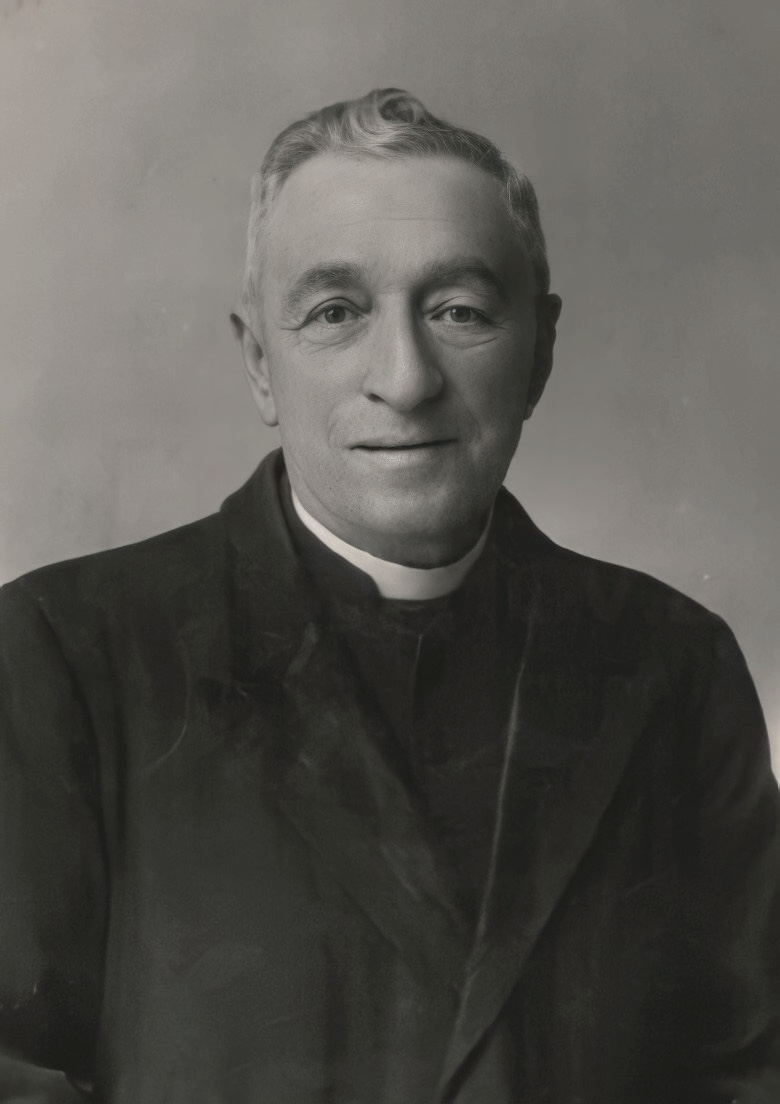
- Nikaj in the 1920s
- Born: Ndoc Nikaj; 15 June 1864; Shkodër, Ottoman Empire
- Died: 16 January 1951 (aged 86); Shkodër prison
- Other names: N.D.N; Nagdo Monici
- Occupation: Catholic priest
- Known for: Shoqnia Bashkimi; Nikaj printing house

Ndoc Nikaj (15 June 1864 – 16 January 1951) was an Albanian priest, writer, and historian. He was the first Albanian novelist to write and publish an original novel in the Albanian language, Shkodra e rrethueme (English: Shkoder under siege) of 1905.

== Biography ==
Born in Shkodër on 15 June 1864, Nikaj was educated in the Albanian Pontifical Seminary and ordained as a priest in 1888. Along with Preng Doçi he was the creator of the Lidhja e Mshehët (English: The Secret League), which aimed at overthrowing the Ottoman Empire and the creation of an independent Albania. Such league inspired the Albanian Revolt of 1910. Nikaj was one of the founders of the literary society Society for the Unity of the Albanian Language, mostly known in Albanian as Shoqnia Bashkimi.

Nikaj established in 1909 his own printing press, "Shtypshkronja Nikaj" (English: Nikaj Press) and also founded two newspapers: Koha (English: The Time) in 1910 and Besa Shqyptare (English: The Albanian Pledge) in 1913. Besa Shqyptare lasted until 1921. The cultural and literary magazine Hylli i Dritës was printed there.

Nikaj is remembered for the two history collections of 1902, "History of Albania" and "History of Turkey" which pushed toward the consolidation of the Catholic identity between Albanians, focusing on Scanderbeg and his wars against the Ottomans. His work was criticized as inexact and tendentious by the Austrian diplomat and historian Theodore Ippen.

Nikaj was arrested in 1921 for unknown reasons, and little is known about him until the end of World War II. He was arrested by the communists in 1946 and died in prison in 1951.

== Nonliterary publications ==
Nikaj's educational, religious and other publications are the following:

1. Vakinat e sceites kisc (English: History of the holy church) (Rome 1888)
2. Bleta nner lule t'Parrizit (English: The Bee amongst the flowers) (Shkodër 1899)
3. Historia e Shcypniis (English: History of Albania) (Brussels 1902)
4. Historia e Turkiis (English: History of Turkey) (London 1902)

== Literary publications ==
Nikaj wrote prose most of which is now rare to be found:

1. Marzia e ksctenimi n'filles t'vet (English: Marzia and the origins of Christianity) (Shkodër 1892)
2. Fejesa n'djep a se Ulqimni i marrun (English: Marriage in the cradle or Ulcinj captured)
3. Shkodra e rrethueme (English: Shkodra under siege) (Shkodër 1905)
4. Bukurosha (English: The Beautiful Maiden) (Shkodër 1918)
5. Lulet ne Thes (English: The Flowers in a bag) (Shkodër 1920)
6. Burbuqja (English: The Little girl) (Shkodër 1920)
7. Motra per vllan (English: The Sister for her brother) (Shkodër 1921)
