= August Ritter von Kral =

Austrian diplomat

August Ritter von Kral (20 June 1869 in Braunau, Bohemia – 12 June 1953 in Vienna, Austria) was an Austrian diplomat.

== Biography ==
August Ritter von Kral

Personal details
- Born: 20 June 1869 Braunau, Bohemia
- Died: 12 June 1953 (aged 83) Vienna, Austria
- Occupation: Diplomat
- Profession: Diplomat

August Kral entered the diplomatic service of Austria-Hungary in 1894 and held various posts in embassies in the Ottoman Empire and Persia. By 1914 he was consul in Scutari (today's Northern Albania) and commissary at the International Commission of Control for Albania. During the Bosnian annexation crisis he was given the power to enforce the Austrian interests against Serbia and Montenegro in Albania. After the conquest of Montenegro and northern Albania in February 1916 by the Austro-Hungarian Army, he was established in the occupied northern two-thirds of Albania as administrator, assisted by a civilian board of directors. Based on his initiative, Albanian poet Gjergj Fishta founded together with Albanian patriot Luigj Gurakuqi the Albanian Literary Commission for a unified Albanian orthography.

After the First World War, Kral served as consul General in Hamburg (1919–1921), then ambassador in Sofia, Bulgaria. From April 1924 until his retirement in April 1932, he coined as the first ambassador of the Republic of Austria in Ankara, Turkey. In his book Kamâl Atatürk's Land: the Evolution of Modern Turkey (German: Das Land Kamâl Atatürks: der Werdegang der modernen Türkei) he formed a lasting perception of the new Turkey of Atatürk in German space.
