= Society for the Unity of the Albanian Language =

Albanian literary society

- Shoqnia e Bashkimit të Gjuhës Shqipe
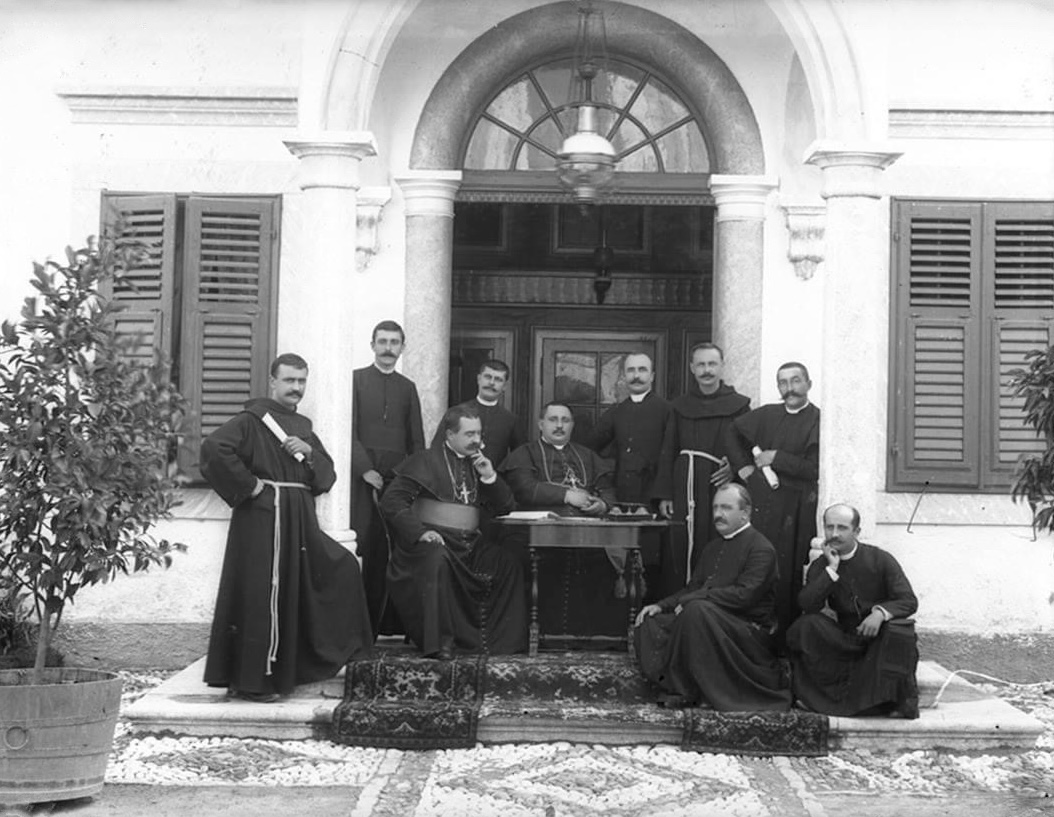
- Formation: January 4, 1899; 127 years ago
- Founder: Preng Doçi
- Headquarters: Shkodër, Ottoman Albania
- Official language: Albanian
- Key people: Lazër Mjeda; Ndoc Nikaj; Gjergj Fishta; Ndre Mjeda

Shoqnia e Bashkimit të Gjuhës Shqipe (Society for the Unity of the Albanian Language), usually known as the Shoqnia Bashkimi ( The Union Society) , or simply Bashkimi i Shkodrës (The Union of Shkodra) was a literary society founded in Shkodra, Ottoman Empire (today's Albania) in 1899. The Bashkimi society was the union of three previously independent societies: Shpresa, Drita and Dituria. Drita, a journal was the official publication of the Bashkimi Society.

Its founder and leader was Dom Preng Doçi, Abbot of Mirdita. Other Catholic clerics who joined were Jak Serreqi, Lazër Mjeda, Ndoc Nikaj, Gjergj Fishta, Ndre Mjeda, Pashk Bardhi, Mark Shllaku, Dodë Koleci. The only non-cleric, Albanian politician Luigj Gurakuqi, joined later.

Since Albanian-language groups were forbidden by the Ottoman authorities, it opened as a "religious society". Its starting objectives were:

1. Creation of an Albanian language dictionary;
2. Mandatory correspondence of its members with foreign press organs;
3. Establishment of a weekly or monthly publication of the society; and
4. Participation in the attempt to create a unified Albanian alphabet.

One of its main contributions was the so-called Bashkimi alphabet, a latin script-based alphabet without diacritic letters.

Due to differences of opinion on the future alphabet, brothers Lazër and Ndre Mjeda left the group to initiate their own society, called Agimi ("The dawn"), in 1901. The Bashkimi alphabet was discussed and approved in a conference of Catholic bishops held in Shkodra in 1902, and was presented as a main candidate during the sessions of the Congress of Monastir, 1908, where the Albanian alphabet was unified. The Bashkimi alphabet was rejected in favor of the Istanbul alphabet (Albanian: Alfabeti i Stambollit) by majority vote. However, due to lack of unanimity, the Congress was unable to choose only one alphabet and opted for a compromise solution of using both the Istanbul and Bashkimi alphabets with some changes to reduce the differences between them. Usage of the alphabet of Istanbul declined rapidly and it became extinct over the following years and Albania declared its independence.

Within a few years from its creation, the society published many works, the most important of which was the New Albanian Dictionary (Albanian: Fjaluer i Ri i Shqypes) of 1908. The dictionary included 13,482 words. It remained the most detailed Albanian dictionary until 1954, when the Albanian Institute of Science (a precursor of the Academy of Sciences of Albania) came out with its first standard dictionary, the "Dictionary of the Science Institute" (Fjalori i Institutit të Shkencave).

== Revolutionary activities ==
The Bashkimi society was not a revolutionary committee, yet it did have connections with newly formed Albanian bands operating in Albania and Macedonia. Due to the efforts of Nikolla Naço, the director of Drita, there were also relations by the Bashkimi society with an Aromanian (Kutzo Vlach) organisation that was fighting in Macedonia against the Greeks.

In 1902 a Congress of Ottoman Opposition of Ottoman dissidents was held in Paris. As the Bashkimi Society headquarters were in Bucharest, the Young Turks (CUP) requested Ibrahim Temo's assistance in inviting the organisation to the congress and through a telegram wanted to know from him in a quick response if they would participate. No response exists and overall Albanians from the organisation did not participate the CUP congress.

The Young Turks contacted moderate factions of organisations that wanted Albanian cultural rights recognised by the Ottomans. Negotiations were undertaken by the CUP with a leader based in Leskovik of the Bashkimi Society and convinced him that Albanian support was needed for the CUP. The leader agreed to inform the headquarters at Bucharest and promised to defend an alliance of the CUP, Bashkimi Society, and additional Albanians. During the Young Turk revolution (1908), the CUP in its aims of securing Albanian support for its cause managed to reach an understanding with the Bucharest-based Bashkimi Society. In the course of the revolution a pro-government gathering held at Firzovik (modern Ferizaj) turned into a meeting calling for constitutional restoration and Ottoman authorities felt dismayed when they found out that some Albanians in the crowd were reading the Drita journal of the Bashkimi Society.

== See also ==
- Society for the Publication of Albanian Letters
