= Abetare =

Children's textbook written in Albanian

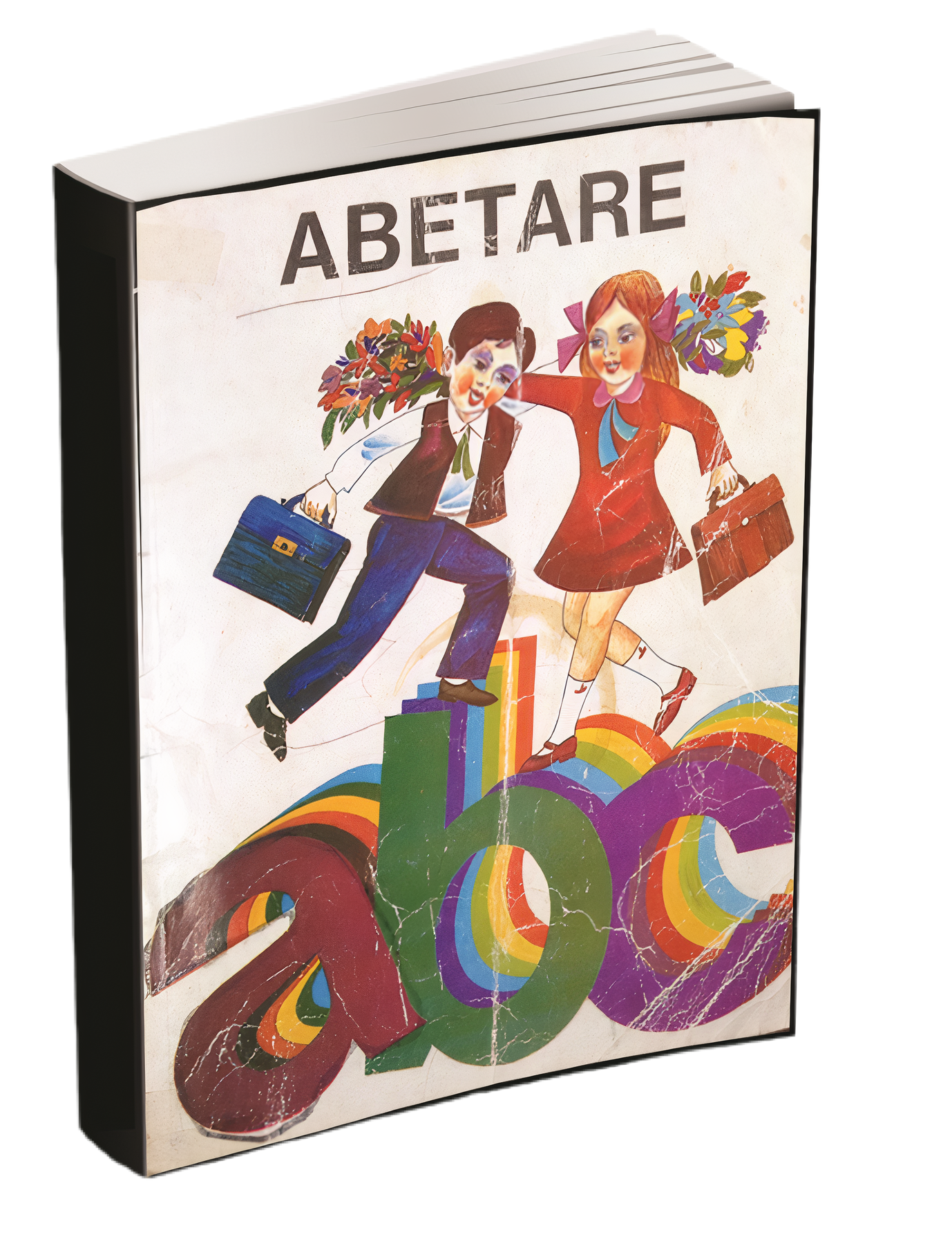
- Author: Over 150 authors
- Language: Albanian
- Genre: Textbook
- Publication date: 1844–present
- Publication place: Albania; Kosovo; North Macedonia; Montenegro: Ulcinj Municipality; Tuzi Municipality
- Pages: 120

The Abetare (Albanian primer) is an elementary textbook used to teach reading and writing in the Albanian language. Due to the political and cultural circumstances created by foreign occupation, the Abetare carried an important role in the development of Albanian education and national consciousness. Through the process of learning to read and write, generations of young Albanians were introduced to the history, language and cultural heritage of their homeland.

== History ==
The earliest known Abetare was compiled by Naum Veqilharxhi and published in 1844 under the title "Fort i shkurtër e i përdorshëm Ëvetar shqip" ("A Very Short and Practical Albanian Primer"). It included a programmatic preface that outlined educational and cultural aims associated with the Albanian National Awakening. The work was republished in 1845 as "Fare i ri Ëvetar shqip për djem nismëtarë", expanding to 50 pages and supplemented with additional reading materials.

A major contribution to early Albanian primers was made by Kostandin Kristoforidhi, who in 1867 published primers in both the Gheg and Tosk dialects. These works were later reprinted and widely used for teaching Albanian during his travels throughout the Albanian-speaking Balkans.

In the late 19th century, the production of Albanian-language primers intensified alongside the broader national movement. During the period of the League of Prizren, the preparation of primers and other educational texts became closely linked to initiatives aimed at promoting Albanian language and schooling.

In this context, a new primer titled "Alfabetarja e gjuhës shqip" was published in Istanbul, in 1879 by Jani Vreto, Sami Frashëri, Pashko Vasa and Koto Hoxhi. This publication represented a significant step in the development of Albanian school textbooks and contributed to the gradual formation of a national educational framework.

Primers of this period typically combined basic language instruction with reading passages, poetry and introductory material on nature and Albanian history, reflecting advances in both content and pedagogical structure.

Throughout the 19th century, primers intended for young learners were published in both major Albanian dialects, often incorporating historical and literary texts. Authors of this period included Daut Boriçi and Anastas Kullurioti.

In the years preceding Albania's independence, the number of primers increased. Luigj Gurakuqi published "Abetari për Msoitore Filltare t’Shqypniis" in Naples, in 1905, followed by "Abetar i vogël shcyp" in Bucharest, in 1906. Parashqevi Qiriazi published a primer in Manastir for use in primary schools, in 1909.

Additional primers appeared in Paris in 1911, the works of Nikolla Lako and Simon Shuteriqi. Later contributions came from prominent intellectuals, more notably Aleksandër Xhuvani, Thoma Papapano, Mati Logoreci, Jani Minga, Lazër Lumezi and others.

Following the liberation of the country after World War II, the preparation of primers became more systematized within the framework of the national education system and increasingly grounded in academic and linguistic research. The 1947 primer was based on the word method, while the revised 1949 edition by Kolë Xhumari and later reprints, adopted the analytic–synthetic method.

Specialized primers were also published for special needs groups, including the deaf and visually impaired.

== Selected primers ==
- "Ëvetarët e Parë Shqip" by Naum Veqilharxhi (1844–45)
- "Tri Abetarët e Gjuhës Shqipe" by Kostandin Kristoforidhi (1867–72)
- "Mësoni të shkruani Gjuhën Shqipe" by Daut Boriçi (1869)
- "Pellazgjika Shqip" by Vasil Dhimitër Ruso (1877)
- "Abetare e Gjuhës Shqipe" by Sami Frashëri (1879)
- "Abetarea Shqip" by Jovan Risto Terova (1887)
- "Tri Abetaret" by Parashqevi Qiriazi (1909)
- "Abetareja Shqip rrieshtuarë në gjuhë të përbashkëme" by Simon Shuteriqi (1911)
- "Abetaret Xhuvani-Pogoni" by Aleksandër Xhuvani and Pertef Pogoni (1922–39)
- "Abetare" by Kolë Xhumari (1949–1998)
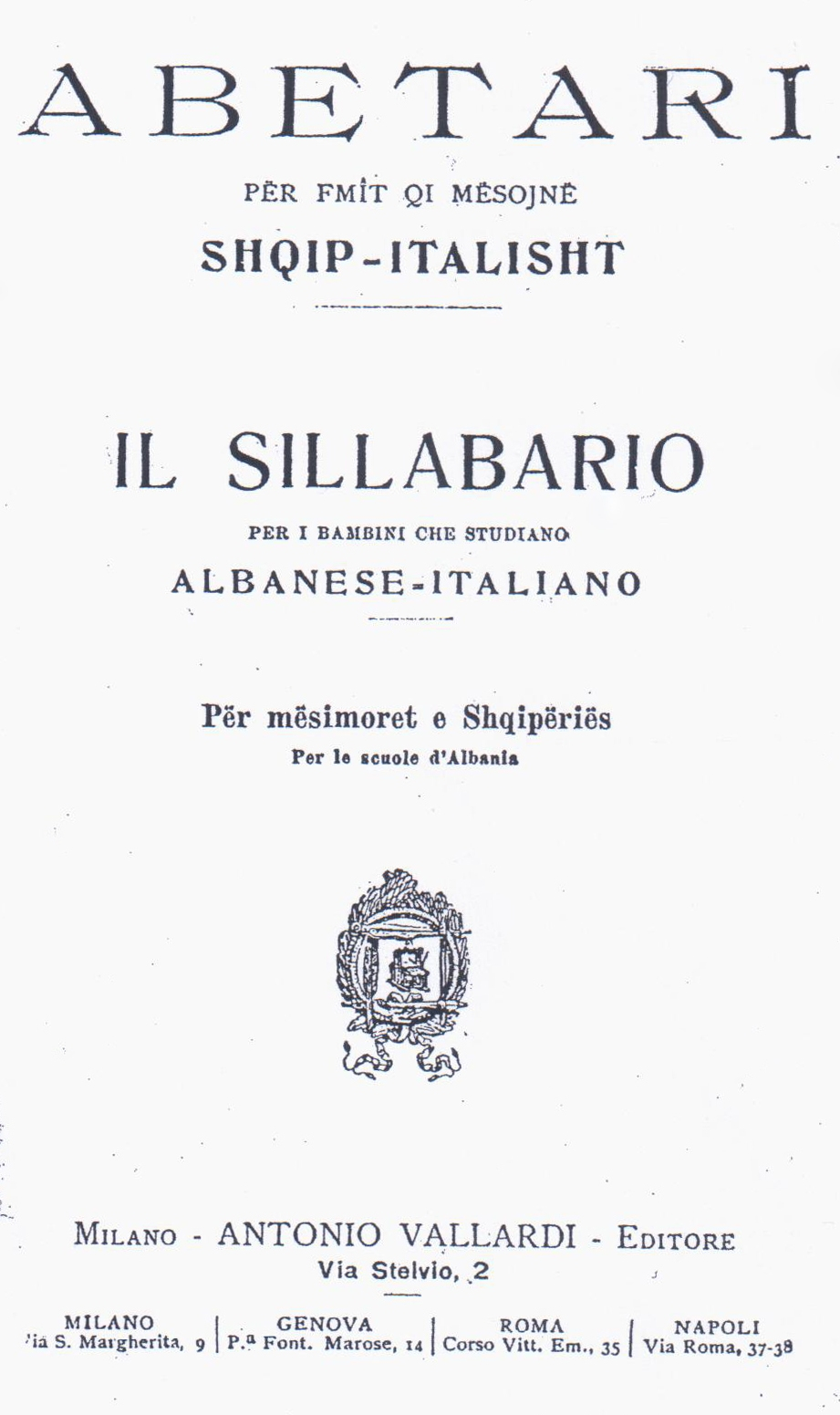
Abetari Shqip–Italisht

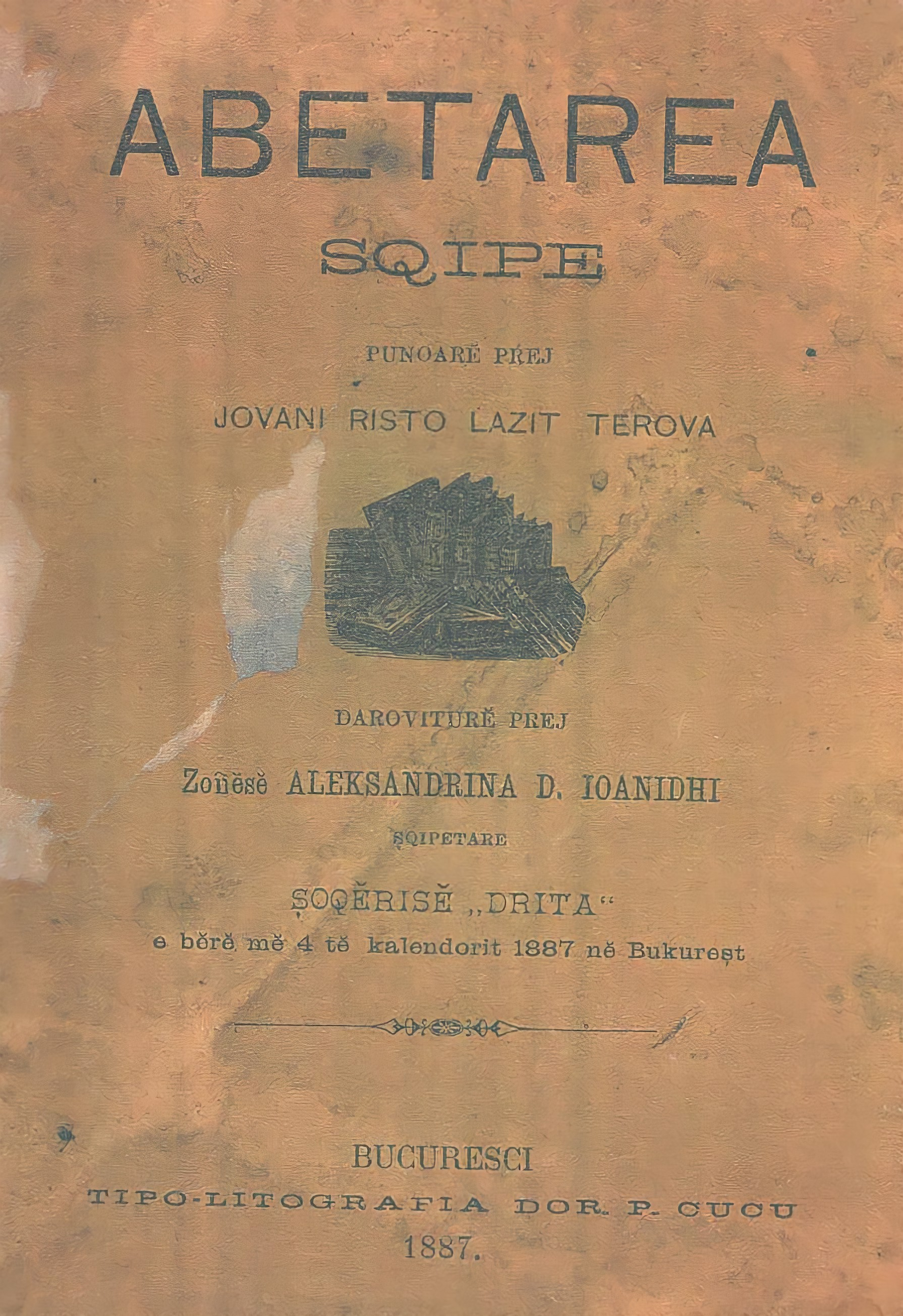
Abetare by Jovan Risto Terova

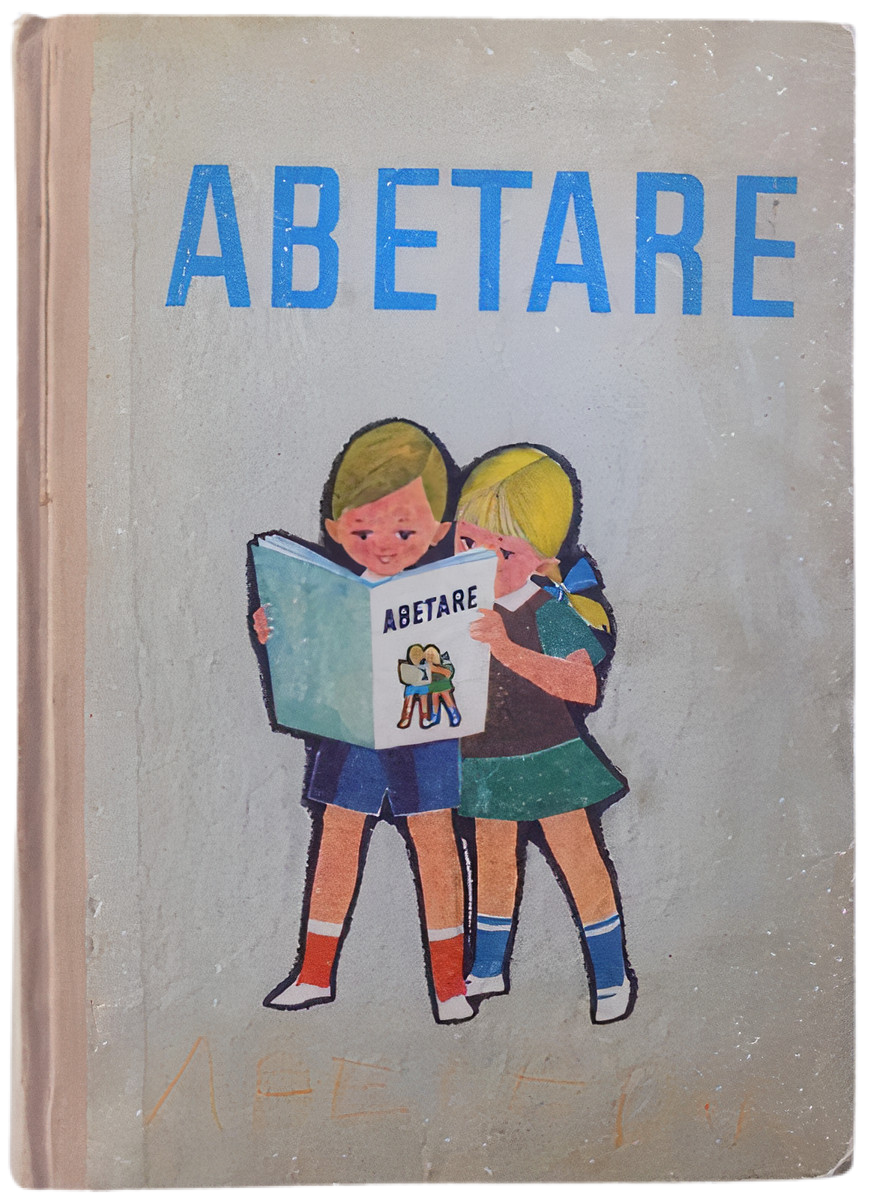
Abetare by Kolë Xhumari

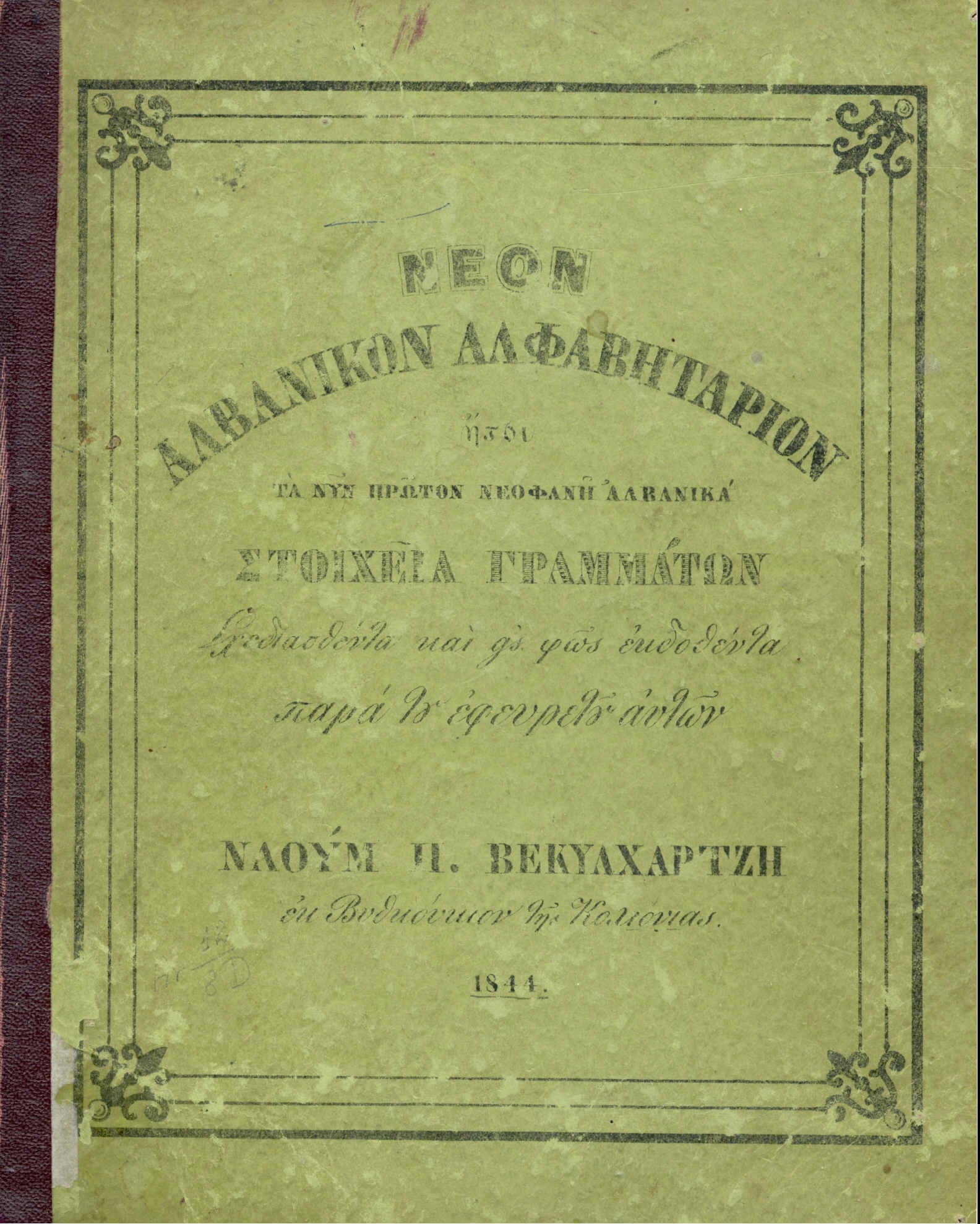
Abetare by Naum Veqilharxhi

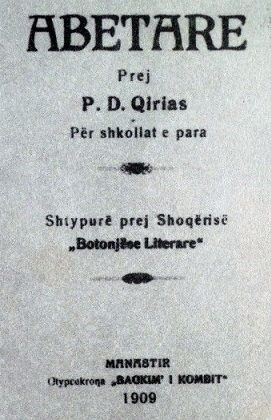
Abetare by Parashqevi Qiriazi

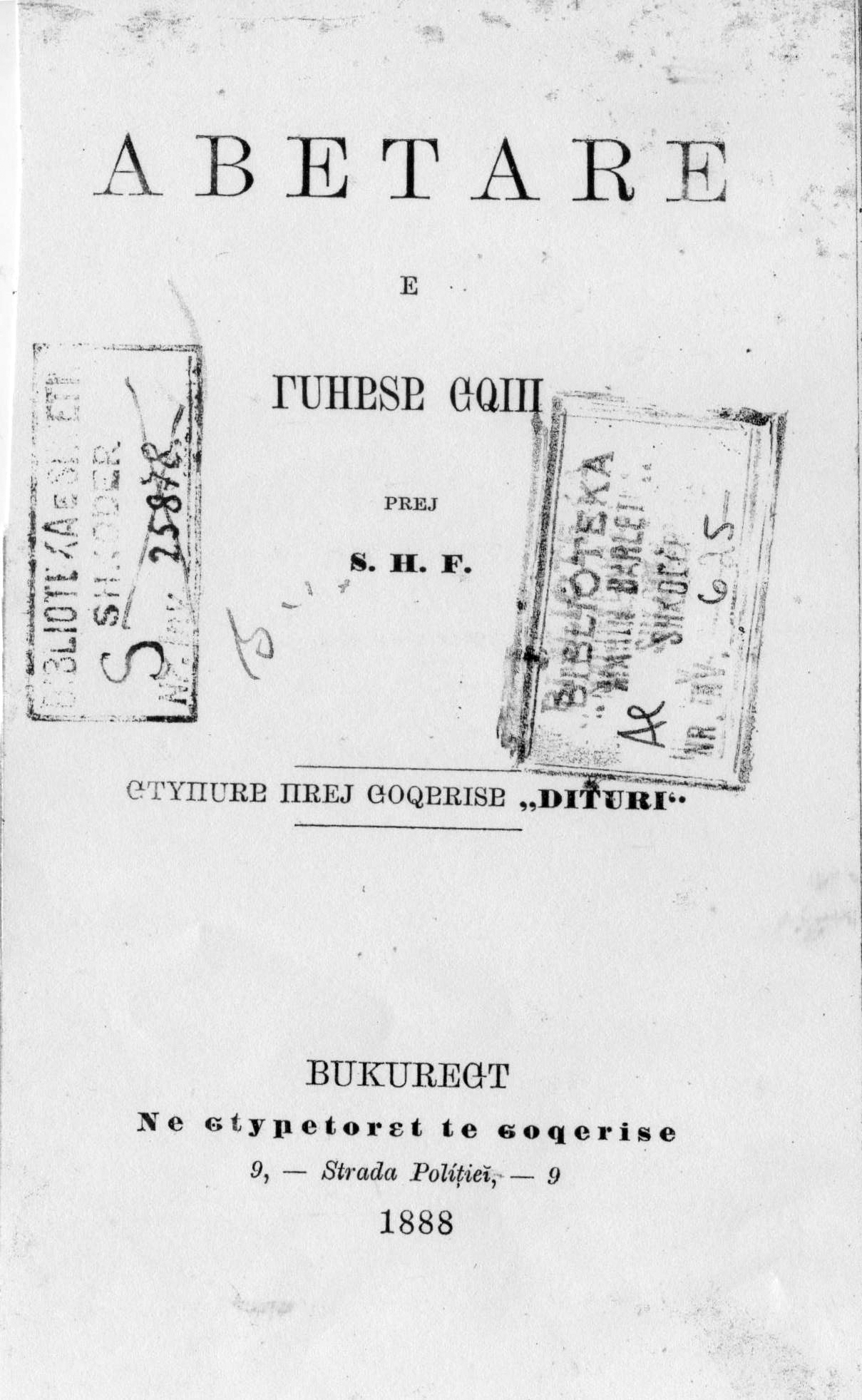
Abetare by Sami Frashëri

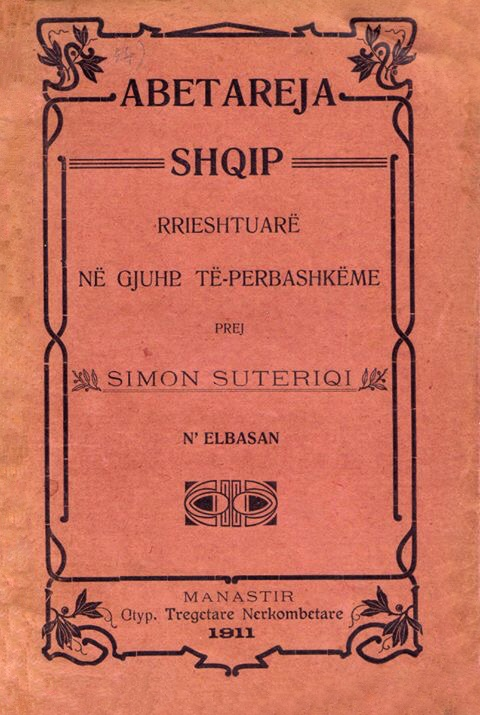
Abetare by Simon Shuteriqi

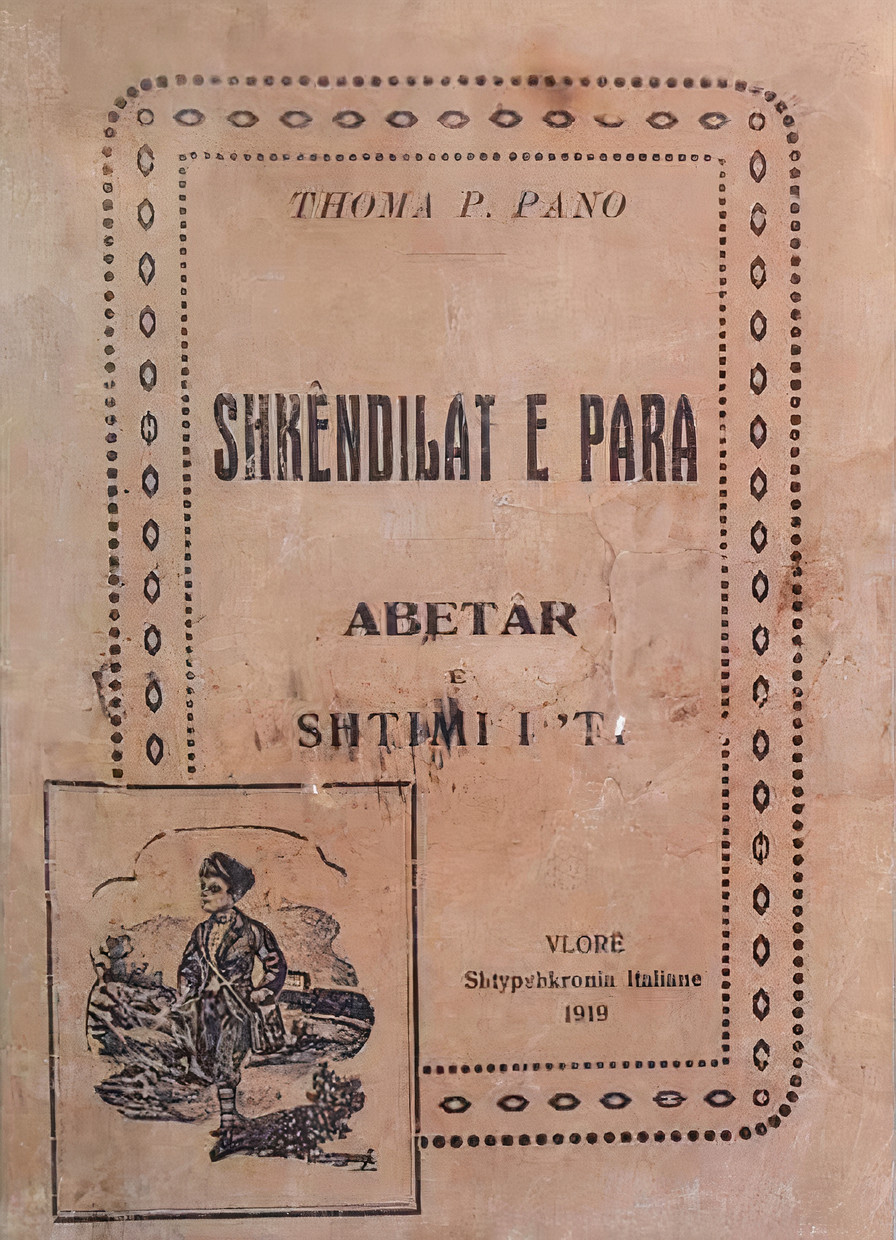
Abetare by Thoma Papapano
