= Albanian Literary Commission =

- Komisija Letrare Shqipe
- Formation: September 1, 1916; 109 years ago
- Founder: August Ritter von Kral
- Purpose: Patriotic, Intellectual
- Headquarters: Shkodër, Principality of Albania
- Official language: Albanian
- Key people: Gjergj Fishta; Luigj Gurakuqi; Gjergj Pekmezi; Hil Mosi; Mati Logoreci; Ndre Mjeda; Aleksandër Xhuvani

The Albanian Literary Commission (Albanian: Komisija Letrare Shqipe), also known as the Literary Commission of Shkodër, was a scholarly committee established in Shkodër, north Albania in 1916. It gathered major personalities of Albanian literature and writing of the time, and was formed with the aim of defining a fixed literary standard and orthographic rules for the Albanian language which were lacking at the time, in order to encourage the publication of schooltexts.

== History ==
The commission started officially on 1 September 1916 with the initiative of the Austrian diplomat August Ritter von Kral. Some of the notable members were Gjergj Fishta, Luigj Gurakuqi, Hil Mosi, Aleksandër Xhuvani, Maximilian Lambertz, Gjergj Pekmezi, Ndre Mjeda, Sotir Peci, and Mati Logoreci. The members agreed on the necessity of having an orthography standard "as phonetic as possible" and a unified literary language which would preserve what the Albanian dialects had in common and leave out any stigmatized regional forms.

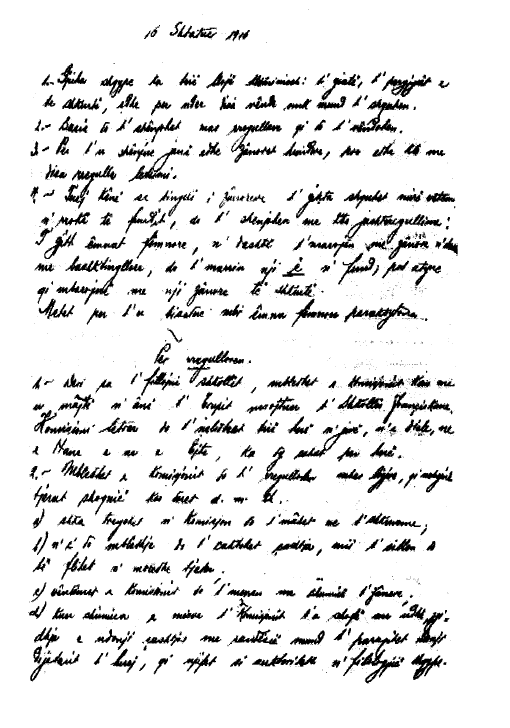
Facsimile of one of the process-verbals of the commission. Session held on 16 September 1916 (date shows on top of the document)

Fishta played a leading role in the commission. He tried hard to push for the dialect of Shkodër to form the base of the Albanian standard, in respect to the cultural contribution that writers and literature in the dialect had given to Albanian culture at that time, "much as Dante's language had served for literary Italian. Regardless of Fishta's influence and the fact that other founding members were from Shkodër as well, he did not succeed. Under the influence of Aleksander Xhuvani who proclaimed that "the unity of the language is the unity of the nation" (Albanian: Njisia e gjuhes asht njisia e kombit.), the commission accepted the dialect of Elbasan to be used as the basis for standard Albanian. While being a Gheg dialect, it is a southern one and closest possible to the Tosk dialect. The standard was adopted by the Educational Congress of Lushnje in 1920.

The commission published a reader for middle schools in 1920. However, since there no official grammar or dictionary were published in the new language standard, it did not succeed. Moreover, most of the works and translations created during the Albanian National Awakening (1870–1912) and the early 20th century were written in Tosk dialect.

== Afterwards ==
The efforts for language standardisation would continue after World War II. A conference was held in Pristina in 1968, the Linguistic Conference of Pristina (Albanian: Konsulta gjuhësore e Prishtinës), where the literary standard used so far in Albania and based on the Tosk dialect was adopted by ethnic Albanians of Yugoslavia at the expense of the Gheg dialect. The Tosk-based current standard would be established by the Albanian Orthography Congress of 1972.

== See also ==
- Congress of Manastir
