= Albanian Pontifical Seminary =

Albanian Pontifical Seminary (Albanian: Kolegjia Papnore Shqyptare) is a Jesuit seminary located in Shkoder, Albania.

It opened first in 1859 in Shkoder, then the center of Scutari Vilayet of Ottoman Empire. In 1870, the seminary brought to life its own printing press called "Press of the Immaculate Virgin" (Albanian: Shtypshkroja e Zojes s'Paperlyeme). The press printed in 1876 its own book, Christian Doctrine (Albanian: Dotrina e kerscten) of Engjell Radoja (1820-1880), which would be followed by many others.

With the rise of Communism in Albania, the Jesuits would be targets of persecution. The college's rector Father Daniel Dajani would be arrested together with Father Gjon Fausti (vice-provincial of the Jesuits) on December 31, 1945. They were executed on 4 March 1946. In April 1946, the authorities closed down all Jesuit institutions and the Jesuit Order was outlawed. With the reestablishment of diplomatic relations between Albania and the Holy See in 1991, the college reopened in October of the same year.

== Alumni ==
- Ndoc Nikaj, writer and historian
- Preng Doçi, anti-Ottoman activist and poet
- Lazër Shantoja, Saint, poet, and translator

== See also ==
- Jesuits in Albania
- Religion in Albania
- Roman Catholicism in Albania
- List of Jesuit sites
