= Kolë Xhumari =

Albanian academic (1912–2006)

Kolë Xhumari (1 May 1912 – 1 May 2006) was an Albanian academic from Kavajë. He is best known as the principal author of the modern version of the children's book Abetare which has been in use since 1946. He was born to Pal Xhumari and Athina Bidoshi.
