= Gjergj Pekmezi =

Albanian linguist

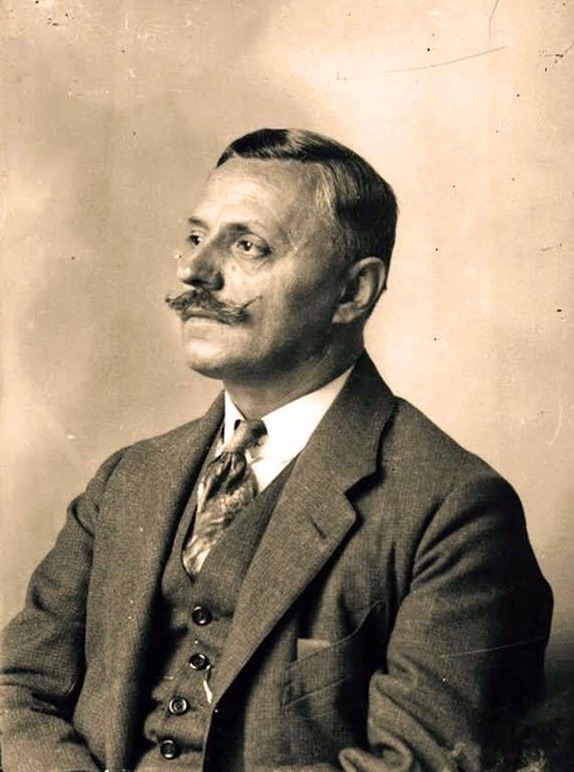
- Gjergj Pekmezi portrait
- Born: 23 April 1872; Tushemisht, Vilayet of Monastir, Ottoman Empire (modern day Albania)
- Died: 24 February 1938 (aged 65); Vienna, Austria
- Other name: Georg Pekmezi
- Occupations: Philologist, diplomat
- Known for: Albanian Literary Commission
- Family: Pekmezi

Gjergj Pekmezi (23 April 1872 – 24 February 1938) was an Albanian linguist, philosopher, folklorist and diplomat. In 1916, he became a member of the Literary Commission of Shkodër, which established the first standard form of the Albanian language.

== Early life ==
Pekmezi was born in Tushemisht, Pogradec, Manastir Vilayet, Ottoman Empire (modern day Albania). He began his initial studies in Ohrid and Monastir, moving on to Belgrade from 1890 to 1894. He later graduated from the University of Vienna in philosophy and philology in 1898. After his graduation, Pekmezi returned to Albania.

== Career ==
In 1903, Pekmezi was elected to direct the Albanian language cathedra at the Oriental University of Vienna. He founded the cultural-patriotic society Dija (Knowledge) in 1904 with Hile Mosi, Kolë Rrota and other Albanian intellectuals. In the late Ottoman period, Austria-Hungary subsidized two of Pekmezi's works: Albanesische Bibliographie and Albanianische Grammatik.

During the autumn of 1913, Pekmezi worked for the border commission in southern Albania and in March 1914 was appointed dragoman (interpreter/secretary) at the new Austro–Hungarian mission in Durrës. In 1916, he was a leading member of the Albanian Literary Commission in Shkodër under the auspices of Austro–Hungary. In April 1917 he accompanied and facilitated the delegation of Albanian chieftains and leaders who visited Vienna and met with the Imperial authorities with an invitation by Ignaz Freiherr Trollmann.

From 1920 to 1924 and 1926 to 1928, he served as Albanian consul in Austria. In 1924 he published a new edition of Thimi Mitko's Bleta Shqipëtare using the modern Albanian alphabet. Pekmezi's work became at that time the best-known edition of Bleta Shqipëtare.

From 1928 until his death, he taught Albanian at the University of Vienna. The Albanology branch of the University of Vienna bears his name.

A high school located in Rruga Driloni, Pogradec, Albania is named Gjergj Pekmezi High School.

== Work ==
Gjergj Pekmezi was the author of:

- Vorläufiger Bericht über das Studium des albanesischen Dialekts von Elbasan (Preliminary Report on the Study of the Albanian Dialect of Elbasan), Vienna, 1901
- Grammatik der albanesischen Sprache (Grammar of the Albanian Language), Vienna, 1908
- Bleta shqypëtare e Thimi Mitkos (The Albanian Bee of Thimi Mitko), Vienna, 1924
- Bibliographija shqype/Albanesische Bibliographie (Albanian Bibliography), as coauthor, Vienna, 1909
- Sprachführer zur schnellen Erlernung der albanischen Sprache (Manual for Learning the Albanian Language Quickly), Vienna, 1913
- Lehr und Lesebuch des Albanischen (Manual and Reader of Albanian), as coauthor with Maximilian Lambertz, Vienna, 1913

== Sources ==
=== References ===
- Cornis-Pope, Marcel; Neubauer, John (2007-07-15). History of the literary cultures of East-Central Europe: junctures and disjunctures in the 19th and 20th centuries. John Benjamin's Publishing Company. ISBN 978-90-272-3455-1.
- Elsie, Robert (2010). Historical Dictionary of Albania. Historical Dictionaries of Europe. Vol. 75 (2 ed.). Scarecrow Press. ISBN 978-0810861886.
