= Mjeda family =

Albanian noble family

- Current region: Northern Albania and Kosovo
- Origin: Mjedë
- Members: Ndre Mjeda; Lazër Mjeda; Kol Mjeda; Lukë Simon Mjeda; Luigj Pashko Mjeda; Jak Mjeda
- Connected families: Kryeziu family Bushati family

The Mjeda family (Italian: Miedia), is a noble Albanian family which played a prominent role in the history of Albania and Kosovo in the 19th and early 20th century.

== History ==
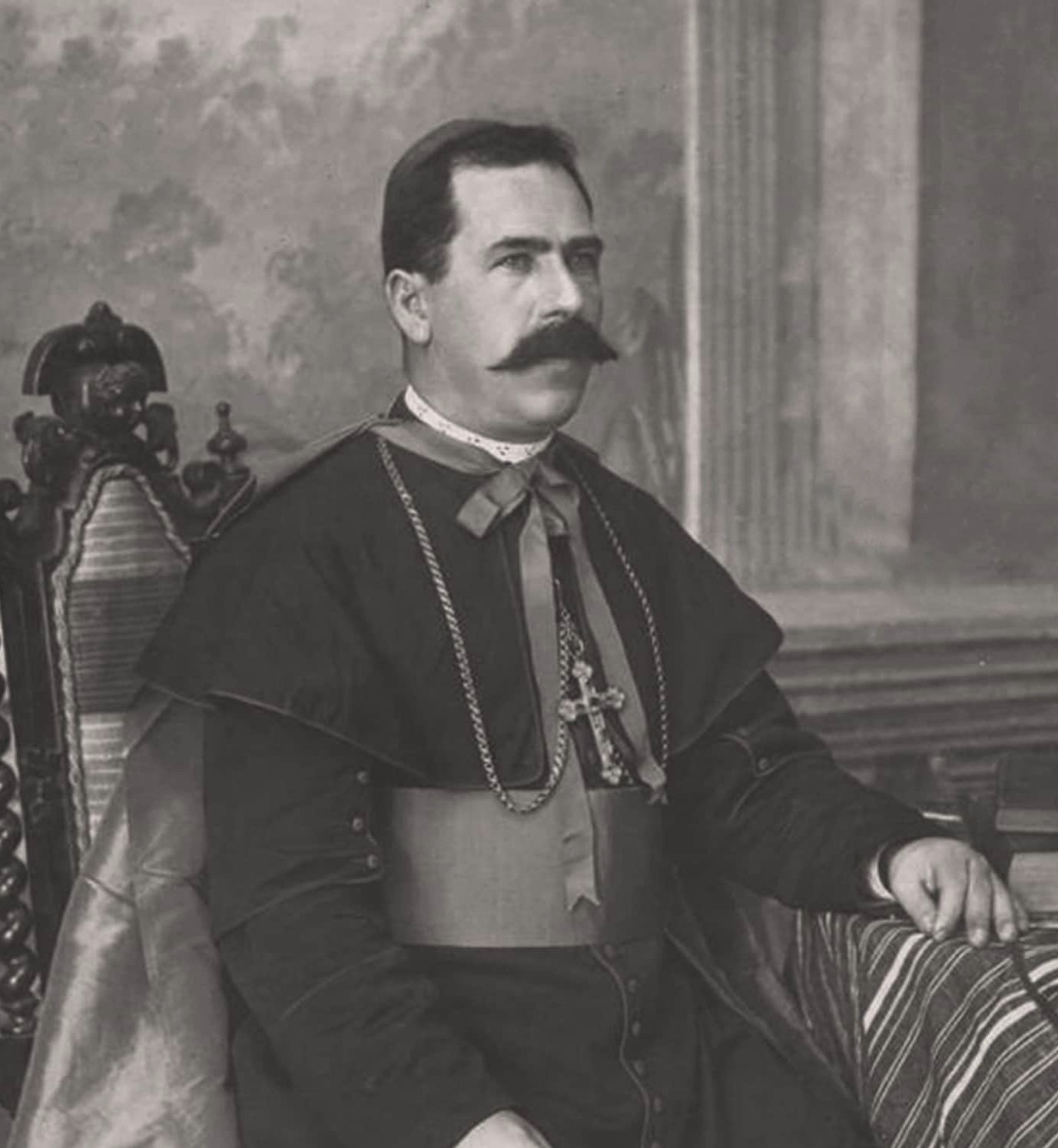
Archbishop Lazër Mjeda

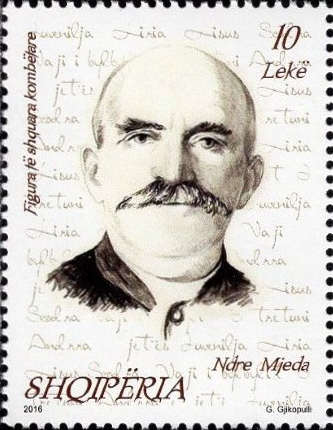
Dom Ndre Mjeda on a 2016 Albanian stamp

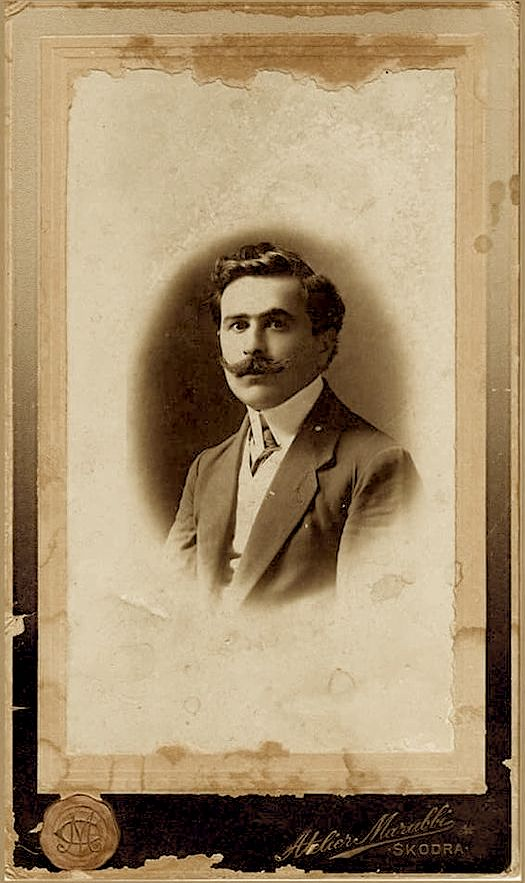
Kolë Mjeda

=== Origin ===
The progenitor of the Mjeda family is Bardhi Kryeziu. The Kryeziu are one of three branches of the Buzëzezë (Bucceseos), a feudal Albanian aristocratic clan, which held the Byzantine title of Sebastos since the 11th century. Milan Šufflay writes of Savasto Tanusius Bessossia (1274), as being one of the leading Albanian noblemen of the 13th century. The two other branches of the clan are the Bushati and the Buzuku. The clan’s territories included part of the Zadrima plain, the Pukë highlands, and the port of Shëngjin along with the coast up to Velipojë. The coat of arms of the Buzëzezë was the single-headed eagle.

=== Later Middle Ages ===
The Kryeziu branch was established in the 14th century and inherited the Lordship of Pukë. In the 15th century, Pal Ziu (Kryeziu), also known as Paolo Zenta, had the Catholic church constructed in Pukë, owned a castle near the town, and, according to Marin Barleti, was a relative of Lekë Dukagjini.

=== Ottoman Period ===
A branch of the Kryeziu family settled in Gjakovë at the beginning of the 17th century, and became beys soon after. At the beginning of the 18th century, another branch of the Kryeziu settled from Pukë to the village of Bardhet, which subsequently took the name of Kryezi. During the 18th and 19th centuries this branch governed the Pukë region, in accordance with the traditional laws of the Kanun of Pukë. The Ottoman administration recognized their ancient privileges and nobility of medieval origin, with their only obligation being to guard the Vau-Dejës - Kukës route.

Having settled in Shkodër from the village of Kryezi in the Pukë region, Bardhi Kryeziu took the surname Mjeda from the village near Shkodër where the family held lands. The Mjeda family today consists of two branches: Prizren and Shkodër. In Prizren they were the leading Catholic family, having the noble title of effendi, and were engaged in trade between the Italian peninsula, Constantinople, and the Balkans.

Over the centuries, members of the family were merchants, landowners, clerics, and political leaders. Today, they live mainly in Albania and Croatia.

== Notable members ==
- Ndre Mjeda (1866-1937), Albanian intellectual, jesuit priest, philologist, poet, and deputy in the National Assembly of Albania, during the Albanian National Awakening period. Delegate at the Congress of Manastir.
- Lukë Simon Mjeda (1867-1951), merchant and landowner who represented Prizren at the Second League of Prizren (1943).
- Lazër Mjeda (1869-1935), Bishop of Sapë (1900-1904), Archbishop of Skopje (1904-1909), Archbishop of Shkodër (1921-1935).
- Kolë Mjeda (1885-1951), Mayor of Shkodër (1924-1925), Vice-President of the National Assembly of Albania, Prefect of Dibër County.
- Luigj Pashko Mjeda (1890-1962), merchant, landowner, editor of the "Ora e Maleve" newspaper, head of the Municipality of Shkodër tax authority, and co-founder of the Bogdani Theatrical Society in Shkodër.
- Jak Mjeda, President of the Filigran Company, which employed 153 goldsmiths in Prizren.
