= Qerret =

- Administrative unit
- Location within Albania
- Coordinates: 42°3′N 19°50′E
- Country: Albania
- County: Shkodër
- Municipality: Pukë
  - Administrative unit: 230.71 km^{2} (89.08 sq mi)

Population (2011)
  - Administrative unit: 1,498
  - Administrative unit density: 6.493/km^{2} (16.82/sq mi)
- Time zone: UTC+1 (CET)
  - Summer (DST): UTC+2 (CEST)

Qerret is a village and a former municipality in the Shkodër County, northern Albania. At the 2015 local government reform it became a subdivision of the municipality Pukë. The population at the 2011 census was 1,498.

== Settlements ==
There are 12 settlements within Qerret:

1. Dush
2. Luf
3. Luf-plan
4. Kaftallë
5. Karmë
6. Kçir
7. Korthpulë
8. Plet
9. Gomsiqe
10. Qerret
11. Tejboder
12. Vrrith

There are two Qerrets, next to each other; Qerret i Eper (locally also known as Qerret i Madh) and Qerret i Poshtem (locally also known as Qerret i Vogel). Qerret i Eper is larger and has more inhabitants. It is mainly flat and it is surrounded by hills. It has a small river that flows across the village approximately from North to South which in summer almost dries at places due to its water redirected to be used to irrigate the village's fields. There is a road (tarmacked in 2010) which connects the village to Puka (the centre of the district) and the rest of the region. There are also other roads of inferior quality (suitable for off-road vehicles only) connecting Qerret with other neighbouring villages. Qerret i Eper is bordered by: Qerret i Poshtem at the northern edge, Puka at the eastern edge, Pla-Keqire at the southern edge and Dush at the western edge. There is a school for children up to 15 years old in the village. Qerret i Eper is entirely of the Muslim faith.
