= Lazër Mjeda =

Catholic archbishop (1869–1935)

Monsignor Lazër Mjeda
- Archbishop of Roman Catholic Archdiocese of Shkodër-Pult
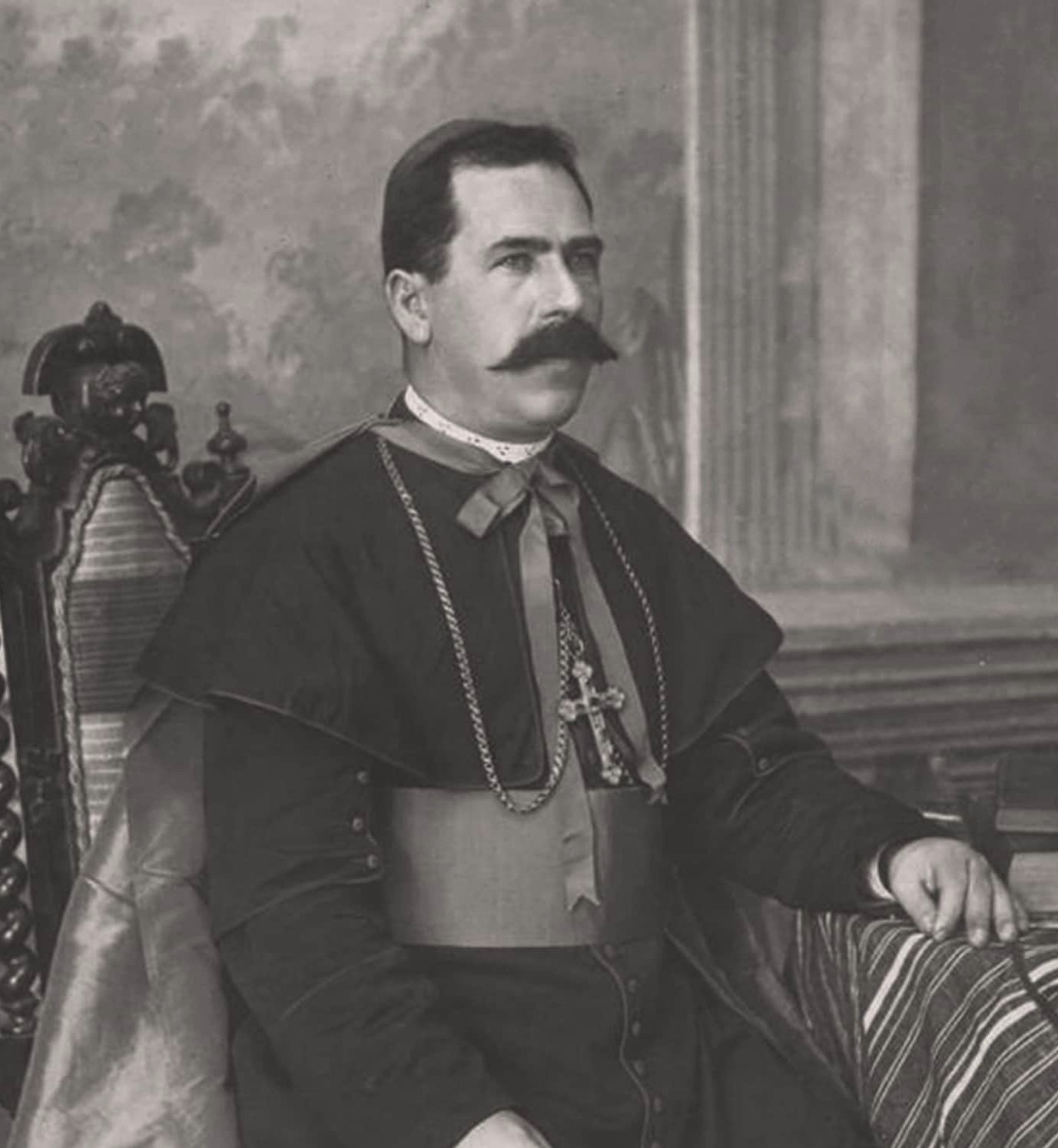
- Lazër Mjeda
- Archdiocese: Roman Catholic Archdiocese of Shkodër-Pult
- See: Shkodër
- In office: 1921-1935
- Predecessor: Jakë Serreqi
- Successor: Gasper Thaçi
- Other posts: Bishop of The Roman Catholic Diocese of Sapë; Archbishop of Roman Catholic Diocese of Skopje

Personal details
- Born: Lazër Mjeda; 3 June 1869 Mjeda, Zadrima, Ottoman Empire (Present-day Albania)
- Died: 7 August 1935 (aged 66)
- Denomination: Roman Catholic

Lazër Mjeda (1869–1935) was an ethnic Albanian priest and prelate of the Catholic Church in Albania, and a member of the Mjeda family.

== Biography ==
Lazër (Llazar) Mjeda was born in Shkodër, Ottoman Empire — present-day Albania — on 6 March 1869. From 1900 to 1904 he was the Bishop of the Roman Catholic Diocese of Sapë, while from 1905 to 1909 he was the Archbishop of the Roman Catholic Diocese of Shkodër. During this time, the Catholic Church also made him the Titular Archbishop for the Diocese of Areopolis. From mid 1909 till late 1921, Mjeda was the Archbishop of the Diocese of Skopje. During the 1912-1913 Balkan Wars, his detailed report of Serbian war crimes, widespread massacres, and ethnic cleansing against both Albanian Catholics and Muslims in his Diocese was carefully investigated by the Austro-Hungarian Foreign Office and ruled to be a credible source.

From 1921 he was the Archbishop of the Roman Catholic Archdiocese of Shkodër-Pult.

Mjeda was member of the literary society Society for the Unity of the Albanian Language (Albanian: Shoqnia e Bashkimit të Gjuhës Shqipe, Bashkimi i Shkodrës), creator of Bashkimi alphabet, one of the main Albanian alphabets discussed in the Congress of Monastir of 1908.

== Sources ==
- Albert Ramaj: LAZËR MJEDA NË ARGJIPESHKVINË SHKUP-PRIZREN MES 1909-1921 (Sipas arkivit Austriak, emërimi tij, laramanizmi, largimi nga Prizreni) (S. 47-172) in: IMZOT LAZËR MJEDA- Mbrojtës dhe lëvrues i identitetit shqiptar, St. Gallen 2011 (ISBN 978-3-9523077-7-9)
