= Ndre Mjeda =

Albanian poet (1866–1937)

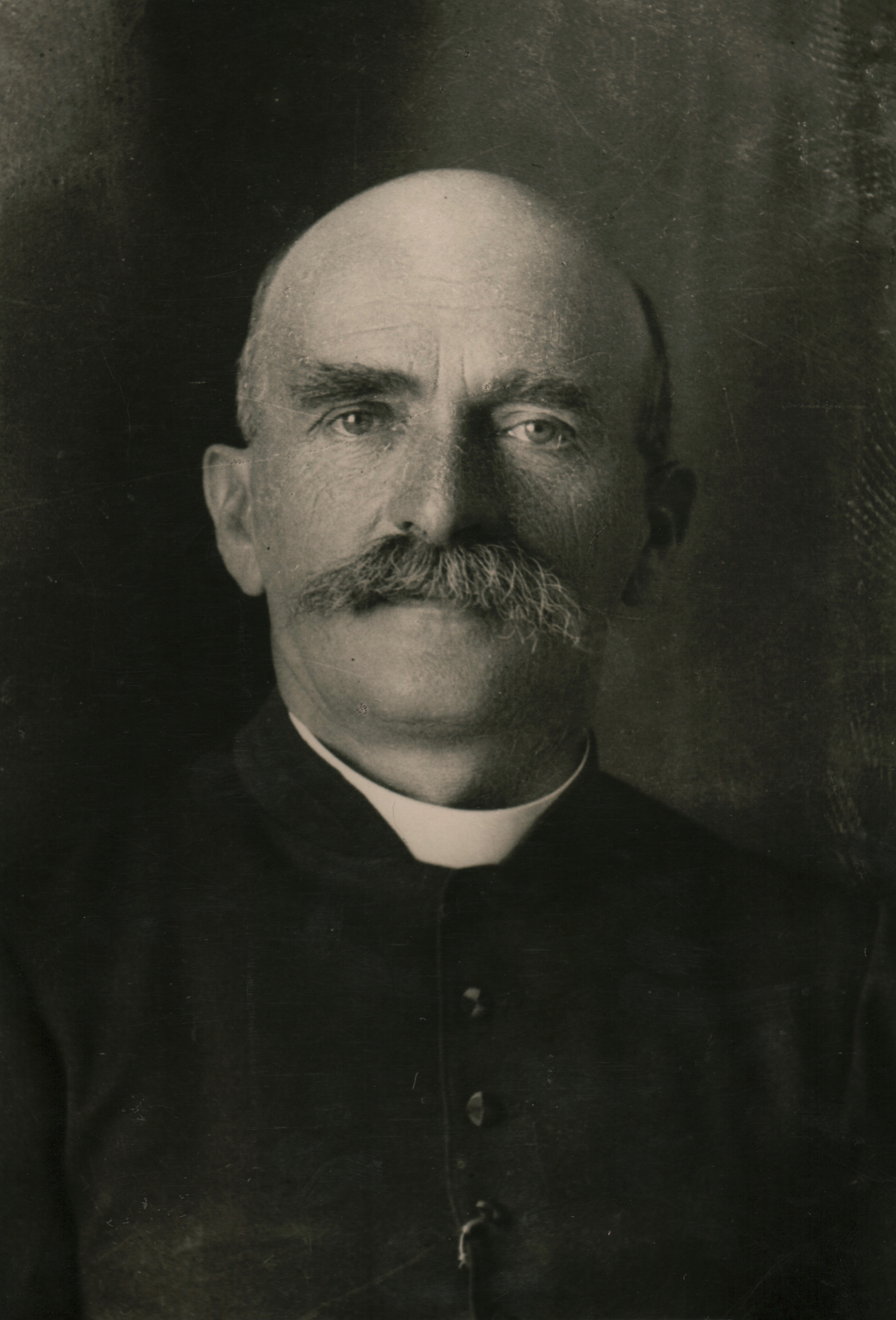
- Portrait of Ndre Mjeda photographed by Kel Marubi, 1920s
- Born: 20 November 1866; Shkodër, Ottoman Empire
- Died: 1 August 1937 (aged 70); Shkodër, Albanian Kingdom
- Occupations: Philologist; poet; priest; rilindas; writer
- Writing career
- Language: Albanian; Italian; Latin; Spanish
- Genre: Romanticism
- Movement: Albanian Renaissance

Ndre Mjeda (20 November 1866 – 1 August 1937) was an Albanian philologist, poet, priest, rilindas, translator and writer of the Albanian Renaissance. He was a member of the Mjeda family.

He was influenced by the Jesuit writer Anton Xanoni and the Franciscan poet Leonardo De Martino.

== Life ==
From 1880 until 1887, Mjeda studied literature at the Carthusian monastery of Porta Coeli, in Valencia, Spain, rhetoric, Latin and Italian in Croatia at a Jesuit institution, at the Gregorian University in Rome, and at another Gregorian college in Chieri, Italy. During these studies, Mjeda began to write Albanian poetry. Some of his most famous poems include Vaji i Bylbylit (The Nightingale's Lament) (1887) and Vorri i Skanderbegut (Skanderbeg's grave).

Mjeda also taught music in Cremona, Italy, at the College of Marco Girolamo Vida from 1887 to 1891, and translated various religious literature. He published Jeta e sceitit sc' Gnon Berchmans (The Life of St John Berchmans) (1888), and T' perghjamit e Zojs Bekume (Imitation of the Holy Virgin) (1892), a translation from Spanish, Katekizmi i Madh (The Great Catechism), another translation, and Historia e Shejtë (Sacred History).

Mjeda later on studied theology at the Jesuit college in Kraków, Poland, and taught philosophy and philology, as well as served as a librarian at the Gregorian college in Kraljevica, where he was also appointed professor of logic and metaphysics. He was expelled in 1898 after a conflict between Austria-Hungary and the Vatican. In 1899, Mjeda, along with Preng Doçi and Gjergj Fishta founded the Shoqnia e bashkimit të gjuhës shqipe (Society for the Unity of the Albanian Language) literary society, usually known as the Shoqnia Bashkimi (The Union Society), or simply Bashkimi (The Union) of Shkodra for publishing Albanian language books.

In 1901, Mjeda founded the Agimi (Dawn) Society in Shkodër. Mjeda devised the Agimi alphabet based on Latin characters following the principle of one letter for a sound and used diacritic marks for other peculiar sounds in the Albanian language. In Hamburg 1902, Mjeda's alphabet was approved by the International Congress of the Orientalists and in May by most of the Catholic clergy in Shkodër. Books subsidized by Austria-Hungary were published in the Agimi Alphabet which rivaled the Bashkimi Alphabet for writing Albanian. In 1908, Mjeda was a delegate at the Albanian alphabet Congress of Monastir representing the Agimi Society. Mjeda supported the Latin character Istanbul alphabet as it contained the principle of one letter, one sound and its Latin characters were also similar to the rival Bashkimi alphabet. Toward the late Ottoman period, Mjeda supported Austro-Hungarian intervention in Albanian affairs within the Ottoman Empire.

Mjeda served as a member of the Albanian Literary Commission, in Shkodër, under the Austro-Hungarian administration, as well as a deputy in the National Assembly of Albania. He left politics after Fan Noli's defeat, and the rise of King Zog. He then served as a parish priest in Kukël, and taught the Albanian language and literature at the Jesuit college in Shkodër until his death.

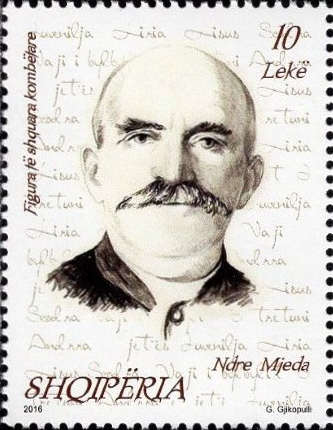
Mjeda on a 2016 stamp of Albania

== See also ==
- Albanian literature
- Culture of Albania
