= Battle of Vranina =

Conflict in 1862

- Part of the Albanian National Awakening
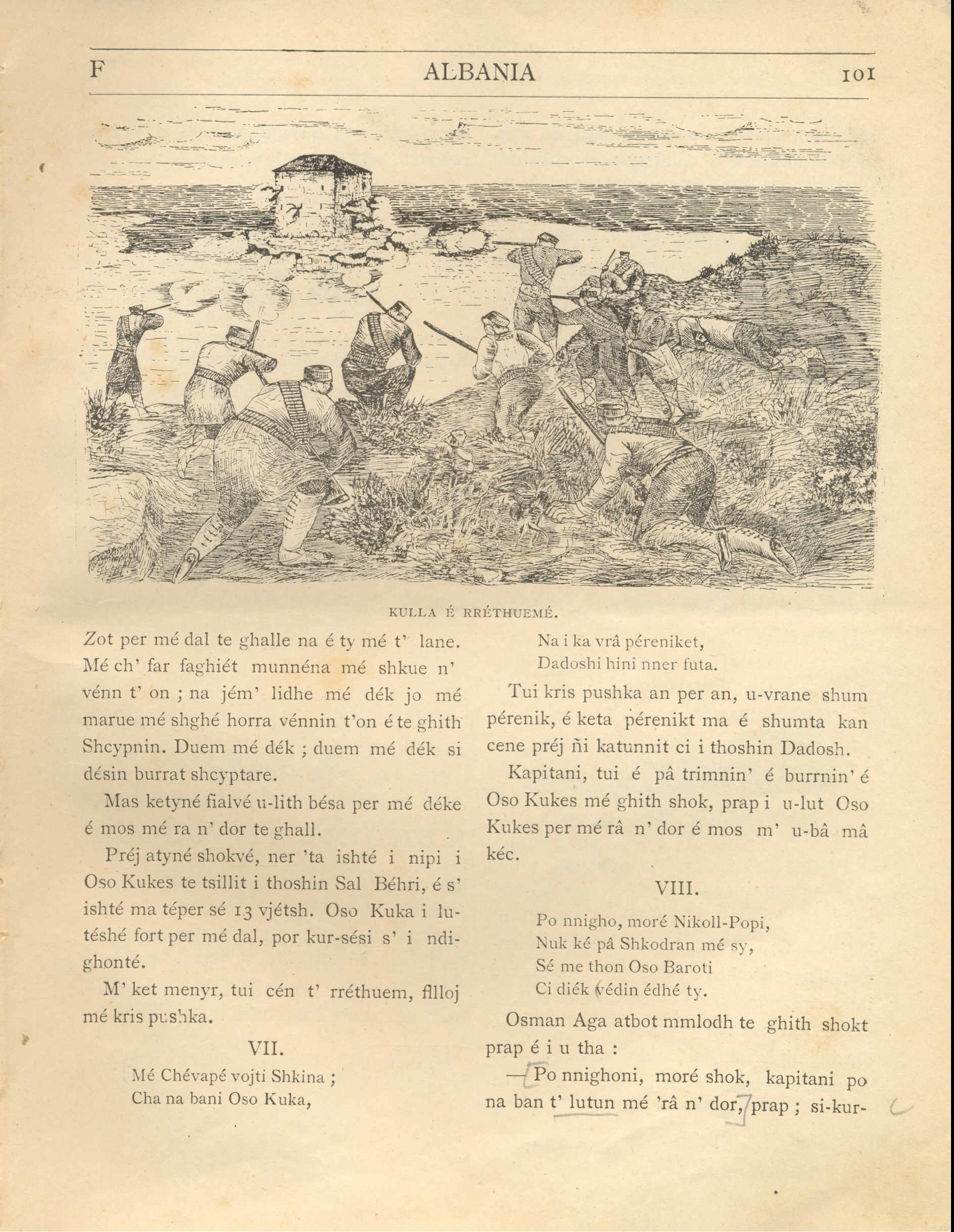
- Montenegrin forces surrounding the second tower of Vranina.
Date	1862
Location	Vranjina, Sanjak of Scutari, Ottoman Empire (present-day Montenegro) 42°16′42″N 19°08′05″E
Result	Albanian victory: Vranina remains under Albanian control

Belligerents
Sanjak of Scutari	Montenegro

Commanders and leaders
Oso Kuka †; Hodo Sokoli; Avdi Pasha	Nicholas I of Montenegro; Vulo Serdar

Units involved
Albanian-Montenegrin border patrol unit Hoti tribesmen	Armed forces of the Principality of Montenegro

Strength
Lesser; 28 troops in the second tower	8,000 troops; 2,000 troops in the second tower

Casualties and losses
Unknown; 28 troops in the second tower killed	Unknown; 200+ troops in the second tower killed
- Location within modern-day Montenegro

The Battle of Vranina also known as the Vranina War was an armed conflict between Albanian irregulars and the Principality of Montenegro in the region of Vranina (modern-day Vranjina) near the Ottoman-Montenegrin border in the year of 1862 which occurred when 8,000 Montenegrin soldiers attacked the village of Vranina, besieging its fortress as well as a second tower located near it.

== Background ==
The village and island of Vranjina is a settlement located im modern-day Montenegro. It is thought to have existed since 2500 years ago, with there being two Illyrian temples located on the island. Under Ottoman control it remained as a part of the Pashalik of Scutari and then the Sanjak of Scutari. Its close location to Scutari made it a strategic location sought out by the Principality of Montenegro. It, together with nearby villages were regularly patrolled by Oso Kuka's çetë.

== Conflict ==
During the month of June 1862 a Montenegrin army consisting of 8,000 troops led by general Vulo Serdar surrounded the tower of Vranina, which consisted of a lesser amount of troops led by Hodo Sokoli. The outnumbered Albanians engaged with the Montenegrins, leading to heavy fighting throughout the village. During the battle, Montenegrin troops also pillaged and massacred the local Albanian population. Due to this, the Albanians requested Ottoman reinforcements, however, Avdi Pasha, the governor of the Sanjak of Scutari did not send the Ottoman army, instead sending Oso Kuka, the general of the patrol unit in the Albanian-Montenegrin border, together with his çetë which consisted of 27 other Albanians. The armed militia reached and set up fortification in the second tower of Vranina which housed a large supply of gun powder. The tower was besieged by a contingent of 2000 Montenegrin soldiers. Fighting would go on to continue, however due to a depleting amount of ammunition Albanian positions began to weaken and the irregulars were unable to launch a counter-attack. Due to this, Oso Kuka and his 27 other çetë members set fire to the gun powder supply in the second tower, which led to an explosion that, besides killing Oso Kuka and the other irregulars in the tower, also killed more than 200 Montenegrin soldiers. Upon seeing this, the Montenegrins withdrew from Vranina.

== Aftermath ==
Vranina would remain under Ottoman control until 1879. After the Congress of Berlin it was given to Montenegro.

=== Legacy ===
According to author Hamdi Bushati, throughout all of Montenegro men and women dressed in all-black clothes to honour the fallen soldiers killed after the explosion of the second tower. According to Bushati, there was also a monument built in Northern Albania attributing Oso Kuka, however it was destroyed by Albanian communists in the 1940's after the end of World War II. Oso Kuka and his other çetë members were mentioned and honoured in Gjergj Fishta's Lahuta e Malcis.
