= Paçram, Albania =

Paçram
- Village
- Location within Albania
- Coordinates: 41°57′28″N 19°35′2″E
- Country: Albania
- County: Shkodër
- Municipality: Vau i Dejës
- Administrative unit: Hajmel
- Time zone: UTC+1 (CET)
  - Summer (DST): UTC+2 (CEST)

Paçram is a settlement in the former Hajmel municipality, Shkodër County, northern Albania. At the 2015 local government reform it became part of the municipality Vau i Dejës. It is part of the Zadrimë region.

== History ==
Paçram is recorded in the Ottoman defters of 1571 and 1591 for the Sanjak of Dukagjin as a village in the kaza of Zadrima. In 1571 the settlement had a total of 7 households, while two decades later in 1591 it had slightly increased to total of 9. Paçram (Pocerami) is then recorded in 1641 by the Bishop of Sapë, Frang Bardhi, in a report on Zadrima. In his report, the village is listed as among the settlements belonging to the parish of Saint Pantaleon of Maba - where the locals travelled to in order to receive their sacraments. Bardhi also notes that Paçram had a total of 7 households.

According to local oral traditions recorded by Dom Gaspër Gurakuqi (1885-1967) in the 20th century, Paçram was originally inhabited by Albanian Catholics, however, as a result of various outbreaks of the plague in the region, the village was left uninhabited and abandoned. As a consequence, Paçram was repopulated by Albanian Muslims; becoming entirely Muslim. According to Gurakuqi, these families all descended from a single patrilineal ancestor who had arrived from Gusinje in eastern Montenegro and bore the surname Çelaj. This ancestor and his brother first settled in neighbouring Bushat, later settling in Paçram while his brother remained in Bushat founding the local Çelaj brotherhood. Gurakuqi further notes that aside from these older Muslim families, a couple of families from nearby Shkjezë and Hajmel later settled Paçram as a result of the population displacements caused by the Balkan Wars.

In 1922 Paçram had a total of 201 inhabitants, 172 of which were Muslims and 29 were Catholics.

As a result of migrations towards the urban centres of northern Albania such as Shkodra during the second half of the 20th century, the local Muslims of Paçram abandoned the village. Consequently, the village has been settled largely by Catholics from the neighbouring regions.
