= Pjetër Zarishi =

19th century Catholic priest and poet from Shkodra

Dom Pjetër Zarishi
- Born: 16 February 1806; Blinisht, Zadrima, Ottoman Empire
- Died: 1866; Kallmet, Lezhë, Ottoman Empire
- Other name: Dom Pjeter Xarishi
- Occupations: Catholic priest and poet
- Known for: establishing a tradition of the 19th century Catholic literature in northern Albania

Pjetër Zarishi or Dom Pjeter Xarishi (1806 in Blinisht, Zadrima – 1866 in Kallmet, Lezhë) was an Albanian Mirditë Catholic priest and poet who established a tradition of the 19th century Catholic literature in northern Albania. He is also noted for his literary contribution to the Albanian National Awakening. His poems were primarily religious and in less extent secular.

== Life ==
Zarishi was born on February 16, 1806, in Blinisht, a village in Zadrima, back then part of Ottoman Empire. He was educated at the training college of the Propaganda Fide. He was first appointed as a secretary of the Italian bishop of the Roman Catholic Diocese of Sapë in Nënshat, in the Shkoder Archdiocese who was transferred to Orosh and appointed as abbot of the remote Abbey of Orosh after one disagreement with bishop of Sapa. Zarishi and Dotmaze from Shkoder were assistants of Karlo Krasnik, a Catholic priest. In Orosh Zarishi initially maintained a close cooperation with local Mirdite leaders and particularly with Dod Bib Pasha.

When Ilija Garašanin, through Krasnik, approached to Dod Bib Pasha to propose to Mirdita to join anti-Ottoman revolt, the Pasha accepted to ally with Serbia in exchange for the autonomy of his tribe and freedom to keep their Catholic faith within Serbian state. On the other hand, Zarishi and Dotmaze were opposed to participation of Mirdite tribe in the uprising against Ottomans because they believed it would not be effective.

Because of the conflict with some Mirdita chieftains, he was forced to leave Orosh and to settle in Kallmet where he died in 1866. His pupil Petar Draguša later wrote that Zarishi was so good an orator that more than once listeners of his speeches broke down crying.
