= Ashtë =

- Village
- Location within Albania
- Coordinates: 42°0′39″N 19°32′8″E
- Country: Albania
- County: Shkodër
- Municipality: Vau i Dejës
- Administrative unit: Bushat
- Time zone: UTC+1 (CET)
  - Summer (DST): UTC+2 (CEST)

Ashtë is a settlement in the former Bushat municipality, Shkodër County, northern Albania. Under the 2015 local government reform, it became part of the municipality Vau i Dejës. The first settlers are believed to have settled here the mid-18th century.

The population of village at its peak, prior to the fall of communism, was 950 people. Under the atheist communist regime, the population of Ashtë remained staunchly 100% Roman Catholic. Recently, the residents and the church have cooperated to build a new church on land donated by Mr. Zek Gjoni (Jozef Johnny) of Dedi tribe.

The population of Ashtë village has now declined to about half its former number. The majority of emigrants are based in Italy; others have moved to USA, UK, Germany, Canada, and Greece.
