= Dajç, Lezhë =

Dajç
- Administrative unit
- Location within Albania
- Coordinates: 41°55′N 19°36′E
- Country: Albania
- County: Lezhë
- Municipality: Lezhë

Population (2023)
  - Administrative unit: 2,584
- Time zone: UTC+1 (CET)
  - Summer (DST): UTC+2 (CEST)
- Postal Code: 4506

Dajç is a village and a former municipality in the Lezhë County, northwestern Albania. At the 2015 local government reform it became a subdivision of the municipality Lezhë. The population at the 2023 census was 2,584. It is part of the Zadrimë region.

Dajç is located in the midspan between the city of Lezhë to the south and Shkodër to the north, 15 kilometres (9.3 mi) from each. It has an agricultural-based economy, with many producing fields, but in need of better mechanics and organized market. Dajç has all important institutions for a small commune like: Schools from kindergarten to High level, Municipality buildings, Health Center with an onsite family doctor- full-time five days a week, Catholic Church and Sisters Residence, many shops and a cafeteria. Population is about 7000, for the whole commune. The town of Dajç comprises several quarters such as: Gazullore, Milot, Mazrekë, Zeznjane, Laskare, Suka, and peripherals.

== History ==
People of this region are called Zadrimorë, from its field name 'Zadrima' stretching from Shkodër to Lezhë cities. This region has a very rich cultural tradition. It has withstood the 500 years of Ottoman invasion, saving its Christian religion of Catholicism; area is all of this religion, (thought to be established directly by St. Paul in the 1st century, while he passed through Albanian lands).

On October 7 is the town's holiday of the St. Rosary, celebrated vigorously with many visits, church mass, prayers, and numerous activities. Zadrimë is well known for its fine cheese, yogurt, milk, buttermilk and butter.

== Economy ==
Livelihoods of the people are mainly field work, growing crops including grain and vegetables, foraging, arboriculture (figs, plums, and pears), and some vineyards. With the new main highway, SH1 / E762 running by the village South-North from Tirana to the Montenegro border, trade and economical development is expected to thrive in the coming years.

There are many new houses being built every day, and the face of the town in changing continuously.

== Politics and administration ==
Dajç is the center for seven other villages: Mabë, Dragushë, Kotërr, Kodhel, Gjadër, Zojz, and Gramsh. The neighboring municipalities are; Blinisht – LE, Balldre-LE, Barbullush-SH, Bushat-SH, Stajkë-SH, Hajmel-SH, Nenshat-SH. Dajç’s Commune is in the border with the Shkodër County.

The actual administrative unit is based in Dajç, part of Municipality of Lezhe.

== Nature ==
In the middle of town passes the Gjadër river, collecting irrigation waters and other water sources. Dajç's main housing is located on the hills facing North-East. The hills elevation is up to 45 metres (148 ft) above sea level.

The geographical coordinates are 42°55’ N, and 19°36’ E. Approximate town area is 8 square kilometres (3.1 sq mi).

On the past field were run and covered by rain flooding; now it is believed that the drainage system of these fields is pretty functional.

The average temperature in summer is 30–37 °C (86–99 °F) and 0–10 °C (32–50 °F) in winter. Average solar days are 292 annually.

== Culture ==
During 2021, it is built the remembrance park for the Religious, cultural and science people of Gazulli kin blood line. It is a park consisting of a main area, symbolizing a library, dedicated these talented people, beginning from middle ages, to last political regime. There are engraved pictures of Gjon Gazulli, Pal Gazulli, Nikoll Gazulli, a list of names and years lived.
