= Shkjezë =

- Village
- Location within Albania
- Coordinates: 41°57′18″N 19°32′27″E
- Country: Albania
- County: Shkodër
- Municipality: Vau i Dejës
- Administrative unit: Bushat
- Time zone: UTC+1 (CET)
  - Summer (DST): UTC+2 (CEST)

Shkjezë is a settlement in the former Bushat municipality, Shkodër County, northern Albania. At the 2015 local government reform it became part of the municipality Vau i Dejës. It is part of the Zadrimë region.
