= Zojz =

Zojz may refer to:

- Zojz (deity), an Albanian sky and lightning god
- Zojz, Prizren, a settlement in Prizren Municipality, southern Kosovo
- Zojs or Zojz, a settlement in Lezhë County, northwestern Albania
