= Paçram =

Paçram may refer to:

- Paçram, Shkodër, a settlement in Albania
- Fadil Paçrami, Albanian former politician
