= Hylli i Dritës =

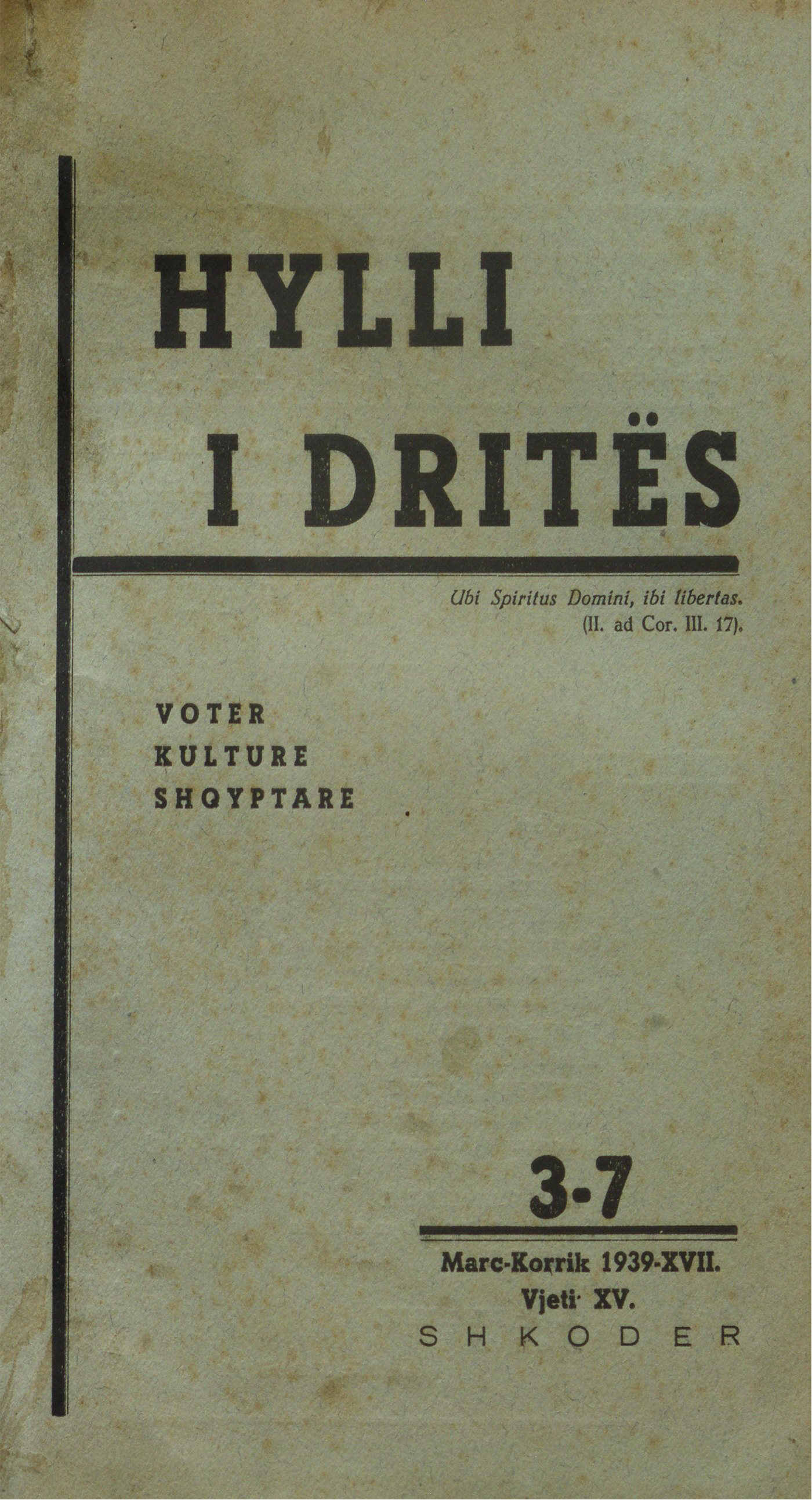
- 1940 issue of Hylli i Dritës
- Editor: Gjergj Fishta (1913-1942); Anton Harapi (1942-44); Zef Pllumi (1993-97); Ardian Ndreca (2007-present)
- Categories: Politics, Literature, History, Folklore
- Frequency: Monthly
- Publisher: Gazmend Tinaj (2006-present)
- First issue: 1913
- Country: Albania
- Language: Albanian
- Website: Hylli i Dritës

Hylli i Dritës (English: The Star of Light) is an Albanian periodical first published in 1913 by Gjergj Fishta, one of the most notable writers and poets of Albanian literature. It is regarded as one of the most important Albanian magazines of the early 20th century.

== History ==
Hylli i Dritës was first published in 1913 in Shkodër, Albania by Gjergj Fishta, an important author of Albanian literature. At that time it was published and circulated by the Nikaj Press and supported by notable figures such as Luigj Gurakuqi. After World War I erupted in 1914 its publication and circulation was banned by the Austrian occupiers, because the magazine promoted Albanian interests and anti-Central Powers beliefs.

In 1921 it was republished by Gjergj Fishta with support from the Democratic party led by Fan Noli, a notable figure of Albanian literature, and the Franciscan Albanians of Shkodër and Lezhë. In 1924 a revolution that overthrew the regime of Zog I, King of Albania and established a democratic government with Fan S. Noli as its prime minister took place. After the restoration of Zog's regime Hylli i Dritës was banned again because of Gjergj Fishta's support towards the Democratic party until 1930.

In 1930 the periodical was republished by Gjergj Fishta and during that period it became the most important periodical of northern Albania and one of the most important Albanian magazines. Since 1942 its editor was Anton Harapi, an Albanian philosopher supported by notable Albanians of Shkodër. In July 1944 it was banned by the newly established Communist regime of Enver Hoxha.

After the disestablishment of the Communist regime it was republished from 1993 to 1997 with Zef Pllumi, an Albanian writer as its editor. While it was discontinued in 1997 it was republished in 2006 with Adrian Ndreca as its new editor since 2007.

== Content ==
Since its first issue Hylli i Dritës has included topics mainly regarding politics, history, language, literature and folklore. Since 1993 it also frequently includes works of authors formerly censored until 1991. Many notable Albanian authors like Eqerem Çabej, one of the most important Albanian linguists have first published articles regarding their works in the periodical. Parts of Lahuta e Malcís (English: The Highland Lute), one of the most important Albanian epics were also first published in Hylli i Dritës.

== See also ==
- List of magazines in Albania
- Gjergj Fishta
