= Oso Kuka =

Albanian military commander

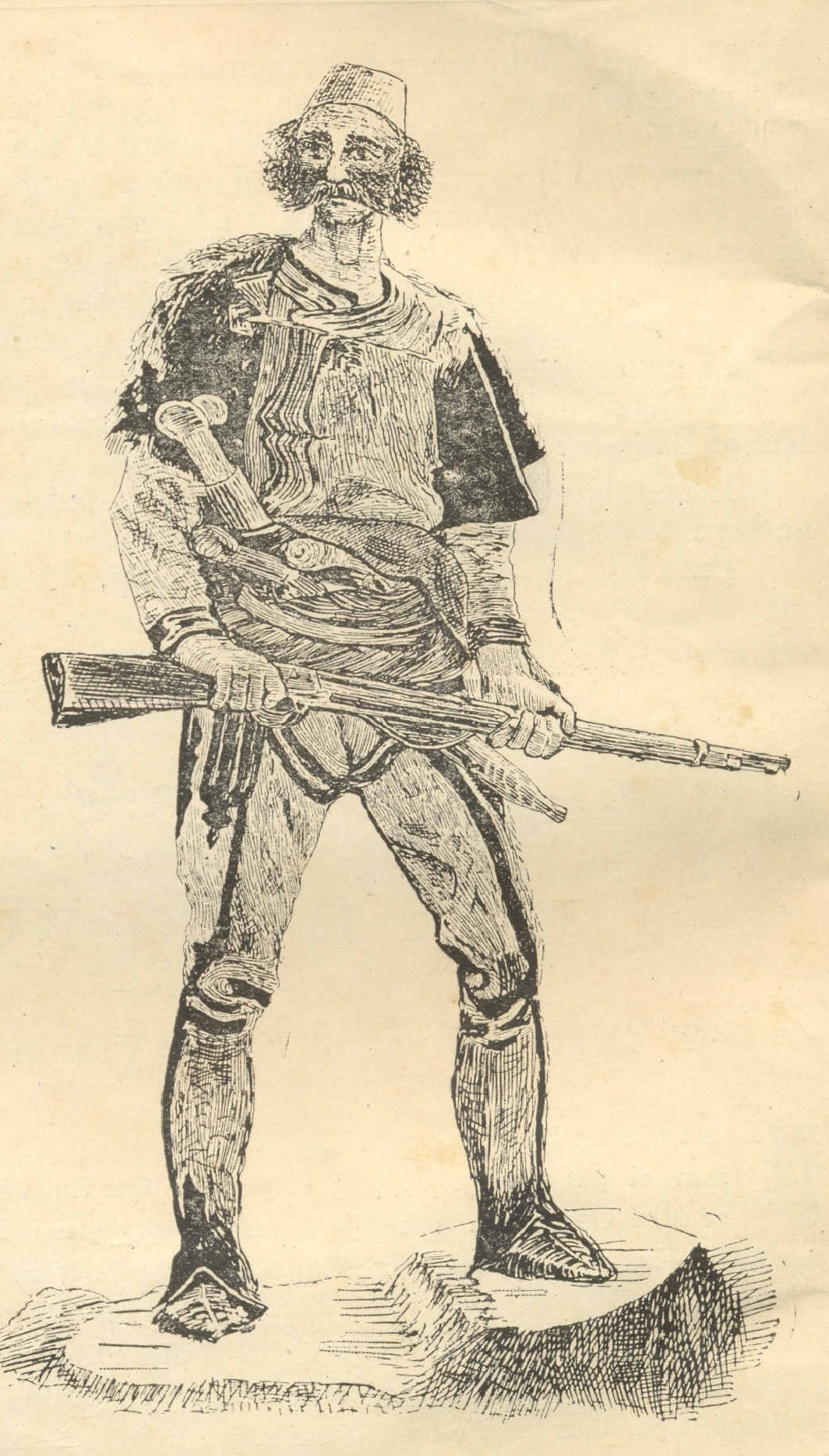
- Drawing of Oso Kuka, from the June 1901 issue of the Albania newspaper of Faik Konitza
- Born: c. 1820; Shkodër, Ottoman Empire
- Died: 1862; Vranjina, Montenegro
- Other name: Osman Kuka
- Occupations: a border guard and commander
- Years active: 1862
- Known for: Blowing up the tower of Vranina

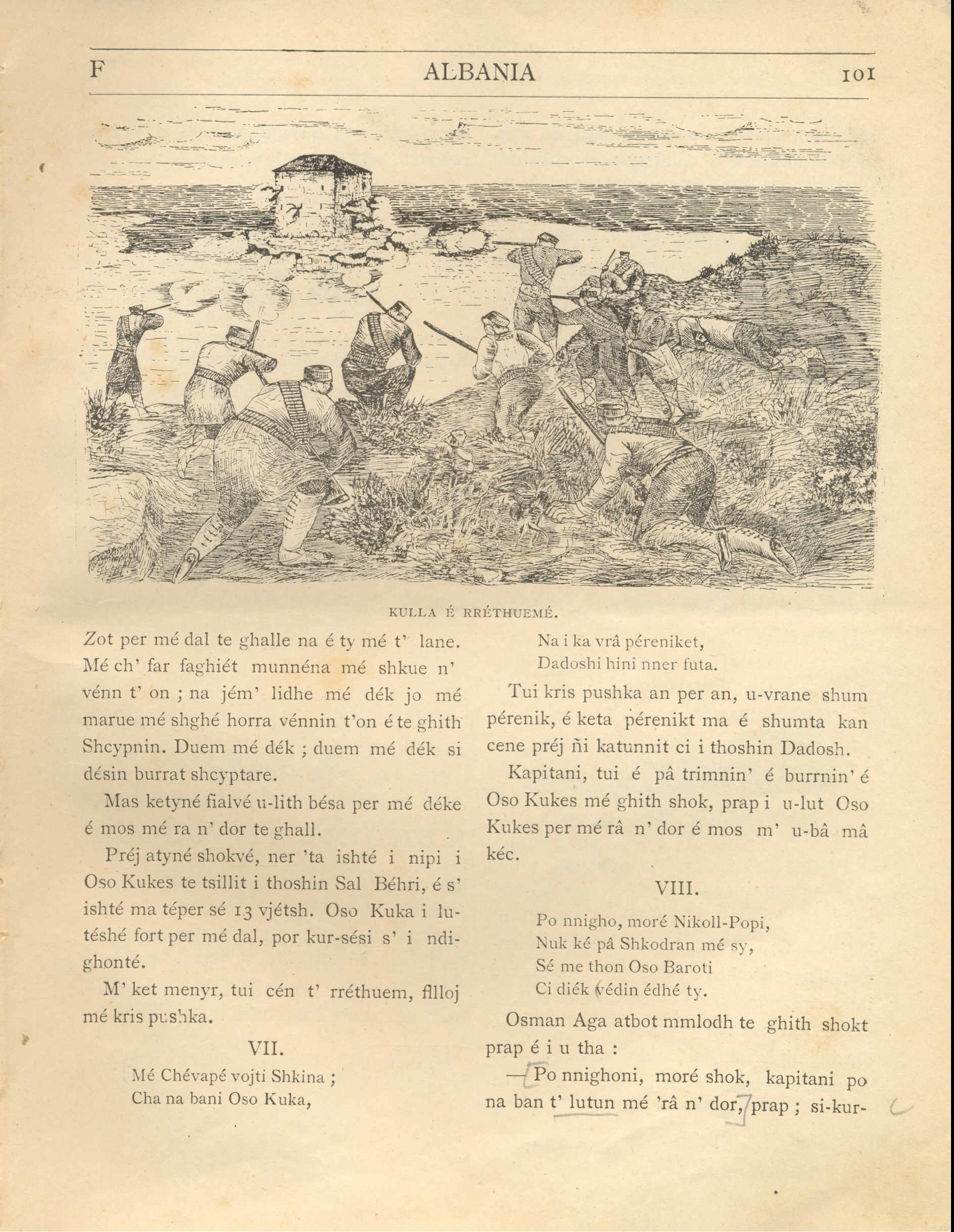
The drawing shows Montenegrin soldiers surrounding Oso Kuka and his men in the gunpowder tower.

Osman Bejtullah Agë Kuka, also known as Oso Kuka (c. 1812/1820–1862), was an Albanian border guard on the Albanian-Montenegrin border under the Ottoman Empire. Surrounded by Montenegrin soldiers in an Albanian tower on the island of Vranjina in Albania, he blew it up, killing himself in order to kill the Montenegrin soldiers. In the following decades, he became a rallying figure of the Albanian independence movement and a much-celebrated character in multiple important works in Albanian literature.

== Background ==
Two decades earlier, several battles had been fought over the possession of the island, primarily between Ottoman forces (joined by Albanians) and Montenegrins. Between 1835 and 1844, various rebellions among Albanian highlanders against the Porte led to the enforcement of Montenegrin interests. On October 16, 1843, Albanian forces numbering 12,000, led by the Governor of Shkodër, invested the island. The Albanians arrived at the lake with 50-60 cannons and opened fire against the Montenegrin troops in the tower. The Ottomans blew up the tower, killing 7 and wounding 18, who were captured. The Ottomans also seized the tower of Lesendra with 10,000 to 12,000 troops. The Montenegrins, numbering 200, fled and were met with harsh criticism by their countrymen. They tried to reclaim the island several times under Petar II Petrović-Njegoš, but failed. In 1844, Albanian highlanders from Shkodër sailed with 4 ships to the island of Vranjina to build barracks in order to resist Montenegrin forces.

== Life ==
Osa Kuka was born around 1812 or 1820 in Shkodër, Albania in a timariot family, from a Catholic Albanian family recently converted. His family also held several other positions in the Sanjak of Scutari, with his grandfather and other relatives being kethüda of the castle. His father, Bejtullah agë Kuka, was standard-bearer of the Albanian Pasha and Vezir, Mustafa Pasha of Shkodra of the powerful Bushati dynasty. In 1859, due to the proposition of the Albanian-Ottoman commander Hodo Sokoli, Oso Kuka was promoted to the rank of yüzbaşı of the border guards on the Ottoman-Montenegrin border.

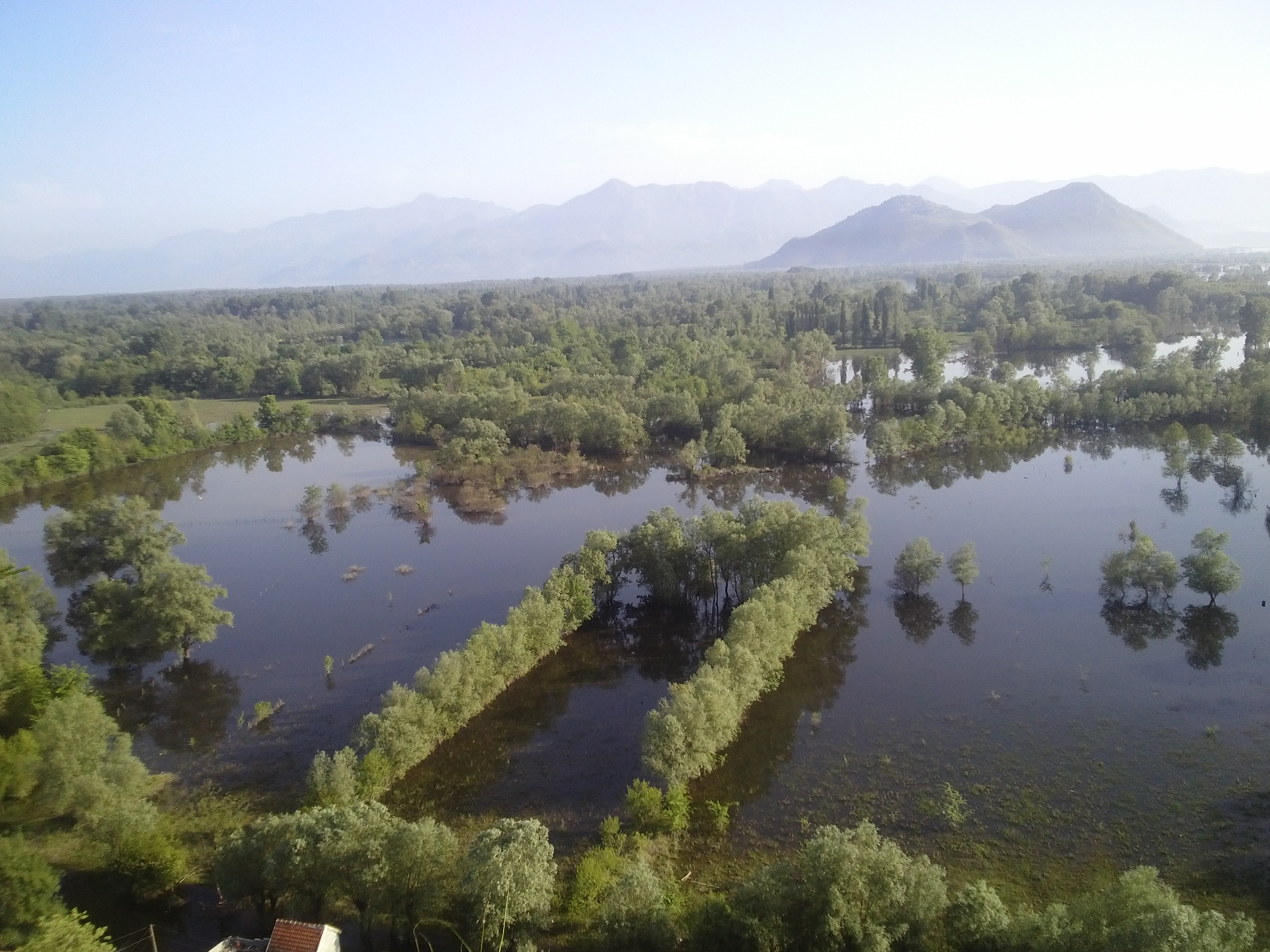
Vranjina, view from Žabljak Crnojevića

Oso Kuka himself had formed a 24-man band (çetë) that was active in the city. At the head of a small group, Oso Kuka arrived on the battlefield where 8,000 Montenegrin soldiers had been besieging the fort of Vranjina. Kuka and his group were defending a secondary tower in front of the main tower. When it was surrounded, instead of surrendering, Kuka planted explosives in the tower. He then activated them when the tower was stormed by the Montenegrins, thereby killing hundreds of Montenegrin soldiers along with his group. His bravery made it possible for Vranina to stay under Albanian control until 1879, when it was ceded to Montenegro by the Congress of Berlin.

== Legacy ==
Over the decades, Oso Kuka became a major rallying figure of the Albanian national awakening. One of the most important representations of Oso Kuka in literature is found in Gjergj Fishta's epic Lahuta e Malcis, in which Oso Kuka's involvement in the war and his death comprise the first five cantos, also known as the "cycle of Oso Kuka." Ndre Zadeja also wrote a melodrama titled Oso Kuka, based on his life.

His residence in Shkodër houses the city's historical museum, while the Slavic-speaking population of the small village in Vranjina (modern-day Montenegro) show to visitors the so-called "house of Oso Kuka."
