= Pistull =

- Village
- Location within Albania
- Coordinates: 41°58′6″N 19°35′11″E
- Country: Albania
- County: Shkodër
- Municipality: Vau i Dejës
- Administrative unit: Hajmel
- Time zone: UTC+1 (CET)
  - Summer (DST): UTC+2 (CEST)

Pistull is a settlement in the former Hajmel municipality, Shkodër County, northern Albania. At the 2015 local government reform it became part of the municipality Vau i Dejës. It is part of the Zadrimë region.
