= Gjergj Fishta =

Albanian franciscan, poet, educator and politician (1871–1940)

Gjergj Fishta FJO TtF
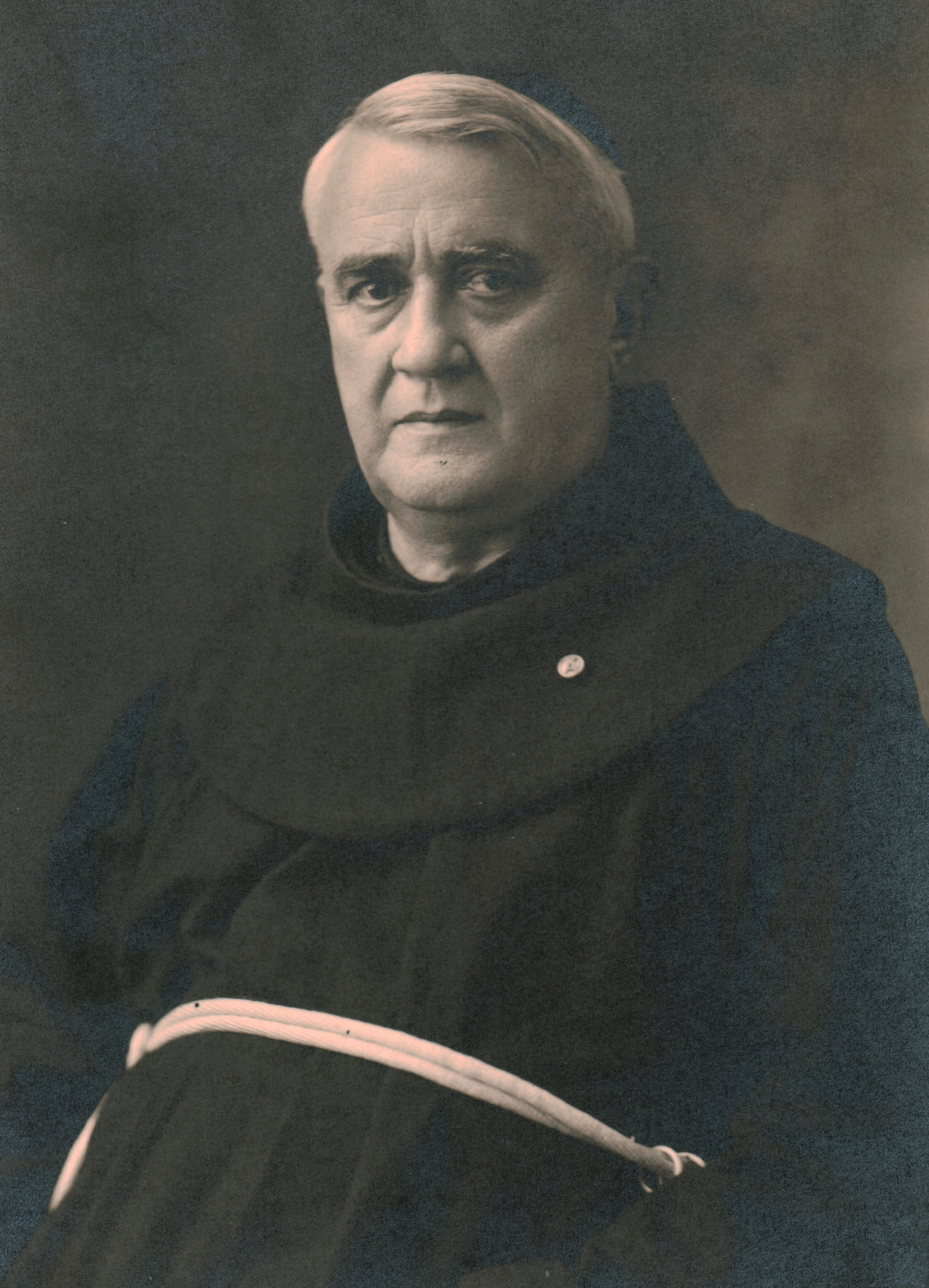
- Portrait of Gjergj Fishta, 1930s
- Born: 23 October 1871; Fishtë, Albania
- Died: 30 December 1940 (aged 69); Mirenë, Albania
- Education: Catholic theology
- Occupations: Educator; franciscan; poet; politician; rilindas; translator; writer

Gjergj Fishta (pronounced [ɟɛɾɟ ˈfiʃta]; 23 October 1871 – 30 December 1940) was an Albanian Franciscan friar, poet, educator, rilindas, politician, translator and writer. He is regarded as one of the most influential Albanian writers of the 20th century, particularly for his epic masterpiece Lahuta e Malcís, and as the editor of two of the most authoritative magazines after Albania's independence, Posta e Shqypniës and Hylli i Dritës.

Fishta was the chairman of the Congress of Manastir, which sanctioned the official Albanian alphabet, and he was part of the Albanian delegation to the Versailles Conference in 1919. In 1921, he was a member of the Albanian parliament and eventually became the deputy chairman. Later on, during the 1920s and the 1930s, he was among the most influential cultural and literary figures in Albania. After the Communist regime came to power, his literary oeuvre had been taken out of circulation until the fall of communism in the early 1990s. In recognition of his vast contributions to Albanian literature, he is also known as the "Albanian Homer".

== Biography ==
=== Early life and education ===
Fishta was born in 1871 as Zef Ndoka to a Catholic Albanian family in Fishtë, which is a village located in the Zadrima region. His parents were Ndok and Prenda Kaçi, and he was the youngest of three brothers and one sister. The parish priest of Troshan - Marian Pizzochini of Palmanova - asked Gjergj's parents to make him a friar. At the expense of the parishioner, Zef went to the Franciscan school in Shkodër until 1880, which is when Troshan's College began its activity. After completing his initial education in the Franciscan colleges of Troshan and Shkodër in 1886, Fishta was sent by the Franciscan Order to Bosnia, where he came into close contact with classical Latin and modern West European literary traditions.

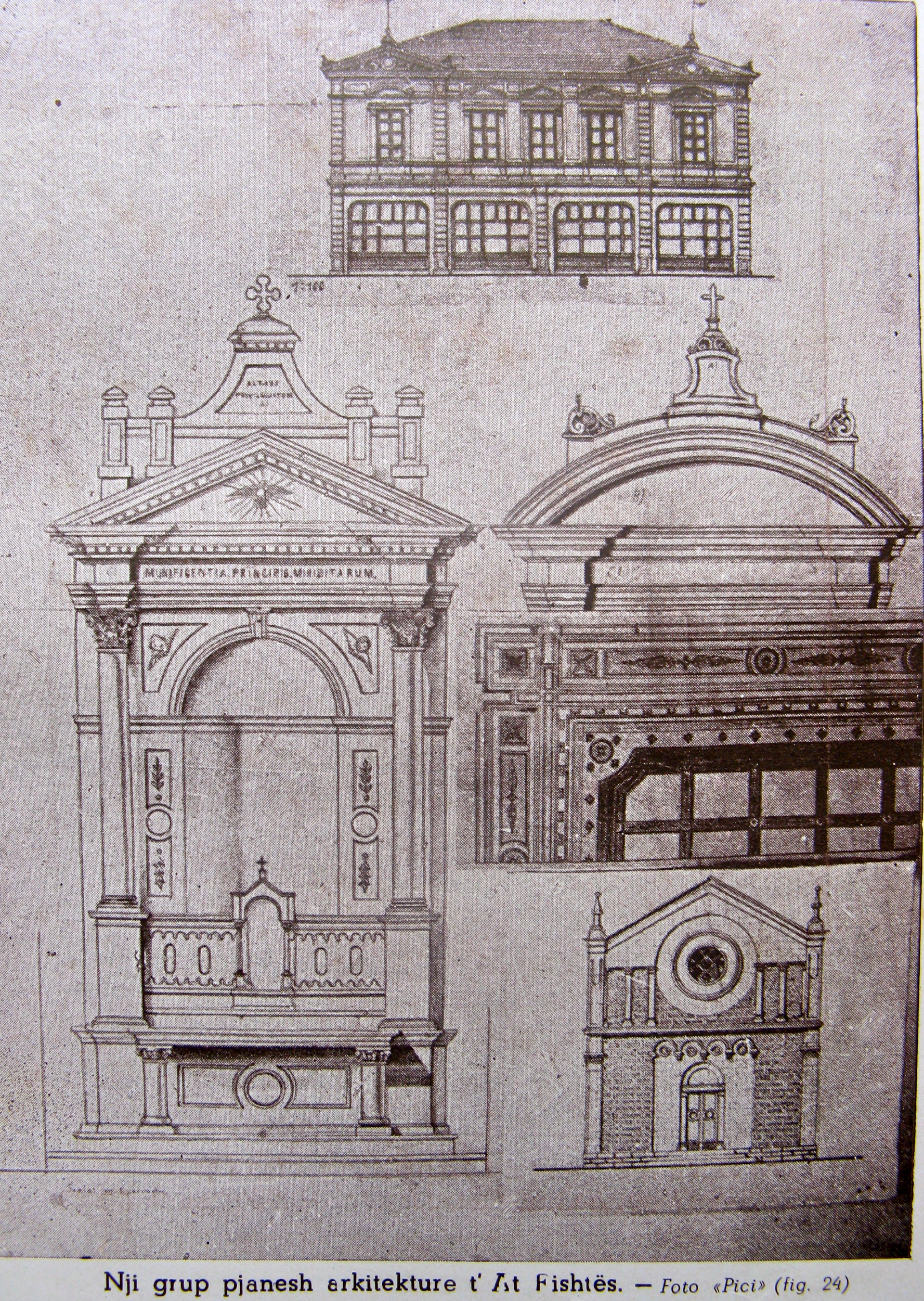
Architectural drawings created by Gjergj Fishta.

=== Early career ===
Fishta was ordained as a priest in 1894 and officially accepted into the Franciscan order under the name 'Gjergj Fishta'. He returned to Shkodër and began work as a parish priest in the village of Gomsiqe and as a teacher in the college of Troshan. In 1899, alongside well-known Albanian activists Preng Doçi and Ndre Mjeda, Fishta founded the cultural association Shoqnia e Bashkimit të Gjuhës Shqipe (Society for the Unity of the Albanian Language) in Shkodër, otherwise known as Bashkimi or Shoqnia Bashkimi. The association published Albanian-language books, notably a dictionary of the northern dialect of the Albanian language.

By 1902, Fishta became the director of every Franciscan school in northern Albania, and he replaced Italian with Albanian as the language of instruction. In 1907, Fishta founded the first Albanian public library in the city of Shkodër, alongside fellow Albanian activist Shtjefën Gjeçovi. As a representative of the Shoqnia Bashkimi, Fishta participated in the Congress of Manastir, which was held in the city of Manastir in 1908 with the intention of standardising the Albanian alphabet. Fishta was elected as the chairman of the committee, and although he praised the development of the Bashkimi alphabet, he declared that he had not arrived to defend any one of the alphabets; rather, he had come to unite with his countrymen and adopt the alphabet which the committee decided would be the most useful. Fishta's words deeply moved the audience, and Hoxha Ibrahim Efendi, a Muslim Albanian clergyman, rushed towards Fishta and embraced him with tears in his eyes.

After three successive days of discussion, the committee was unable to choose a single alphabet, and opted for the use of both the Bashkimi alphabet and Sami Frashëri's "Istanbul" alphabet, but with some changes to reduce the differences between the two. In response to those who were disappointed that the committee had chosen two written scripts rather than one, Fishta noted that German also had two written scripts, and after some discussion, the decision for the use of both the Bashkimi and Istanbul alphabets was accepted by all the delegates. Usage of the Istanbul alphabet declined rapidly and became obsolete over the following years as Albania declared its independence; in contrast, the Bashkimi alphabet functioned as the predecessor of the official alphabet of the Albanian language that is in use today.

=== Later career ===
In 1913, Fishta founded the monthly Hylli i Drites, one of the most important cultural periodicals in Albania prior to 1944, and during 1916–1919, he edited the biweekly Posta e Shqypnis (The herald of Albania) in Shkodër. In August 1919, Fishta served as the secretary-general of the Albanian delegation that attended the Paris Peace Conference, and he was later asked by the delegation's president Luigj Bumçi to join a special commission that was to be sent to the United States of America on behalf of the Albanian state. As part of the commission, Fishta visited Boston, New York and Washington.

In 1921, Fishta was elected to the Albanian parliament as a representative of Shkodër, and in August of that year was made vice president of the assembly. Fishta attended numerous Balkan conferences, such as in Athens in 1930, in Sofia in 1931, and in Bucharest in 1932. However, he eventually withdrew from public life and devoted his remaining years to his literary works as well as the Franciscan order, where he held the office of provincial of the Albanian Franciscans from 1935 to 1938. He spent the later years of his life in seclusion at the Franciscan monastery of Gjuhadol in Shkodër.

== Literary works ==
Lahuta e Malcís (The Highland Lute)
(opening and extract)

Help me, as then you helped, Oh God
Five hundred years the Turk has trod
Upon our fair Albanian lands,
Our people slaves under his hands,
Leaving our world in woe, in blood;
No chest can breathe, no flower bud;
Here not even the sun moves free,
Here all is evil that we see
And we must suffer silently,
Pitied by mice scrabbling for wheat;
Pitied by snakes beneath our feet.
...
These men whose God is gold alone
- I curse them for their hearts of stone -
Desire to take this wretched land,
Won by much Albanian blood, and
Make a jigsaw of its borders.
Why? Because Europe so orders...
Europe, you whore of the ages
Thus to stain your glorious pages;
This your culture: Albania starves
While faithless perjured Brussels carves
Her up to feed the whelps of Slavs.
Thus you pay them, who sacrificed
Themselves to save the lands of Christ.
Skanderbeg fought to save your world,
While you sat mute with banners furled.

— (Fishta, trans. Wilton)

Fishta authored 37 literary publications during his lifetime, and he was particularly notable for his work as a lyric and satirical poet. In the late Ottoman period, Fishta's publications included folk songs and a number of poems, which like other Albanian publications of the time often had to be published abroad and smuggled into the empire to avoid censorship.

Fishta's lyric verse is regarded to be his best; these works include the collections Vierrsha i perspirteshem t'kthyem shcyp ('Spiritual Verse Translated into Albanian', 1906); Mrizi i zâneve ('Noonday Rest of the Zanas', 1913); Vallja e Parrizit ('The Dance of Paradise', 1925), and the satirical volumes Anxat e Parnasit ('The Wasps of Parnassus', 1907) and Gomari i Babatasit ('Babatasi's Ass', 1923). The Wasps of Parnasus is a satirical work that critiqued the Albanians who placed individual interests over national ones and the intelligentsia who did not devote themselves to studying the Albanian language and showed disdain toward it. According to Arshi Pipa, Fishta's satirical works are modulated after the Bejte tradition of Shkodër, which he elevated to a literary level.

The literature of Shkodra produced by Catholic Albanian clergymen entered a golden age during the first decades of the 20th century, and this blossoming of Gheg Culture is largely credited to Fishta, who was universally recognised as Albania's national poet at the outbreak of World War II. Fishta also translated a number of literary works into Albanian, such as the Iliad.

=== The Highland Lute ===
Fishta's most notable work is The Highland Lute (Albanian: Lahuta e Malcís), a historical epic verse centred around the Albanian struggle for independence. The Highland Lute consists of 15,613 lines and covers the history of Albania (particularly in the north) from 1862 until 1913. Dedicated to the Albanian commander Ali Pashë Gucia, the work is an epic poem that consists of 30 cantos focusing on the events that precede and occur during the League of Prizren, which had become a symbol of the Albanian national awakening.

The story begins with skirmishes between Albanian highlanders from the Hoti tribe and the Montenegrins who had attacked them, capturing the heroic acts of figures such as Oso Kuka. The main section of the work consists of the cantos VI-XVV, which focuses on the League of Prizren between 1878 and 1880 and covers numerous battles, duels and folkloric elements. The final cantos focus on the Young Turk Revolution, the general uprisings in northern Albania, the Balkan Wars and the Albanian declaration of independence. According to Fishta himself, the hero of The Highland Lute is the Albanian nation.

The content and stylistic form of The Highland Lute were deeply inspired by the Albanian epic oral tradition that is depicted in the songs typically sung with the Çifteli or Lahutë. The Highland Lute uses the most common Albanian folk verse, the trochaic octameter, although it also uses the heptameter at different points, and the expressions and richness of the language used are very much in-line with the Albanian epic oral tradition. The most integral feature of the work that ties it to this epic tradition, however, is the idealisation of the heroic lifestyle of Albanian highlanders. Robert Elsie hypothesized that Fishta substituted the struggle against the Ottomans with a struggle against the Slavs, after the recent massacres and expulsions of Albanians by their Slavic neighbours.

The majority of The Highland Lute was composed between 1902 and 1909, but it was refined and amended by Fishta until the original 30 cantos were published in Shkodër in 1937 to mark the 25th anniversary of Albania's independence. The Highland Lute is the first major contribution to global literature written in the Albanian-language. It is arguably the most powerful epic poem written in Albanian in terms of its literary impact and the most successful in terms of public reception.

== Censorship ==
After the Communist regime came to power in Albania, Fishta's literature had been taken out of circulation. Fishta was perhaps denigrated more than any other pre-Communist writer, but this was not the result of the alleged pro-Italian or clerical sympathies. Rather, Fishta's censorship was the result of the pro-Slavic sympathies of the Albanian communists that were rooted in Yugoslavian involvement in their actual establishment, and his works were wrongfully labelled as "anti-Slavic propaganda". Fishta's censorship persisted until the fall of communism in the early 1990s.

== Legacy ==
"If they refuse to unite us in one state because they claim Albanians are Muslims, then we Christians will melt down our crosses to forge bullets to defend our Muslim brothers."

Gjergj Fishta’s legacy is that of a priest and poet who forged an Albanian national identity through language, culture, and unity, transcending religious divides to elevate Albanian consciousness and dignity. Fishta's talent as an orator served him well as a political figure and as a member of the clergy.

=== Awards in his lifetime ===
In the last years of the Ottoman rule over Albania, proposed by the wali of Shkodër Hasan Riza Pasha he was awarded with the Maarif Order of 2nd class (tr. Maarif Nişanı, Order of Education) for his contribution in the local education. He was awarded with the Order of Franz Joseph from Austro-Hungarian Empire authorities, later on in 1925 with the Medaglia di Benemerenza by the Holy See. On 1931 by the Order of the Phoenix by Greece, and after the Italian invasion of Albania he was part of the Royal Academy of Italy.

== Honours and awards ==
In Albania:

- National Flag Order (posthumous)

From other countries:

- Second Class of the Order of Education (Ottoman Empire, 1912)
- Knight of the Order of Franz Joseph (Austrian Empire)
- Medaglia di Benemerenza (Holy See, 1925)
- Commander of the Order of the Phoenix (Kingdom of Greece, 1931)

== Bibliography ==
- Lahuta e Malcís, epic poem, (Zara, 1902)
- Anzat e Parnasit, satire, (Sarajevo, 1907)
- Pika voese republished afterwards and retitled Vallja e Parrizit, (Zara, 1909)
- Shqiptari i qytetnuem, melodrama, (1911)
- Vëllaznia apo Shën Françesku i Assisi-t, (1912)
- Juda Makabe, tragedy, (1914)
- Gomari i Babatasit, (Shkodër, 1923)
- Mrizi i Zanave, (Shkodër, 1924)
- Lahuta e Malcís (2d. ed.), Gesamtdruck, (Shkodër 1937). In English The Highland Lute, trans. by Robert Elsie and Janice Mathie-Heck. I. B. Tauris (2006) ISBN 1-84511-118-4

== Sources ==
- Maximilian Lambertz: Gjergj Fishta und das albanische Heldenepos "Lahuta e Malsisë" – Laute des Hochlandes. Eine Einführung in die albanische Sagenwelt. Leipzig 1949.
