= Krajnë =

- Village
- Location within Albania
- Coordinates: 41°54′41″N 19°40′26″E
- Country: Albania
- County: Lezhë
- Municipality: Lezhë
- Administrative unit: Blinisht
- Time zone: UTC+1 (CET)
  - Summer (DST): UTC+2 (CEST)

Krajnë is a village in the Lezhë County, northwestern Albania. At the 2015 local government reform, it became part of the municipality of Lezhë. It is part of the Zadrimë region.
