= Gramsh, Lezhë =

Gramsh
- Village
- Location within Albania
- Coordinates: 41°54′14″N 19°34′18″E
- Country: Albania
- County: Lezhë
- Municipality: Lezhë
- Administrative unit: Dajç
- Time zone: UTC+1 (CET)
  - Summer (DST): UTC+2 (CEST)
- Postal Code: 4506

Gramsh is a settlement in the Lezhë County, northwestern Albania. It was part of the former municipality Dajç. At the 2015 local government reform it became part of the municipality Lezhë. It is part of the Zadrimë region.
