= Fishtë =

- Village
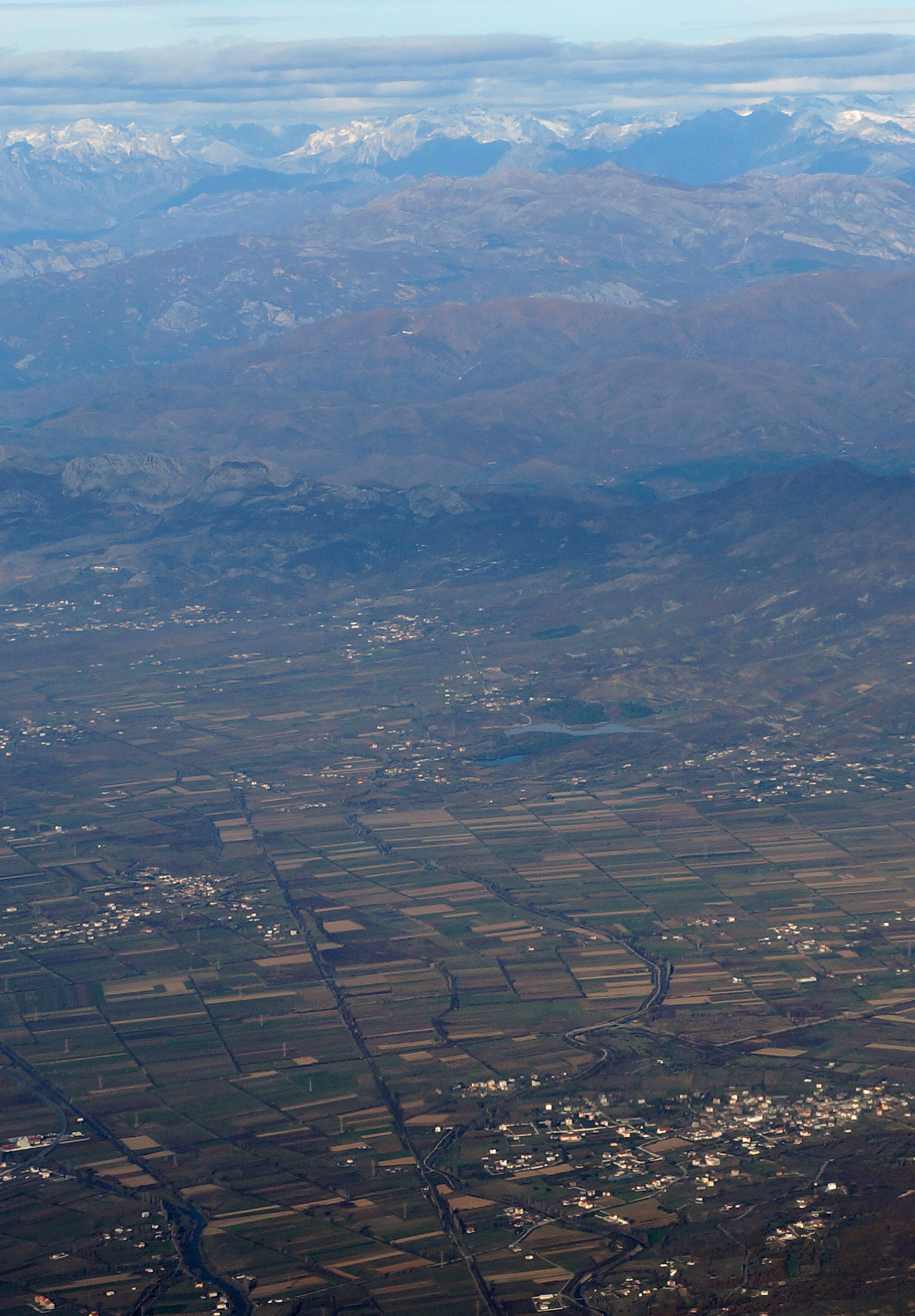
- View of Fishtë from the air

- Location within Albania
- Coordinates: 41°53′42″N 19°40′16″E
- Country: Albania
- County: Lezhë
- Municipality: Lezhë
- Administrative unit: Blinisht
- Time zone: UTC+1 (CET)
  - Summer (DST): UTC+2 (CEST)

Fishtë is a settlement in the former Blinisht municipality, in Lezhë County, northwestern Albania. At the 2015 local government reform it became part of the municipality Lezhë. It is part of the Zadrimë region. It is an important agritourism area with a number of well established slow food restaurants.

== Notable people ==
- Gjergj Fishta, Albanian national poet
