= Hajmel =

- Administrative unit
- Location within Albania
- Coordinates: 41°57′N 19°38′E
- Country: Albania
- County: Shkodër
- Municipality: Vau i Dejës
  - Administrative unit: 30.6 km^{2} (11.8 sq mi)

Population (2011)
  - Administrative unit: 4,430
  - Administrative unit density: 145/km^{2} (375/sq mi)
- Time zone: UTC+1 (CET)
  - Summer (DST): UTC+2 (CEST)

Hajmel is a village and a former municipality in the Shkodër County, northwestern Albania. At the 2015 local government reform it became a subdivision of the municipality Vau i Dejës. The population at the 2011 census was 4,430. It is part of the Zadrimë region.

== Settlements ==
There are 5 settlements within Hajmel.

1. Dheu i Lehtë
2. Hajmel
3. Nënshat
4. Paçram
5. Pistull
