= Kodhel =

Kodheli
- Village
- Kodheli nga tubi i fermes

- Location within Albania
- Coordinates: 41°54′N 19°37′E
- Country: Albania
- County: Lezhë
- Municipality: Lezhë
- Administrative unit: Blinisht
- Time zone: UTC+1 (CET)
  - Summer (DST): UTC+2 (CEST)

Kodheli is a small village located in the center of Zadrima plain in the Lezhë County, northwestern Albania. At the 2015 local government reform it became part of the municipality Lezhë. It is part of the Zadrimë region.

Kodheli is located between the city of Lezhë to the south and Shkoder to the north in a distance of 14 km from the first and 20 km from the second. It has in majority an agricultural-based economy. The village has a primary school (form 1st grade to the 4th). After the 4th grade, children go to the next village Blinisht, not far from Kodheli to continue further grades. Furthermore, in the village there is the Catholic Church of 'Shen Rroku' and there is also a small medical center.

Kisha e Shen Rrokut

The Church was built from the Italian priest Don Antonio Sciarra, who came to Albania in 1992 right after the fall of the communist regime. His contribution to the village and to the all region was more than great. He helped the people of the village by giving them tools, clothes and many other things. In addition, he contributed to the reforestation of some areas.

== History ==
=== In general ===
People of the region are called Zadrimor, from its field name Zadrima, stretching from Shkoder to Lezhë. The region has a very rich cultural tradition. It has withstood the 500 years of Ottoman invasion, saving its Cristian religion of Catholicism.

On August 16 is the village's holiday of Shen Rroku, celebrated vigorously with many visits, church mass, prayers and numerous activities.

=== Name etymology ===
The name 'Kodhel' comes from the name 'kudher', anvil in English. This is the main version, although, there are more versions of the name's origin. Many years ago, the village was much larger than it is today and it was located at the upper side of the hill. In the village center, there is a place called 'Farka' which means 'kudher'. This fact proves that Kodheli long ago was a village with a large population and the existence of a blacksmith shop for forging tools, was necessary. According to some legends, the old village comprised around 300-400 houses, which may have a population of about 2000–3000 people, having in mind that there were large families with more than 60–70 members. About 300 years ago, a great disease killed almost the entire population; the survivors moved to the current location of the village.
