= Vranjina =

Village in Zeta, Montenegro

- Village
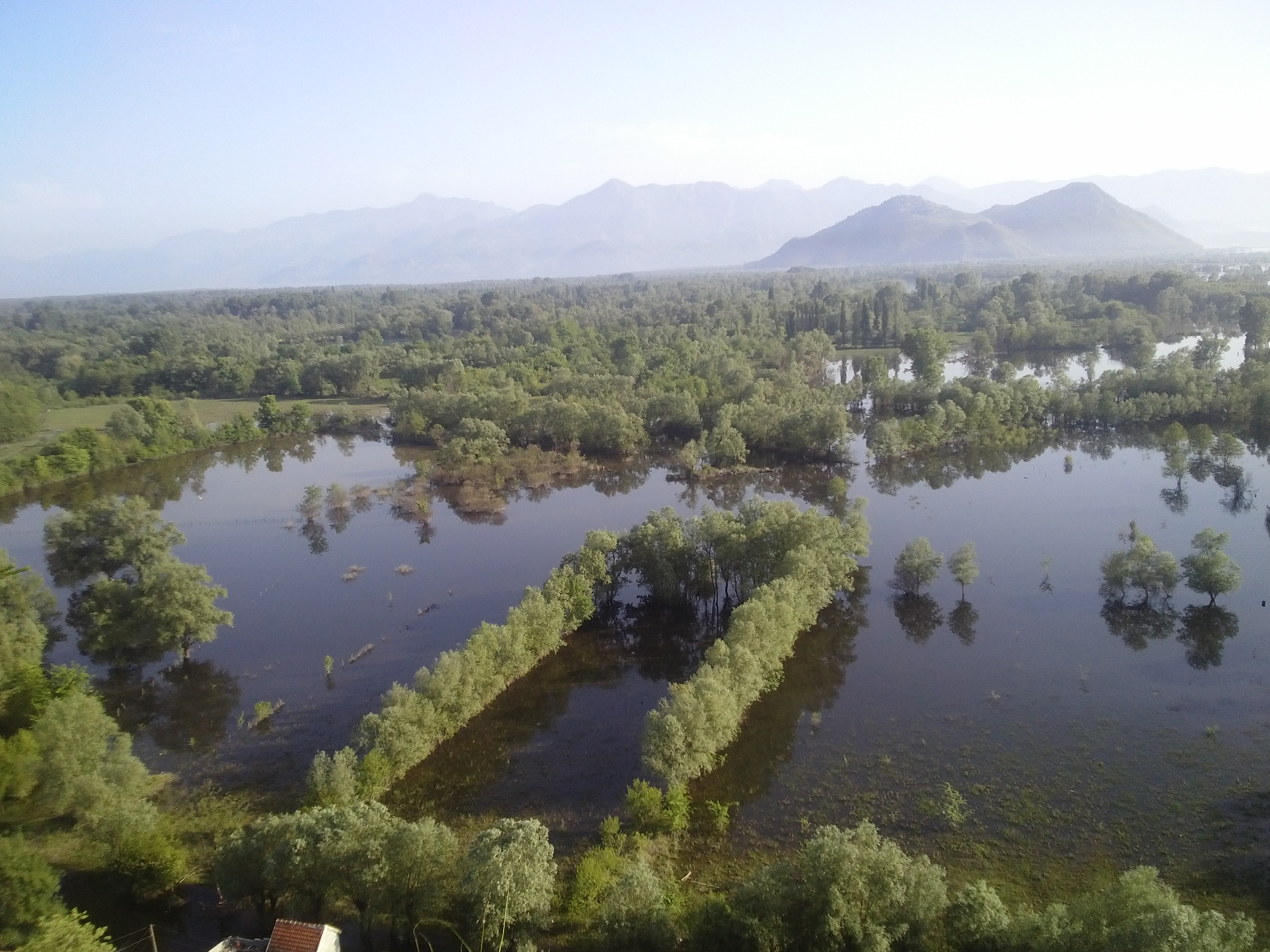
- Vranjina, view from Žabljak Crnojevića

- Location within Montenegro
- Coordinates: 42°16′42″N 19°08′05″E
- Country: Montenegro
- Municipality: Zeta

Population (2011)
  - Total: 209
- Time zone: UTC+1 (CET)
  - Summer (DST): UTC+2 (CEST)

Vranjina
Native name: Врањина
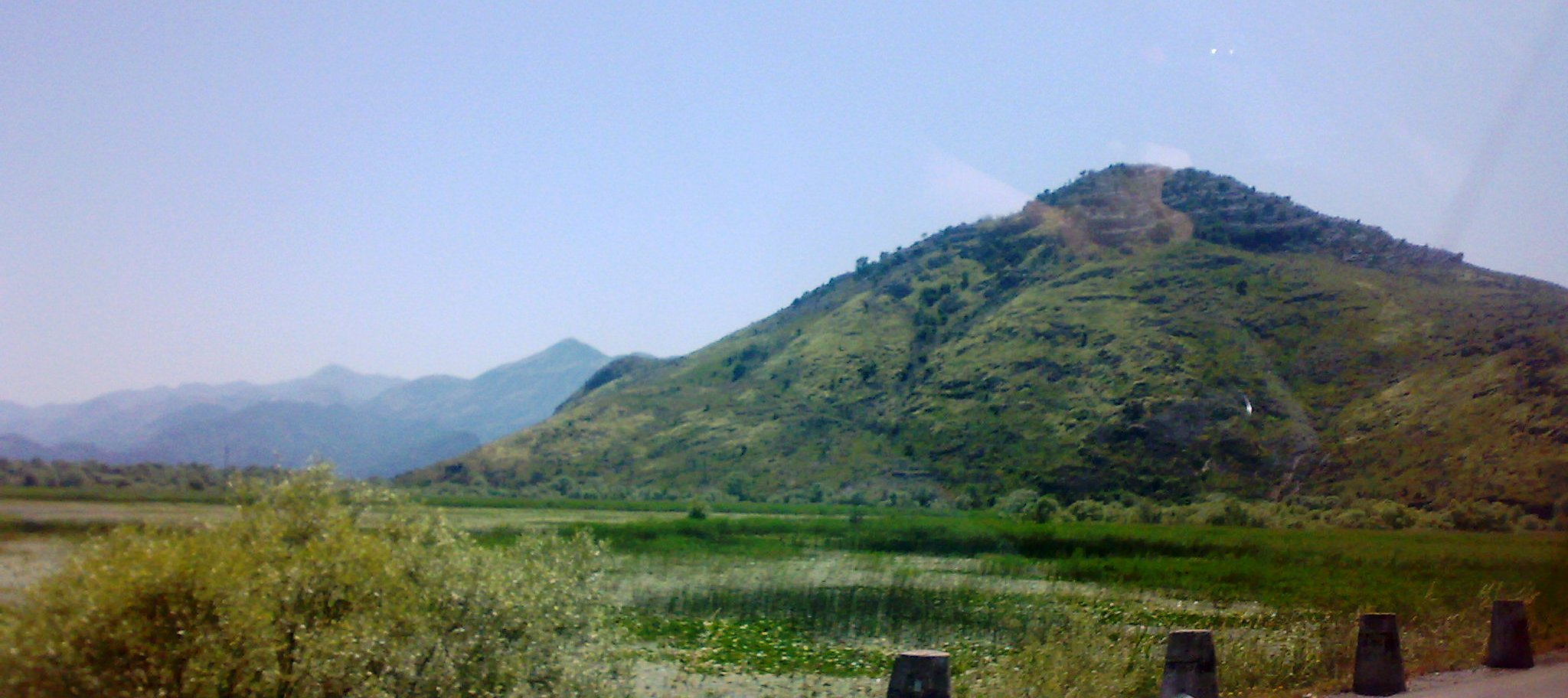
- Interactive map of Vranjina

Geography
- Location: Lake Skadar
- Coordinates: 42.274°N 19.136°E
- Length: 1 km (0.6 mi)
- Width: 2 km (1.2 mi)
- Highest elevation: 330 m (1080 ft)

Administration
- Montenegro

Demographics
- Population: 209 (2011)

Vranjina (Montenegrin: Врањина) is a settlement, island, and a hill in Lake Skadar, in the Zeta Municipality of Montenegro.

Until the first half of the 18th century, Vranjina like other islands of Skadar lake, was one of the hills in the Zeta–Skadar lowlands.

== Geography ==
Created by a delta of the Morača River, the island is in the northern part of the lake. It has an area of 4.6 km^{2} and its highest point is at 296 meters, making it the highest island in Montenegro. The island is connected to the mainland by a bridge, towards Podgorica, and a causeway, across the lake towards Bar.

== History ==
Vranjina Monastery is a well-known feature of the island. According to the legend, the island had different name before the monastery has been built. When Ilarion Šišojević, the first metropolitan bishop of the Zetan Orthodox Metropolitanate, started the construction of the monastery he decided that the island will be named after the first bird he noticed. It turned out to be a crow (Montenegrin: Врана).

=== Town ===
Vranjina town, on the shores of the Skadar lake, is called the Montenegrin Venice because of its natural setting. It is a popular fishing spot. Several fish restaurants located on the island include Plantaže restaurant.

Notable local landmarks include the so-called "house of Oso Kuka", named after an Ottoman border guard of Albanian descent who died on the island in a fight against Montenegrin forces in 1862. This was known as the Battle of Vranjina.

== Demographics ==
According to the 2011 census, its population was 209.

Ethnicity in 2011
Ethnicity	Number	Percentage
Montenegrins	159	76.1%
Serbs	46	22%
undeclared	14	6.7%
Total	209	100%

Language in 2011
Language	Number	Percentage
Montenegrin	115	55%
Serbian	93	44.5%
undeclared	1	0.5%
Total	209	100%
