= Zojs =

- Village
- Location within Albania
- Coordinates: 41°53′20″N 19°34′37″E
- Country: Albania
- County: Lezhë
- Municipality: Lezhë
- Administrative unit: Dajç
- Time zone: UTC+1 (CET)
  - Summer (DST): UTC+2 (CEST)
- Postal Code: 4506

Zojs (also Zojz, Albanian definite form: Zojsi or Zojzi) is a settlement in the Lezhë County, northwestern Albania in Zadrima region. It was part of the former municipality Dajç. At the 2015 local government reform it became part of the municipality Lezhë. It is part of the Zadrimë region.
