= Blinisht, Lezhë =

Blinisht
- Administrative unit
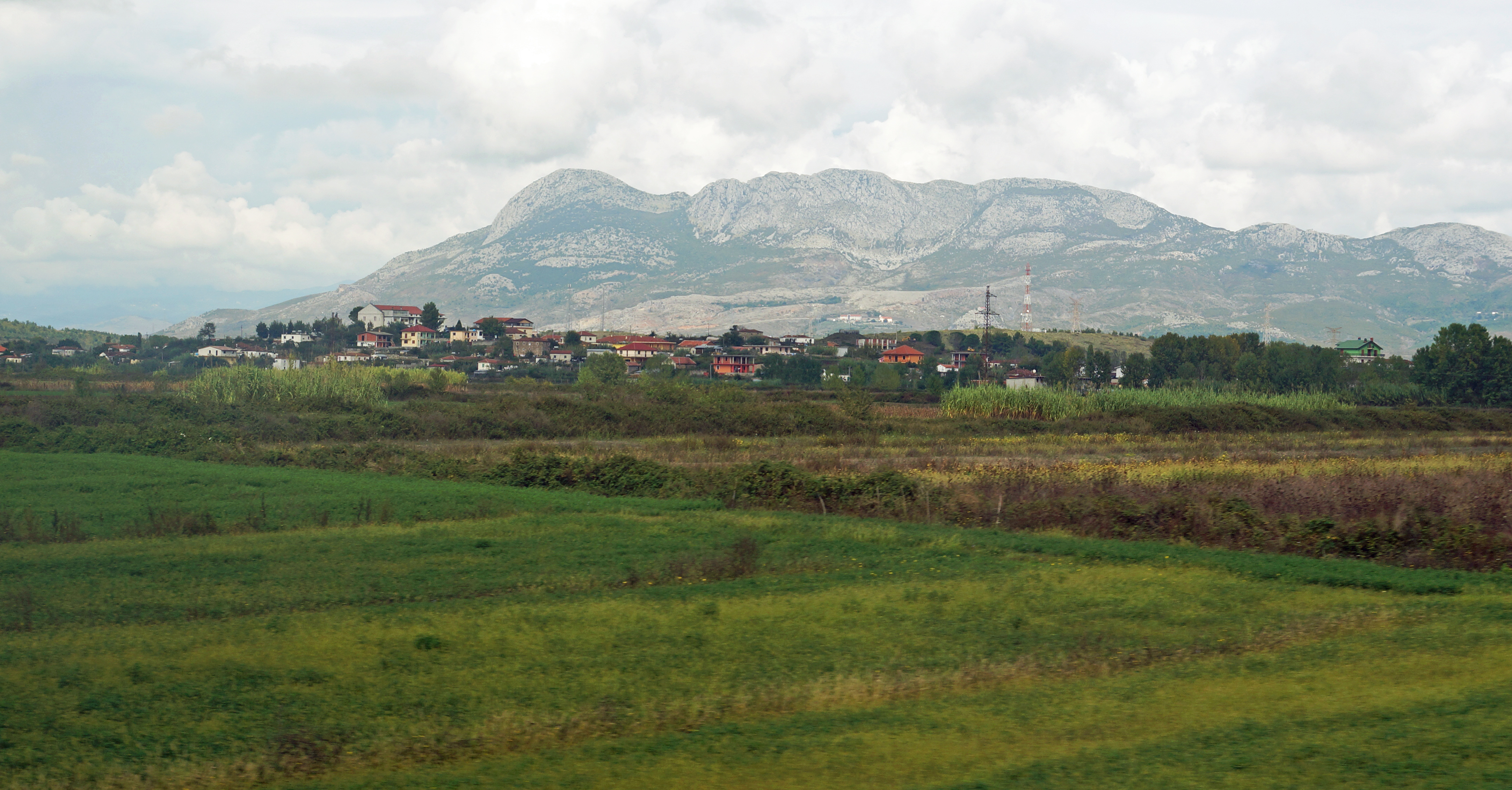
- The village of Blinisht with the Shita mountain in the background

- Location within Albania
- Coordinates: 41°53′N 19°38′E
- Country: Albania
- County: Lezhë
- Municipality: Lezhë

Population (2023)
  - Administrative unit: 1,878
- Time zone: UTC+1 (CET)
  - Summer (DST): UTC+2 (CEST)

Blinisht is a village and a former municipality in Lezhë County, northwestern Albania. At the 2015 local government reform it became a subdivision of the municipality Lezhë. The population at the 2023 census was 1,878.

Blinisht is located in the Zadrima region and the municipal unit includes 7 settlements:

- Baqel
- Blinisht
- Fishtë
- Kodhel
- Krajnë
- Piraj
- Troshani

== History ==
The region has been subordinate both the Roman Catholic Diocese of Lezhë and Roman Catholic Diocese of Sapë.

== Landmarks ==
- St. Stephen's Church, Blinisht, Medieval church

== People ==
- Pjetër Zarishi (1806-1866), Albanian catholic priest and poet
