= Zadrima =

Ethnographic region in northwestern Albania

Coordinates: 41.9211°N 19.5828°E

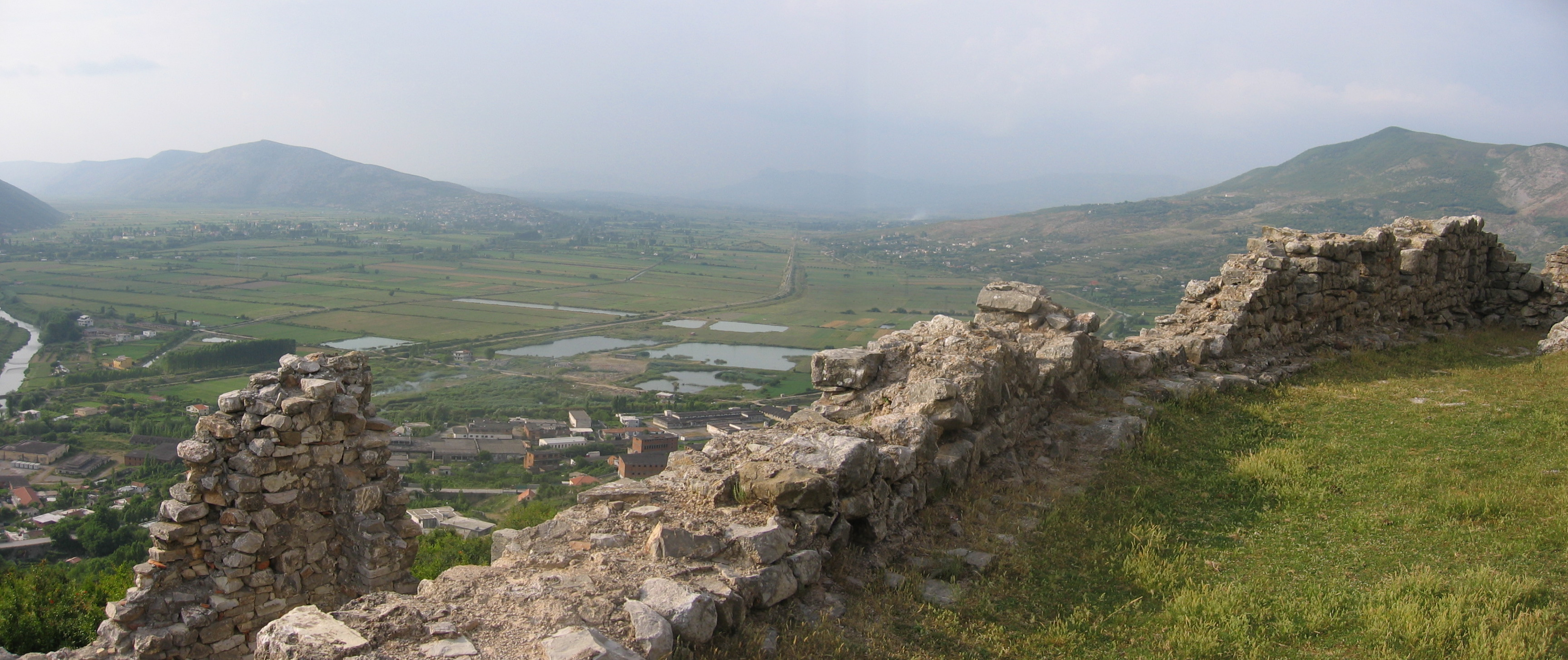
View of the Zadrima Plain

Zadrima is an ethnographic region situated in north-western Albania between the cities of Shkodra and Lezha, located left of the Lower Drin which eventually drains into the Adriatic Sea from near Lezha.

== Geography ==
The Zadrima Plain includes villages and settlements administratively split between the modern Shkodra (Vau i Dejës Municipality) and Lezha (Lezhë Municipality) counties. The following belong under the Vau i Dejës Municipality:

- Laç
- Kovaç
- Vau i Dejës
- Mjeda
- Shelqet
- Stajk
- Naraç
- Kaç
- Shkjezë
- Pistull
- Paçram
- Kukël
- Plezhë
- Hajmel
- Dheu i Lehtë
- Nënshat

While the settlements below come under the Lezhë Municipality:

- Krajnë
- Fishtë
- Troshan
- Baqël
- Blinisht
- Kodhel
- Dajç
- Kotërr
- Dragushë
- Mabë
- Gramsh
- Zojs
- Gjadër
- Piraj

At the end of the eighteenth century, Zadrima came to also encompass the nearby villages of Vjerdha, Lisna, Gajtani, and Rragami. The settlements of the former Guri i Zi Municipality, located to the immediate north of Zadrima, are traditionally connected to Zadrima due to similarities in traditions, customs, and folk clothing. On the other hand, the villages of Kallmet i Vogël, Kallmet i Madh, and Rraboshta, which are a part of the southern Zadrima Plain, differ in their customs and traditions from the rest of the greater region. Zadrima can be further broken down into three main units: 1) The area bordering Mirdita, consisting of villages located on the foothills of the mountains separating the two major ethnographic regions (e.g., Troshan, Fishtë, Nënshat); 2) The villages established on the slopes of hills and mountains located within the core territory of Zadrima (e.g., Paçram, Pistull, Dajç); 3) The villages located on the open plains of Zadrima (e.g., Gramsh, Shelqet, Gjadër).

== History ==
Zadrima is first recorded in the twelfth century by Byzantine princess and historian Anna Komnene, who refers to the region as highly agricultural and the place of many battles between the Western and Eastern Roman empires. In 1281 the progenitor of the Dukagjini family, dux Gjin Tanushi (Ducam Ginium Tanuschium Albanensem), is recorded as ruling over portions of Zadrima, Guri i Zi (Montagne noire), Pulti, Sati, and lands around the Fan. Much of Zadrima and the adjacent territories between Lezha and the Fan would consequently be inherited by the Dukagjini, particularly the branch descending from Tanush II Dukagjini. Other than the Dukagjini, the noble families of the Blinishti and Zaharia also held lands in Zadrima. The Blinishti of the thirteenth and fourteenth centuries initially held the lands between Gjadër in the west and Mali i Shejtit to the east, Arst in the north and Ndërfanda in the south, with their centre in Blinisht. In the fifteenth century it is recorded that Koja Zaharia had received lordship over Sapa and Dagnum from the papacy following his conversion to Roman Catholicism from Serbian Orthodoxy in 1414. The Zaharia would continue to rule over much of Zadrima during the medieval and often came into land disputes and conflicts with the Dukagjini whose influence had been primarily limited to Lezha and its environs. Zadrima and Lezha would eventually fall under Venetian occupation.

The demographic history of Zadrima is one of heterogeneity and diversity in regards to geographic origins. The old population of the region, descended from the medieval inhabitants and communities of Zadrima, has largely diminished and represents a negligible percentage of modern families. For example, in the seventeenth century only a handful of native households remained in the village of Mjeda, such as that of Lazër Mati Koja, who descended from the old Zaharia family through Koja's son, Leka. The Ottoman occupation of the region resulted in mass depopulation and movement out of Zadrima, explaining the great reduction in the region's native population. From the sixteenth and seventeenth centuries onwards, Zadrima would come to be repopulated by a number of families and brotherhoods arriving from Malësia. Examples include a number of the brotherhoods from Gjatore, a quarter in Kallmet, whose ancestors arrived from Vukël in Kelmend, as well as the Lazër-Ilaj of Pistull who are believed to have come from Hoti. Numerous families from Mirdita and Puka also settled in Zadrima due to their close proximity to the region, which offered better living conditions due to its lowland terrain. Migrations from other nearby territories would also take place, examples including the Imeraj of Paçram who descend from the Çelaj of Bushat and the Ranxa of Pistull who arrived from Melgushë.

== See also ==
- Mirditë
- Malësia

== Sources ==
- Brunga, Liza (2021). Kishat e Zadrimës deri në prag të kuvendit të Arbërit (Thesis) (in Albanian). Academy of Albanological Studies (Academy of Sciences of Albania).
- Coli, Evaristo (2019). Gjenealogjia e fiseve - Kallmet, Rraboshtë dhe Mërqi [Genealogy of tribes – Kallmet, Rraboshtë and Mërqi] (in Albanian). Lezhë: Gjergj Fishta. Archived from the original on 19 April 2022.
- Loka, Nikollë (2022). Blinishtët e Mirditës në Historinë Mesjetare (in Albanian).
- Malaj, Edmond (2017). "The Dukagjini Family During the Middle Age. Geographic Extension of the Lands and some Features". Studia Albanica. 1.
