= The Highland Lute =

1937 poem by Gjergj Fishta

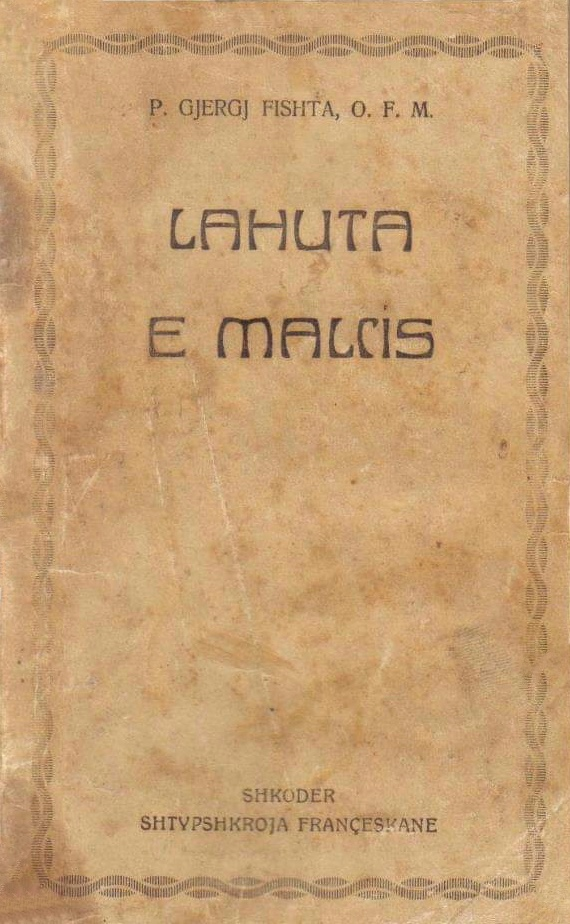
Lahuta e Malcís (1937) book cover

The Highland Lute (Albanian: Lahuta e Malcís, original and standard language of the time based on Gheg Albanian) is the Albanian national epic poem, completed and published by the Albanian friar and poet Gjergj Fishta in 1937. It consists of 30 songs and over 17,000 verses.

The Lahuta e Malcís was heavily inspired by northern Albanian oral verse composed by the traditional cycle of epic songs and by the cycles of historical verse of the 18th century. It contains elements of Albanian mythology and south Slavic literary influences: Fishta was influenced by Croatian Franciscan friars as a student in monasteries in Austria-Hungary. In the poem the struggle against the Ottoman Empire became secondary and as a central theme substituted with fighting Slavs (Serbs and Montenegrins), whom he saw as more harmful after the recent massacres and expulsions of Albanians by them. The work was banned in Yugoslavia and Communist Albania due to anti-Slavic rhetoric. The work was described as "chauvinist" and "anti-Slavic" in the Great Soviet Encyclopaedia (1950), while Fishta was called "a spy who called for a fight against Slavs".

The English translation of The Highland Lute was published in 2005 by Canadian Albanologists Robert Elsie and Janice Mathie-Heck (ISBN 978-1845111182).

== Analysis ==
The Highland Lute has about 17,000 verses and has been called by many Albanian scholars as the Albanian "Iliad". The book does however lack a genuine central subject around events, circumstances, characters, and imaginations. If there is a "hero" in the book it is the Albanian people. The stories described create together an Albanian persona which would be the anonymous hero. The content also differs from Girolamo de Rada's "Unfortunate Skanderbeg" and Naim Frashëri's "History of Skanderbeg". In the Lahuta e Malcis, the destiny of Albania lies in the mythological symbol "Time of Albania", and according to Albanian folklore, around this time, tribes, banners, lands, clocks, houses and highland warriors, were all united for a cause. Together this creates a charming ensemble of characters, mythological or not, as they convey the message of survival of the Albanian and his nation, even though it is filled with tragedy. The unity of the work directly affects the craft, and the mythology, including fairies, dragons, lizards, and shadows. The poems have a time span of two generations, beginning in 1858 when Montenegro, driven by the Russian Pan-Slavism, seeks to invade Albanian territory. The poem ends when the Albanian independence is proclaimed and the London Conference has decided to split the territories in half awarding lands to Serbia and Montenegro. Fishta seeks to group some songs, according to the historical chronology of events resulting in several cycles of songs. The reader is temporarily detached from real historical events and then transported to fantastic realms. The cycle begins with "Oso Kuka", continuing with the song of "Dervish Pasha", and the "Berlin Assembly". The last two songs create the atmosphere developmental of Albanian national identity. The next cycle begins with the Albanian Prizren league and the only central character is Marko Miljanov, (described as Mark Milani in Albanian) who is the anatagonist in both Kosovar folklore and amongst the highlanders in Malësia e Madhe. Alongside Miljanov, King Nicolas Petrovic hastily appears. The cycle is then structured into sub-cycles, and the first begins with Çun Mula, a tribal chieftain from the Hoti tribe. Following the exhibition of the song "Kulshedra" (dragon) comes the five-song sub-cycle that brings massive scenes. The following cycle is centered around Tringa before and after death. The events, after another thirty-year break, follows the uprisings of independence. The final song, "London Conference", is instead the epilogue of the poem.

Various scholars have attempted to find clashes between "Lahuta of the Highlands" and Homer's "The Iliad", especially in the atmosphere by the two poems. They have compared characters that have common traits, event scenes, etc. Their conclusion was that the Homeric poem, with the exception of the distant model on which the poet was based, shared the Balkan affiliation with the Fishtian poem. The main conflict in the poem, between the Albanians and the Slavs, between the two nations is justified as a natural conflict, of genesis, in the famous proverbial verse "we have lost friends". However, the poet calls for avoiding the inevitable fatality "God in heaven and on earth But always our brother and sister". However the events are extremely tense giving the Highland Lute the form of dramatically original epic from other nations’ epics with mostly less intense story telling. There is a pathological hatred between the two sides, not only among humans, but also between the relevant mythological beings, between nature, natural phenomena, and so on. This makes it impossible for the spirit of either side to rest or to cease to fight. In the Highland Lute, the hatred between the enemy camps is the contagious plasma of the poem. It puts together the clusters of characters. The poem travels between fantasy and reality clustering both imaginary and real characters. Both sides have undisputed right to all territories, events, to fight, to make peace, etc. The heavenly reality is no more than the reality of everyday life and no more terrestrial than imagined and fantasized in a mountainous, all-natural familiarity among the two groups. Albania's time establishes a completely human, almost parental, relationship with Ali Pasha of Gucia when the moment is played with the fate of the nation. The great fairy is the poet's life-long sister, giving him courage and the spirit to follow the development of events, such as poems and curses. Likewise, other clocks, by tribal names or other clans by mountain names. The typical familiarity of this nature is created in the guest song "Zana" known for its rare artistic values. The poet seeks to put the historical characters of the work in the binomial with the mythological characters.

Usually, these are examples of each other. The features of one party are reflected in the other. The beauty and nobility of Tringa are reflected Visitor's Fairy and vice versa. At the end of the fighting, the alien remains captured in Tringa's tomb, taking revenge on his Albanian sister. Natures dualism is described as the two groups, or sides, fighting each other. The symbolic center of the development of events, as the opinion of scholars affirms, is Shkodra. However it does not fall into religionism. He, as Professor Egerem Cabej says, uses the unit of the tribe to give the unit of the nation. In the tribe are marked the traits of the nation and of the race. This gives the Highland Lute a national and universal dimension. The verse with which the poem was built is the quadruple of popular poetry of the historical epic of the north. Fishta manages to bring in this verse with dozens of characters, each of them completely individualized, with unique traits that cannot be removed from the reader's memory. He also individualizes dozens of battles, and scenes, painted with its own special colors to be distinguished from the myriad surrounding it. Fishta's dictionary, much of which has never been used in literary works, much less in poetry, with words of obscure meaning, archaisms, solecisms, and composite words, often constructed by him according to bovine sources, success in creating not only visual but also auditory images.

The rhymes are some of the most essential phenomena of the poem expressing the poets video-emotional attitude. Rhymes are often overlapping, alternating or as a cross-over. The rhymes are also multilayered, depending on the place where small or large breaks are made in reading, where in syntactic terms the sentences or sentences end in sentences. Fishta uses in his own way repetitions at the beginning, middle or end of the verse, refrains, repetitions of full texts, quotations from folklore masterpieces, inverted word order, and so on. There are also rapid dialogues, philosophical sentiments, vows, prayers, wishes, curses, blasphemies, interruptions and rhetorical questions creating variety for the reader. The rhythm of expression of artistic expression of reading is strongly determined by the figuration. Hyperbole is the main tool of the epiphany, but a hyperbole both fantastic and realistic. Fantastic for magnifying feature size or feature effect, realistic for their concreteness. Characteristic is the comparison, especially the lengthy comparison, often complicated with some comparisons and more in its composition, which possesses whole song lyrics. Also, the metaphors are used with originality with multiple folklore subtitles. Unrepeatable in the poem is the use of euphemisms with artistic effects, sometimes caressing, worshiping, and praising, at times suing, harsh and macabre. Euphemism functions instead of the names of gods, mythological beings, but also of the main characters of the historical grouping. The epithet always has metaphorical loads, it participates in comparisons or hyperbole. Animation and personification, like dense prosopopoeia (personification), are the most effective tools of Fishtian balance between the terrestrial reality, down to the most intimate and concrete terrestrial plane. Some of the poem's most perfect songs like "Kulshedra", "Sutjeska Bridge", "Guest Fairy" etc. are a staggering manifestation of all kinds of stylistic figures.

== See also ==
- Albanian folk beliefs
- Albanian folk poetry
- Albanian Songs of the Frontier Warriors
