= Hodo Sokoli =

Albanian military commander (1836–1883)

Hodo Pashë Sokoli
- Born: 4 January 1836; Shkodër, Ottoman Empire, present day Albania
- Died: 1883; Erzincan, Ottoman Empire, present day Turkey
- Occupation: Military commander
- Parent: Mahmud beg Sokoli (Father)

Hodo Pashë Sokoli or Hodo Dervishi (1836–1883) was an Ottoman Albanian miralay and later one of the leaders of the League of Prizren. He defected from the Ottoman army, when the Ottoman Empire decided to cede the part of Albanian-populated area of Malësia to the Principality of Montenegro and led troops of the League of Prizren against the Montenegrin army.

== Life ==
Was born in Shkodër in 1836 by the name Et'hem Hodo, to a notable family, son of Mahmud beg Sokoli. The origins of his family was from the village of Dervishej. In 1860 he became commander of the border guards of the lake of Shkodër under Abdi Çerkezi. In 1868 he was promoted to the rank of colonel (bey) and served as the commander of gendarmerie of Shkodër. In April 1880 he became the leader of a League of Prizren committee that opposed the annexation the Albanian-populated areas of Gruda, Hoti, Plava and Gucia to the Principality of Montenegro. Sokoli led 8,000 volunteer troops from Shkodër and Tuzi to defend these areas, which eventually were not ceded to the Principality of Montenegro.

During his chairmanship of an assembly of the League of Prizren on April 17, 1880, attended by 150 Albanian officers of the Ottoman Empire, Sokoli publicly removed his insignia and uniform. Sokoli's decision to forgo his Ottoman military uniform in favour of the Albanian national costume distinguished this symbolic act. In December 1880 the Ottoman general Dervish Pasha captured Sokoli, who was detained in Istanbul, the capital of the empire, and later executed in Erzincan, in 1883.
