= Bushat =

- Administrative unit
- Location within Albania
- Coordinates: 41°58′N 19°32′E
- Country: Albania
- County: Shkodër
- Municipality: Vau i Dejës
  - Administrative unit: 92.7 km^{2} (35.8 sq mi)

Population (2011)
  - Administrative unit: 14,149
  - Administrative unit density: 153/km^{2} (395/sq mi)
- Time zone: UTC+1 (CET)
  - Summer (DST): UTC+2 (CEST)
- Website: www.komunabushat.al

Bushat is a village and a former municipality in the Shkodër County, northwestern Albania. At the 2015 local government reform it became a subdivision of the municipality Vau i Dejës. The population at the 2011 census was 14,149.

== Geography ==
Bushat is located in Zadrima, a fertile plain between Adriatic Sea, Shkodër and Mirditë, through which Drin river. Just east of the village Drin finds its way between two hills. The village lies at the eastern foot of Zefjana (249 m above sea level), the higher of these two hills. The archaeological site of an ancient Illyrian city is found on the Zadrima plain, just north of the present-day village of Bushat.

== Population ==
The Municipality of Bushat has a population of 14,149 (2011 census). An average household consists of four members. 20.37 percent of the population is under 14 years old, 65.48 percent between 15 and 64 years old and 14.15 percent older than 65 years. The proportion of women in the population is slightly higher than that of men. The population at the 2011 census was 14,149. The population of area is known for its traditions and culture.
