= Vau i Dejës =

Albanian town and municipality

- Municipality
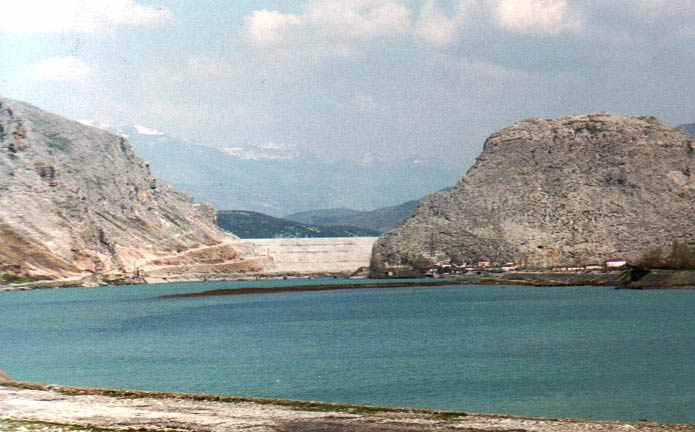
- Dam of Vau i Dejës

- Emblem

- Location within Albania
- Coordinates: 42°0′N 19°38′E
- Country: Albania
- County: Shkodër

Government
  - Mayor: Kristian Shkreli (PS)

Area
  - Municipality: 499.35 km^{2} (192.80 sq mi)
  - Administrative unit: 31 km^{2} (12 sq mi)
- Elevation: 25 m (82 ft)

Population (2011)
  - Municipality: 30,438
  - Municipality density: 60.955/km^{2} (157.87/sq mi)
  - Administrative unit: 8,117
  - Administrative unit density: 260/km^{2} (680/sq mi)
- Time zone: UTC+1 (CET)
  - Summer (DST): UTC+2 (CEST)
- Postal Code: 4008
- Area Code: (0)261
- Website: www.vaudejes.gov.al

Vau i Dejës (Albanian pronunciation: [ˌvau i ˈdɛjəs]; 'Deja's Ford') is a town and a municipality in Shkodër County, northwestern Albania. It was formed at the 2015 local government reform by the merger of the former municipalities Bushat, Hajmel, Shllak, Temal, Vau i Dejës, and Vig-Mnelë, that became municipal units. The seat of the municipality is the town Vau i Dejës. The total population is 30,438 (2011 census), in a total area of 499.35 km^{2}. The population of the former municipality at the 2011 census was 8,117.

Vau i Dejës (or Vau Dejës or Vau-Dejës) also refers to the city center for the municipality, which is sometimes referred to as Laç or Laç-Vau i Dejës. Located in the northern region of Zadrima, Vau i Dejës is intersected by the Drin and Gjadër rivers. It is also strategically about 41 kilometres from the Adriatic Sea. Settlements in the area can be dated back to the 15th century, while the main city of Vau i Dejës was developed to house workers during the construction of the Vau i Dejës hydroelectric dam from 1971- 73. After the completion of the dam, families displaced from the floodwaters began to inhabit the city. Today Vau i Dejës is composed of 8 villages and a city center. The population in 2008 was 12,345. The municipality covers a total of 31 km and is composed of 1 city center and 8 villages. The villages of Vau i Dejës are Mjedë, Spathar, Shelqet, Kacë, Narac, Dush, Gomsiqe and Karmë. It is the seat of the Roman Catholic Diocese of Sapë.

== History ==
The history of Vau i Dejës dates back to the old city center Deja (also known as Danja), established around the year 1127. Deja, an Albanian medieval town, was built at the point where the Drin River leaves the highlands. Deja was a strategic area because it was the crossing point of ancient roads connecting the east and the west. From Lissus, an old Roman road travelled through Nenshat and Hajmel, passing through Laç at the "Stone Pass" and continuing on to Gomsiqe and Pukë. The city was a customs point for merchant caravans passing through.

From the early thirteenth century, the feudal lords remained under Serbian rule. It was attacked during the Mongol invasion of 1242. Here was enacted Zaharia feudal family. After the formation of the principality of Balsha, Deja became part of it. In 1396, George Balsha II passed the city to Republic of Venice. In the years 1423–1443, Deja passed twice over to the Ottomans in 1443 to be released after the general anti-Ottoman insurrection. Possession of Deja was contested between feudal lords Lekë Zaharia and Nicholas Dukagjini in 1445. After the assassination of the latter, the city was returned by his mother to Venice. Skanderbeg claimed the area to be delivered to League of Lezhë, which caused the fight between Albanians and Venetians. Skanderbeg besieged the fortress in 1447-1448 but did not succeed in taking it. The city remained under Venice until 1479 when the Ottomans recaptured it.

The ruins of St. Mark's castle and the church, which dates back to the early 15th century, are still present today. According to historians, each year in this area a big fair was organized and attended by the inhabitants of the Zadrima region. This fair took place on the 25th of April and continued late hours of the morning. Agricultural goods, livestock and primitive tools that could not be found any other day of the year were available for sale.

=== Danja Castle ===
The Danja Castle, located in the Deja village, was a prominent center in the Zadrima region. The biggest battle in the war against Venice was fought at Danja Castle and is where Leke Zaharia was killed. He is buried in Saint Maria Church in Vau i Dejës, which has been rebuilt from when it was destroyed in 1965. With the death of Lekë Zaharia, the castle was taken by Venice, which left after military pressure from Gjergj Kastrioti - Skenderbeg. After the Danja Castle fell, a great part of the population left for Italy (see Arbëresh people).

== Geography ==
Vau i Dejës lies along the national road connecting Shkodra to Kosovo. Located at the foot of a mountainous woodland, it is situated at the exit of a gorge between the hill of Laç with an elevation 367 m and Boka with an elevation 464 m. Through this gorge flows the Glina brook which divides the city's urban area into two visible parts until it meets the Gjadër River. The vegetation of these hills is dry largely because their geological composition does not favor the growth of vegetation.

=== Geology ===
The rocks of the eastern and northern territory of Vau i Dejës are characterized by formations of karst and flysch magmatic rocks similar to those found in Mirdita. The moderately strong rocks are mostly composed of flysch from Krasta with small amounts of siliceous clay from the volcanic-sedimentary series from the Mirdita area. Soils of these areas are not cohesively related, while the gravel brook of Gomsiqe is characterized by small stones and very little clay.

Geo-dynamic processes of this area are caused by tectonic movement along the Mirdita and Krasta-Cukal region. Tectonic parting is less developed. Landslides are common in the flysch formations. Massive landslides have been identified along the Vau i Dejës - Koman highway, especially in the area of Karma. Surface erosion is common along the Gomsiqe brook as it flows into the Vau i Dejës Lake. Rockslides have been observed in the vicinity of the Gomsiqe bridge and the Karma school.

The rock formations of the southern and western parts of the municipality may be divided into two groups by their complex rock properties and water-permeability. The first group contains alluvial deposits, alevrite, sand, QH-QPH grit. These compounds have a high to medium level of water permeability. The second group contains compact rocks with permeability ranging from divided into three groups. The first sub of carbonate rocks contains to CR2, J3 J3-CRL and featuring a high permeability. The second subgroup contains ultrabasic rocks and volcanic sedimentary featuring a non-uniform medium permeability. The third subgroup contains rocks with low to virtually no permeability and contains limestone, shale, clay and alevrolite content as well as the paleocene flysch-Neocene (pgl-2) and mastrikcianit (Crm2-PG2).

Water relief in this area ranges from 150 to 300 L/hour. Underground aquifers surface from exploits in the ultra basic flysch rocks. The southern part of the area has plentiful water containing hydrocarbons and hydrocarbons, sometimes calcium and calcium-magnesium and Mp = 398 mg/L; fp = 13.6 ° k, Ph = 2.72. This water meets the hydrochemical parameters for use for drinking. Productive horizon for water supply in case of need is the old bed of the Drin river.

=== Hydrography ===
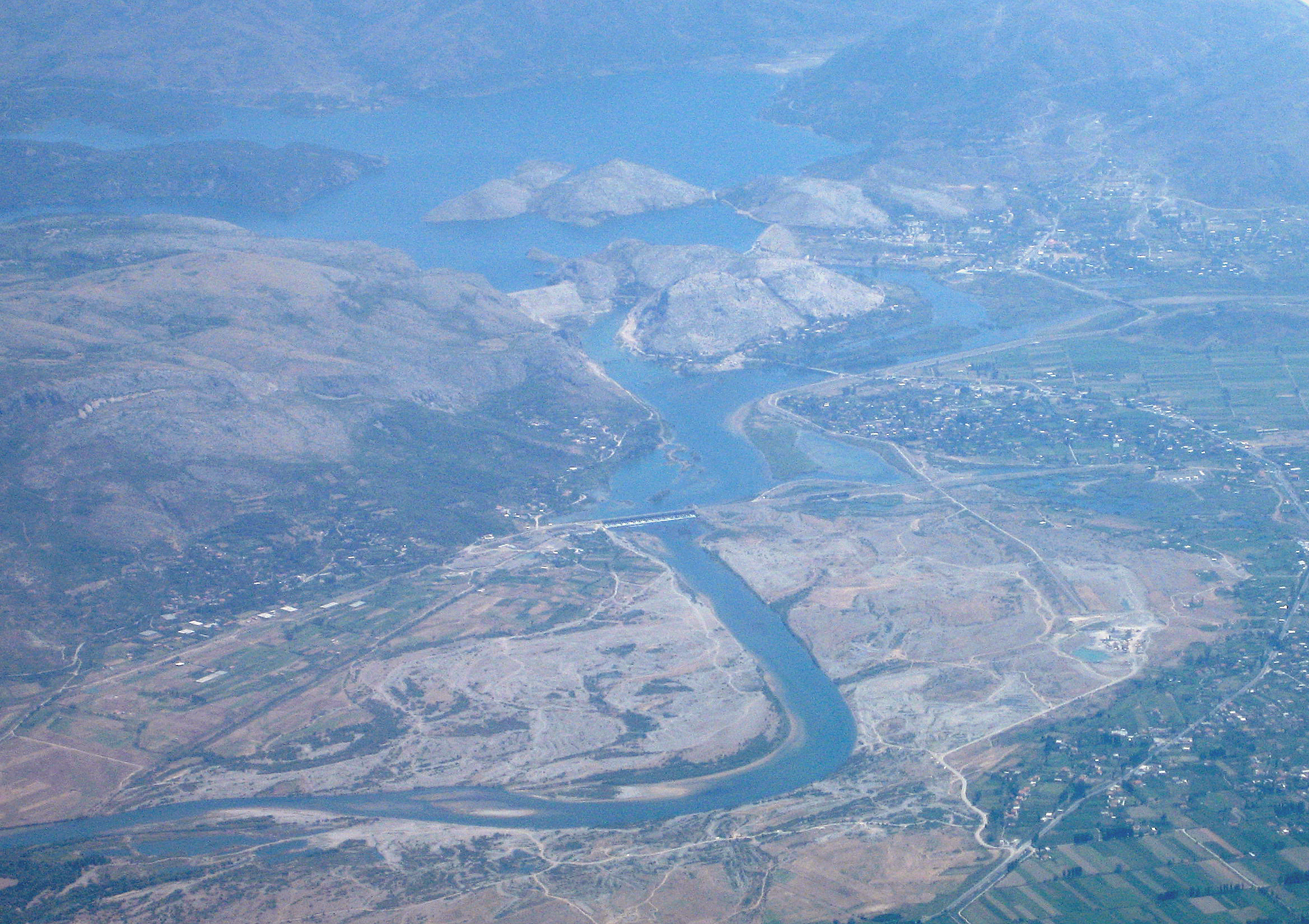
The Drin river and Vau i Dejës Lake

The hydrographic network is represented by an artificial lake (Vau i Dejës Lake), Drin River and several streams, the most important being the Gomsiqe brook and the Zazlli brook. All these flow from the mountain of Gomsiqe. Vau i Dejës Lake has an area of 26 km^{2}, while the water surface is 25 km^{2}. Its depth ranges up to 50m. The volume of water for 75 m above sea level is 600 million m^{3}. The average level above sea level is 75m. Maximum level above sea level is 76m. The volume of usage is 220 million m^{3}. The length of the lake 10 km while its width is 1.2 km.

In the southern part of the city, the urban structure is intersected by the Glina brook, which separates the neighborhood named "Kapedani" from the rest of the city. This is a short stream that emanates from the hills to the east of the territory and flows into the Gjadër River. During the winter season, the brook's water flow increases considerably during periods of heavy rainfall and the southwestern part of the city is threatened by flooding.

==== Drin River ====
Originally, Drin flowed southwest from the gorge of Vau i Dejës where it joined the Gjadër River 1.5 km below, in the field of Zadrima. It passed Lezhë and emptied into the Adriatic, in the Drin Bay. In 1846, the Drin river formed a new branch that ran towards Shkodra and joined the Buna River. The Drin river was divided into two parts, one flowing southwest towards Lezhë, and the other flowing towards Shkodra. This caused a disruption to the water system of Lake Shkodër, impacting on water levels and the flow of the Buna river, which became the river with the greatest water capacity.

==== Gjadër River ====
Since its separation from Drin in the South-West town of Laç (Qyrsaç), the river heads south. Gjadër River itself is a branch of Drin. There are many characteristics of river torrential. The surface of its watershed is mountainous relief 199m2. The average altitude is 422m above sea level. The average amount of precipitation falling in the pond is about 1900mm per year.

=== Climate ===
Climate data for Vau i Dejës
Month	Jan	Feb	Mar	Apr	May	Jun	Jul	Aug	Sep	Oct	Nov	Dec	Year
Record high °C (°F)	20 (68)	21 (70)	24 (75)	27 (81)	34 (93)	39 (102)	45 (113)	44 (111)	36 (97)	31 (88)	26 (79)	22 (72)	45 (113)
Mean daily maximum °C (°F)	9 (48)	11 (52)	15 (59)	19 (66)	24 (75)	28 (82)	32 (90)	32 (90)	27 (81)	21 (70)	15 (59)	11 (52)	20.3 (68.5)
Mean daily minimum °C (°F)	1 (34)	3 (37)	6 (43)	9 (48)	13 (55)	17 (63)	20 (68)	20 (68)	16 (61)	11 (52)	7 (45)	3 (37)	10.5 (50.9)
Record low °C (°F)	−14 (7)	−12 (10)	−7 (19)	−4 (25)	−1 (30)	7 (45)	10 (50)	9 (48)	1 (34)	−1 (30)	−6 (21)	−10 (14)	−14 (7)
Average precipitation mm (inches)	191 (7.5)	168 (6.6)	160 (6.3)	144 (5.7)	90 (3.5)	64 (2.5)	38 (1.5)	66 (2.6)	122 (4.8)	166 (6.5)	240 (9.4)	213 (8.4)	1,662 (65.4)
Source: weather.com

== Culture ==
=== Cultural Center ===
Cultural Center for Children in Vau i Dejës was founded in 1995. Reconstruction of the Cultural Center in 2006 was funded by KFV Germanic Bank. The objectives of the Cultural Center are:

- Educating the next generation of culture, our history and folklore.
- Preservation of cultural heritage.
- Revival of social and cultural life.
- Knowledge and instruction musical instruments new generation.
- Knowledge and instruction of games and dances.
- Knowledge to folk costumes.

=== Sports ===
There are not any public sport organizations in the municipality. The only recreational facilities are two privately owned football fields and a Judo training facility. In the future, the municipality has plans to establish its own football team and create recreational spaces.

==== Judo ====
The first official presentation of Judo in Albania was made in 1993 in Vau i Dejës by Anton Shkoza. Judoists were trained in the Cultural Center from 1993 until 1997. In 1997, Anton was able to build a small gym in his home until a proper gym was constructed in 2010. There are 3 Judo groups that train in Vau i Dejës and belong to the Federation of Judo Albania – (Vau-Dejësi, Vllaznia, and Klub Judo "Anton Shkoza"). Judoists from Vau i Dejës have competed in various youth tournaments in Kosovo and Montenegro, the World Cup in Rome, the German Super cup, European Championships in Belgrade, Tournament of Italy and Niksic as well as various other international competitions. In 2008, Edmond Topalli of Vau i Dejës represented Albania in the Beijing Olympics. He lost his first match to João Neto of Portugal. His other notable achievements include a bronze and silver medal at the Tournament of Tuscany.

=== Points of Interest ===
==== Island of Shurdhah ====
The medieval ruins of Shurdhah (also known as Vau i Dejës Castle) lie 35 km east of Shkodra along the Koman road. Once strategically guarding the Shkodra-Kosovo road, leading up the valley to Prizren, Sarda was founded in the 6th-8th century BC. Much of the ancient town is submerged in the artificial lake created by the Vau i Dejës hydroelectric dam. The ruins of an 11th-century medieval castle, which includes two rings of defensive walls and towers (some sadly submerged in the lake), the remains of a Byzantine church and other early medieval walls, are still visible above the waters. The setting on the steep rocks rising from the lake is especially impressive.

==== Vau i Dejës Lake ====
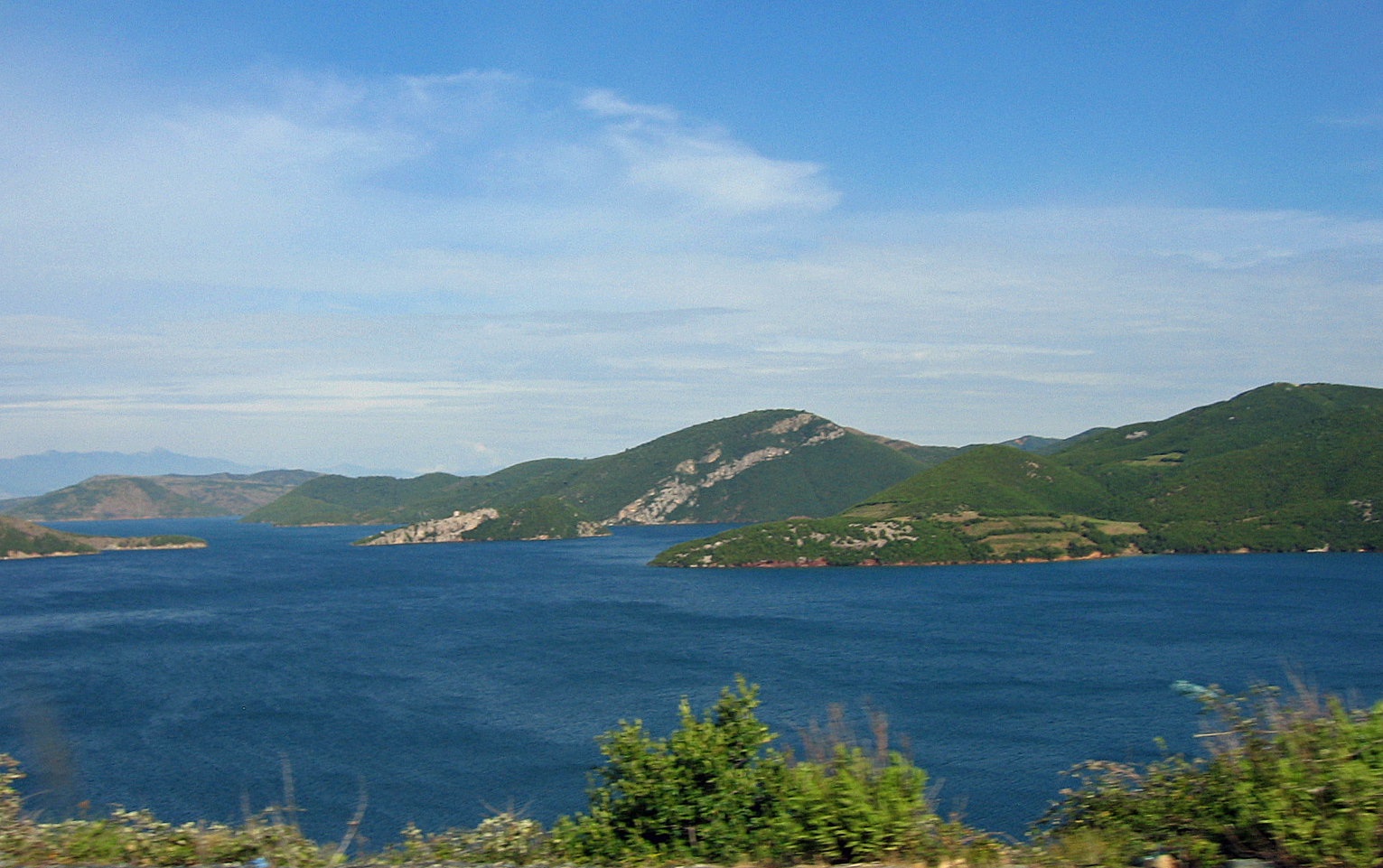
Lake of Vau i Dejës with Shurdhah Island, Albania

Vau i Dejës Lake is an artificial lake formed by the Vau i Dejës hydroelectric dam. Some sites along the lake include Ragam, the island of Shurdah (or Sarda), and the Cave of Doves. Much of the lake is undeveloped but there are a few bars and restaurants along the lake. "Qafa e Gurit" (English: Stone Passage) is the local access point to the lake.

== Economy ==
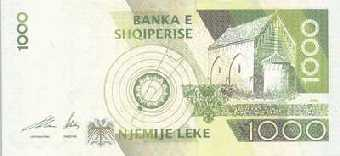
Church of Vau i Dejes is depicted on the back of the 1000 Lek banknote, issued in 1997.

Under communism, the main employers were the state operated hydro electric power plant and copper factory as well as agricultural cooperatives. Currently, economic development is based on small private economic activities such as services and commerce positioned along the Shkodër-Pukë national road. There are 105 private business currently registered in the Vau i Dejës. Most of the private business are small bar/cafes and small grocery stories. Other commercial activities include, a photo studio, bakery, light industrial supplies, dentistry, and various other basic services.

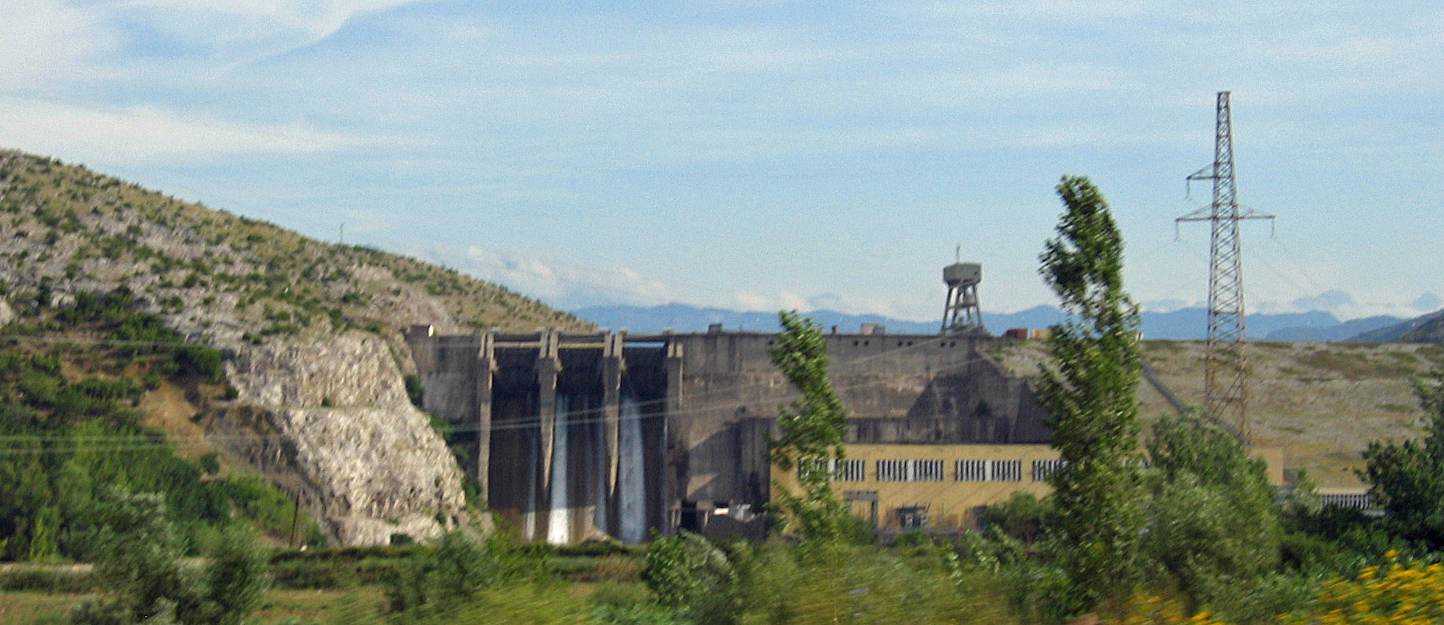
Vau i Dejës Hydroelectric Power Station

In the villages outside of the city center, there are small production, processing, agriculture and stock breeding activities. Due to agricultural and land fragmentation caused by the privatization of state property in 1990, the municipal administration has no data on agricultural land being cultivated or the number of agricultural business in operation. The main agricultural products are crops and fodder for farming. Currently, the municipality has 1.141 ha of agricultural land with different productive capacity.

After the privatization of land, livestock number increased within the municipality. Estimates from 2006 place the number of livestock at 1,350 and the number of cattle at 7,345. There are also eight dairy farms using local stock breeding products. The products are sold locally and in Shkodër. There currently, is not a specific place for the collection, processing, and trading of agricultural products.

== Demographics ==
As noted in the table below, populations in several of the outlying villages such as Dush, Gomsiqe, and Karmë are dwindling due to lack of utilities, services, and accessibility. The displaced residents are being relocated within the Laç-Vau i Dejës settlement. Out of the whole municipality, 1,202 residents are from 0–6 years old, 2,943 are 7–18 years old, 6468 are from 19 to 64 years old, and 3,052 are over 65 years old. Thirty four percent of the municipality is under the age of 18 and 53% of the population is of working age.

Village	1994	1995	1996	1997	1998	1999	2000	2001	2002	2003	2004	2005	2006
Laç - Vau i Dejës							5,836	5,631	5,647	5,627	5,659	5,458	5,503
Dejë							479	542	495	494	508	486	492
Mjedë	1,746	1,737	1,748	1,753	1,785	1,801	1,811	1,912	1,944	1,970	1,933	2,062	2,085
Spathar	410	365	369	369	382	381	381	379	388	422	387	415	425
Shelqet	1,049	1,029	1,003	1,002	1,010	1,008	1,009	1,049	1,049	1,094	1,048	1,135	1,142
Kacë	878	897	905	898	904	913	909	936	949	970	941	1,012	1,019
Narac	1072	1024	887	895	879	868	867	882	885	840	881	869	957
Dush	905	609	341	328	307	319	322	311	313	295	312	175	175
Gomsiqe			222	225	221	237	244	238	232	221	237	204	194
Karmë	610	526	403	399	402	388	392	385	394	345	387	327	322

== Law and Government ==
=== Strategic Development Plan ===
In 2008, Vau i Dejës developed a 6-year Strategic Development Plan in cooperation with experts from Intercooperation Albania and Co-PLAN, Institute for Habitat Development. The Strategic Development Plan can be read here.

==== General Development Objectives ====
- Economic Development

Economic development of the Municipality of Vau i Dejës focusing on the revitalization of small industrial production, agricultural development and livestock in western and southern areas of the territory of the Municipality, promotion of small enterprise focused on service and trade sector as creating an attractive environment for foreign investors

- Territorial management

Improvement and consolidation of spatial structure of the city of Vau i Dejës as major urban centers in this Municipality, as well as urban areas to villages Mjedë, Kacë, and territories in Narac field, carefully addressing functional transformations in Shkodër - Pukë main road.

- Infrastructure and services

Enhance the quality of public services and physical and social infrastructure throughout the territory of the Municipality of Vau i Dejës and mainly in the area of the city and villages Mjedë, Kacë and Narac, while responding to community needs and quality standards to the quality of life.

- Local Government Improvement

Increased management and administrative capacity of local government in the Municipality of Vau i Dejës addressing civic issues and reflect them in local politics effectively.

- Financial Resources

Increased revenue from taxes and fees in Vau i Dejës Municipality and enable funding to improve infrastructure and services across the administrative territory of the Municipality.

== Education ==
The municipal unit of Vau i Dejës has 5 kindergartens with 205 students, 9 elementary schools with 1,700 students and 2 high schools with 416 students. School attendance is an issue with only 40% of school age children attending school. Education standards are sub par due to poor and crowded facilities. There is also a lack of didactic material, especially laboratories. Class size is often twice the desired density with 45 - 50 students per classroom.
