= Todhri script =

18th-century Albanian alphabetical writing system

Todhri 𐗢𐗚𐗈𐗝𐗒
- Script type: alphabet
- Period: 18th century
- Direction: Left to right
- Languages: Albanian

ISO 15924
- ISO 15924: Todr (229), Todhri

Unicode
- Unicode alias: Todhri
- Unicode range: U+105C0–U+105FF

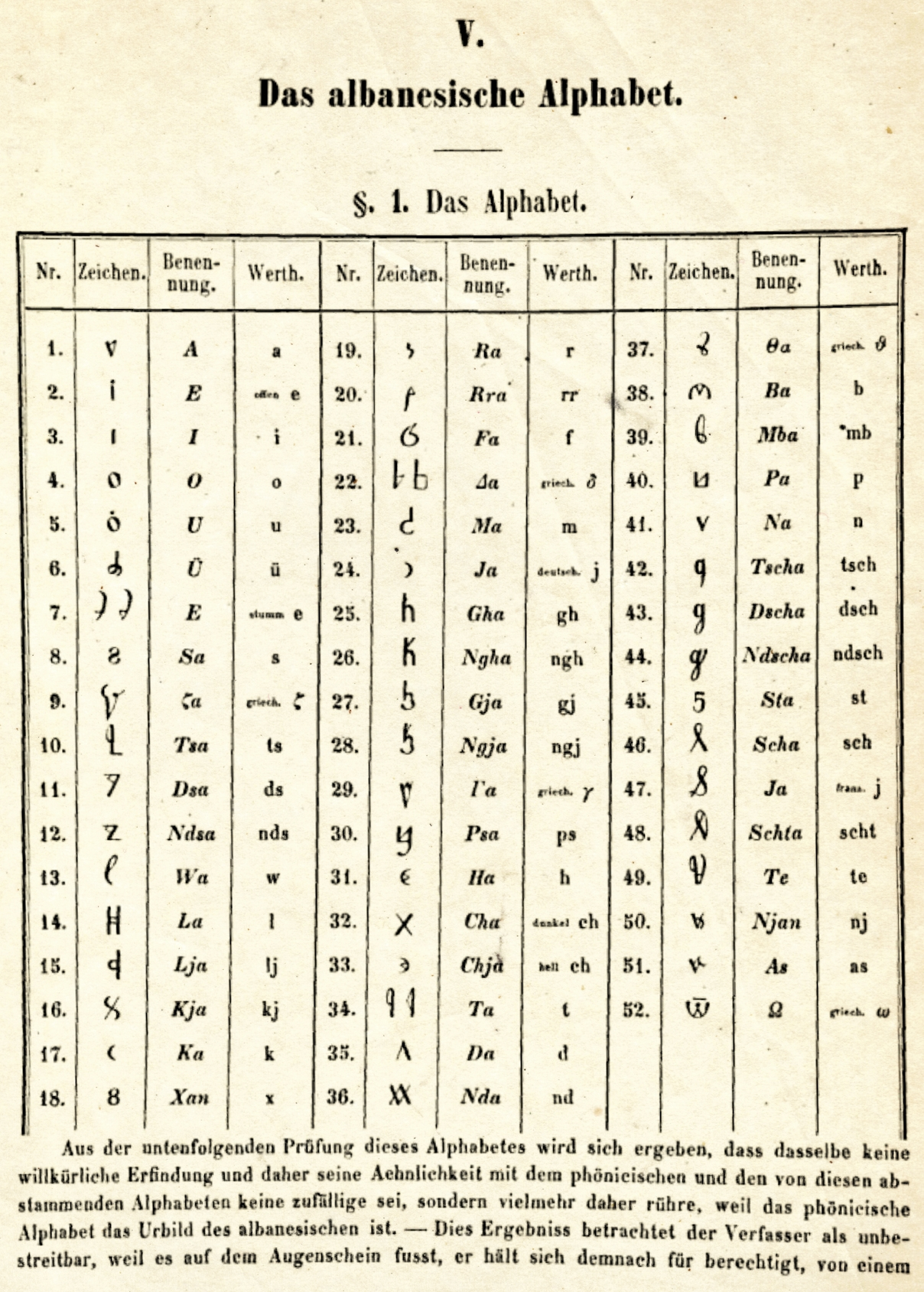
The alphabet of Theodhor Haxhifilipi as shown in Albanesische Studien by Johann Georg von Hahn in 1854. The alphabet was cut into type by the Austrian punchcutter Alois Auer as early as 1851.

The Todhri alphabet is an 18th-century Albanian alphabetical writing system invented for writing the Albanian language by Theodhor Haxhifilipi, also known as Dhaskal Todhri.

== History ==
It is a complex writing system of fifty-two characters which was used sporadically for written communication in and around Elbasan from the late eighteenth century on. The earliest dated text in Todhri's alphabet is Radhua Hesapesh (daybook) of a local merchant partnership known as Jakov Popa i Vogël dhe Shokët ("Jakov Popa Jr. & Friends"). The entries in Todhri's alphabet start on 10 August 1795 and continue until 1797. An even older text written in the Todhri alphabet was discovered recently in a family notebook in Elbasan, dated 1 January 1780. Other older texts possibly written by Todhri himself cannot be dated or confirmed.

The Todhri alphabet was rediscovered in Elbasan by Johann Georg von Hahn (1811–1869) who published it in 1854 his work Albanesische Studien in Jena. He thought it was 'the original' Albanian alphabet and a derivative of the ancient Phoenician alphabet. Leopold Geitler (1847–1885) and Slovenian scholar Rajko Nahtigal (1877–1958) subsequently studied the alphabet, concluding that it was derived primarily from the Roman cursive.

== Unicode ==
The Todhri alphabet was added to the Unicode Standard in September, 2024 with the release of version 16.0.

The Unicode block for Todhri is U+105C0–U+105FF:

Todhri^{[1]}^{[2]} Official Unicode Consortium code chart (PDF)
	0	1	2	3	4	5	6	7	8	9	A	B	C	D	E	F
U+105Cx	𐗀	𐗁	𐗂	𐗃	𐗄	𐗅	𐗆	𐗇	𐗈	𐗉	𐗊	𐗋	𐗌	𐗍	𐗎	𐗏
U+105Dx	𐗐	𐗑	𐗒	𐗓	𐗔	𐗕	𐗖	𐗗	𐗘	𐗙	𐗚	𐗛	𐗜	𐗝	𐗞	𐗟
U+105Ex	𐗠	𐗡	𐗢	𐗣	𐗤	𐗥	𐗦	𐗧	𐗨	𐗩	𐗪	𐗫	𐗬	𐗭	𐗮	𐗯
U+105Fx	𐗰	𐗱	𐗲	𐗳												
Notes 1.As of Unicode version 18.0 2.Grey areas indicate non-assigned code points

== See also ==
- Elbasan alphabet
- Vellara alphabet
- Vithkuqi alphabet
