= Theodhor Haxhifilipi =

Creator of the Todhri alphabet

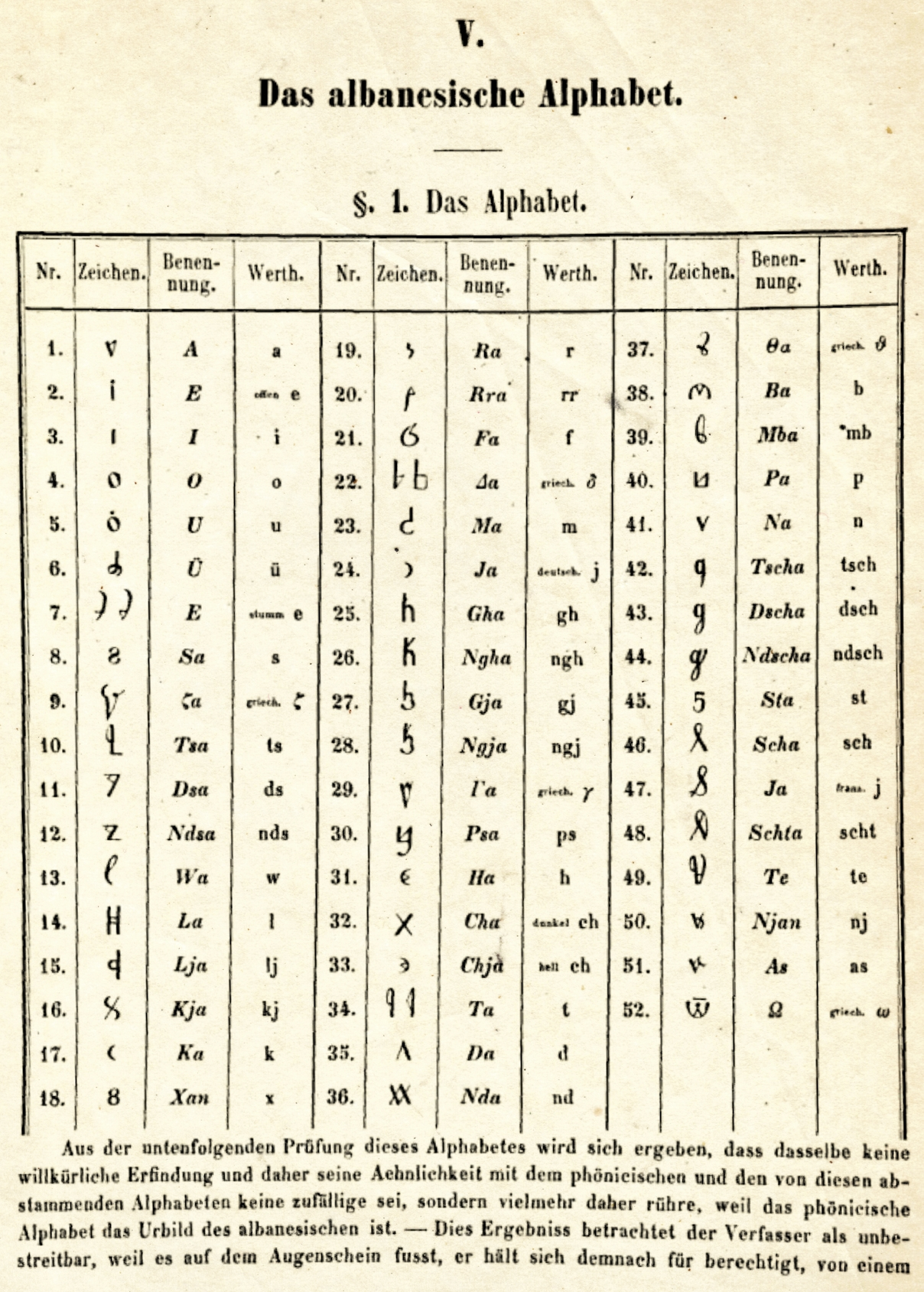
The alphabet of Theodhor Haxhifilipi as shown in Albanesische Studien by Johann Georg von Hahn in 1854. The alphabet was cut into type by the Austrian punchcutter Alois Auer as early as 1851.

Theodhor Haxhifilipi, also known as Dhaskal Todhri (Elbasan, c. 1730–1805), was a teacher from Elbasan who is credited as the inventor of an original Albanian alphabet. According to Kostandin Kristoforidhi, the Todhri script, as is called because of him, was either invented by Haxhifilipi or brought by him from Voskopojë. Haxhifilipi translated numerous liturgical works into Albanian, only a few of which have survived. A mass of John Chrysostom, preserved in a later manuscript of 32 pages, is amongst the rare ones kept at the National Library of Albania.

== Life ==
Not much is known about Haxhifilipi's life. There are only a few documentary sources. He was probably born into a family of silversmiths in the Kala neighbourhood of Elbasan. According to George Von Hahn, he finished his studies at the New Academy of Voskopojë. This is how Albanologist Robert Elsie describes his life:

One noted student of the New Academy in Voskopoja was Todhri (Theodor) Haxhifilipi (ca. 1730-1805), also known as Dhaskal Todhri from Elbasan, who, after training in Voskopoja, taught at the Greek school in his native Elbasan, hence the name Dhaskal (teacher). The German language scholar Johann Georg von Hahn (1811-1869), who visited Albania in the first half of the nineteenth century, refers to him as having translated not only the Old Testament but also the New Testament and other religious works. Most of his writings were unfortunately destroyed by fire during an epidemic in 1827 such that we can neither confirm nor disprove Hahn’s assertion about the Bible translations. Among the surviving fragments ascribed to Haxhifilipi, preserved both in the Central State Archives in Tirana and in the Austrian National Library in Vienna (Ser. Nova 3351), are Albanian translations of an Orthodox Book of Hours and of Mesha e Shën Jon Gojarit (The liturgy of St John Chrysostom).

Haxhifilipi is the author of a poem written in 1774 in Voskopojë, and published in a prayer book dedicated to Saint John Vladimir. Haxhifilipi was a teacher at the local Greek school in Elbasan. According to Robert Elsie, the Alphabet was used until 1930 in Elbasan.

== The alphabet and other works ==
It is not sure if Haxhifilipi invented the script, or was he the first one to bring it to Elbasan. According to Dhimitër Shuteriqi, the Todhri script could have been invented by Gregory of Durrës, who was also a teacher at the New Academy of Voskopojë, where Haxhifilipi was a student. The earliest dated text in Todhri's script is Radhua Hesapesh (daybook) of a local merchant partnership known as Jakov Popa i Vogël dhe Shokët (English: Jakov Popa Junior and Friends). The entries in Todhri's script start on 10 August 1795 and continue until 1797. An even older text written in Todhri script is discovered recently in family notebook in Elbasan, dated 1st of January 1780. Leopold Geitler (1847–1885) and Slovenian scholar Rajko Nahtigal (1877–1958) subsequently studied the script, concluding that it was derived primarily from the Roman cursive and Greek cursive from the 18th century.

Other older texts, possibly written by Todhri himself, cannot be dated or confirmed. Most of his texts burned from fear of the plague. Some handwritten copied fragments of his work remain in Elbasan. Among them the most famous is the John Chrysostom mass, copied around 1800 by a local igumen called Josif Haxhi Anastasi. An incomplete translation of a catechism from Adamantios Korais also remains, copied in the second half of the 19th century. There we have a small explanation for his work, that might be from Haxhifilipi himself,

I added a few new words [invented] in this text, as our Albanian language needs them in order to cover all of them from the Greek language. I beg you christian Albanians to study and love this catechism as if it is the nourishment of your soul, to learn and read all the time if you want the blessing of God night and day, if you want to grant a gift to our Lord...

The original text is dated to be from between 1782 and 1801. More fragments from Haxhifilipi are kept at the General Directorate of Archives (Albania).

== See also ==
- Albanian alphabet
- Elbasan script
- Vithkuqi script
- Vellara script
