= Hafiz Ali Ulqinaku =

Albanian Hafiz and religious leader

Ali Ulqinaku
- Title: Hafiz; Mufti

Personal life
- Born: 1855 Ulcinj, Ottoman Empire
- Died: April 23, 1913 (aged 59–60) Lezhë, Ottoman Empire
- Home town: Ulqin
- Main interest(s): Quranic Studies, Fiqh, Islamic literature, Islamic poetry

Religious life
- Religion: Islam
- Denomination: Sunni
- Jurisprudence: Hanafi
- Creed: Maturidi

Muslim leader
- Post: Mufti of Lezha
- Period in office: 1879-1913
- Influenced by: Sali ef. Hylen Daut Boriçi Isuf Tabaku Sheh Shamia

Hafiz Ali Ulqinaku (Ulcinj, 1855 – Lezhë, 23 April 1913) was an Albanian imam, alim, and patriot from Ulqin. He was known for his religious contributions, his role in the national spehere, and his literary works, particularly his translation of the Mawlid into Albanian.

== Early life ==
Hafiz Ali was born in 1853 in Ulqin, into the Behluli family of the Usta Ali clan. His father, Jakup Behluli, was a boatman who lived near the small beach of Ulqin. Hafiz Ali’s early education began in Ulqin, where he attended primary school and a part of the madrasa. He later continued his studies in Shkodër, at the madrasa of the Bushatlli family, where he received his ixhazet (diploma) in religious education. He studied and was influenced under notable teachers, including Sali ef. Hyla, Sheh Shamia, Daut Boriçi and Isuf Tabaku.

== Career ==
In 1882, Hafiz Ali Ulqinaku was appointed as a teacher at the elementary school in the Duda neighborhood of Shkodra. Two years later, in 1884, he took on the roles of teacher and imam in Lezha. His knowledge and character led the local community to nominate him as their mufti, a position he assumed in 1889 after approval from the authorities in Istanbul. As mufti, he was responsible for religious teaching, and overseeing Islamic practices in the region. He continued his duties as both religious leader and educator in Lezha until his death. Throughout his career, he concentrated on Islamic literature. He contributed to translating Islamic literary works into Albanian.

== Later life and death ==
After settling in Lezha with his family, where he lived for 24 years, making it his second home, during this time, he reached the peak of his career. He continued his religious duties until his death on April 23, 1913. Ulqinaku was buried in Shkodra, at the Shaban-efendi mosque in Mahalla e Re, though his grave is no longer found today.

== Works ==
He is particularly known for his translation of the famous Mawlid by Suleiman Çelebi into Albanian. In addition to his translation, he worked on several other linguistic and educational projects, including a Turkish-Albanian dictionary and various religious texts. His literary contributions were important for both religious and cultural education in the region.

- "Huda Rabim," a translation of Haki Erzurum's work into Albanian.
- "Mevludi," a translation of Suleiman Çelebi's work into Albanian.
- "Fjalori turqisht–shqip" (Turkish-Albanian Dictionary), published in 1897.
- "Fjalori shqip–turqisht" (Albanian-Turkish Dictionary), also published in 1897.
- "Ferrëfenjësi" (Mexhmuat-ul aval), a collection of religious texts.

== See also ==
- Islam in Albania
- Muslim Community of Albania
- Albanian Sunni Muslims
