= Todhri (Unicode block) =

- Range: U+105C0..U+105FF (64 code points)
- Plane: SMP
- Scripts: Todhri
- Assigned: 52 code points
- Unused: 12 reserved code points

Unicode version history
- 16.0 (2024): 52 (+52)

Unicode documentation
- Code chart ∣ Web page

Todhri is a Unicode block containing letters for the Todhri alphabet, an 18th-century invention for writing the Albanian language by Theodhor Haxhifilipi.

Todhri^{[1]}^{[2]} Official Unicode Consortium code chart (PDF)
	0	1	2	3	4	5	6	7	8	9	A	B	C	D	E	F
U+105Cx	𐗀	𐗁	𐗂	𐗃	𐗄	𐗅	𐗆	𐗇	𐗈	𐗉	𐗊	𐗋	𐗌	𐗍	𐗎	𐗏
U+105Dx	𐗐	𐗑	𐗒	𐗓	𐗔	𐗕	𐗖	𐗗	𐗘	𐗙	𐗚	𐗛	𐗜	𐗝	𐗞	𐗟
U+105Ex	𐗠	𐗡	𐗢	𐗣	𐗤	𐗥	𐗦	𐗧	𐗨	𐗩	𐗪	𐗫	𐗬	𐗭	𐗮	𐗯
U+105Fx	𐗰	𐗱	𐗲	𐗳												
Notes: 1. As of Unicode version 16.0; 2. Grey areas indicate non-assigned code points

== History ==
The following Unicode-related documents record the purpose and process of defining specific characters in the Todhri block:

Version	Final code points (Note: Proposed code points and characters names may differ from final code points and names)	Count	L2 ID	WG2 ID	Document
16.0	U+105C0..105F3	52	L2/20-188	N5139	Proposal for encoding the Todhri script in the SMP of the UCS, 2020-07-10
16.0	U+105C0..105F3	52	L2/20-169		Anderson, Deborah; Whistler, Ken; Pournader, Roozbeh; Moore, Lisa; Constable, Peter; Liang, Hai (2020-07-21), "4. Todhri", Recommendations to UTC #164 July 2020 on Script Proposals
16.0	U+105C0..105F3	52	L2/20-250		Anderson, Deborah; Whistler, Ken; Pournader, Roozbeh; Moore, Lisa; Constable, Peter; Liang, Hai (2020-10-01), "2. Todhr", Recommendations to UTC #165 October 2020 on Script Proposals
16.0	U+105C0..105F3	52	L2/20-237		Moore, Lisa (2020-10-27), "Section 2, Todhri", UTC #165 Minutes
16.0	U+105C0..105F3	52	L2/20-188R2	N5139R2	Everson, Michael (2020-12-31), Proposal for encoding the Todhri script in the SMP of the UCS
16.0	U+105C0..105F3	52	L2/21-016R		Anderson, Deborah; Whistler, Ken; Pournader, Roozbeh; Moore, Lisa; Liang, Hai (2021-01-14), "4 Todhri", Recommendations to UTC #166 January 2021 on Script Proposals
16.0	U+105C0..105F3	52	L2/22-074		Pournader, Roozbeh (2022-02-12), Todhri encoding options
16.0	U+105C0..105F3	52	L2/22-068		Anderson, Deborah; Whistler, Ken; Pournader, Roozbeh; Constable, Peter (2022-04-15), "2 Todhri", Recommendations to UTC #171 April 2022 on Script Proposals
16.0	U+105C0..105F3	52	L2/22-061		Constable, Peter (2022-07-27), "D.1 Section 2 Todhri", Approved Minutes of UTC Meeting 171
