= Ioannis Vilaras =

Greek doctor and lyricist

Yianis Vilaras
- Born: 1771; Kythira, Ionian Islands under Venetian rule (now in Greece)
- Died: 1823 (aged 51–52); Zagori, Ottoman Empire (now in Greece)
- Occupations: poet, prose writer

Ioannis "Yianis" Vilaras (Greek: Ἰωάννης (Γιάνης) Βηλαράς; 1771–1823) was a Greek medical doctor, lyricist and writer who often discussed linguistic matters (see Greek language question) and maintained ties with many figures of the Modern Greek Enlightenment movement.

His name is also related to an original Albanian Vellara alphabet, until now only discovered in a few pages that Vilaras wrote in the Albanian language. Vilaras is remembered primarily as a modern Greek poet, non-native Albanian speaker but fluent, according to François Pouqueville, who also describes him as bright.

== Biography ==
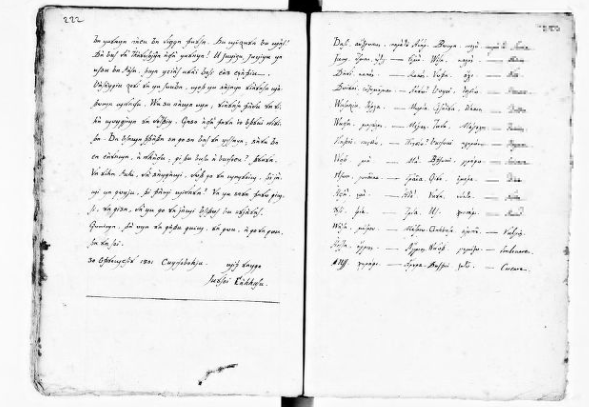
Correspondence of Ioannis Vilaras, in Albanian, with original alphabet. Signed by Vilaras, Vokopolje, 1801 Source: Bibliothèque nationale de France. Département des manuscrits. Under the name: Supplément grec 251 (p. 222-223)

Vilaras was born on the island of Kythira, then part of the Venetian Republic, and studied medicine in Padua, Italy. He later moved to Ioannina, his father's home city, where he was connected with Ali Pasha and became friends with Athanasios Psalidas. Vilaras's father was also a doctor in the area.

After the fall of Ioannina to the Turks, he fled to Tsepelovo in Zagori, where he died three years later, in 1823.

== Work ==
Vilaras was one of the first modern Greek poets and important figures of modern Greek literature. He favoured an extreme/radical version of Demotic Greek (people's language), based mainly on the phonetic orthography, without using historical orthography or tones.

His most famous work is the Romeiki glosa (Ρομεηκη γλοσα [sic]), written in Corfu in 1814, which was different from the mainstream ways of Greek writing.

His other works include Amartia and Gnothi Safton. In 1953, "Apanta of Vilaras" ("Complete Works of Vilaras") was published, including erotic and lyric poems, myths, and enigmas.

== Works ==
=== Poetry ===
Year	Title	Greek transliteration and English name
1827	Piimata ke peza tina	Ποιήματα και πεζά τινά
1916	Ta piimata	Τα ποιήματα Poems
-	To filopono melissi	Το φιλόπονο μελίσσι

=== Prose ===
Title	Greek transliteration and English name
I romeiki glosa stin tipografia ton Korfon 1813), i Mikri orminia gia ta gramata ke tin orthografia tia romeikis glosas	Η ρομεηκη γλοσα στην τηπογραφηα τον Κορφον 1814 (modern. τυπώθηκε στην Κέρκυρα το 1814), ή Μηκρη ορμηνια για τα γραματα κε την ορθογραφηα της ρομεηκης γλοσας The modern Greek in Romanized transliteration is: I Romaiiki glossa typothike stin Kerkyra to 1814 (τυπώθηκε στην Κέρκυρα το 1814), gramata is now grammata ke is now kai and orthografia with an eta now with an iota, the sentence in today's Greek is slightly different from at that time. The Romaiki (now Greek) Language Written In Corfu In 1814
O Ligiotatos taxiodiotis	Ο Λογιώτατος ταξιδιώτης
O Logiotatos i o Kolokythoulis	Ο Λογιώτατος ή ο Κολοκυθούλης

== See also ==
- Vellara alphabet
