= Elifba alphabet =

Writing system for the Albanian language during the Ottoman Empire

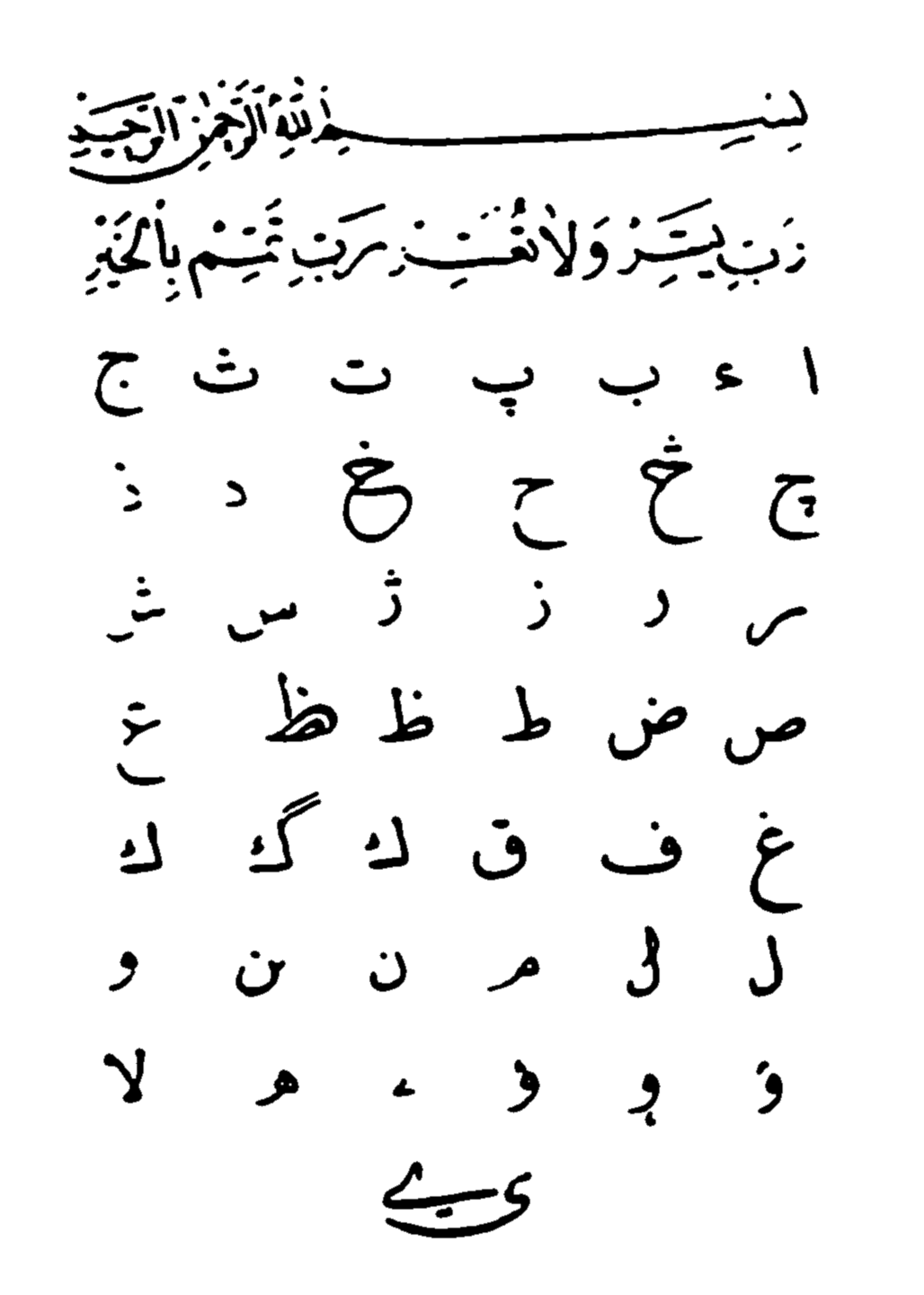
The new Elifbaja shqip by Rexhep Voka in 1911

The Elifba alphabet (Elifba Albanian: ئەلیفبایا ئارابۋ-شكېپ, Albanian: Elifbaja, from Ottoman Turkish: الفبا, romanized: Elifbâ) was one of the main writing systems for the Albanian language during the time of the Ottoman Empire from the 19th century to 1911. This Albanian variant of the Ottoman Turkish alphabet was used to write the Albanian language. The last version of the Elifbaja shqip was invented by the rilindas, Rexhep Voka (1847-1917). Although the first standardized Albanian script based on the Arabic alphabet was published in the 1800s, Sufi Albanian poets began composing poetry in Albanian using the Arabic script as early as the late 17th century.

== History ==
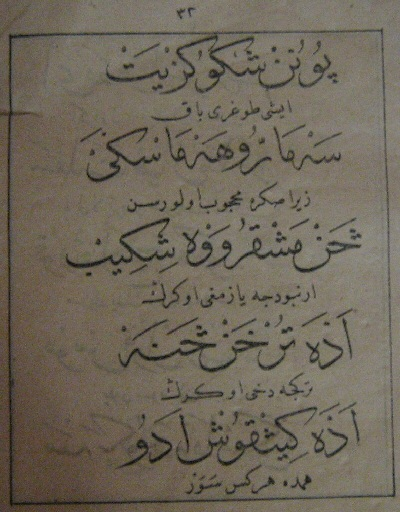
Page from the 1861 Daut Boriçi primer.

The Ottoman Turkish alphabet was mainly favored by Albanian Muslims, but also used by some Christians. After being especially used during the Bejte poetry, a primer for the Albanian language in Arabic script was published in 1861 in Constantinople by Mullah Daut Boriçi, a prominent member of the League of Prizren.

During 1909 and 1910 there were movements by Albanian Young Turks supporters to adopt the Arabic alphabet, as they considered the Latin script to be un-Islamic. In Elbasan, Muslim clerics led a demonstration for the Arabic script, telling their congregations that using the Latin script would make them infidels. In 1911, the Young Turks dropped their opposition to the Latin alphabet, and the current Latin alphabet for Albanian was adopted. In order to eliminate ambiguity in the pronunciation of the Arabic script, Rexhep Voka developed a customized Arabic alphabet consisting of 44 consonants and vowels, which he published in 1911. However, it was hardly used anymore due to the Congress of Manastir. Tiranli Fazli then used this script to publish a thirty-two page grammar. Only one Albanian newspaper at the time ever appeared in Arabic script, and it lasted a brief period. Regardless of what script appeared, such material raised Albanian national consciousness: There were Albanian Arabic alphabet and reading books published in Constantinople in 1912, and also the Albanian Zemér newspaper published in Constantinople in 1911-12.

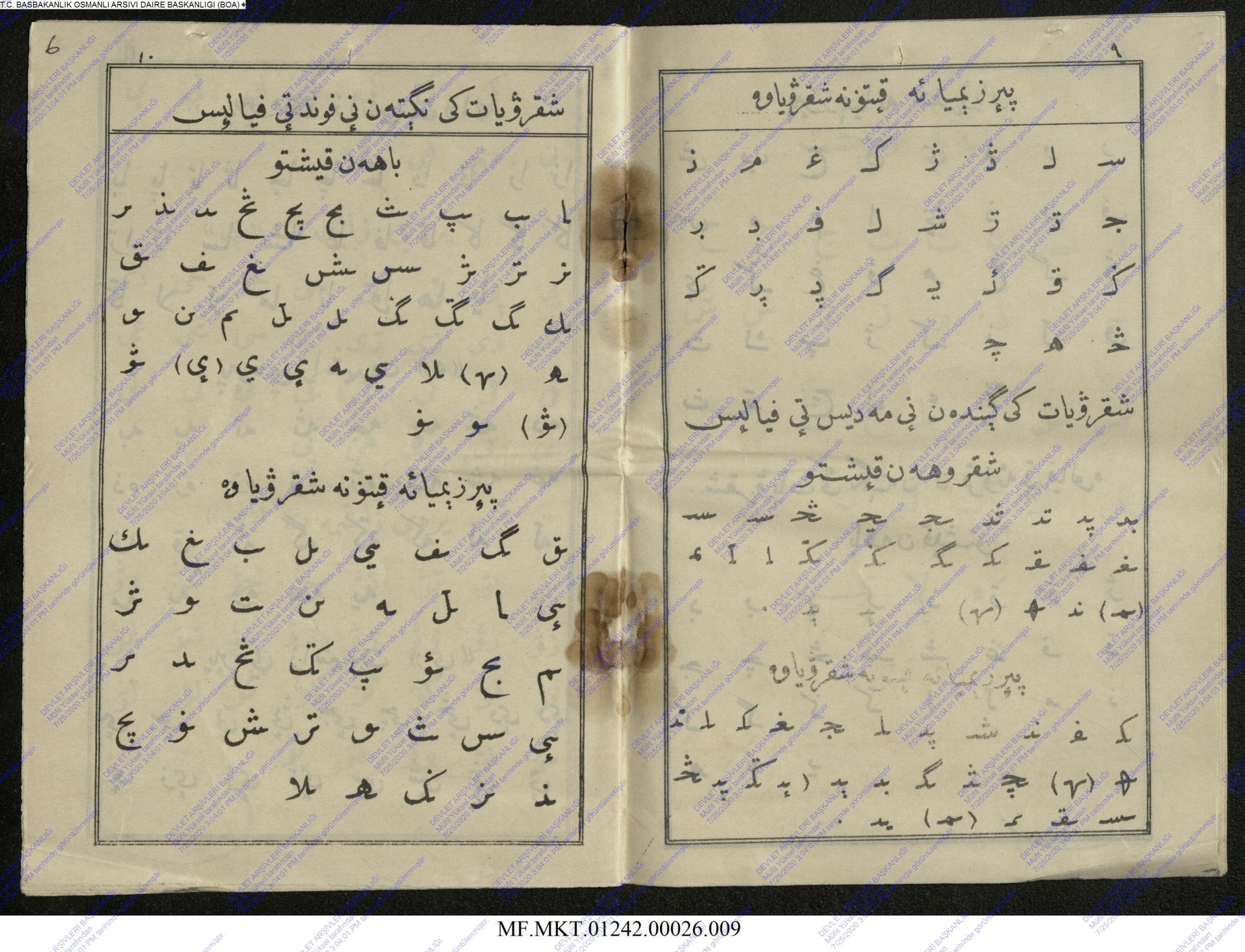
Page from 1911 Albainian Alphabet Primer - Istanbul

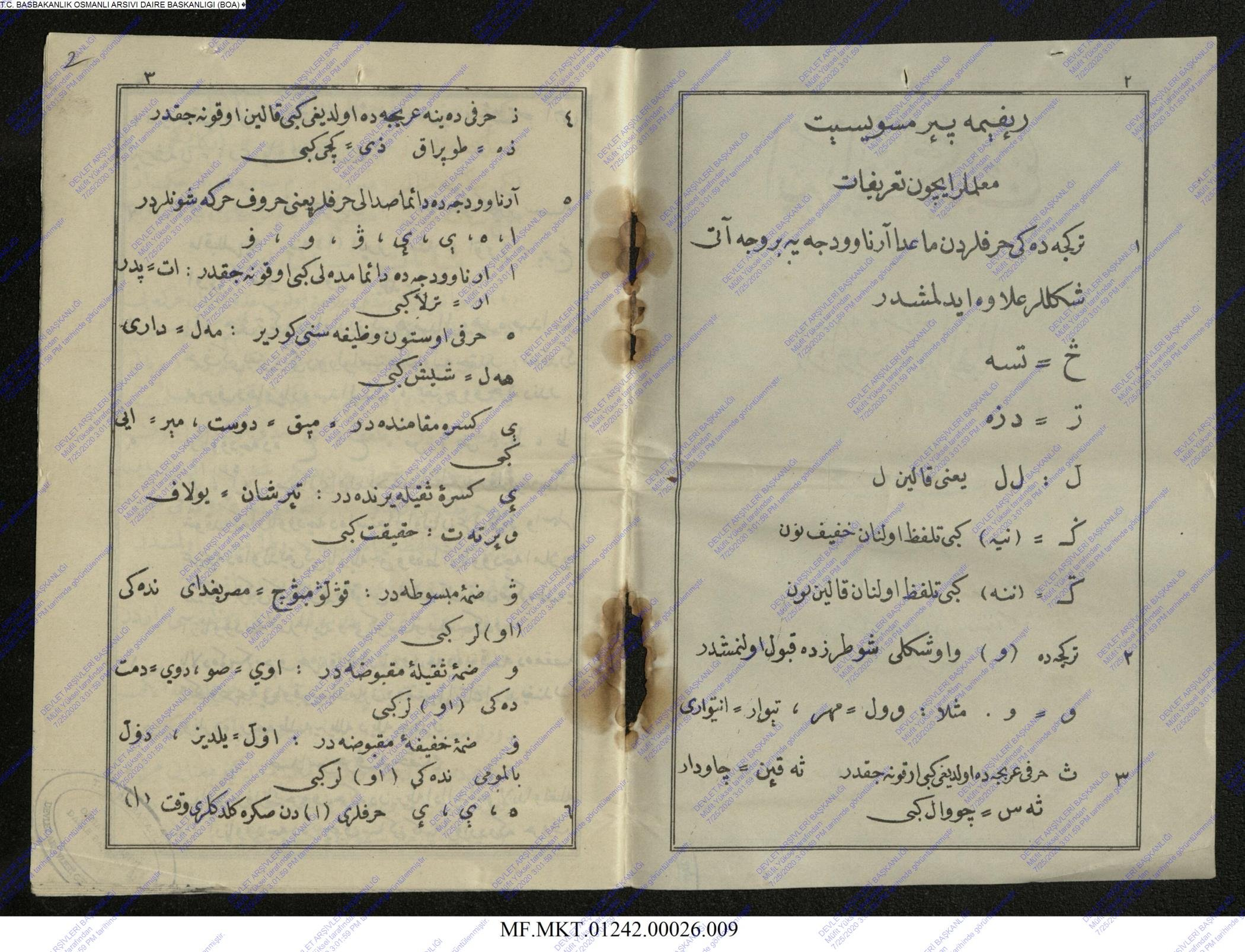
Page from 1911 Albainian Alphabet Primer - Istanbul

== Alphabet ==
Here ىٕ is an approximation of the glyph used to represent ë.

Latin	Arabic				IPA
Latin	Final	Medial	Initial	Isolated	IPA
A	ـا		ا		[a]
B	ـب	ـبـ	بـ	ب	[b]
C	ـڅ	ـڅـ	څـ	څ	[ts]
Ç	ـچ	ـچـ	چـ	چ	[tʃ]
D	ـد		د		[d]
Dh	ـذ		ذ		[ð]
E	ـە		ئە	ە	[ɛ]
Ë	ـىٕ	ـىٕـ	ىٕـ	ىٕ	[ə]
F	ـف	ـفـ	فـ	ف	[f]
G	ـغ	ـغـ	غـ	غ	[g]
Gj	ـگ	ـگـ	گـ	گ	[ɟ]
H	ـھ	ـھـ	ھـ	ھ	[h]
I	ـې	ـېـ	اېـ	ې	[i]
J	ـی	ـیـ	یـ	ی	[j]
K	ـق	ـقـ	قـ	ق	[k]
L	ـل	ـلـ	لـ	ل	[l]
Ll	ـݪ	ـݪـ	ݪـ	ݪ	[ɫ]
M	ـم	ـمـ	مـ	م	[m]
N	ـن	ـنـ	نـ	ن	[n]
Ng	ـݿ	ـݿـ	ݿـ	ݿ	[ŋ]
Nj	‍ـڬ	‍ـڬـ	ڬـ	ڬ	[ɲ]
O	ـۋ		اۋ	ۋ	[o]
P	ـپ	ـپـ	پـ	پ	[p]
Q	ـك	ـكـ	كـ	ك	[c]
R	ـر		ر		[ɾ]
Rr	ـݛ		ݛ		[ɾ]
S	ـس	ـسـ	سـ	س	[s]
Sh	ـش	ـشـ	شـ	ش	[ʃ]
T	ـت	ـتـ	تـ	ت	[t]
Th	ـث	ـثـ	ثـ	ث	[θ]
U	ـو		او	و	[u]
V	ـڤ	ـڤـ	ڤـ	ڤ	[v]
X	ـڗ		ڗ		[dz]
Xh	ـج	ـجـ	جـ	ج	[dʒ]
Y	ـۏ		اۏ	ۏ	[y]
Z	ـز		ز		[z]
Zh	ـژ		ژ		[ʒ]

== Sample text ==
Article 1 of the Universal Declaration of Human Rights in Albanian:

In Latin	In Arabic	Translation
Të gjithë njerëzit lindin të lirë dhe të barabartë në dinjitet dhe në të drejta. Ata kanë arsye dhe ndërgjegje dhe duhet të sillen ndaj njëri tjetrit me frymë vëllazërimi.	تىٕ گېثىٕ ݢەرىٕزېت لېندېن تىٕ لېرىٕ ذە تىٕ بارابارتىٕ نىٕ دېڬېتەت ذە نىٕ تىٕ درەیتا. اتا قانىٕ ارسۏئە ذە ندىٕرگەگە ذە دوھەت تىٕ سېللەن ندای ڬىٕرې تیەترېت مە فرۏمىٕ ڤىٕللازىٕرېمې.	All human beings are born free and equal in dignity and rights. They are endowed with reason and conscience and should act towards one another in a spirit of brotherhood.
