= Shkodra revolt of 1854 =

Uprising in Albania

Shkodër revolt of Osman Alia
Date	1854
Location	Shkodër, Sanjak of Scutari, Ottoman Empire
Result	Inconclusive

Belligerents
Albanian Rebels	Ottoman Empire

Commanders and leaders
Hasan Alia	Masar Pasha; Mustafa Pasha

Strength
Unknown	Unknown

The Shkodra revolt of 1854 was one of the 19th-century uprisings in Ottoman Albania directed against the Ottoman authorities.

== Background ==
During the 1851-1852 period, the new governor of Shkodra, Masar Pasha, doubled the taxes on the city's Christians. The Catholic Christians were one of the two big communities of the city, the others being the Muslims. Representatives of the Christian community protested before the Sublime Port, but to no avail. To calm down the tense situation, the authorities in the spring of 1854 proclaimed a decree of the Sultan, which described the Christian as equal citizens with the Muslims. However, the effort failed because the population was disturbed by Masar Pasha's taxes and speculation with the grain trade done by politically-connected merchants. In 1854, when the Crimean War and conflicts with Montenegro were ongoing, they collected the grain and sold it abroad at a higher profit. As a result, food prices rose sharply, which together with the city's population's obligation to feed 20,000 Ottoman soldiers stationed on the border with Montenegro, brought famine and the first related deaths.

== Events ==
On August 7 the citizenry led by Hasan Alia, a Muslim cleric who would later be known as Sheh Shamia, organized a large meeting. There the city's population asked for a ban on the export of grain, the reduction of prices and the punishment of speculators. Given the unresponsiveness of the authorities, the next day a large crowd of several thousand artisans and poor workers attacked the market, which was closed, while the governors were forced to retreat to the fortress. The former opened the barns and distributed grain to poor residents. Sheh Shamia set an example by opening his father's barns first. On August 9 a group of youngsters asked for the removal of Masar Pasha from his position. The French consul in the city tried to calm them down, stating that unrest could pose risks to the city due to the ongoing conflict with neighboring Montenegro.

== Aftermath ==
After the end of the military operations on the border with Montenegro, Masar Pasha was replaced with Mustafa Pasha to Shkodër. He immediately undertook a large number of arrests. Sheh Shamia and managed to flee Albania, while the other leaders of the revolt were exiled. The city authorities stopped the grain exports, and refrained from implementing the Tanzimat reforms, which had been planned by the Sublime Port and were seen as controversial around the empire.

== See also ==
- Ottoman Albania
