= Albanian Braille =

Braille alphabet for the Albanian language

- Script type: alphabet
- Print basis: Albanian alphabet
- Languages: Albanian

Related scripts
- Parent systems: Braille: Albanian Braille

Albanian Braille is the braille alphabet for writing the Albanian language. Like other braille alphabets for languages written in the Latin script, the simple Latin letters are all assigned values based on international braille.

== Alphabet ==
| Letter | a | b | c | ç | d | dh | e | ë | f | g | gj | h |
|---|---|---|---|---|---|---|---|---|---|---|---|---|
| Braille | ⠁ (braille pattern dots-1) | ⠃ (braille pattern dots-12) | ⠉ (braille pattern dots-14) | ⠩ (braille pattern dots-146) | ⠙ (braille pattern dots-145) | ⠹ (braille pattern dots-1456) | ⠑ (braille pattern dots-15) | ⠡ (braille pattern dots-16) | ⠋ (braille pattern dots-124) | ⠛ (braille pattern dots-1245) | ⠻ (braille pattern dots-12456) | ⠓ (braille pattern dots-125) |
| Braille | ⠁ | ⠃ | ⠉ | ⠩ | ⠙ | ⠹ | ⠑ | ⠡ | ⠋ | ⠛ | ⠻ | ⠓ |
| Letter | i | j | k | l | ll | m | n | nj | o | p | q | r |
| Braille | ⠊ (braille pattern dots-24) | ⠚ (braille pattern dots-245) | ⠅ (braille pattern dots-13) | ⠇ (braille pattern dots-123) | ⠷ (braille pattern dots-12356) | ⠍ (braille pattern dots-134) | ⠝ (braille pattern dots-1345) | ⠫ (braille pattern dots-1246) | ⠕ (braille pattern dots-135) | ⠏ (braille pattern dots-1234) | ⠯ (braille pattern dots-12346) | ⠗ (braille pattern dots-1235) |
| Braille | ⠊ | ⠚ | ⠅ | ⠇ | ⠷ | ⠍ | ⠝ | ⠫ | ⠕ | ⠏ | ⠯ | ⠗ |
| Letter | rr | s | sh | t | th | u | v | x | xh | y | z | zh |
| Braille | ⠟ (braille pattern dots-12345) | ⠎ (braille pattern dots-234) | ⠱ (braille pattern dots-156) | ⠞ (braille pattern dots-2345) | ⠾ (braille pattern dots-23456) | ⠥ (braille pattern dots-136) | ⠧ (braille pattern dots-1236) | ⠭ (braille pattern dots-1346) | ⠮ (braille pattern dots-2346) | ⠽ (braille pattern dots-13456) | ⠵ (braille pattern dots-1356) | ⠳ (braille pattern dots-1256) |
| Braille | ⠟ | ⠎ | ⠱ | ⠞ | ⠾ | ⠥ | ⠧ | ⠭ | ⠮ | ⠽ | ⠵ | ⠳ |

As in several other braille alphabets, letters and digraphs are frequently derived by adding a dot 6 or reversing the base letter.

== Punctuation ==
| Punctuation | | | | | | | | | Quote | | |
| Punctuation | , | . | ; | : | ? | ! | - | ' | open | close | () |
|---|---|---|---|---|---|---|---|---|---|---|---|
| Braille | ⠂ (braille pattern dots-2) | ⠲ (braille pattern dots-256) | ⠆ (braille pattern dots-23) | ⠒ (braille pattern dots-25) | ⠢ (braille pattern dots-26) | ⠖ (braille pattern dots-235) | ⠤ (braille pattern dots-36) | ⠄ (braille pattern dots-3) | ⠦ (braille pattern dots-236) | ⠴ (braille pattern dots-356) | ⠶ (braille pattern dots-2356) |
| Braille | ⠂ | ⠲ | ⠆ | ⠒ | ⠢ | ⠖ | ⠤ | ⠄ | ⠦ | ⠴ | ⠶ |

== Formatting ==
| ⠼ (braille pattern dots-3456) | ⠨ (braille pattern dots-46) |
| (digit) | (caps) |
