= Sheh Shamia =

Albanian Imam and Sufi sheikh

Hajji Hasan Aliu
- Title: Sheikh

Personal life
- Born: 1814 Shkodër, Ottoman Empire
- Died: 1891 (aged 76–77) Shkodër, Ottoman Empire
- Home town: Shkodër
- Main interest(s): Aqidah (Islamic theology), Fiqh, Tasawwuf (Sufism)

Religious life
- Religion: Islam
- Denomination: Sunni
- Jurisprudence: Hanafi
- Tariqa: Naqshbandi
- Creed: Maturidi

Muslim leader
- Influenced by: Daut Boriçi
- Influenced: Hafiz Ali Ulqinaku

Hajji Hasan Sheikh Shamia or Sheh Shamia (Shkodër, 1814 – 25 March 1891) was a leading reform imam of the 19th century. It is thought that his name comes from his wearing a white turban around his red taqiyah, unusual at a time when most imams wore red.

Consul Louis Hyacinthe Hecquard also referred to him as Shamil, an honorific used by the Ottoman authorities based on Shamil, a prominent leader in the struggles of Dagestan against Russian rule of the Caucasus.

== Biography ==
He was born in the Zdrale neighbourhood of Shkodër, the son of Oso Alia, whose family came from the village of Dragon in Skadarska Krajina, in what is now Montenegro. Shamia began his religious education at the age of fourteen in private study with Daut Boriçi. Shamia taught theology himself around 1837 at Muhammad Ali Pasha of Egypt Madrasah in Kavala, and participated with distinction in the Istanbul Congresses of Ulema in 1842–44. Going on Hajj to Mecca gave him the distinction of Hajji (Albanian: Haxhi) and staying there for a year as a muhajir (Albanian: muxhavir) gave him the title Sheikh (Albanian: Sheh). He is thought to have belonged to the Naqshbandi tariqa (school) of Sufism, or perhaps less likely to the Bektashi Order.

In 1854, during a period of great privation in Shkodër, he opened the granaries of his grain speculator father, urging speculators and swindlers throughout the community to do the same. By ending the famine, he earned a song of praise: "Rroftë e qoftë Hasan Alia / sekretar Filip Çurçia" (“Long live Hasan Alia / secretary Filip Çurçia," the latter his Catholic clerk). Afterwards, he went into exile around the Mediterranean, including Venice, France, Spain, and Egypt. Muhammad Ali's family is said to have urged Shamia's pardon for the thefts and vandalism in 1864. On his return to Shkodër, he married a woman from the family of Oso Kuka and had a son and a daughter with her, settling down in the Karahase neighborhood where he preached at the local mosque. At his office at the Shkodër Bazaar, he provided expertise on theology and fiqh (Islamic jurisprudence) while selling traditional herbal medicine.

He reformed some customs of local Muslims as the first imam to preach in the Albanian language, despite the opposition of the authorities. On his death in 1891, he was buried in the grounds of the mosque he served.
