= Süleyman Çelebi (poet) =

Ottoman poet, mystic, and author of the most popular Turkish written Mawlid

Süleyman Çelebi (c. 1351 – 1422 CE) (pronounced Sulaiman Chalabi), imam of the Grand Mosque of Bursa during the Ottoman Empire, was an Islamic mystic and author whose only known work is Wasilat al-Najat. Commonly known as the Mevlidi Sherif - Süleyman Çelebi, it is the first and most famous of the Turkish-written mawlids on the birth of the Islamic prophet Muhammad. Chalabi was born sometime between 1346–1351 and died in 1422 CE.

== Biography ==
He was born in the period of Orhan Gazi. According to some sources, he is the son of Ahmed Pasha, one of the viziers of the Ottoman Sultan Murad I, and the grandson of Sheikh Mahmud Efendi. His grandfather, aka Mahmud Bey, is the grandson of Sheikh Edebali and was one of those who sailed to Rumelia in 1338 under the leadership of Süleyman Pasha, son of Orhan.

He received a good education in Bursa in his youth. At that time, the title of "Çelebi" was given to scholars and the elders of the Mevlevi Order. However, there is no evidence that he was a Mevlevi. He attracted the attention of Sultan Bayezid I with his knowledgeable attitude and was appointed as the imam of the Grand Mosque, whose construction was completed in 1399. He wrote his famous work Vesiletü'n Necat having been influenced by a mystical experience he had during this mission.

According to legend, Süleyman Çelebi resented an Iranian preacher who said that Muhammad was not much different from other prophets and wrote his mawlid to express that he was superior to other prophets. During the Ottoman Interregnum, which was a weak phase of the Ottoman Empire and all kinds of turmoil prevailed in the Anatolian lands, Süleyman Çelebi was on the side of the Ahl as-Sunnah in the conflict between Batiniyya esoteric views and Sunnis. For this reason, it is stated that one of the reasons for writing the mawlid was to support the followers of the Ahl as-Sunnah. He completed his work in 1409 (approximately at the age of 60). While writing his work, the works he referenced were determined to be Âşık Paşa's Garibname, Erzurumlu Darir's Siyerü'n Nebi, Eb'ul Hasan Bekri's Siyer and Muhyiddin Ibn al-Arabi's Fusus.

The tomb of Süleyman Çelebi is on Çekirge Road in Bursa.

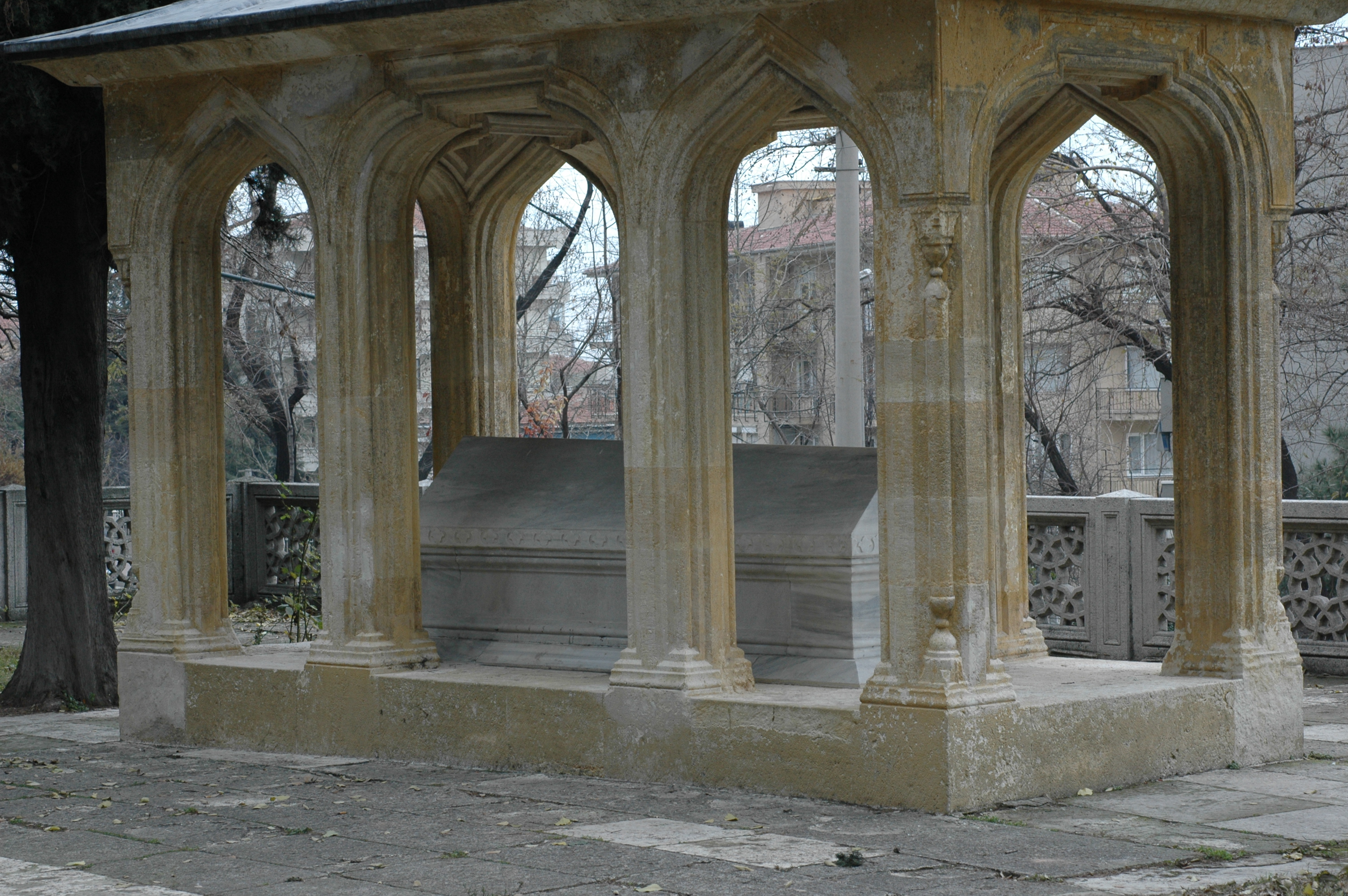
Süleyman Çelebi's tomb

== See also ==
- List of Turkish Mawlid texts

== Notes ==
- "Süleyman Çelebi Hayatı, Eserleri, Edebi Kişiliği" (in Turkish).
- "Süleyman Çelebi Kimdir Hayatı Eserleri Özellikleri". www.turkedebiyati.org.
- "Süleyman Çelebi kimdir?". www.biyografi.info (in Turkish).
- "Süleyman Çelebi Hazretleri Hayatı Kimdir". www.evliyalarimiz.com.
