= Vellara script =

Alphabet used in early 19th-century Albania

Correspondence of Ioannis Vilaras, in Albanian, with original alphabet. Signed by Vilaras, Vokopolje, Berat, 1801

Vellara script or Vellara alphabet is an Albanian alphabet encountered for the first time in the early 19th century. It is named after the Greek doctor, lyricist and writer Ioannis Vilaras (Jan Vellarai in Albanian), the author of a manuscript where this alphabet is documented for the first and so far the only time.

== Ioannis Vilaras ==
Vilaras studied medicine in Padua in 1789 and later lived in Venice. In 1801, he became a physician to Veli, son of Ali Pasha Tepelena (1741–1822). Vilaras is remembered today primarily as a modern Greek poet, non-native Albanian speaker but fluent, according to François Pouqueville, who also describes him as bright. Vilaras spent time in southern Albania.

== The manuscript ==
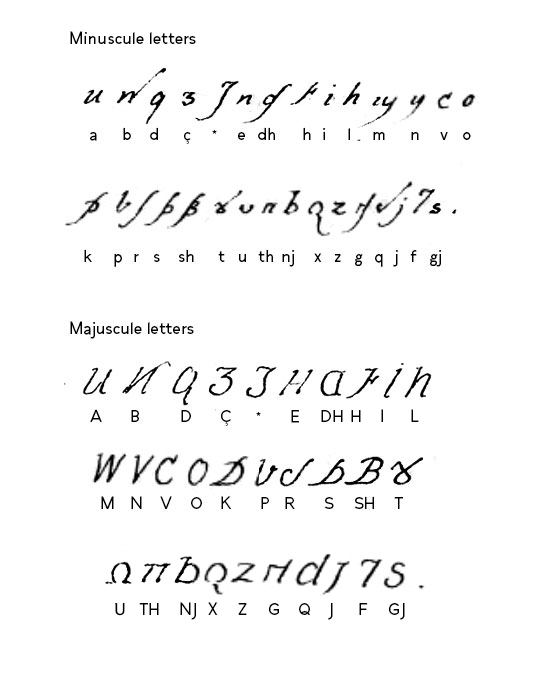
Vellara alphabet letters with corresponding values from Albanian Latin alphabet.

The manuscript of the work was donated to the Bibliothèque Nationale in Paris (supplément grec 251, f. 138–187) in 1819 by François Pouqueville (1770–1839), French consul in Janina during the reign of Ali Pasha. Pouqueville was aware of the value of the work, noting: "Je possède un manuscrit, une grammaire grecque vulgaire et schype qui pourrait être utile aux philologues" (I possess a manuscript, a vulgar Greek and Albanian grammar which could be of use to philologists), but chose not to publish it in his travel narratives. Pages 137–226 contain the material in Albanian.

Pages 137–138 contain a list of proverbs in modern Greek and Albanian. Pages 138–187, in two columns per page format, contain the collection of grammatical notes both in Greek and Albanian. These bilingual grammatical notes, dated 1801, were designed no doubt to teach other Greek-speakers Albanian. On page 187, there is a list of names of living things. Page 191 starts the Greek-Albanian phraseologies. On page 217, there is a mini-dictionary with trees names, human body parts, and vegetable names. The alphabet shows in page 219. Appendixed to the grammatical notes is also a letter dated 30 October 1801, written in Albanian in Vellara's handwriting from the village of Vokopolë, south of Berat, where the physician had been obliged to follow Veli during the latter's military campaign against Ibrahim of Berat.

== The alphabet ==
The alphabet comprises 30 letters. It leans towards the Latin script, and less the Greek one, with some special characters for Albanian's particular sounds. Albanian alphabet's "c" and "x" are covered by a single letter ("x" is never found in Vellara's writings). Today's "ë" is represented by "e", and "e" by "é". There are no letters for today's digraphs "ll", "rr", "zh", and "y". Instead, "y" is substituted with "u" or "i". Today's "nj" is represented by a Cyrillic letter.

== History ==
Vilara's letter signed by him as "30 Oktomvrit 1801 Vagopolja, mik tëndë Jatroi Vellara" (October 30, 1801, Vokopolja, your friend Doctor Vellara), shows that the alphabet was known and used by other people at that time.

During the Albanian National Renaissance, the script was made known to the Albanian circles, first published in 1898 by the Albania magazine in Brussels.

== See also ==
- Veso Bey alphabet
- Constantine of Berat
