= Johann Georg von Hahn =

Austrian diplomat and linguist (1811–1869)

Johann Georg von Hahn (11 July 1811 – 23 September 1869) was a German diplomat, philologist and specialist in Albanian history, language and culture, who spent the majority of his career working within the bounds of the Austrian Empire.

Hahn was born in Frankfurt am Main. In 1847, he was named Austrian consul in Ioannina, which was then part of the Ottoman Empire, today in Greece. He was transferred to the Hellenic Kingdom on the island of Syros in 1851, and until 1869 was the consul-general in Athens. He is considered the founder of Albanian studies. He assembled and published source materials on Albanian language and culture as descendants of ancient Illyrians.

== Works ==
- Albanesische Studien. 3 vols. Jena: F. Mauko, 1854; Vienna: Hof- und Staatsdruckerei, 1853 (reprint Dion.Karavias, Athen 1981)
- Reise von Belgrad nach Salonik. Vienna: K. K. Consul für östliche Griechenland, 1861.
- Griechische und albanesische Märchen. 2 vols. Leipzig: 1864; Munich/Berlin 1918 – as ebook and several Google Books scans at archive.org
- Reise durch die Gebiete von Drin und Wardar. Vienna: 1867.
- Contes populaires grecs Free Google eBook (1879). A.-F. Høst, ed.

Books about him:

- Gerhard Grimm, "Johann Georg von Hahn (1811-1869) - Leben und Werk", Wiesbaden 1964
