= Daut Boriçi =

Albanian educator, cleric and activist involved in the Albanian National Awakening

Mulla Daut Boriçi
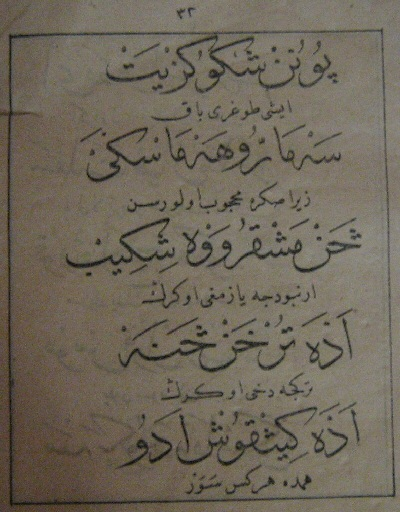
- Cover page of the 1861 primer
- Born: December 20, 1825; Shkodër, Ottoman Empire
- Died: November 2, 1896 (aged 70); Shkodër, Ottoman Empire
- Occupations: Müderris, imam, civil servant
- Years active: 1848-1894
- Notable work: The Arabic alphabet Albanian primer of 1869
- Father: Hadji Mustafa Refiki Efendi
- Relatives: Loro Boriçi, distant descendant, former football player

Religious life
- Religion: Islam
- Denomination: Sunni
- Jurisprudence: Hanafi
- Creed: Maturidi

Muslim leader
- Influenced by: Mullah Ferhat Salih Efendi Mullah Ahmet Hadri Mulla Sylo Fakoja
- Influenced: Sheh Shamia

Mulla Daut Efendi Boriçi (Turkish: Davut Şükrü Efendi, (7 cemazi-ül evvel 1242 H./7 December 1826 – 2 November 1896), was an Albanian scholar, müderris and nationalist figure of the Albanian National Awakening. For most of his life he was involved in the Ottoman educational system and is remembered for his Albanian primer in the Arabic alphabet of 1861, and his leadership during the League of Prizren.

== Life ==
Boriçi was born in Shkodër, back then center of the Pashalik of Scutari of the Ottoman Empire. His family originates from Boriç village near Antivari, today's Montenegro, having settled in Shkodër around 1650. His father was Hadji Mustafa Refiki efendi. At 8 years old he started his elementary education together with his brother Salih in the local school located in the "Old Bazaar" neighbourhood. There he was taught by Mulla Ferhati (1773-1844). During his youth, Boriçi also attended the Greek high school Zosimea in Ioannina for his education. In 1839 he started learning the Arabic language and studying theology with the müderrises of the Qafa medrese, founded by Mehmet Pasha Plaku and administered by Mustafa Pasha Bushatli. In 1848 he was appointed as imam in the Draçin Mosque (known as Mulla Dauti Mosque) where he took the name Mulla Dauti. He was influenced by other Muslim scholars such as Salih Efendi, Mullah Ahmet Hadri, and Mulla Sylo Fakoja, and became a member of the ulama. In 1850, he left for Istanbul and on 21 October of that year registered in the Çifte Baş Kurşun madrasa, one of the many founded by Mehmed II, followed by the Normal School. There he gave theology lessons to Riza Bey Bushati, son of Mustafa Pasha. The exact date when he finished his studies is unknown. He was first appointed somewhere in Anatolia but luckily managed to return to his hometown due to an exchange with another Çifte Baş Kurşun alumni. Returning in 1858 to Shkodër, he started teaching in the Ruzhdie (middle) school. Also, Riza Bey appointed him in charge of his family estates and income, with a payment of 5 Ottoman liras a month. In 1869 he was also elevated to inspector of the Ottoman Ministry of Education Inspectorate, responsible for elementary education in the area.

On 15 June 1878, right on the eve of the Congress of Berlin, a massive manifestation of the Shkodër population took place at the Old Bazaar. The manifestation came out with a petition which was sent to the Berlin Congress, protesting against any potential annexation of Albanian-populated territories by Montenegro. Daut's name was on the top list out of 380 signatures. His name would stand out as the leader of the League of Prizren branch of Shkodër, a committee of 20 people founded on 11 July 1878. The Committee played an important role in mobilizing Albanians, protesting transfers to Montenegro of Albanian land and assisting the resistance in Plav-Gusinje, Hoti, Gruda, Antivari, and Ulcinj.
With the suppression of the League by the Ottomans, Daut was recalled in Constantinople and later exiled in Anatolia where he would work as a teacher. After the accidental death of his wife, a petition from Shkodra leadership convinced the Ottoman authorities to give him amnesty. Daut returned to his hometown and was involved again in the education system.^{[a]} During 1882, Boriçi was Inspector of Education for the Scutari Vilayet and asked the Ottoman government for permission to allow the introduction of the Albanian language in state schools of Shkodër. In 1888 he still was in the position of inspector for schools in the Shkodër region. In 1892 he applied for retirement, which was approved only in 1894. Daut Boriçi died in Shkodër in November 1896 and was buried in the Luguçesma Mosque.

== Work ==
His main work was the Arabic Alphabet Turkish-Albanian primer, published in 1861 in Istanbul under a pen name and no date, in order to avoid any possible persecution due to Albanian writings being prohibited by that time. A second edition came out in 1869.
Another Albanian primer, different from the first, dates in 1881. Also, two unfinished works of his, an Albanian language grammar and a Turkish-Albanian dictionary, are preserved in the Albanian National Archives.

In addition, Molla Daut wrote an autobiography and two diaries, one of 1884-1850, and the other of 1893-1895 period.

== Notes ==
a.	Turkish scholar Selçuk Akşin Somel mentions an alternate but less possible outcome of his exile. Daut Efendi might have remained in Anatolia and served as Inspector of Education for the Vilayet of Van. This is based on the Henry Finnis Blosse Lynch's Armenia, travels and studies. Volume II: The Turkish Provinces of 1901. According to Lynch, the Vilayet of Van had as inspector a hard-working Albanian, with a good grasp of French. Numerous elementary but not only schools in the vilayet were established due to his efforts. Lynch visited eastern Anatolia in 1894 for the first time, by when Daut Efendi had already retired.
