= Rajko Nahtigal =

Slovenian scholar

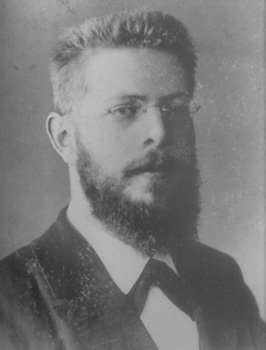

Rajko Nahtigal (April 14, 1877 – March 29, 1958) was a Slovenian scholar of Slavic languages and literature.

== Biography ==
Nahtigall was born in Novo Mesto and baptized Raimund August Nachtigall.

Nahtigal's research interests spanned Old Slavic language and literature, the history of Slavic languages in general, Old Russian literature, and the Russian language itself. He is recognized for his work on the Old Church Slavonic Glagolitic Sinai Prayer Book (Euchologium Sinaiticum) and The Tale of Igor's Campaign, an Old Russian epic.

Nahtigal authored numerous scholarly publications and was awarded the Prešeren Prize in 1953.
