= 1997 Albanian civil unrest =

1997 conflict in southeastern Europe

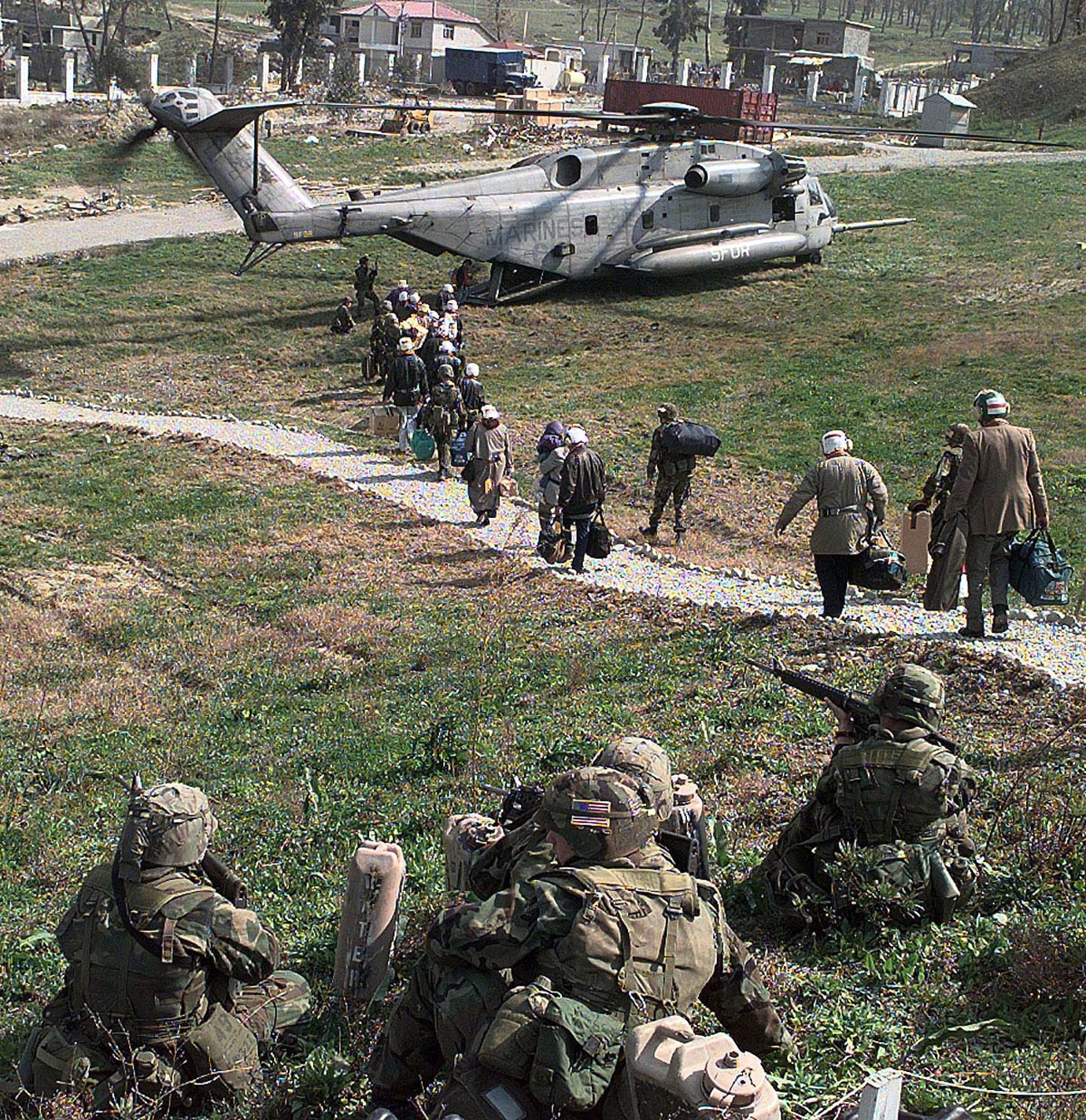
- Evacuation of United States citizens during Operation Silver Wake
Date	16 January – 11 August 1997 (6 months, 3 weeks and 5 days)
Location	Albania
Result	Albanian rebel victory: New parliamentary elections; Collapse of the Albanian Government; Tirana threatened; The entirety of Albania outside of Tirana falls under rebel control, and later falls into anarchy; End of Sali Berisha's presidency

Belligerents
Albanian rebels; Armed civilians who lost their properties; Armed gangs; Albanian Armed Forces, State Police and Republican Guard defectors; Salvation Committees; Socialist Party; Social Democratic Party	Government of Albania; Democratic Party; National Informative Service; Albanian Armed Forces; State Police; Republican Guard
	(United Nations) UN-authorized multinational protection force; Italy (lead nation); Austria; France; Germany; Greece; Romania; Spain; Turkey

Commanders and leaders
(Albania) Fatos Nano (Albania) Gramoz Ruçi (Albania) Skënder Gjinushi (Albania) Albert Shyti (Albania) Myrteza Çaushi (Albania) Altin Dardha	(Albania) Sali Berisha (surrendered) (Albania) Bashkim Gazidede (Albania) Safet Zhulali (Albania) Gazmend Braka
	(Italy) Oscar Luigi Scalfaro (Austria) Thomas Klestil (France) Jacques Chirac (Germany) Helmut Kohl (Greece) Costas Simitis (Romania) Emil Constantinescu (Spain) José María Aznar (Turkey) Süleyman Demirel

Strength
Unknown	30,000 soldiers 7,000+ peacekeepers

Casualties and losses
	(Albania) 2,000 civilians and members of the army, police, and secret police killed

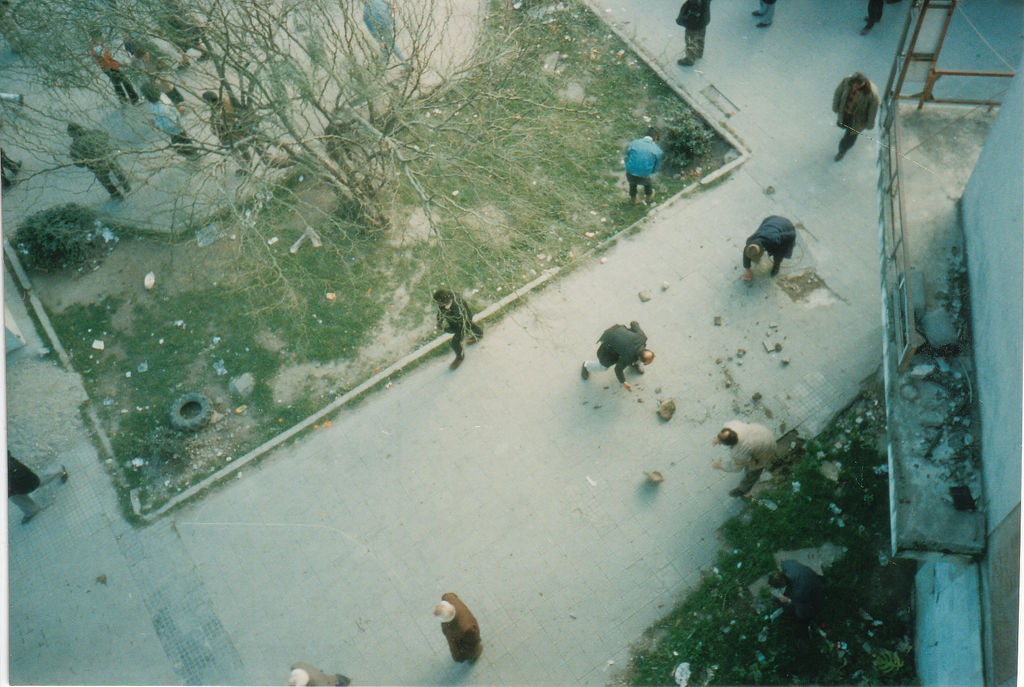
During the riots in the city of Vlorë, men broke rocks to hurl at police.

In 1997, Albania experienced widespread civil unrest due to economic problems stemming from the collapse of pyramid schemes. The large sums of money siphoned from the government to fund these schemes led to the collapse of the Democratic Party's government in January 1997. The conflict, which lasted until August 1997, resulted in the deaths of more than 2,000 people and the establishment of a new government as revolutionaries surrounded Tirana. Various sources also describe the ensuing violence as a rebellion or even a civil war.

By January 1997, Albanian citizens, who had lost a total of $1.2 billion, took to the streets in protest. Beginning in February, thousands of people launched daily protests demanding reimbursement from the government, which they believed had profited from the schemes. On 1 March, Prime Minister Aleksandër Meksi resigned, and on 2 March, President Sali Berisha declared a state of emergency.

On 11 March, the Socialist Party of Albania achieved a major victory when its leader, Bashkim Fino, was appointed prime minister. However, the transfer of power did not halt the unrest, and protests spread to northern Albania. Although the government quelled revolts in the north, its ability to maintain order began to collapse, especially in the southern half of the country, which fell under the control of rebels and criminal gangs.

By 13 March, all major population centers were engulfed in demonstrations, and foreign countries began evacuating their citizens. These evacuations included Operation Libelle, Operation Silver Wake, and Operation Cosmas, conducted by the German, American, and Greek military forces, respectively. The United Nations Security Council authorized a force of 7,000 troops under Resolution 1101 to direct relief efforts and restore order in Albania. The UN feared that the unrest could spread beyond Albania's borders and send refugees throughout Europe. Consequently, the US and NATO assisted in managing refugee camps, airlifting displaced populations across Europe, and securing the borders. On 15 April, a multinational peacekeeping force launched Operation Alba, which helped restore the rule of law in the country by late July.

After the rebellion ended, some of the weapons looted from Albanian army barracks and stockpiles were acquired by the Kosovo Liberation Army, with many making their way into the ensuing Kosovo War (1998–1999).

== Terminology ==
The period has been described as a civil war, on the brink of civil war, or near civil war, and as anarchy, while others argue that it was not.

== Causes ==
In 1992, the Democratic Party of Albania won the nation's first free elections, and Sali Berisha became president. In the mid-1990s, Albania was transitioning to a market economy after decades of a planned economy under the People's Socialist Republic of Albania. The rudimentary financial system soon became dominated by Ponzi schemes, and even government officials endorsed a series of pyramid investment funds.

By January 1997, the schemes, many of which were fronts for money laundering and arms trafficking, could no longer make payments, leading to their collapse. By then, the number of investors lured by the promise of getting rich quickly had grown to include two-thirds of Albania's 3 million population. It is estimated that close to $1.5 billion was invested in companies offering monthly interest rates ranging from 10% to 25%, while the average monthly income in the country was around $80. A significant number of Albanians had sold their homes to invest, and emigrants working in Greece and Italy transferred additional resources to the schemes.

=== 1996 elections ===
On 26 May 1996, general elections were held, and the conservative Democratic Party won by a large margin, securing 122 out of 140 seats in Parliament. The voter turnout was 89.1%. However, the opposition Socialists (PS) accused the government of election fraud and rejected the results. They proceeded to leave the ballot-counting process and boycott the parliament. Five months later, local elections were held on 20 October. The Democratic Party won again, but the Socialists rejected this result as well.

=== Pyramid schemes ===
The pyramid schemes began in 1991. The first scheme was that of Hajdin Sejdisë, who later fled to Switzerland with several million dollars. It was followed by "Sudja," run by shoe factory worker Maksude Kadëna in 1993, and then by the "Populli" foundations, run by an opposition politician, and "Xhaferri." By the end of 1996, the schemes had peaked, with very tempting interest rates; for example, Sudja offered 100% interest.

The schemes were not criticized immediately because a banking law adopted in 1994, based on advice from the International Monetary Fund (IMF), did not include a provision for the National Bank of Albania to supervise commercial banks. The IMF revised its advice two years later, after the consequences of the schemes had become apparent. Despite the IMF's recommendation to shut down these schemes, the government continued to allow them, often participating in them.

In January 1997, the schemes finally collapsed. On 22 January, the government froze the assets of the Xhaferri and Populli firms. "Gjallica," another firm, was on the verge of bankruptcy, while "Vefa," which had invested in Albanian hotels, the fuel industry, and factories, continued operating as usual.

The first public protests occurred on 16 January in the south of the country. On 19 January, demonstrators protested in the capital, Tirana, over the Sudja scheme. On 24 January, open rebellion effectively began. Thousands of people in the western town of Lushnjë marched on the city hall to protest the government's support for the schemes, and the protest quickly descended into violence. Police forces were subsequently routed, and both the city hall and the adjoining cinema were burned down.

One day later, on 25 January, Tritan Shehu, the leader of the Democratic Party, was sent to Lushnjë to resolve the situation. Upon arrival, he was captured by protesters and held hostage for several hours at the City Stadium, where he was also assaulted. Albanian Special Forces intervened to extract Shehu. By the morning of 26 January, every government institution in the city had been looted and destroyed, except for the Interior Ministry building, which was protected by the Director of Communications, seven of his engineers, and a guard who refused to abandon his post.

On 26–27 January, violence erupted in other southern towns, including the major port city of Vlorë. On 30 January, the Forum for Democracy was formed by opposition parties to try to lead the protests. Anger was also directed at President Sali Berisha and the government for allowing the schemes to continue, despite IMF advice. As allegations grew that Berisha and others in the government had personally profited from the schemes, many became convinced that the Democratic Party had to be removed by force, particularly in Vlorë.

On 4 February, the government began distributing reimbursements for some of the lost money at subsidiaries of the state-owned National Commercial Bank. Instead of quelling the protests, this move backfired, increasing public suspicion. A $550,000 check from the "Gjallica" firm, paid on 7 January to the Socialist Party, accelerated the firm's collapse. On 5 February, Gjallica declared bankruptcy, and on 6 February, violent protests resumed in Vlorë. On 9 February, state police were attacked in Vlorë, and a day later, in the south, a group of 50 Special Forces troops attacked and brutally dispersed protesters.

== Hunger strike at the University of Vlorë ==
On 20 February 1997, approximately 50 students at the University of Vlorë began a hunger strike on campus, demanding the government's resignation and the full return of invested money. On 22 February, the opposition Forum for Democracy declared its support for the strike. Students from Gjirokastër and Elbasan also came to show their support. They were then brought by FRESSH (the Youth Wing of the Socialist Party) activists from Vlorë to Tirana, the capital. In contrast, the students of the University of Luigj Gurakuqi in Shkodër did not participate in the protest. The Students' Union there declared that while "the students share the pain of the citizens of Vlorë in losing money in pyramid schemes, they believe that freedom and democracy, homeland, and nation have a higher price."

On 26 February, thousands of people gathered around the university building in Vlorë to defend it against a rumored attack by SHIK (Shërbimi Informativ Kombëtar), the national intelligence service. On the same day, a group of strikers requested additional medical assistance, raising doubts about the doctors available to them. On 27 February in Shkodër, Mayor Bahri Borici of the United Right declared his support for the hunger strike.

The next day was a decisive moment in Albanian history. After strengthening their perimeter around the university building, the rebel forces, without warning, attacked the SHIK building. In the ensuing fighting between the rebels and government forces, nine people—six officers and three civilians—were killed. This incident marked the beginning of a year of violence in southern Albania.

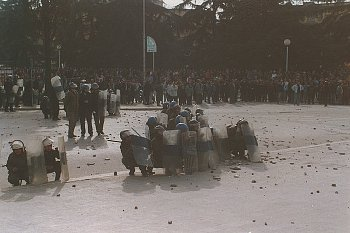
Protesters throwing stones at riot policemen

== Looting and opening of weapon depots ==
The so-called "opening of the depots" (Albanian: Hapja e depove) refers to the opening of the army's weapons depots in the country's northern regions, ordered by President Berisha. He justified this decision by citing the need to protect the population from the violence spreading from the south.

When southern Albanian bases were looted, it was estimated that, on average, every male aged ten and older had at least one firearm and ample ammunition. During the rebellion, 656,000 weapons of various types, 1.5 billion rounds of ammunition, 3.5 million hand grenades, and one million land mines were looted from army depots, according to the UNDP.

At the village of Selitë, near Burrel, a town 90 km north of the capital Tirana, an explosion occurred at an arms depot on 29 April after a group of villagers broke into the facility. The blast resulted in the deaths of 22 of the 200 village residents, most of whom were from the same family.

== Treasury robberies ==
The Krrabë Event (Albanian: Ngjarja e Krrabës) refers to the theft of gold from the Albanian state treasury on 24 April 1997. The treasury, hidden in tunnels near Krrabë outside Tirana, contained 340 kg of gold ingots, banknotes, and other items. The perpetrators, who were later tried and received prison sentences, were: Arian Bishqemi (7 years), Blerim Haka (3 years), Pellumb Dalti (6 years), Enver Hyka (8 years), and Ahmet Hyka (4 years).

The Robbery of the Northern State Treasury (Albanian: Grabitja e Thesarit të Veriut) was the theft of approximately $6 million from the Albanian state treasury in Shkodër in March 1997. A group of six people attacked the fortified building with an antitank weapon. Although the building contained $8 million, the robbers managed to escape with $6 million. The few police still in the city soon arrived at the scene and took control of the remaining assets.

Later, several witnesses saw the thieves meeting on the outskirts of Shkodër, where they divided the money among themselves. After the robbery, police and investigators began their inquiries in Shkodër. In the spring of 1998, more than a year later, the investigators closed the file and handed it to the police for further investigation.

== International intervention ==
On 28 March, the United Nations adopted Resolution 1101 to provide humanitarian aid to Albania. On 15 April, Operation Alba began to arrive and withdrew on 12 August. Approximately 7,000 soldiers from the multinational, Italian-led UN mission were deployed to Albania to restore order and the rule of law. The first forces were stationed in Durrës, and normality began to return to Tirana. An element of the Operation Alba forces remained in place to retrain the military to modern standards. From mid-May, this unit was joined by members of the WEU's Multinational Albanian Police element, which worked to restructure the police and the legislative base that had contributed to the crisis.

Involved were:

- Italian Armed Forces (Operation Alba), with Italy as the lead nation for Operation Alba
- (Greece) Greek Armed Forces (Operation Alba, Operation Cosmas) led by Lt Col Dimitrios Tzimanis
- (Romania) Romanian Armed Forces (Operation Alba)
- (Turkey) Turkish Armed Forces (Operation Alba)
- (Austria) Austrian Armed Forces (Operation Alba)
- (France) French Armed Forces (Operation Alba)
- (Germany) German Armed Forces (Operation Libelle) led by Col Henning Glawatz
- United States Armed Forces (Operation Silver Wake) led by Col Emerson Gardner

=== UN resolutions ===
These UNSC resolutions provide the basis for establishing and executing the mission (Resolution 1101) and its limited extension (Resolution 1114).

=== Evacuation operations ===
In March 1997, several nations launched evacuation missions to remove their nationals, embassy personnel, and numerous other civilians by air and sea. Italy conducted a series of rescue flights and sea evacuations without assigning an overarching name to these actions.

=== Peacekeeping ===
As part of a peacekeeping mission under UN Security Council Resolution 1101, a multinational protection force of more than 7,000 troops was deployed to Albania in mid-April. By mid-August 1997, it had largely restored public order and secured new elections under OSCE supervision.

== Snap elections ==
On 29 June 1997, Albania held a referendum on restoring the monarchy alongside early parliamentary elections. The referendum was rejected by 66.7% of the voters, while former Crown Prince Leka claimed that 65.7% had voted in favor. Meanwhile, the parliamentary elections resulted in an overwhelming victory for the opposition Socialist Party of Albania, which won 100 of the 151 seats, with a voter turnout of 72.6%.

== Armed groups ==
=== Gangs ===
Taking advantage of the chaotic situation, criminal groups armed themselves and took control of entire cities. Most leaders had been imprisoned in Greece but suddenly escaped and returned to Albania. The most notable case is that of Zani Çaushi, who escaped from the high-security prison in Larissa in February 1997 and, with a group of associates, established the gang of Çole in Vlorë.

In Vlorë, five gangs emerged, but two dominated the city: the Zani and Gaxhai gangs. The city's activity began at 10:00 a.m., when people gathered in Flag's Square to listen to the Committee of Rescue, and ended at 1:00 p.m. After that hour, the streets were deserted, with only gang members remaining active. The gangs announced through speakers and flyers that others should stay indoors due to impending fighting.

Each night brought attacks involving explosives and gunfire, leaving dozens dead. In Berat, Altin Dardha's rule was particularly harsh. In Lushnjë, Aldo Bare's gang held control, with one of their worst crimes being the beheading of an opponent. The cities ruled by gangs included Vlorë, Berat, Tepelenë, Memaliaj, Ballsh, Sarandë, Gjirokastër, Lushnjë, Pogradec, Çërrik, and Tropojë.

- Gang of Çole (Albanian: Banda e Çoles), based in Vlorë, was led by Myrteza Çaushi, known as "Partizan" and "Zani". Named after the Çole neighborhood in the eastern part of the city, which it controlled, the gang supported the Socialist Party.
- The Kakami gang, based in Vlorë and led by Fredi Nehbiu, controlled the western district of Babicë.
- Gang of Gaxhai (Albanian: Banda e Gaxhait), based in Vlorë and led by Gazmend "Gaxhai" Braka, was named after its leader. The gang consisted of members from Cerkovinë, Vlorë, and other southern cities. It was formed in March 1997 in Vlorë and was a primary rival of the Çole gang. The Gang of Gaxhai supported the Democratic Party (DP).
- Gang of Muko, based in Vlorë.
- Gang of Altin Dardha, based in Berat, was led by Altin Dardha.
- Gang of Aldo Bare, based in Lushnjë, was led by Aldo Bare.

=== Salvation Committees ===
Salvation Committees (also known as People's Committees or the Committee of Public Salvation [Albanian: Komiteti i Shpëtimit Publik]) were organizations formed during the unrest in Albania. Established in many regions across the country, these committees sought to usurp the functions of the Albanian state. They were particularly influential in the south, where, early in the crisis, local Salvation Committees merged to form the National Salvation Committee, which demanded the removal of President Sali Berisha.

Many of these committees were rooted in local organizations affiliated with the Socialist Party of Albania and saw themselves as protectors of democracy against authoritarian, one-person rule. The Albanian government, however, perceived them as reminiscent of Communist-era local party organizations and, therefore, as a potential threat of a return to Communist rule.

== Timeline ==
=== January ===
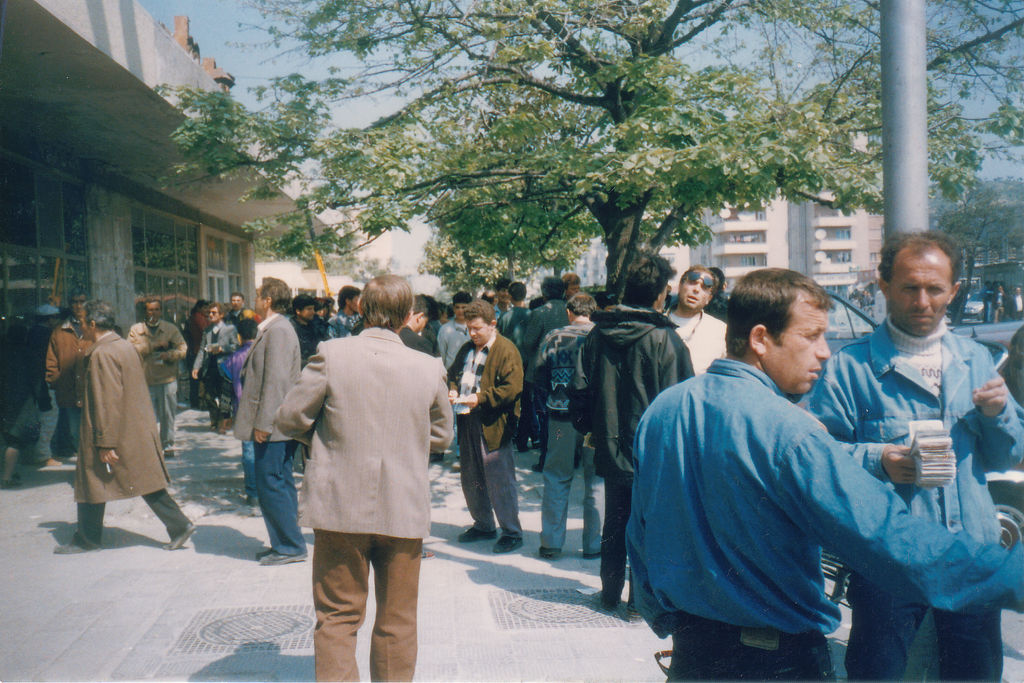
Money lenders in Vlora

- 8–16 January: Multiple pyramid schemes collapse, including "Kamberi," "Cenaj," "Silva," "Malvasia," "Kambo," "Grunjasi," "Dypero," "Bashkimi," "Beno," "Pogoni," "B&G," "Kobuzi," "Arkond," "Adelin," "A. Delon," "Agi," "M. Leka Company," "Global Limited Co.," "Çashku," and "Sudja." The city of Vlora, a major hub for these schemes, was severely impacted. The government froze the assets of "Vefa Holding" and "Gjallica."
- 15 January: Hundreds gathered at the residence of Maksude Kadëna, the owner of "Sudja." Among the crowd were opposition leaders. They confronted the police.

=== Mass protests ===
- 16 January: Maksude Kadëna, owner of "Sudja," was arrested. The Socialist newspaper "Voice of the People" wrote, "From Tirana to Vlora, the country is in revolt," referring to the protests by about 6,000 people in Vlora's Flag Square.
- 18 January: An emergency meeting of the Democratic National Council resulted in the creation of a parliamentary committee to investigate the situation.
- 19 January: A protest against "Sudes" was held in the square. Opposition leaders attempted to direct the protest against the government.
- 20 January: 1,500 people gathered at the bankrupt "People-Xhaferri Democracy" scheme to reclaim their money.
- 22 January: The trial began against the so-called "charitable donations" (which were actually pyramid schemes) "People's Democracy-Xhaferri" and "People," both run by individuals with close ties to the Communist State Security (Rrapush Xhaferri and Bashkim Driza). Kërxhaliu, the administrator of "Gjallica," was arrested.
- 23 January: Police arrested 50 employees of "People" and "Xhaferri." The newspaper Albania wrote, "Surely, this is the work of Hajdin Sejdia. He left with several million dollars in 1991 but returned unexpectedly in 1996 and began distributing money to creditors. The truth is that he received $3 million from 'Xhaferri' and 'People,' which led to increased public confidence in these schemes. As a result of Sejdia's arrival, there was an increase of tens of millions of dollars in deposits to these schemes within 2–3 months. This prevented the premature failure of these schemes."
- 24 January: Demonstrators in Lushnja, angry about the arrest of Xhaferri, burned the City Hall and a cinema.
- 25 January: Demonstrators from surrounding villages attacked and destroyed state institutions in Lushnja. Tritan Shehu was held hostage for several hours at the City Stadium. The city of Lushnja was set on fire by the crowd, led by local Socialist Party leaders. Additional clashes occurred in Elbasan, Memaliaj, Laç, and Kuçovë.
- 26 January: A demonstration by the Socialist Party in downtown Tirana escalated into a violent clash between police and opposition supporters. The police injured some Socialist leaders. The opposition destroyed the National History Museum, the Palace of Culture, the Et'hem Bey Mosque, and the Municipality of South Tiranë. An angry mob also burned the city hall. In Patos, terrorist groups set fire to Albpetrol.
- 27 January: An angry crowd burned the hall of Peshkopi and the police station. Four policemen were seriously injured.
- 29 January: Police arrested 140 people in Berat and 20 in Poliçan for involvement in violent demonstrations and illegal activities.
- 30 January: The Forum for Democracy was formed by opposition parties, led by Daut Gumeni, Fatos Lubonja from the Albanian Helsinki Committee (known for anti-Berisha positions), and Kurt Kola, president of the Association of the Politically Persecuted (also associated with "the people"). The Forum soon began organizing anti-government protests.
- 31 January: The newspaper Koha Jonë urged the creditors of "Gjallica" to visit the firm on 6 February to retrieve their money. The goal was to incite violent demonstrations at "Gjallica."

==== February ====
- 4 February: Partial returns of deposits began as per a government decision. The opposition criticized the Democrats for delaying the start of the process. The "Forum for Democracy" proposed creating a technical government to resolve the crisis.
- 5 February: The bankrupt firm "Gjallica" was taken over by the former State Security. The cities most affected by the firm's bankruptcy were Vlora ($145 million USD) and Kukës ($16 million USD). Protests began in Vlora.
- 6 February: Thousands joined violent protests in Vlora. Kukës formed a "Committee" with the firm's creditors to seek a legal solution to the issue and to become shareholders of the firm. Similar committees were established in Gjirokastër and Berat.
- 7 February: Protesters block the road in Memaliaj.
- 8 February: Anti-government protests continue in Vlora.
- 9 February: An armed crowd attacks the police station in Vlora, resulting in one death and one injury. The Forum for Democracy declares that the only solution to the crisis is continued protests against the government.
- 10 February: Violence continued in the south. Armed groups burned the Democratic Party of Albania (DPA) headquarters, and both the President and government resigned. A mob of thousands attacked a group of about 50 Special Forces troops, with EuroNews broadcasting footage of the police siege. The rebellion spread throughout southern Albania, and a state of emergency was declared for the region.
- 11 February: Artur Rustemi, the first victim of the rebellion, was buried in Vlora. His funeral turned into an anti-government demonstration that resulted in the burning of the ADP headquarters in Vlora. Alarm spread over the lack of bread in the city—the "Forum for Democracy" called for dialogue with President Berisha.
- 12–15 February: Multiple kidnappings occurred. Schools were closed, and shops were allowed to sell goods only until 9 o'clock.
- 13 February: Kurt Kola was accused of being a traitor and collaborator with communist executioners.
- 14 February: Anti-government protests developed in Fier.
- 17 February: The Legality Movement condemned the violence and refused dialogue with the "Forum for Democracy." Ministers met in Tirana.
- 18 February: President Berisha met with citizens of Lushnja, promising to do everything to resolve the crisis. The National Front demanded the resignation of the government.
- 20 February: A hunger strike began at the University Ismail Kamal in Vlora, with approximately 50 students demanding the resignation of the government. The Forum for Democracy organized a violent demonstration in Tirana, resulting in five policemen being seriously injured. A group of students met with President Berisha in Vlora and agreed to resolve the crisis peacefully.
- 22 February: The trial of the leaders of Gjallicës began. The Forum for Democracy supported the student hunger strike in Vlora.
- 24 February: Angry crowds attacked state institutions in the south.
- 26 February: As part of a presidential tour of areas affected by the crisis, Berisha met with citizens in Gjirokastër and promised to make all efforts to resolve the situation. Thousands surrounded the Ismail Qemali University to protect against a rumored "attack" by state forces.

=== 10-day civil war ===
- 28 February: Forty-six students at the University of Gjirokastër joined a hunger strike, with demands similar to those of students in Vlora. Armed crowds attacked and burned a SHIK branch, resulting in the deaths of three agents who were burned alive and three others who were attacked and killed by the crowd. Additionally, three members of the crowd were killed.

==== March ====
- 1 March: The city of Vlora had no functioning government and was controlled by gangs and traffickers. A mass exodus began. In Lushnjë, police were brutally beaten. News of the massacre of SHIK officers shocked the government. Rebels took control of the Albanian Navy's Pasha Liman Base, a significant symbol of resistance. In response, the government declared a state of emergency and sent more troops to the areas around Vlora and Tepelena. Rebels set up cannons at the entrance of the city, pointing them towards Tirana. A massive explosion destroyed an arms storage facility. Himarë was on fire, including police buildings in Gjirokastër.
- 2 March: Alexander Meksi's government resigned after failing to resolve the crisis. The event was celebrated in Vlora and the south, with thousands firing AK-47s into the air as a sign of victory. Parliament appointed the chief of the Gazideden Union to restore order. Gazidede immediately ordered the indefinite closure of schools throughout the country and imposed restrictions on the press and consumer goods. In Kavaja, a bastion of the PD, over 5,000 people voluntarily armed themselves to defend the city from a potential attack by armed gangs. Italian news agency ANSA commented: "The whole scenario is emerging as a politico-military strategy rather than a manifestation of spontaneous popular action. Special machines have been used for days to gather people in Flag Square."
- 3 March: President Berisha was re-elected with votes from DP members of parliament alone, which led to massive riots in southern and central Albania. Warehouses exploded, and the remaining military bands formed committees. The city of Saranda was captured by rebels, with fighters from Vlora arriving by boat and burning every government building in the city, including the library. In Vlora, a local detention facility was broken into, and more than 400 guns were seized. Gunmen also burned down the Vocational Training Centre in Vlora. Meanwhile, SHIK attempted to contain the rebellion to Vlora, Saranda, and Delvina to prevent it from spreading further. Destruction and killings continued throughout southern Albania. The seven-million-dollar Vocational Training Centre in Vlora was destroyed, costing the Albanian government heavily. A group of approximately 100 "Adipetrol" members was held responsible, and their compound in Gjirokastra was raided. Masked raiders captured a warship, and rebels attacked Saranda, burning police and government buildings. Criminals engineered a prison break, releasing hundreds of prisoners, seizing 400 weapons, and setting fire to the town library. In Kuçovë, a bread shortage was announced. The army regained control of Fier and began disarming the population.
- 4 March: The Committee of Public Salvation was formed in Vlora, headed by Albert Shyti. This committee began to act as a parallel government. Snipers occupied every building in Vlora, and barricades were erected on every street to prevent attacks by SHIK. The Mifoli Bridge over the River Vjosë was blocked and mined, becoming a symbol of the rebellion as it separated the two parts of Albania. As students ended their hunger strike, gunmen in Saranda used a navy craft to plunder weapons caches. Gangs patrolled the sea using Albanian Navy ships. Outside Saranda, one SHIK member was burned alive, another was taken hostage, and two others escaped. Fifty soldiers joined the rebels, and two Albanian Air Force pilots defected, flying their planes to Italy, claiming they were ordered to attack civilians. Gazidede's plan to isolate the insurgency in Vlora failed as it spread across the south. After fierce fighting in Delvina, the rebels forced the army to pull back. In Saranda, rebels set up roadblocks. More depots exploded in the south. Rebels placed snipers in mansions, locked the Mifoli Bridge, and raised barricades to prevent military and SHIK entry. In Shkodra, the army capitulated, and the hunger strike ended. In Saranda, organized gangs raided an Albanian Navy base, capturing thousands of weapons. The Committee of Public Salvation in Vlore, led by Albert Shyti, began to act as a parallel government, conducting a "de facto" coup. Shyti's main collaborator was Myrteza Çaushi, known as Zani, "the strongman of Vlora." Following the example set in Vlora, Shyti established "Salvation Committees" throughout Albania. Demonstrators succeeded in overpowering the Vlora police largely due to the support and organization of local crime crime bosses and former members of the Communist-era secret police (Sigurimi), who saw this as an opportunity to undermine the new political system. Albert Shyti, returning from Greece with a private arsenal, set himself up as the head of the Vlora "Salvation Committees," a pattern that was replicated in other southern towns and cities.
- 5 March: Warehouses in Memaliaj and other locations were blown up. Rebels burned police buildings in these cities. Greek TV channel "Mega" reported, "Today, armed groups in southern Albania raised the banner of Northern Epirus for the first time. They demand the separation of the southern part from the rest of the country, ranging from Tepelena, thus proclaiming the autonomy of southern Albania. Albania's longstanding issue has been north–south autonomy, which is divided along the Shkumbin River."
- 6 March: President Berisha held a meeting with representatives of political parties to sign a statement condemning the massive plunder and destruction of military warehouses and calling for the surrender of weapons. Six hours later, the leaders of the Socialist Party (SP) and the Democratic Alliance Party (DAP) denied any responsibility or obligation toward the statement they had previously described as a "political success." Greek TV channel "Sky" News reported, "A few minutes after the meeting, the leaders of armed groups in Saranda emerged, announcing their decision to attack Gjirokastër that night. They will not leave and are anxiously awaiting the popular trial of three prisoners captured in Saranda's main square, who allegedly attacked SHIK employees and northern ethnic groups, increasing the victim count in Vlora."
- 7 March: Rebels from Saranda, in collaboration with local army forces, entered Gjirokastër and took some Albanian Special Forces troops hostage. The leaders of the revolt in Gjirokastër were members of the PAD, including Arben Imami (later appointed Defense Minister in 2009) and Ridvan Pëshkëpia. With the fall of Gjirokastër, the entire south of the country was out of government control. Weapons continued to spread across the country. Tirana's Rinas International Airport was attacked by villagers from the surrounding area, and the Agricultural University of Tirana was looted. Albanian Army soldiers defected to the rebels in Gjirokastër.
- 8 March: President Berisha organized a meeting with all parties concerned about the creation of the new government. The leaders of the Gjirokastër division had surrendered and taken control of the rebellion in that city. Gangs kidnapped several auxiliary military forces from Tirana and blocked several tanks and a helicopter. At midnight, they attacked and sabotaged a milk processing factory in Libohovë.
- 9 March: A Government of National Reconciliation was established in Tirana, headed by Gjirokastër mayor Bashkim Fino. The new government called on former army members to help restore peace and order. President Berisha appeared on VAT to address the nation, urging "reconciliation, faith, unity, and calm."
- 10 March: In Gramsh, rebels attacked the police building and took control of the streets in Fier. Berat fell into the hands of gangs and became a major center of rebellion, alongside Vlora. Poliçan, Këlcyra, and Skrapar were also seized. In Kuçovë, rebels seized 19 MiG aircraft. The "Vlora Rescue Committee" welcomed the agreement reached on 9 March. The American Foundation for Eastern Europe sent a letter to the Albanian Embassy in the U.S., stating, "It is great naivety to not understand that the Committee of Vlora and its leaders are inspired by a communist mafia-type organization like the KGB." The letter concluded: "Mr. Berisha must decide, by any means necessary, to restore the rule of law, including the use of military force if needed." On the evening of 10 March, the U.S. Embassy also welcomed the agreement. Unopposed on the battlefield, the rebels in the south continued their wave of destruction. They attacked a local police station in Gramsh, took control of the streets in Fier, and seized Berat. Poliçan and Këlcyra were taken over by criminal gangs, and in Kuçovë, the rebels commandeered 19 Soviet-made MiG combat aircraft. The rebellion began to spread to the north.
- 11 March: The "Committee of the South" was established, rejecting Berisha and calling for the return of lost funds. The committee proposed forming a new state separate from Tirana. Army depots in Kukës were looted, and armed looters damaged state institutions. The citizens of Kukës temporarily abandoned the town following an announcement that the Serbian army had crossed the border. The revolt spread northward; the army capitulated in many areas, and a large weapons depot was captured in Shkodra. Prominent organized crime figures escaped from prison, formed gangs, and effectively took control of numerous regions. Gangs looted banks, took hostages, and robbed businesses. The chaos left the country in complete paralysis, except for the capital, Tirana.

=== Descent into anarchy ===
- 12 March: President Berisha decreed the formation of a Government of National Reconciliation. Meanwhile, the revolt intensified in the South.
- 13 March: President Berisha and Prime Minister Fino requested international military assistance as Tirana faced imminent invasion by the rebels. A curfew was declared, and several hundred volunteers, mainly from the North, protected the capital. Berisha described it as the most dangerous night of his life. Fatos Nano and Ramiz Alia were among the last to emerge from prison. Revolts continued in the South, with rebels burning a police building in Lezha. Ismail Kadare addressed Albanians via Voice of America, stating, "The clock has turned back to Albania's civil war between nationalists and communists in the years 1943–44." He criticized foreign media and the political elite while calling for calm to overcome the crisis. The French news agency Agence-France Presse reported, "The riots in Albania were a military coup." The United States began Operation Silver Wake to evacuate civilians and embassy personnel from Tirana.
- 14 March: Franz Vranitski was appointed to address the Albanian crisis. The U.S. Ambassador appeared on VAT, stating that the diplomatic mission would not leave and that the American people supported the Albanian people. In Tirana, the population began to disarm. A tobacco plantation and a Coca-Cola factory were attacked. The chief of SHIK resigned. Rebels occupied the port of Durrës. The German evacuation mission, Operation Libelle, was carried out for civilians and embassy staff in Tirana. The Greek government conducted Operation Cosmas to evacuate civilians and embassy staff from the port of Durrës, despite the presence of thousands of gunmen in the area.
- 15 March: Rinas Airport was recovered by the government. Parliament approved the "Government of National Reconciliation." A "Committee for the Protection of Durrës" was formed.
- 16 March: A massive rally in Tirana called for peace and cooperation. A day of national mourning was declared in honor of the victims of the rebellion. In Fier, radioactive material was looted. President Berisha decreed an amnesty for 51 prisoners.
- 17 March: A presidential decree released Fatos Nano, the opposition leader who had been jailed since 1993 on corruption charges. The President left the country in a U.S. military helicopter. Fatos Nano held a press conference to express his support for the new government.
- 18 March: A Committee for the Rescue of North and Middle Albania threatened the new government if it recognized the committees of the South. As a result, the government did not recognize any committees.
- 20 March: The Assembly of Public Salvation Committee demanded the removal of Berisha and proposed the creation of a Federation of the South. Rinas Airport reopened.
- 21 March: Greece sought to enter Albanian territory under the pretext of protecting minorities. Berisha requested Turkish military aid. The Turkish government stated that if Greek troops entered Albania, Turkey would immediately invade Greece and capture Athens. Turkey demanded that the mistakes made in Bosnia not be repeated in Albania. At a hearing in the Albanian Parliament, the head of Gazidede Union accused anti-Albanian Greek circles, Albanian Socialists, the military, and criminals. He stated, "The integrity of Albania no longer exists" and "the rebellion was directed towards the destruction of any historic and cultural facility, with the long-term goal of eradicating any historical evidence of Albanian autochthony."
- 22 March: Armed gangs ruled Saranda and Gjirokastra under a regime of violence and terror, resulting in dozens of deaths.
- 23 March: Control of the Port of Durrës was reestablished. Berat was under gang rule, with numerous attacks attempted using explosives.
- 25 March: Three policemen were killed in Vlora.
- 26 March: The American evacuation of civilians, Operation Silver Wake, ended, and most U.S. Marines returned to their ships offshore.
- 27 March: The Democratic Party claimed that relations between the Greek and Albanian peoples had always been excellent, and that Greek extremist groups did not represent all Greek people.

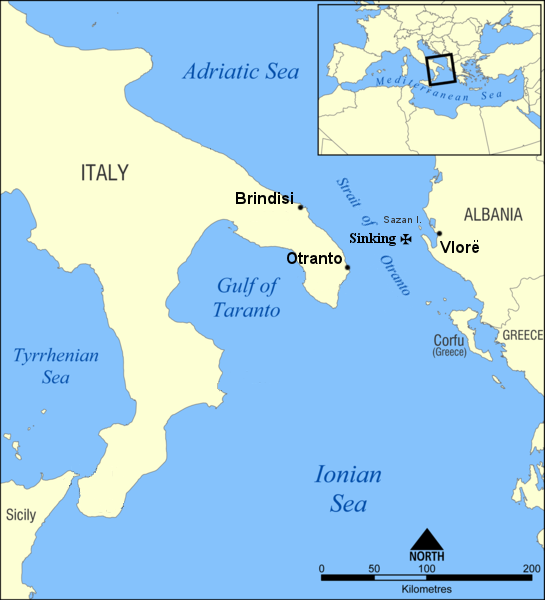
The Otranto tragedy

- 28 March: The Otranto tragedy occurred when an Albanian ship operated by a Vlora gang was mistakenly rammed and sunk by an Italian naval vessel in the Otranto Channel. Eighty-two refugees died. A "National Assembly of Committees of the South" was convened, with opposition political figures in attendance. They demanded the President's resignation and rejected the "Government of National Reconciliation." The leaders of these committees were former exponents of the Enver Hoxha regime. In the village of Levan, the largest massacre of the conflict occurred, with 24 people killed in clashes between Roma and a gang, bringing the total death toll to over 110. The United Nations adopted Resolution No. 1101 for humanitarian aid.
- 29 March: Five people were killed in the South and in Berat.
- 30 March: President Berisha and Prime Minister Fino sent condolences to the families of the Otranto victims. Albania requested an international investigation into the incident.
- 31 March: National mourning was declared in honor of the Otranto victims. Ismail Kadare stated in the Italian media that he was "shocked by this tragedy" and that the authority of the government and the President needed to be restored.

==== April ====
- 1 April: Leaders of the Democratic Party debated the resignation of Berisha and Shehu. Fino urged the Socialist Party to withdraw from the 28 March agreement with the Committee of the South.
- 3 April: The police made gains in restoring order in Tirana, while Special Forces took control of Berat.
- 4 April: The U.S. Embassy stated that it would not meet with any Salvation Committee and that the only legitimate institutions are the government and the president.
- 5 April: Armed gangs took control of Pogradec.
- 7 April: Dozens of people were wounded and 5 killed, including two children, in Fier. The Haklaj family led the riots. Additionally, 3 people were killed in Durrës.
- 8 April: In Gramsh, clashes broke out between local gangs and those from Laçi. The city had become a center for arms sales.
- 12 April: Leka Zog arrived in Tirana with the royal court. Dozens of mentally ill patients escaped from Elbasan.
- 13 April: Italian Prime Minister Romano Prodi visited Vlora with Albanian Zani Çaushi serving as his bodyguard.
- 15 April: Operation Alba, an international force of 7,000 troops under Italian command, began arriving in Albania. The first forces were deployed in Durrës. Normalcy returned to Tirana, and a successful operation was conducted in Gramsh to apprehend criminals and collect looted weapons.
- 17 April: Political parties agreed to hold elections on 29 June.
- 18 April: A bomb exploded in the courtyard of the University of Elbasan.
- 19 April: A rocket exploded at a weapons depot in Gjirokastra. Fino met with Leka Zog.
- 21 April: Multinational forces were deployed in Vlora. Criminal gangs attacked and devastated the city of Gramsh and terrorized citizens in Çorovodë.
- 22 April: A bomb exploded near the former "Flora" location in Tirana.
- 23 April: International forces chose not to work with any "Committee of the South."
- 24 April: The police station in Elbasan was attacked. Leka Zog visited Vlora.
- 26 April: The Council of Europe demanded the disarmament of "illegal" Salvation Committees. Four children were injured by a bomb in Gjirokastra. In Shpërthehen, 35 meters of train tracks were demolished.
- 28 April: In Lushnjë, a crowd of approximately 4,000 gathered to protest. The protest, initiated by the Committee of Public Salvation, included demands for Berisha's resignation, reform of the electoral process, emergency parliamentary elections scheduled for 2001, and reimbursement of 100% of all financial losses. Leaders of the Committee joined the rally.
- 29 April: Schools reopened in the North. Vlora remained under the control of gangs.
- 30 April: An explosion at a weapons depot in Burrel left 27 people dead. Three warehouses also exploded in Berat.

==== May ====
- 4 May: Dozens were killed in Shkodra, Berat, Tirana, and Durrës.
- 10 May: Special Forces clashed with armed gangs in Gramsh. The Gramsh Rescue Committee prevented the distribution of newspapers in the city.
- 14 May: Kakavisë was attacked at the border. Remnants of the attack blocked the Berat-Lushnjë road. A military post in Berat was also attacked.
- 15 May: A warehouse in Gjirokastra exploded, injuring 14 people and killing 4 others. An entire family was also killed in Pogradec.
- 19 May: Violence continued in the south, with ongoing killings in Vlora. In Memaliaj, the police and the Rescue Committee joined forces against one of the gangs.
- 21 May: Attacks on bridges in Gjirokastra continued. Violence persisted in Saranda, Vlora, Shkodër, and Durrës.
- 23 May: In Cërrik, gangs attacked a Special Forces armored vehicle. Six members of the Republican Guard were killed in grenade attacks, and three others were captured and taken hostage.

==== June ====
- 17 June: Massacre at Ura Vajgurore.
- ? June: The Democratic Party leadership was unable to conduct a normal campaign in southern Albania. Their campaign was marred by riots in those cities, resulting in over 60 deaths.
- 29 June: Parliamentary elections were held. The Socialist Party allies won, while the Democrats suffered their biggest loss in history. Many members of the "Salvation Committees" supported leftist candidates, although they had promised not to take government positions until the crisis was resolved. On election day, a referendum was also held on the form of governance. The Republic prevailed over the monarchy with 65% of the votes.

==== July ====
- 3 July: Pretender to the throne King Leka I organized a demonstration accusing the electoral commission of rigging the referendum results, in which two-thirds of voters had rejected the proposed restoration of the monarchy. Five people were killed in a clash between demonstrators and police.
- July: Gangs continued to rule cities with fear and terror. Murders, robberies, and trafficking in weapons, people, and drugs increased.
- 24 July: Berisha resigned, having promised that if the Socialists won, he would step down because he could not endure "institutional cohabitation" with them. The National Assembly elected Rexhep Meidani as the new president. Massive gunfire in Tirana marked Berisha's resignation, and major fighting came to an end.

==== August ====
- 11 August: The military forces of Operation Alba left the country.

== Casualties ==
According to Christopher Jarvis, there were 2,000 people killed. Fred C. Abrahams reported that between March and May 1997, approximately 1,600 people were killed, most of them in shootouts between rival gangs. An UNIDIR document claimed that more than 2,000 people were killed in March alone.

== Aftermath ==
Damage from the rebellion was estimated at $200 million, with approximately 3,700 to 5,000 people wounded. Lawsuits were filed against the leaders of the rogue firms. Various members of the government, including Safet Zhulali and Agim Shehu, were sentenced in absentia.

In the June and July 1997 elections, Berisha and his party were voted out of power, and the leftist coalition led by the Socialist Party won. The Socialist Party elected Rexhep Meidani as President of Albania. All UN forces had left Albania by 11 August.

== See also ==
- 1998 Albanian coup d'état attempt
- List of massacres in Albania
- Kosovo War

== Sources ==
- Nohlen, Dieter; Stöver, Philip (2010). Elections in Europe: A data handbook. ISBN 978-3-8329-5609-7.
- Tripodi, Paolo (2016). "The Collapse of Albania". In Rich, Paul B. (ed.). Warlords in International Relations. Springer. ISBN 978-1-349-27688-2.
- Abrahams, Fred C. (2016). Modern Albania: From Dictatorship to Democracy in Europe. NYU Press. ISBN 978-1-4798-3809-7.
- Arsovska, Jana (2015). Decoding Albanian Organized Crime: Culture, Politics, and Globalization. University of California Press. ISBN 9780520282803.
- Mugumya, Geofrey (2005). From Exchanging Weapons for Development to Security Sector Reform in Albania: Gaps and Grey Areas in Weapon Collection Programmes Assessed by Local People. United Nations Publications UNIDIR. ISBN 978-92-9045-173-0.
- Daniel Vaughan-Whitehead (1999). Albania in Crisis: The Predictable Fall of the Shining Star. Edward Elgar. ISBN 978-1-84064-070-0.
- Albania (PDF) (Report). House of Commons Library. 14 May 1997. Research Paper 97/59.
- Transition. Vol. 4. Open Media Research Institute. 1997.
- “Rënia e Demokracisë”, Afrim Krasniqi, 1998, Eurorilindja
- “Unë e pashë kush e dogji Vlorën”, Gëzim Zilja, 2000, Pelioni
- Fondi Monetar Ndërkombëtar, Ngritja dhe rënia e piramidave shqiptare
- Impakti i piramidave në Shqipëri
- Piramidat shqiptare
- Banka Botërore, Shqipëria nën hijen e skemave piramidale Archived 4 June 2011 at the Wayback Machine
