= Strait of Otranto =

Strait between Italy and Albania

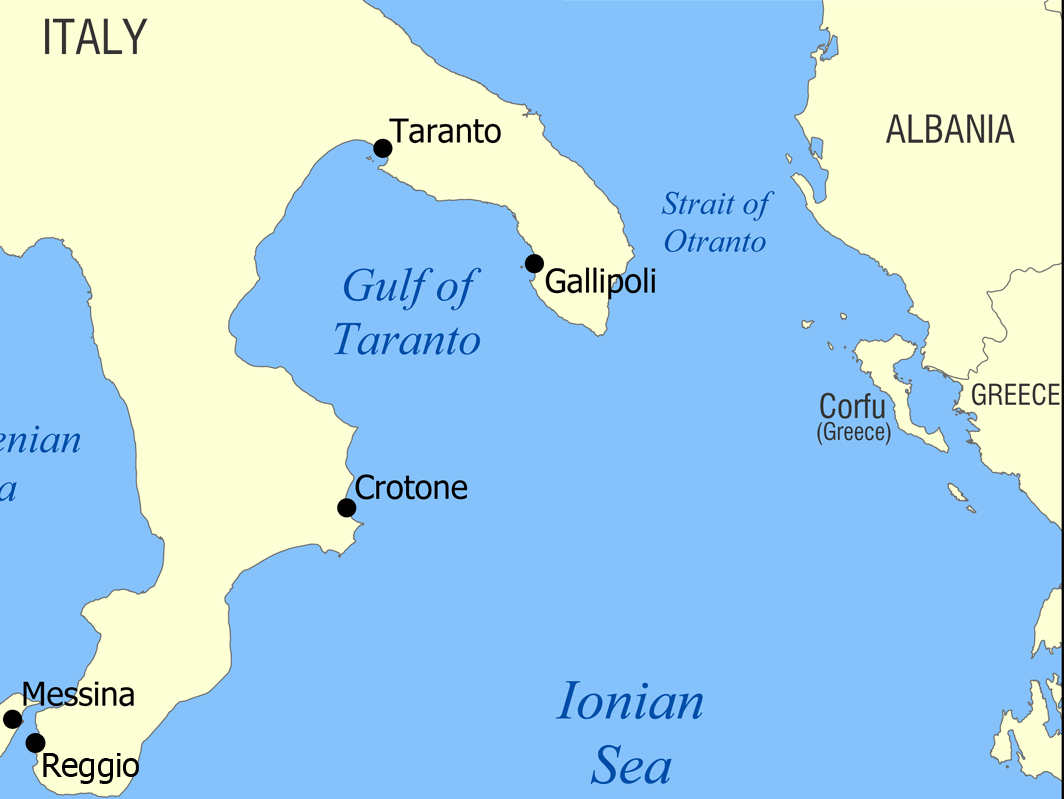
- Map showing the location of the Strait of Otranto

- Location within Europe Location within Italy Location within Albania
- Coordinates: 40°13′10″N 18°55′32″E
- Basin countries: Italy, Albania
- Min. width: 72 km (45 mi)
- Average depth: 18 m (59 ft)

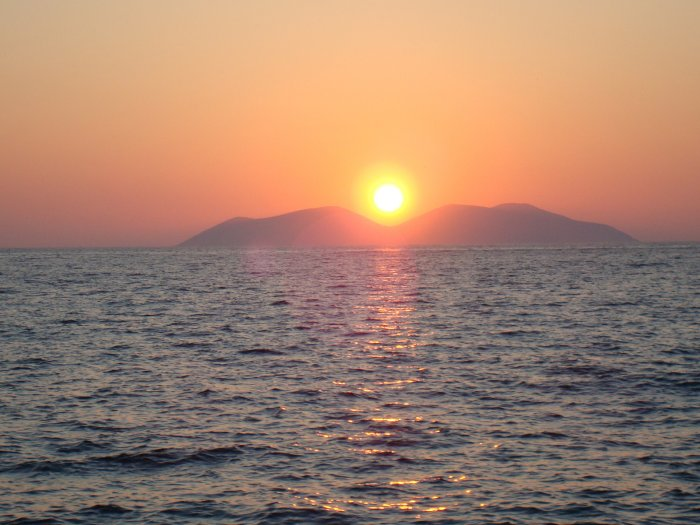
Bay of Vlora

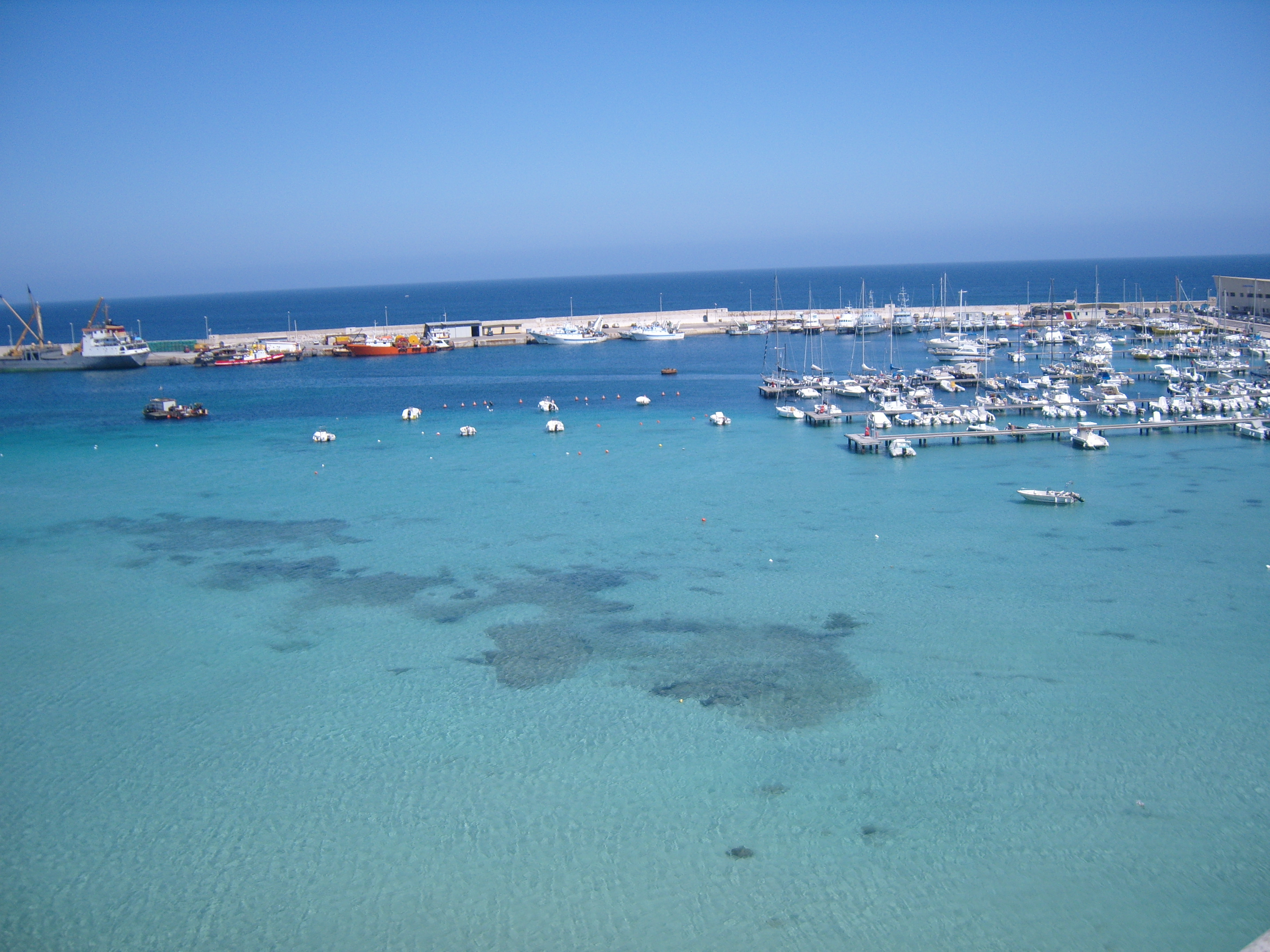
Otranto harbour

The Strait of Otranto connects the Adriatic Sea with the Ionian Sea and separates Italy from Albania. Its width between Punta Palascìa, eastern Salento, and Karaburun Peninsula, western Albania, is less than 72 km (45 miles; 39 nautical miles). The strait is named after the Italian city of Otranto.

== History ==
Since ancient times, the Strait of Otranto was of vital strategic importance. The Romans used it to transport their troops eastwards. The legions marched to Brundisium (now Brindisi), had only a one-day sea voyage to modern Albania territory and then could move eastwards following the Via Egnatia.

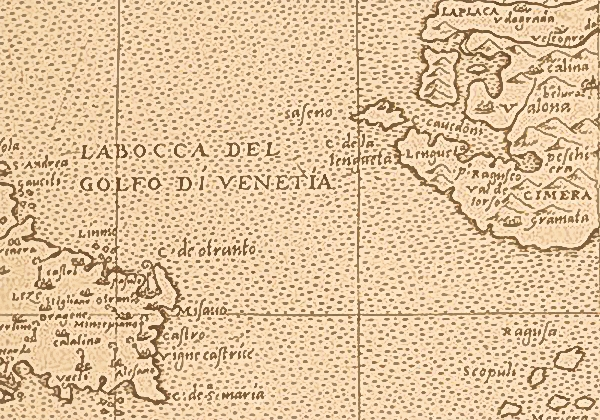
The Strait of Otranto on a map from the early 17th century

=== World War I ===
During World War I, the strait was of strategic significance. The Allied navies of Italy, France, and Great Britain, by blockading the strait, mostly with light naval forces and lightly armed fishing vessels known as drifters, hindered the cautious Austro-Hungarian Navy from freely entering the Mediterranean Sea, and effectively kept them out of the naval theatre of war. The blockade was known as the 'Otranto Barrage'.

However, the barrage was notoriously ineffective against the German and Austrian U-boats operating out of the Adriatic, which were to plague the Allied powers for most of the war throughout the Mediterranean.

=== After the fall of the Iron Curtain ===
In 1992, Albania and Italy signed a treaty that delimited the continental shelf boundary between the two countries in the Strait. Whatsoever the administration rights over the Strait were given to Albania not changing much from the former deal of Otranto.

In 1997 and 2004, nearly 100 people died trying to illegally cross the strait following the 1997 unrest in Albania and poor economic conditions in the Tragedy of Otranto and the Karaburun tragedy.

In 2006, the Albanian government imposed a moratorium on motor-powered sailing boats on all lakes, rivers, and seas of Albania to curb organized crime. The only exemptions to the rule are government-owned boats, foreign-owned boats, fishing boats, and jet boats. In 2010, the moratorium was extended until 2013.

== Swims ==
The first recorded successful swim across the Strait of Otranto was achieved on July 14, 1979, when italian long-distance swimmer, Paolo Pinto, swam from Italy to the Greek island of Fanos in about 40 hours and 42 minutes.

Eva Buzo, a 36-year-old Sydney-based lawyer and long-distance swimmer, became the first woman to complete the swim. In August 2024 it took her 35 hours to cross 92 kilometres from Lecce in Italy to Vlora in Albania.

== See also ==
- Otranto Barrage
- Otranto Raid
- Battle of the Strait of Otranto (disambiguation)
- Karaburun tragedy
