= Operation Alba =

Multinational peacekeeping force sent to Albania in 1997

- Part of 1997 Albanian civil unrest
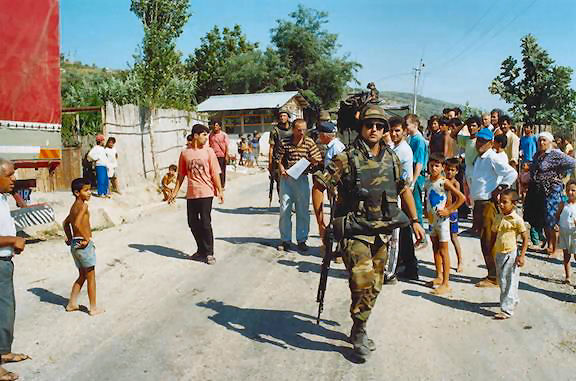
- Italian troops in an Albanian village in May 1997
Date	15 April — 8 August 1997; the last foreign troops left on 10 August
Location	Albania
Result	Italian/Albanian government victory

Belligerents
Italy (leader); Austria; Belgium; Denmark; France; Germany; Greece; Portugal; Romania; Turkey España	Criminals in Albania

Commanders and leaders
Guido Venturoni; Luciano Forlani	

Operation Alba ("Sunrise" or "Dawn" in Italian) was a multinational peacekeeping force sent to Albania in 1997. Led by Italy, it was intended to help the Albanian government restore law and order during the 1997 Albanian civil unrest.

Beginning in early 1997, the Albanian government lost control of much of their country, culminating in the desertion of many police and military units and the looting of their armories. The resulting chaos caused several countries to autonomously evacuate their nationals from Albania, which prompted concerns about the fate of others. The United Nations Security Council (UNSC) consequently adopted Resolution 1101 to establish an operation that would stabilize the situation.

The Italian 3rd Army Corps assumed responsibility for the stop-gap mission as Operation Alba, the first multinational Italian-led mission since World War II. Overall, 7,265 troops of multiple countries were deployed under the command of the operation—from Austria (60 troops), Belgium (15), Denmark (110), France (950), Greece (800 or 803), Italy (3800), Portugal (4), Romania (400), Slovenia (20), Spain (350) and Turkey (760).

Operation Alba began on 15 April, and the troops quickly restored order in Tirana. The mission's primary objectives included apprehending criminals and collecting looted weapons, but in later months, the troops also helped retrain Albanian forces to modern standards. The operation concluded on 8 August, and the last troops withdrew from the country on the 10th.

== Causes of the intervention ==
Operation Alba was launched in response to the serious social crisis that had followed the collapse of major pyramid schemes in Albania in early 1997. The loss of many Albanians' life savings invested in these schemes, in addition to dissatisfaction with political corruption and recent electoral irregularities, caused large parts of the country to rise in rebellion against the Albanian government. As governmental control and rule of law collapsed, widespread looting and violence broke out. Early operations were carried out by individual countries to evacuate their citizens, but Alba was launched in an effort to resolve more extensive issues. Italy in particular was determined to curb the migratory flow of Albanian refugees that threatened to reach alarming dimensions. Disaster struck on 28 March, when the Italian patrol vessel Sybilla collided with the refugee boat Kateri i Radës. Dozens of Albanian migrants perished, in what became known as the Tragedy of Otranto. Expecting the possibility of having to resort to force to restore order in Albania, Italy took care to acquire a mandate of the United Nations, the support of the OSCE, and the participation of a number of allies; when this was accomplished, Operation Alba was launched.

== Timeline of operation ==
The operation was approved under United Nations Security Council Resolution 1101 for an initial deployment mandate of three months. The force would be led by Italy with the consent of Albania and every involved nation. Only China abstained from voting on the resolution, and there were no votes against it.

Operational command (Comando Operativo Forze Intervento in Albania or COFIA) was centered in Rome under Italian Chief of Defence Staff Admiral Guido Venturoni with the assistance of officers from every member nation of the operation. Venturoni had three Deputy Commanders: a French, a Turkish, and a Greek officer. Additionally, there were three Deputy Chiefs of Staff: a French operations chief, a Turkish logistics chief, and a Greek communications chief. In the theatre, command began under the Navy Commander until 22 April, at which time it was transferred to COMFOR General Luciano Forlani.

The operation began on 15 April 1997 with a deployment of 450 French to Durazzo aboard the FS Orage and 200 Italian paratroopers to an airport near Tirana. 350 Spanish troops deployed later that same day, while another 270 troops of unspecified nationality deployed from an Italian transport. Phase one of the operation lasted for seven days, and was primarily concerned with securing a route between the two landing zones and a beachhead for further deployment. At the conclusion of phase one, command was transferred from the Navy to the Army.

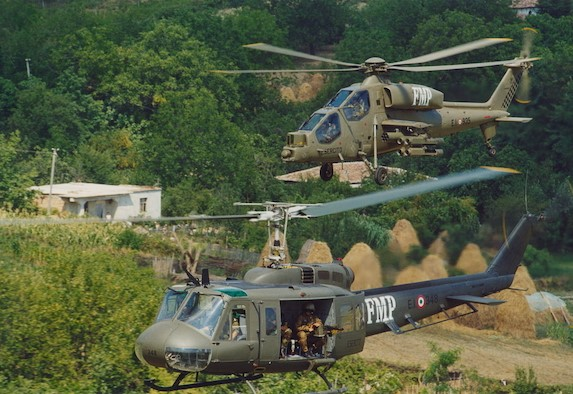
Italian helicopters during the operation in May

Phase two of the operation began on 23 April. In this period, the peacekeeping force secured several prominent towns and a staging area for humanitarian efforts. Towns of note included Lezhë, Fier, Elbasan, Argirocastro, and Sarandë. By late May, the number of troops deployed expanded to 6,556, including several thousand infantry, medical units, and a Portuguese C-130. On 19 June, as the end of the mandate approached, the UNSC passed resolution 1114 to extend the mandate another 45 days. This was largely due to concern over the electoral process of Albania.

Elections were held on 29 June, with a second round being held on 6 July. Under heavy police and observer presence, the socialist party secured a sweeping majority with 72.6% turnout.

With some sense of democratic stability restored, the peacekeeping force began its withdrawal. Over the course of phase three, all member nations began redeploying forces away from Albania. The operation officially ended on 8 August 1997, though some forces did not withdraw until 10 August.

== Composition of the peacekeeping force ==
The peacekeeping force, primarily made of Italian troops, had the following composition:

- One Italian supply regiment
- One Italian electronic warfare company
- One Italian military Intelligence platoon
- One Italian communications regiment
- Airmobile Brigade "Friuli", made of:
  - 6th General Logistic Support Regiment
  - 6th Bersaglieri Regiment (supplemented by a German infantry company)
  - One Romanian infantry battalion
  - 9th Paratroopers Assault Regiment "Col Moschin"
  - One Italian military police company
  - One Italian medical battalion
- 151st Infantry Regiment "Sassari"
- 187th Paratroopers Regiment "Folgore", supported by:
  - One Turkish infantry company
- One French infantry regiment supported by:
  - One Danish reconnaissance company
- One Turkish infantry regiment
- One Greek infantry regiment
- 18th Bersaglieri Regiment
- 1st Carabinieri Paratroopers Regiment "Tuscania", supported by:
  - One Austrian infantry company
- One Italian helicopter regiment
- One Italian sustainment regiment, made of:
  - One Italian mechanized infantry company
  - One Italian engineer company
  - One Italian communications platoon
  - One Belgian detachment

== See also ==
- Assassination of Azem Hajdari
  - 1998 Albanian coup d'état attempt
