= United Right =

United Right may refer to:

- United Right of Albania (Partia e te Drejtave te Bashkuara Shqiptare), an Albanian political party
- United Right (Israel) (Yamina), an Israeli political alliance
- United Right (Italy) (Destre Unite), an Italian political party
- United Right (Poland) (Zjednoczona Prawica), a Polish political alliance

== See also ==
- Unite the Right (disambiguation)
