= UTR =

UTR may refer to:

- Ukrainian Television and Radio
- Union of Translators of Russia
- Unique Taxpayer Reference, a number HM Revenue and Customs assigns UK taxpayers in the self assessment system
- Universal Tennis Rating, tennis player rating software
- Untranslated region of mRNA, in genetics
- UTR-Pickleball or UTR-P, pickleball player rating software
- Etulo language (ISO 639 language code utr), a language found in central Nigeria
- Unicode Technical Reports, a publication of the Unicode Consortium

== See also ==
- UTRS (disambiguation)
- Unite the Right (disambiguation)
