= Gang of Gaxhai =

Albanian criminal group

- Founded: March 1997
- Founding location: Cerkovinë, Vlorë, Albania
- Years active: 1997
- Territory: Vlorë
- Ethnicity: Albanians
- Membership: Gazmend Braka(Gaxhai); Armando Sulejmani (Çipuri); Sokol Sinomati (Buzderri); Edmond Leskaj (Mond fshatari); Gazmend Nebiu; Lodian Zykaj; Mariglen Begaj; Viktor Nuredinaj; Alfred Nebiu (Kakami)-killed; Kreshnik Abili-killed; Krenar Grabova-killed; Ilir Kokosi-killed; Elton Tato-killed; Bernard Duçka (Kuqo)-killed
- Activities: creation of the criminal group, possession of military vehicles, homicides, kidnappings, destruction of state institutions, drug trafficking, attack on the police station of Vlora and killing of police officers.
- Allies: Democratic Party of Albania
- Rivals: Gang of Çole

Gang of Gaxhai (Albanian: Banda e Gaxhait) was a criminal group created in March 1997 that operated in the city of Vlora during 1997 when anarchy reigned in the South. Its criminal activity peaked during the period March–June 1997. The gang was established by Gazmend Braka, also known as Gaxhai, with some friends from the village of Cerkovinë, the city of Vlorë and other southern cities. Their main rivals were the Gang of Çole (Albanian: Banda e Çoles). Upon completion of the rebellion and the arrest of members of two gangs, the war between them ended.
