= UTRS =

UTRS may refer to:

- Urban Train Radio System, a former GSM-R system
- Universal Torsion-Resistant Subframe, part of the RMMV HX range of tactical trucks HX3
- Utrs., as found in the Merryland genre of books described by Thomas Stretzer

== See also ==
- UTR (disambiguation) for the singular of UTRs
