= United Nations Security Council Resolution 1101 =

UN Security Council Resolution 1101
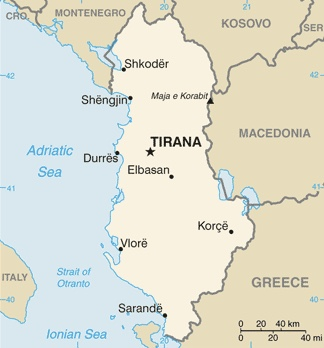
- Albania
- Date: 28 March 1997
- Meeting no.: 3,758
- Code: S/RES/1101 (Document)
- Subject: The situation in Albania
- Voting summary: 14 voted for; None voted against; 1 abstained
- Result: Adopted

Security Council composition
- Permanent members: China; France; Russia; United Kingdom; United States
- Non-permanent members: Chile; Costa Rica; Egypt; Guinea-Bissau; Japan; Kenya; South Korea; Poland; Portugal; Sweden

United Nations Security Council resolution 1101, adopted on 28 March 1997, after reiterating its concern over the situation in Albania, the council established a multinational protection force in the country to create conditions to facilitate humanitarian assistance.

The security council noted that the situation in Albania, triggered by the failure of large-scale Ponzi scheme, had deteriorated, and the Organization for Security and Co-operation in Europe (OSCE) and the European Union were attempting to find a peaceful resolution to the situation. It was convinced that the situation in Albania posed a threat to the peace and security of the region, reflecting concerns by diplomats of the unrest spilling into other ethnically Albanian areas of the Balkans.

The resolution, drafted by Italy, condemned the outbreak of violence and called for an immediate cessation of hostilities. Some countries had offered to establish a temporary and limited multinational protection force to facilitate the delivery of humanitarian assistance and create a secure environment for international humanitarian organisations. Italy, which was particularly worried about an outflow of Albanians to Italy, as had occurred in 1991, proposed to lead the force. The Council then authorised states in that operation (Operation Alba) to conduct the operation in a neutral and impartial way and, under Chapter VII of the United Nations Charter, further directed the states to ensure the freedom of movement and security of the multinational force.

It was decided that the operation would last for a period of three months, and that its cost will be borne by countries participating in it. The contributing states were requested to report to the Council every two weeks on consultations between it and the Government of Albania and to co-operate with the authorities in the country.

Resolution 1101 was adopted by 14 votes to none against, with one abstention from China, which stated that the situation was an internal affair of Albania, but, given Albania's request for assistance, did not veto the resolution.

== See also ==
- 1997 rebellion in Albania
- List of United Nations Security Council Resolutions 1101 to 1200 (1997–1998)
- Operation Libelle
- Operation Silver Wake
