= Gang of Çole =

Albanian organized crime group

- Founded: March 1997
- Founding location: Vlorë, Albania
- Years active: 1997–2001
- Territory: Vlorë
- Ethnicity: Albanians
- Membership: Myrteza Çaushi (Zani); Skerdian Bajrami; Hair Hiraj; Renato Çerçizi; Dorian Saliu; Afrim Rami (Luçiano)-killed; Pëllumb Bajrami-killed; Arben Latifi-killed; Gjikë Gërdhuqi-killed; Stefan Gërdhuqi-killed; Kastriot Gërdhuqi-killed; Leonard Idrizi-killed; Edison Mamo-killed; Taulant Shyti-killed
- Activities: creation of the criminal group, possession of military vehicles, homicides, kidnappings, giving penitence, destruction of state institutions, drug trafficking.
- Rivals: Gang of Gaxhai; Gang of Pusi i Mezinit

Gang of Çole (Albanian: Banda e Çoles or Banda e Zani Çaushit) was an Albanian criminal group that operated in the city of Vlorë during 1997–2001. The peak of their criminal activity was during March–June 1997, when anarchy reigned in the South. Gang members were charged with the creation of the criminal group, possession of military vehicles, homicides, kidnappings, giving penitence, destruction of state institutions, drug trafficking.

== Gang activity ==
The Çole gang was created in March 1997 by Myrteza Çaushi, also known as Zani, the strongman of Vlora (Albanian: Zani, i forti i Vlorës). The gang was named after the Çole neighborhood in Vlorë. The group consisted of sixteen members, most of whom had prior criminal records. Çaushi himself had been imprisoned in a high-security prison in Greece after being convicted of serious criminal offenses. However, in February 1997, he managed to escape from prison and returned to southern Albania.

Taking advantage of the ongoing unrest in the country, Çaushi established the gang known as Çole along with some friends from his neighborhood. The gang became notorious throughout the country for committing various crimes. In March 1997, the gang was formed, and they worked closely with the Vlora Rescue Committee. However, on 7 May 1997, the gang was taken hostage by dealer Artur Gjoshi and his friend Pellumb Petriti of Tepelenë, leading to a fierce clash between the gangs of Vlora and Tepelenë.

The gang's criminal activities continued throughout the year. They kidnapped a trader named Foto Kola on 8 May 1997, and released him after receiving a ransom of 500,000 Lek. On 9 May 1997, Bernard Duçka, who had gone to mediate the release of Gjoshi, was killed. In revenge, the gang's opponents kidnapped and killed two members of the gang, Niko and Avdyl Bajrami.

The gang continued their violent activities throughout the year, killing several more people, including Neritan and Edmond Dedenika on 11 May 1997, and Arben Latifi on 19 May 1997. Zani himself killed Niko Borakun after torturing him. In July 1997, the gang hijacked Sokol Kamberi.

However, the gang's reign of terror came to an end in September 1997 when Zani Çaushi and members of his gang were seized. On 23 June 1997, they had kidnapped the Mayor of Novosela, Kanan Shakaj, tortured him, and released him after he paid 200 million Lek. Zani and his friends were arrested in 1998, but he managed to escape once again and was rearrested in 1999. He was eventually sentenced to life in prison in 2001.

== Relations with Committee of Salvation and politics ==
The Gang of Çole became the main supporter of the Salvation Committee of Vlore, returning to the armed forces of the committee. Zani guaranteed the gathering Rescue Committee delegates from across the country, at their meeting on 28 March 1997. Also he was the bodyguard of Italian Prime Minister Romano Prodi during his visit to southern Albania in April 1997, after the Otranto tragedy. However the relationship between Zani and Albert Shyti, Chairman of the Committee of Salvation, were not good.

On 19 April 1997, the Italian newspaper "Corriere della Sera" stated: "Zani is nothing. A member of the Committee, he works alone. You Italians give him more importance. I'm the only one who contends against Sali Berisha. I'm the leader!" Zani was supportive of the Socialist Party and an opponent of Berisha. He was the bodyguard of Skender Gjinushi during the campaign for the June 1997 elections.

Head Police Commissariat of Vlora, "Milton Scimitar" set in the post by the Rescue Committee in March 1997, stated to the "Corriere della Sera" that: "In the South there are five bands. Zani's gang is an association that helps people get weapons. There are 12 people that do not cause problems. Zani is one of many compatriots."

== Rival gangs ==
In southern Albania during the riots of 1997, five bands were formed. Three of them were rivals of Zani: Gang of Gaxhai, Gang of Kakami and Gang of Pusi i Mezinit. The latter was eliminated in the Massacre of Levan on 28 March 1997. According to an Izet Haxhia's evidence, this band was launched to eliminate Zani and the Rescue Committee members, who were gathered in Vlora, but were detected by state police.

The greatest rival of Zani's gang was the gang of Gaxhai. The clash between them began on 9 May 1997, when Gaxhai's gang member, Bernard, known as Red, was killed. In response, Gaxhai attempted to take police armored vehicles to fight with Zani, but he didn't succeed. When the riots ended the members of two gangs were arrested.
