= Operation Silver Wake =

1997 US operation to evacuate American citizens from Albania

- Part of 1997 Albanian civil unrest
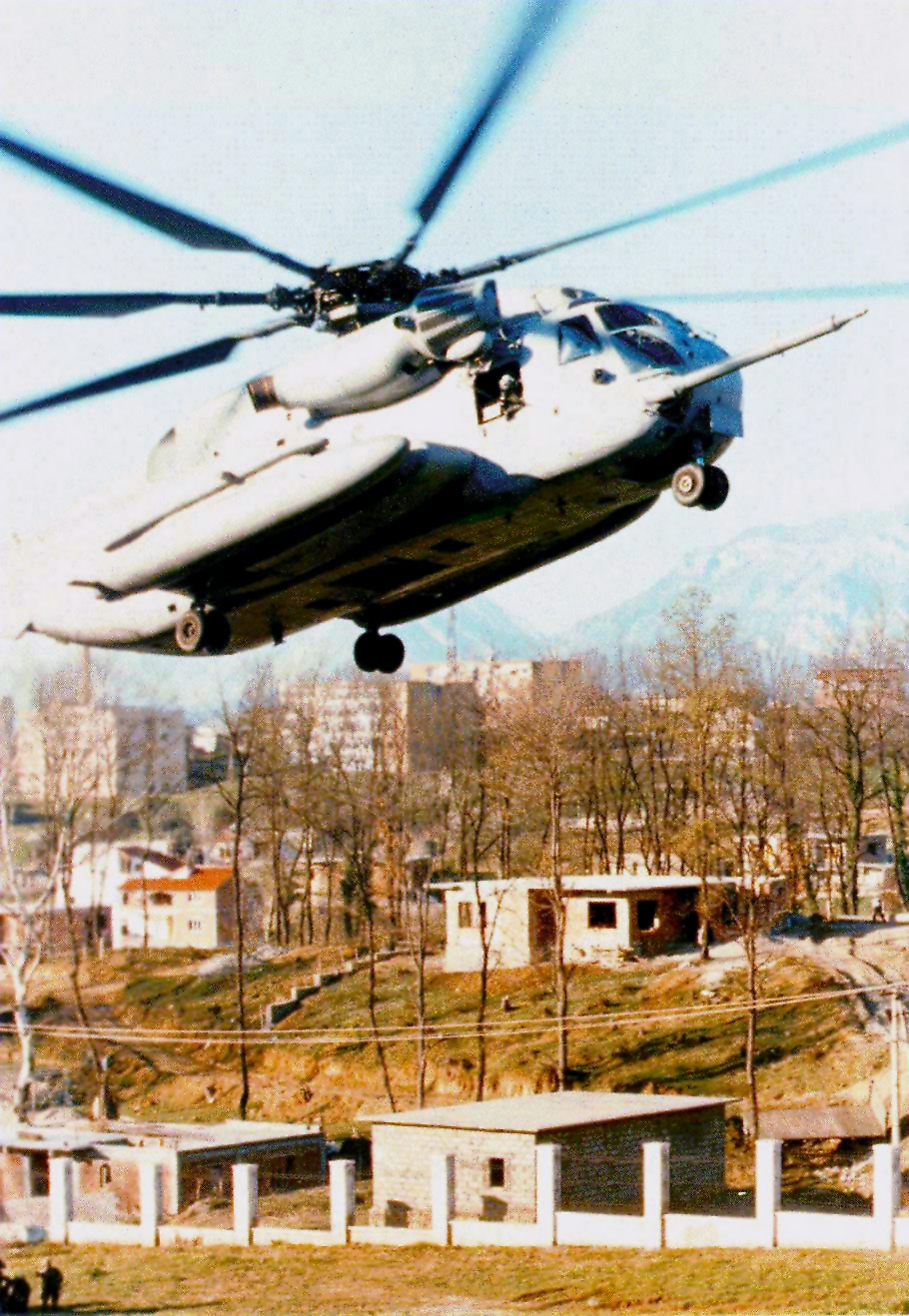
- A CH-53E Super Stallion lands at the evacuation site inside the compound at the US Embassy in Tirana
- Location: Albania
- Planned by: United States
- Executed by: United States Marine Corps; 26th Marine Expeditionary Unit

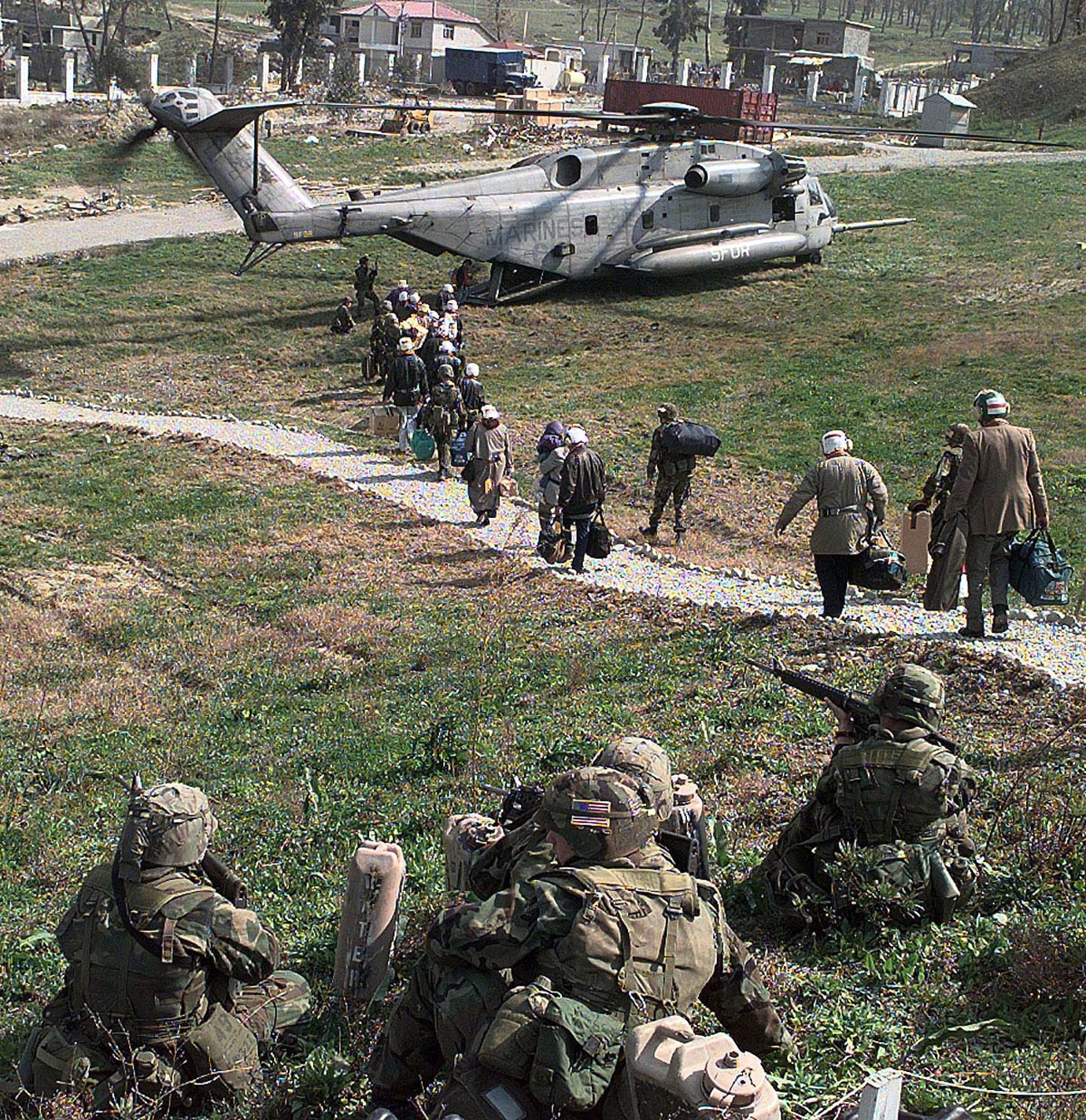
USMC CH-53 rescuing citizens

Operation Silver Wake was a non-combatant evacuation operation (NEO) led by the United States to evacuate American citizens, noncombatants and designated third country nationals from Tirana, the capital of Albania during the civil unrest in 1997. The operation took place over 13 operational days in March 1997 and was performed by U.S. Marines from the 26th Marine Expeditionary Unit conducting operations from the USS Nassau Amphibious Readiness Group. U.S. Marines from 1st Battalion, 8th Marines and MSSG-26 (The Support contingent of the 26th Marine Expeditionary Unit) secured the U.S. housing compound and held the U.S. Embassy. Approximately 900 people were evacuated by the Marines as part of the operation. Additionally, 105 Albanians were rescued March 16-17 from unsafe and overcrowded vessels.

Other U.S. Navy ships involved were USS Nashville (LPD-13) and USS Ramage (DDG-61). Other European countries such as Germany (Operation Libelle), Greece (Operation Cosmas), Italy and the UK also evacuated their citizens and civilians of other nations in similar missions in March.

Some of the awards presented to participating units included the Meritorious Unit Commendation, Joint Meritorious Unit Award and the Humanitarian Service Medal. Selected Marines were also awarded the Combat Action Ribbon.

== See also ==
- 1997 Albanian civil unrest
- Operation Libelle
