= Gang of Pusi i Mezinit =

Albanian organized crime group

- Founded: 1997
- Founding location: Vlorë, Albania
- Years active: 1997
- Territory: Vlorë
- Ethnicity: Albanians
- Membership: Ferdinand Sali Nanaj (Felja)-killed; Adriatik Shehu-killed; Abaz Xhelo Bara-killed; Roland Komira-killed; Dritan Nanaj-killed; Luan Bedaj-killed; Petrit Madallozi (Titi i Rukies)-killed; Astrit Duraj-killed; Medi Aziz Backa (Buç Backa)-killed; Astrit Selaci (Tit Selaci)-killed; Edmond Pano-killed; Sokol Muka-killed; Kastriot Muka-killed; Petrit Muka-killed
- Activities: kidnapping, robbery, extortion, murder
- Rivals: Gang of Çole

Gang of Pusi i Mezinit (Albanian: Banda e Pusit të Mezinit) was a criminal group with activities throughout southern Albania. Origin of the members of this band was from across the south of the country. Most of them had been imprisoned during the communist regime for crimes. Called by his nickname "The strongest of the South", this band had as main rival Coles gang led by Zani Çaushi. Banda was the well to Brother ardent supporter of the Democratic Party, and apparently this caused even their elimination.

== Levan Massacre ==
The Levan massacre occurred on 28 March 1997, and was the bloodiest clash of the riots of 1997. In this violent crash were killed 24 people, 18 white and 6 Roma. The clash took place between Gang of Pusi i Mezinit and the roma residents of the village of Levan in Fier. The whole Gang of Pusi i Mezinit was eliminated during the collision.

According to the police, gang members had recently escaped from prison and missed out on the opening of the military depots and were short of weapons. They went to Levan to take Kalashnikovs from roma villagers, because they believed the roma had too many. The gang members had been celebrating the release from prison at “Klubi i Ilias” in Fier and after consuming large amounts of alcohol went to a bar in Levan and over drinks demanded from the local roma leader one Kalashnikov for each of their gang members. The roma leader explained that the roma had only one Kalashnikov per person and had turned in all the extras at the police station in Fier. Arguments followed and the gang members shot and killed the roma leader and began shooting other roma customers in the bar. Local Roma villagers quickly surrounded the bar and demanded the gang's surrender. Even though they were drunk and poorly armed, the gang continued shooting from inside until they ran out of ammunition. Only three gang members who were sober enough were able to escape. All the remaining gang members were executed by the roma in fear of revenge.

Only ten days later, seven young roma were massacred near Tepelena in retaliation by friends of the gang. One month later Levan was attacked with heavy artillery by gangs from Vlora and drive by shootings from the Vlore-Fier road became frequent in Levan. Roma started organizing their own defense, however several roma have left Levan since then and moved to Tirana and Durrës.

=== Trap charges ===
Former bodyguard of Sali Berisha, and the organiser of the coup of 14 September 1998, Izet Haxhia accused Agim Shehu and the director of the Vlora Police Station during 1997, Milto Kordha (located in his office illegally Rescue Committee) that have raised the trap band of Vlora: Members of that gang were some of the strongest of those years as Tit Saleci, Felja and members of the Mukaj family in Vlora. Most of them were former prisoners and supported the Democratic Party and had thought that on 28 March 1997, there would be a gathering of the Salvation Committee, and decided to go South and kill all the participants along with Zani Çaushin, their protector. At this moment comes into play Agim Shehu and Milto Kordha. They were the ones who assaulted them, and weren't killed by the Roma.
