= Pyramid schemes in Albania =

Pyramid schemes which led to the 1997 Albanian civil unrest

The 1997 rebellion in Albania was in large part triggered by the failure of multiple pyramid schemes. These schemes, which grew to an unprecedented scale relative to the country's economy, led to many Albanians losing their money and property, culminating in widespread protests across Albania that eventually escalated into a nation-wide rebellion. At their peak, it was estimated that one in six Albanians had invested in such schemes.

== Firms bankrupted ==
The unrest in 1997 arose from the bankruptcy of around 25 firms. The face value of the schemes' liabilities totaled $1.2 billion, nearly half of Albania's GDP at the time. The schemes drew in almost two thirds of the country's population with the promise of sure financial returns, revealing the profound financial illiteracy and the lax regulatory environment in post-communist Albania.

One such scheme, Sudja, was set up by a Romany woman named Maksude Kademi. The firm collapsed on January 15, 1997, leading around 3,000 people to protest outside Kademi's apartment building. Kademi told the protesters that "the scheme has failed" and that "my company is bankrupt and you shouldn't ask the government for the money." Kademi was arrested later that day.

Vefa Holding was the main pyramid firm. It was created in 1994 by Vehbi Alimuça and spread across the country. Vefa invested in various fields of the economy such as hotels, fuel, stores and factories. Best known is the bomb attack a few weeks before the elections of May 26, 1996, on Vefa's supermarket in downtown Tirana. Vefa went bankrupt in 1998, while its president was in prison.

The Gjallica firm was created by three former State Security operatives originating from Kukes. The president of the company was Shemsie Kadria. Gjallica had its center in Vlora. The firm went bankrupt on February 5, 1997, prompting violent protests in Vlora, which later turned into rebellion against the government.

People's Democracy-Xhaferri was established in 1995 and began to extend its activities in the villages of Lushnjë, Fier and Berat. Officially, it was a "foundation", but in reality, it became one of the most severe pyramidal firms in the country. Its leader, Rrapush Xhaferri, was arrested on January 22, 1997, which triggered violent demonstrations in Lushnjë on January 24–25.

Populli, in English meaning people, was created on July 16, 1996, and was extended in the same area as the Xhaferri. Its President was Bashkim Driza, a former State Security agent. He worked closely with the Albanian opposition parties and financed their campaigns and newsletters. During the riots of 1997, he left with a U.S. helicopter. In September 2008, on a notice from Albania, the Uruguayan police arrested Bashkim Driza at his apartment in Montevideo. It was discovered that during the last 11 years, he had moved freely between Uruguay, Chile, the Dominican Republic and other Latin American countries. Just as Driza was about to be extradited to Albania in February 2009, he escaped from his apartment.

The nine major pyramid firms in relation to creditors were:

Company	Number of creditors
VEFA	59,005
Cenaj	19,078
Kamberi	13,241
Sude	12,991
Beno	10,793
Gjallica	8,632
Silva	4,490
M.Leka	2,464
Global	1,793
Total	132,487
