= Dëllënjë =

- Village
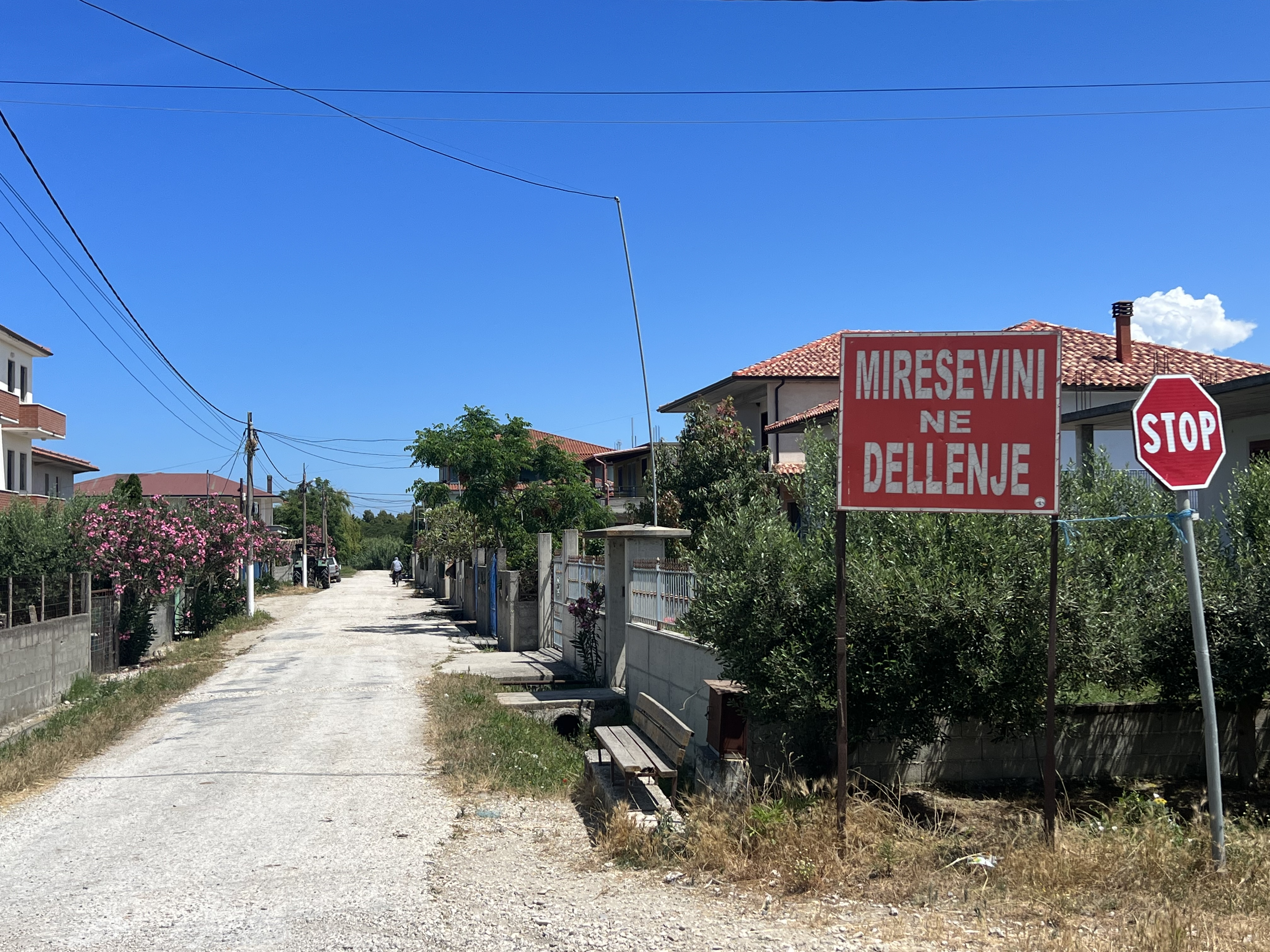

- Location within Albania
- Coordinates: 40°39′4.94″N 19°22′36.71″E
- Country: Albania
- County: Vlorë
- Municipality: Vlorë
- Administrative unit: Novoselë
- Time zone: UTC+1 (CET)
  - Summer (DST): UTC+2 (CEST)
- Area Code: 033

Dëllënjë is a village in Albania, part of the former Novoselë municipality, in the Vlorë County. At the 2015 local government reform it became part of the municipality Vlorë. It is located 31km away from Vlorë city (north direction) and 4km away from the Adriatic seashore. It is the last village along the Vjosë river.

== Name ==
The name Dëllënjë has Albanian origins and derived from Dëllinjë ("juniper"). Naming after the local flora is a common phenomenon amongst the Myzeqar Albanians. Before the village was founded the area was known as "The Juniper Forest".

== Culture ==
The population of Dëllënjë is exclusively Orthodox Albanian. In Dëllënjë, like some of the villages in the Novoselë area, the marriages between people of the same village were allowed, mainly because it was a newly centralised village founded by the local Albanians part of the Lalë clans who were scattered along the Vjosë river with no family ties between them.

The village is also known as the village of Fishermen and Hunters.

== Flora and Fauna ==
Dëllënjë has the typical Mediterranean Climate and being close to the Adriatic shoreline the geography mainly consist of saltwater marshes. Two of the local plants of the area are the "Shëllire" (Albanian for "Brine") and "Fshesë Kripe" (Albanian for "Salty Broom").

The nearby lagoon of Kallënga is a common fishing area for eels and other types of fish. The most common birds found in the area are the Great white heron (Ardea alba), Eurasian coot (Fulica atra) and the ducks (Anatidae).
