= Karaburun tragedy =

2004 tragedy at sea off the coast of Italy

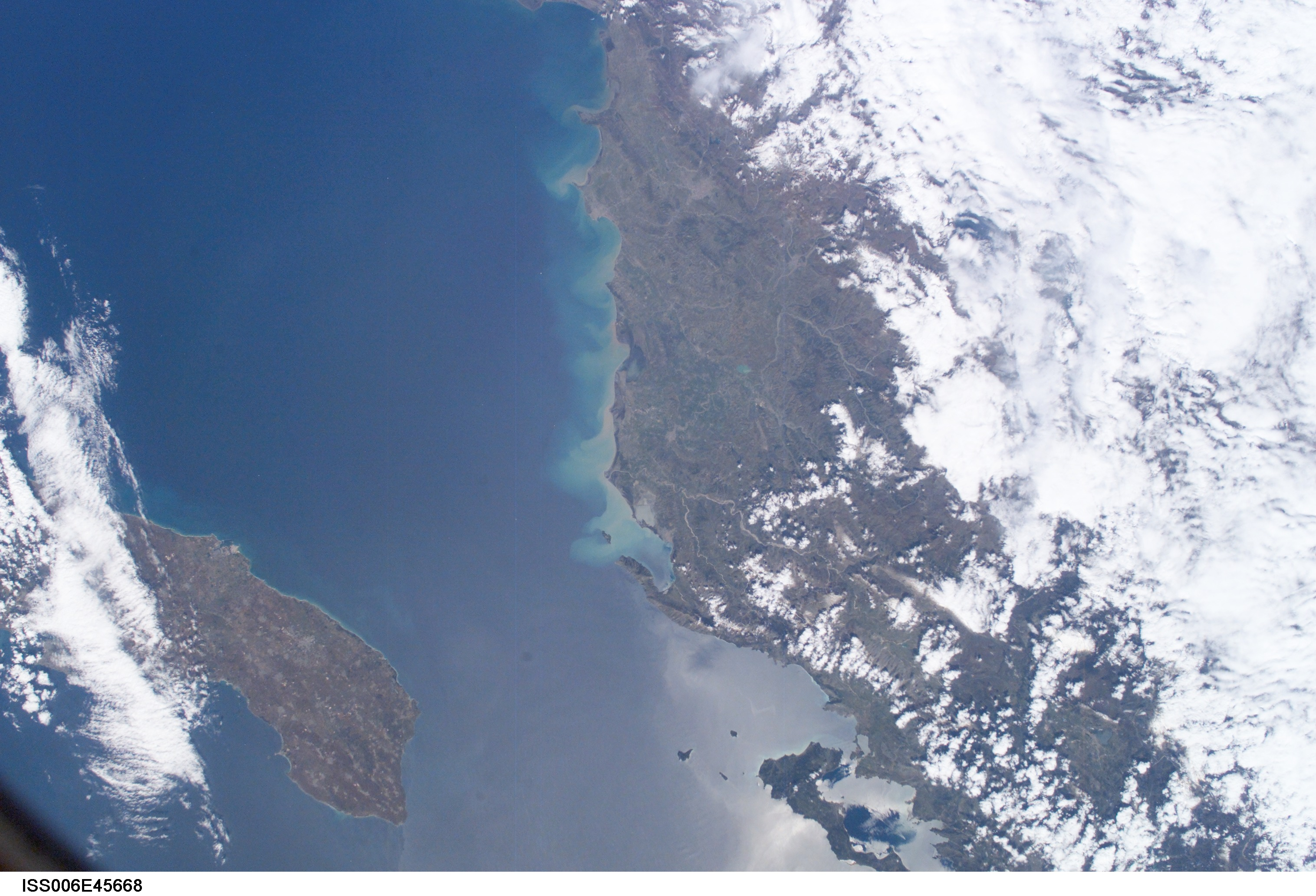
The Strait of Otranto.

The Karaburun tragedy of 2004, also known as the 9 January tragedy, was a marine incident that occurred during an attempted sea crossing from southern Albania to Italy by 36 people, including two dinghy operators and the smugglers' leader. They were trying to cross the Strait of Otranto, off the southern coast of Italy, in an inflatable boat, heading towards Brindisi, on the Adriatic coast of Apulia. Twenty-eight people died or were declared lost at sea, and there were only eight survivors. For Albanian emigrants, the tragedy had the second highest mortality rate for such events, after the Otranto tragedy of March 1997, when the Albanian ship Kateri i Radës, smuggling clandestine emigrants, was hit by the Italian warship Sibilla, resulting in the death of 84 people.

Unemployment, low income, and difficult living conditions persuaded people to leave Albania, especially in the 1990s. Demanding visa requirements produced great difficulties in obtaining travel visas through foreign embassies, followed by a process involving lengthy, complex, and costly procedures, claimed by some to be humiliating, were the main reasons suggested for the illegal emigration. Albania signed its first Readmission Agreement with Italy on 18 November 1997. In August 2002, after making a show of burning some inflatable boats used for people smuggling in the mole of Radhima, the Albanian Prime minister Fatos Nano declared that "… we are burning the past and piracy from our coasts. There's no more rubber dinghies and traffickers on the waters of the Republic of Albania." Despite the political reforms and successes of the Albanian government in its efforts to stop illegal emigration, in early 2004 this phenomenon still existed, as evidenced by the Karaburun deaths on 9 January. It was not until some six and a half years later, on 8 November 2010, that the Council of the European Union approved visa-free travel into the Schengen Area for Albanian citizens.

== Description ==
There were 36 people from North Albania who traveled from Shkodër to Vlorë carried in a closed van to Dhërmi. Each of them had paid 1500 euros to the traffickers in order to pass illegally to Italy's southern coasts. They embarked with two dinghy drivers and one trafficker, setting out at around 17:30 from the northern coasts of Dhërmi village on the stormy afternoon of 9 January, after it became completely dark. Half an hour after their departure both of the boat's motors stopped, possibly because of the over-load of passengers, as well as the difficult sea conditions. Returning was impossible. They were trapped by the sea that had a force of 6 on the Beaufort scale, despite being just 3 miles from Karaburun Peninsula's western shores. One of the motors started leaking fuel, burning some passengers. The people on board tried desperately to call their relatives and the police for help, and at 21:30 one of the dinghy drivers called Top-Channel TV. The boat filled with water but did not sink. Some passengers could not endure the cold and the burns and eventually died.

According to the Dhërmi police post's chief, V. Kordhishta, at 17:40 his superiors were notified about the watercraft seen on radar, moving away at a mere 200 m from the shore. Afterwards, with other policemen, he went to the place where the embarkation occurred on the northern shores of Dhërmi and found an abandoned Peugeot car and some empty plastic cans of fuel. At 18:30, the radar in Vlorë tracked two watercraft, 3 miles off Karaburun's coast, publicly confirmed by a spokesman of the Ministry of Order during a transmission on Top-Channel. At 18:40 a patrol boat of the Delta Force unit, an inflatable dinghy of the Border Patrol and another patrol boat set off toward Dhermi. Due to the bad weather they could not progress beyond Mezokanal between Sazan Island and Karaburun Peninsula and docked in Shën Jan bay, near Cape of Gjuhëz. At 19:00 the boat's approximate coordinates were determined, and at 21:40 the Italian representatives of NATO in Durrës were notified. They additionally sent several watercraft and two helicopters. At 1 a.m. the search was stopped, to be resumed in the morning.

A NATO helicopter, AB 212 model, reached the location of the inflatable boat at 8:30 on Saturday, 10 January. The pilot hovered over the target for nearly half an hour until a '’CP-407'’ patrol boat of the 28th Group of the Italian navy (Marina Militare) stationed in Durrës seaport, could arrive to save the 11 survivors. They found 21 dead bodies: 18 males and 3 females, with 7 others missing. The 21 dead bodies were transported and arrived at 1 p.m. at Albanian-Italian naval base of Sazan. At 14:20, the 11 survivors from the Guardia di Finanza's ship arrived at the Vlora seaport. The survivors were sent to the hospital for medical care and one was airlifted by helicopter to Tirana for further medical assistance. At 18:00, the 21 bodies in plastic bags arrived from Sazan Island at the morgue of Vlorë, where police authorities barred journalists from entering.

=== Contradictions ===
Several contradictions surround the entire event. The survivors on board stated that two people had died from injuries and burns from the probable blast of one of the motors. Meanwhile, one of them was seriously burned and sent by helicopter to Tirana for specialized treatment. Captain Santarelli, chief of the Guardia di Finanza clearly stated that there were no signs of fire on the boat. It was speculated the motor had suffered an unexpected small blast without spreading fire, instead just leading to fuel leakage.

Giuseppe da Salvo, the pilot of the helicopter who was the first to notice the inflatable boat with survivors and the 21 deceased victims on board, expressed his surprise when learning that three fire extinguishers in good condition were found on the boat. He departed from Durrës at 21:00 when the wind's speed reached 80 kilometres per hour (50 mph), while flying a helicopter would normally be prohibited. After flying for two hours over the presumed location of the vessel on the Ionian Sea, he turned back without finding the target. The next morning the boat was located. Meanwhile, the survivors deny the existence of any fire extinguishers on board.

=== Second boat ===
The existence of two watercraft was publicly reported late at night by a Ministry of Public Order representative through a national TV channel, referring to what the radar in Vlore had detected. Nevertheless, after the 11 survivors were found, it was officially reported there was only one inflatable boat with a total number of 39 passengers. The Democratic opposition deputies claimed the concealment of another boat by the government officials. Nikollë Mhillaj, the founder and chair of the Association 9 Janar asked for efforts being made to pursue the issue at the highest level of justice and the clarification of the existence of the second boat. Director of Criminal Police of the General Directorate of State Police, Mr. Sokol Bizhga, attested in his testimony for the Prosecution of Vlorë that another inflatable boat was found a few hours before Guardia di Finanza's watercraft rescued the 11 survivors: "At the dawn of 10 January, around 06:30 we noticed at a distance about four miles from Gjiri i Dafinës (Laurel bay ) a rubber dinghy. We distinguished that there were people on it, but didn't notice whether they were moving. I contacted the operating room of Vlora and after thirty minutes a watercraft, probably of the Interforce unit came to place. Ten minutes later a helicopter arrived. When they reached the dinghy, I was confirmed that there were dead people, but I couldn't go there because there was no place on the vessel for me..."

== Investigations and aftermath ==
The two dinghy drivers were initially sent to the hospital but then taken into custody. One of them, A. Rrokaj, was the son of the Chief of the Antiterrorist Police Department in Shkodër and nephew of Vlorë Seaport' s vice director. The second driver's brother was the owner of the boat. Another relative, Chief of the Circulation Police Department of Vlorë was also involved and all were sentenced or imprisoned. The opposition leader deputies of the Democratic party accused the government of strong implication in the tragedy and in involvement in clandestine trafficking. They asked for the resignation of the Minister of Public Order, Mr. Igli Toska, as well as the PM Fatos Nano. An atmosphere of discontent arose among the populace towards the government and some peaceful protests were held. On 3 March 2006, despite provoking a broad public debate, the moratorium on motor speedboats took effect; a three-year term law, banning all Albanian motor vehicle movement in the territorial waters of Albania. Five years after the tragedy, on 25 February 2009, some of the relatives of the victims staged a hunger strike. On 17 March 2009 the Court of Appeal in Vlorë decided to reopen investigations into the tragedy of Karaburun and in December 2009, one of the main organizers of the trafficking was arrested in Borgo San Lorenzo, Italy, under a fake name. He had previously been sentenced to 25 years of imprisonment by the Court of Appeal in Vlorë. In February 2010, Albanian President Bamir Topi decreed the law on the "Moratorium of motor sailing boats of the Republic of Albania". The Democratic majority approved the law by only 72 votes (out of 140), with the explicit disapproval of the opposition. According to the law, the effect of the moratorium on seas, lakes and rivers of the country was extended for 3 more years.

== Cultural references ==
In February 2004, the well-known Albanian folk singer Bujar Qamili sang Zëra në fund të detit ( Voices in the bottom of the sea), a song dedicated to the memory of the victims of the Karaburun tragedy. The lyrics were written by Qazim Çela and Jorgo Papingji and the music was composed by the Aliu brothers and orchestrated by Luan Degestani. At the third occasion of the Tirana International Short Film Festival (TIFF), held from 6 to 10 December 2006 in Tirana, Albania, the young movie director Gledis Bica competed with the documentary film entitled Ëndrra të Mbytura ( Drowned dreams). The short movie tells about what happened during the tragedy of 9 January and the title itself refers to the unfortunate victims who were dreaming of a better life.

== See also ==
- Tragedy of Otranto
- Strait of Otranto
- Albanian diaspora
- Karaburun Peninsula, Albania
