= Novoselë =

- Administrative unit
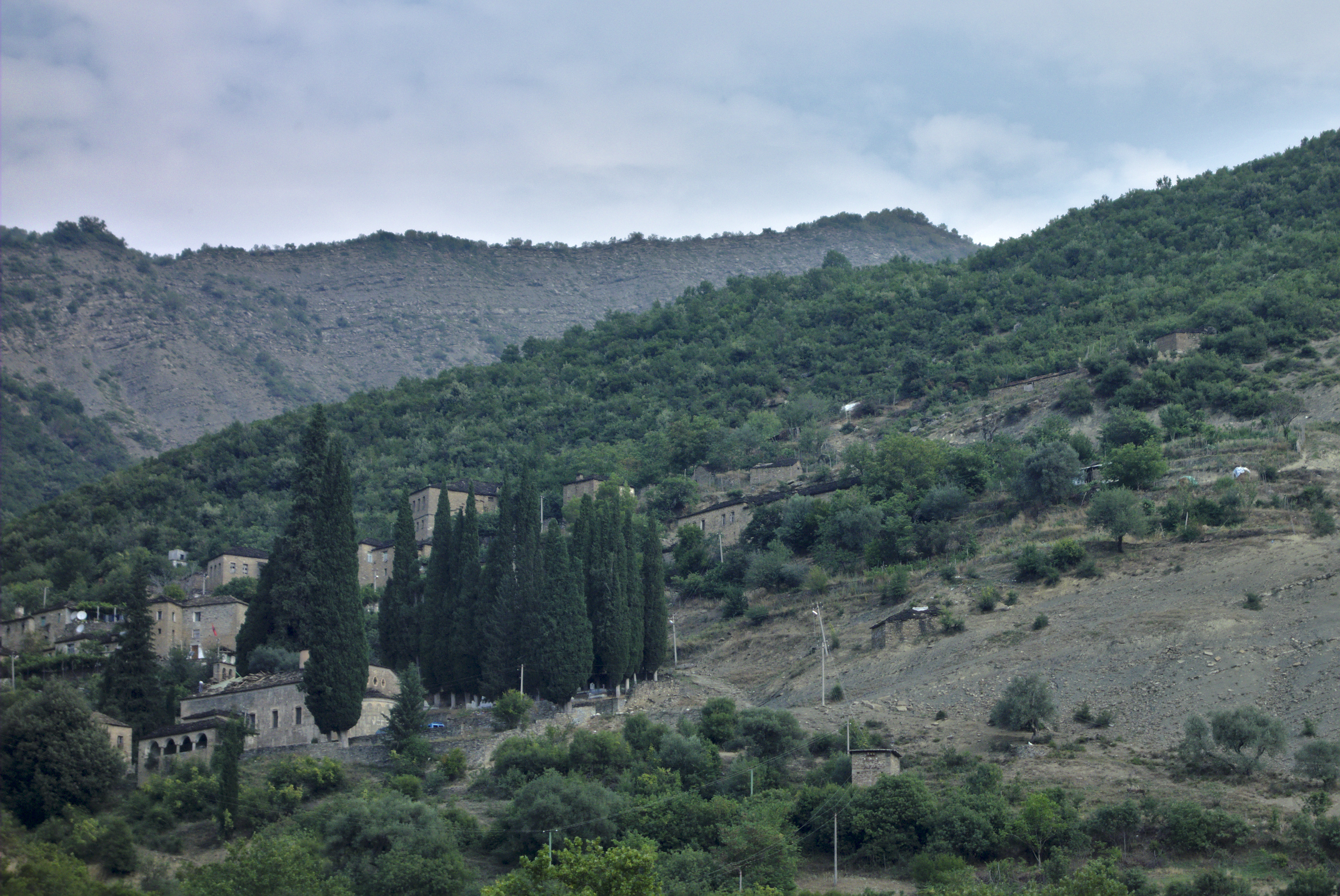
- The village of Novoselë with St. Mary's Church in the background

- Location within Albania
- Coordinates: 40°37′N 19°28′E
- Country: Albania
- County: Vlorë
- Municipality: Vlorë

Population (2011)
  - Administrative unit: 8,209
- Time zone: UTC+1 (CET)
  - Summer (DST): UTC+2 (CEST)
- Postal Code: 9411

Novoselë (Albanian definite form: Novosela) is a village and a former municipality in the Vlorë County, southwestern Albania. At the 2015 local government reform it became a subdivision of the municipality Vlorë. The population at the 2011 census was 8,209. The village formerly had a railway station, which closed in 1997.

== Villages ==
The municipal unit consists of the villages Novoselë, Akërni, Aliban, Bishan, Cerkovinë, Delisuf, Dëllënjë, Fitore, Mifol, Poro, Skrofotinë and Trevllazër. The region is populated by ethnic Albanians mainly orthodox Christian’s of the Myzeqar subgroup.
