= Tragedy of Otranto =

1997 naval disaster off the coast of Albania

Coordinates: 40°13′10″N 18°48′32″E

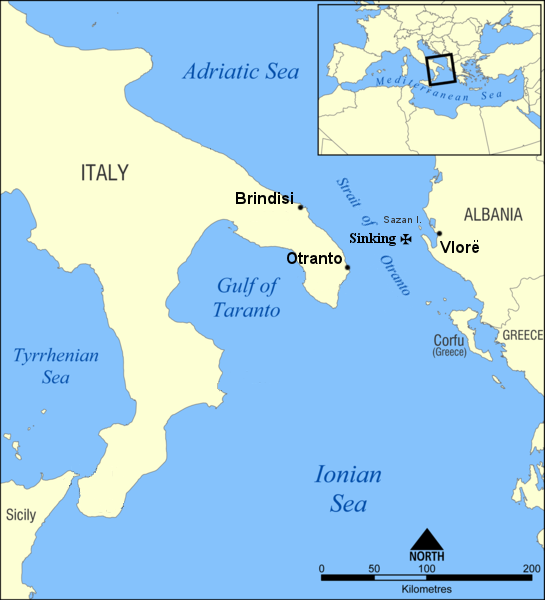
- Location of the sinking in the Strait of Otranto
- Event: Sinking of Albanian motorboat Kateri i Rades
- Cause: Collision with the Italian corvette Sibilla (F 558)
- Place: Strait of Otranto, 35 miles (56 km) from the Italian coast
- Deaths: 83 people
- Time: 28 March 1997; 4:30 PM (UTC-3:30 PM)
- On board: 142 people

The Tragedy of Otranto took place on 28 March 1997 when the Albanian ship Kateri i Radës sank in a collision with the Italian corvette Sibilla (F 558) in the Strait of Otranto and at least 84 Albanians, aged 3 months to 69 years, lost their lives. The emigrants had been part of a large migration of Albanians to Italy during the 1997 Albanian civil unrest, that began after the collapse of several large-scale pyramid schemes. To prevent the unauthorized entry of migrants into Italy, the Italian Navy set up a procedure to board Albanian vessels whenever encountered, implementing a de facto blockade.

In proceeding to carry out a boarding, the Italian vessel Sibilla collided with Kateri i Radës and capsized it, resulting in the Albanian deaths. The captains of both ships were held responsible for "shipwreck and multiple manslaughter". The event raised questions over the extent of power a state may exercise to protect itself from unauthorized entry. Arguments were presented that a state must limit coercive actions disproportionate to the risk of unauthorized entry. The United Nations High Commissioner for Refugees criticized the Italian blockade as illegal since it had been established solely through an intergovernmental agreement with Albania.

== Background ==
After years of enforced isolation and a ban on international travel, with shoot-to-kill orders on the border, thousands of Albanians began migrating to Italy and Greece in late 1990, when communism in Albania started to fall. Two large waves of people came to Italy, first in March and then in August 1991. The first wave was sparked by a rumor that Italy was giving visas, and thousands of people commandeered boats of all sizes at the port of Durrës. By then, about 20,000 Albanians had reached Italy, most of them in Brindisi. Much of the Italian media portrayed the situation as "barbarians" invading Italian soil. Italian opinion-makers voiced concerns regarding the alleged "Islamic danger" of the migration. Others saw a connection between the Ottoman invasion of Otranto (1480–1481) across the 40 miles (64 km) wide Strait of Otranto and contemporary migration.

In 1997, a crisis erupted in Albania after the collapse of several massive pyramid schemes, which resulted in social deterioration and violence in the country. An imposition of a curfew and a state of emergency on 2 March provoked a popular rebellion, causing concern in Italy, which feared another large-scale migration flow. Albanian migration to Italy peaked in the latter half of March, bringing tremendous pressure to Italian accommodation centers and provoking a strong reaction in Italian public opinion. Italy had been operating under a bilateral agreement with Albania to board Albanian vessels whenever encountered starting on 3 April 1997 and Albanian would-be migrants going to Italy would be sent back to Albania, in exchange for Italian financial, police, and humanitarian assistance to the country. A military Operation White Flags was established in the international waters of the Strait and implemented a de facto naval blockade.

== Sinking ==
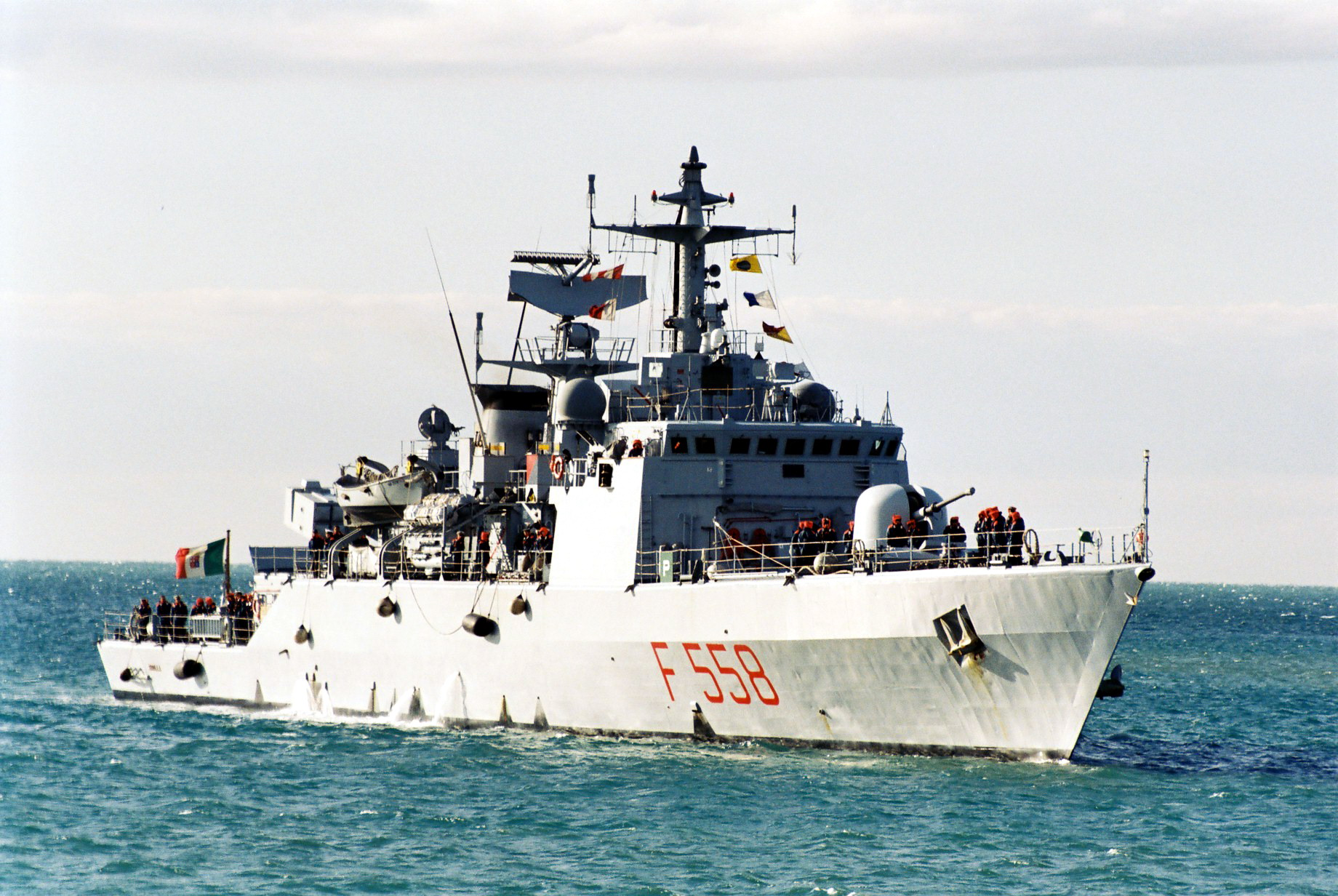
The Italian Navy corvette Sibilia

The incident happened on 28 March 1997 in the Strait of Otranto when the Minerva-class corvette Sibilia of the Italian Navy collided with the Albanian ship Kateri i Radës, which had left from the Albanian port city of Vlorë with 142 people on board. The Sibilla sought to stop and inspect the ship suspected of containing irregular migrants. The vessel instead ended up colliding with the ship and sinking it. According to Italian authorities, there was no intention to cause the collision. The Zefiro first approached and identified the Kateri i Radës as a motorboat with approximately 30 civilians on board. The motorboat continued toward Italy even though a stop order was issued by the Zefiro. This happened around 4:30 PM, near the Albanian island Sazan. Sibilia then took over the operation and during its maneuvers, the Italian ship caused the Kateri i Radës to turn which resulted in subsequent deaths. After the Albanian ship was capsized, the Sibilia allegedly left and came back approximately 20 minutes later. The bodies of at least 52 who died were recovered. The total number of dead may be as high as 83. The survivors were taken to the Apulian port of Brindisi, where they arrived at 2:45 AM. They were then put on a bus and taken to an immigration center to be identified. On 29 and 30 March 1997, news of the disaster made it to the first page of major Italian newspapers, relating the sense of the gravity of the incident, which reported it as either a collision or a ramming. 31 March was a day of mourning in Albania.

On 28 March, the United Nations Security Council adopted resolution 1101, which established a multinational protection force in Albania to facilitate the delivery of humanitarian assistance. The force, known as Operation Alba, was led by the Italians and included 6,500 soldiers from eight other countries. The unspoken reason for the intervention was to stem the flow of refugees.

== Legal proceedings ==
The accident raised questions about the extent of power that the state may use to protect itself from unauthorized entry. Although undisputed that the sinking was unintentional, controversy exists over whether it resulted from dangerous maneuvering, which was disproportionate in relation to the ship's stopping. Authors argue that the state must limit coercive actions disproportionate to the risk of intrusion. The United Nations High Commissioner for Refugees criticized the Italian blockade as "illegal" since Italy established it only through a bilateral, intergovernmental agreement with Albania.

The Xhavara et al. v. Italy and Albania case was held inadmissible because of non-exhaustible national remedies. The European Court of Human Rights, which held the case, assumed jurisdiction relying on the bilateral agreement between Albania and Italy. The ship was recovered 35 miles (56 km) from the Italian coast, no more than 10 miles (16 km) to 15 miles (24 km) from the Albanian coast within Albanian territorial waters. The court held Italy responsible for the incident since it was considered to have exercised jurisdiction. Italy was also held responsible for investigating the deaths, a requirement deemed fulfilled by the public manslaughter proceedings held against the captain of the Italian vessel. By the end of eight years of proceedings, the Court of Brindisi convicted the Italian and Albanian captains together of "shipwreck and multiple manslaughter" with the first to three years in prison and the second to four. Responsibility for the "accident" was attributed to both and was relegated to the individual level. The larger chain of command, legal framework, discourses, and established practices which resulted in the sinking have not been judicially investigated.

== Remembrance ==
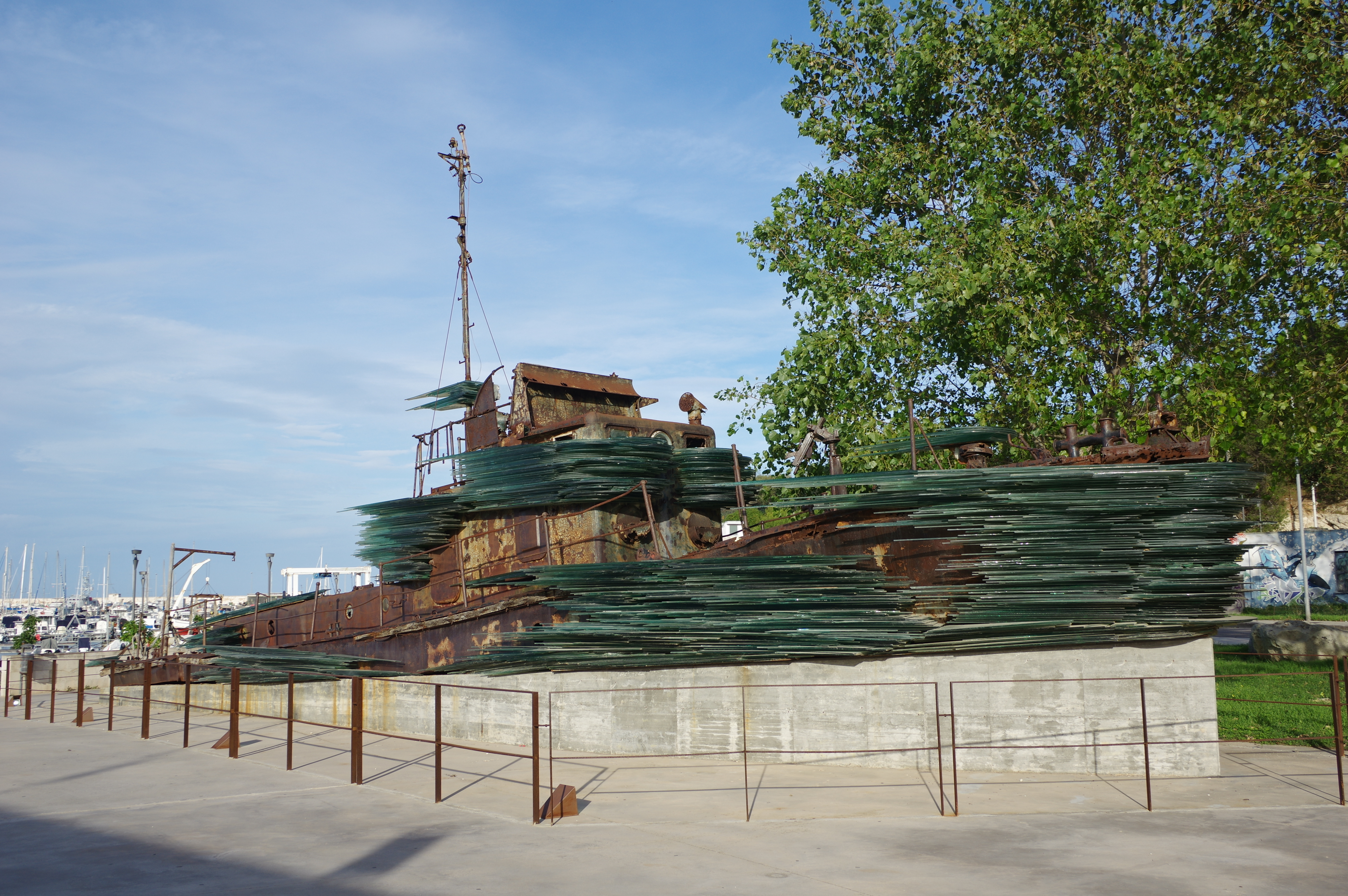
Memorial at port of Otranto by Greek sculptor Costas Varotsos

The tragedy became part of the Albanian folk song repertoire relating to the migration of Albanians abroad. The leading figures of this practice were local intellectuals called rapsods related the mythistory of kurbet before World War II with the migration. They use metaphors and performance devices taken from oral folk poetry and death laments, which react to the migrations to fix them in the community's memory. This became a tool for responding to the loss of life for the tragedy of Otranto and other tragic events.

Parts of Kateri i Radës were transported to a concrete platform in the port of Otranto as a monument to the tragedy. The project cost €150 thousand and was entrusted to the Greek sculptor Costas Varotsos. Before the project, what was left of the ship lay in a corner of the port of Brindisi. The project was titled L'Approdo. Opera all'Umanità Migrante (The Landing. A work dedicated to Migrating Humanity). Photographers Arta Ngucaj and Arben Beqiraj published photographs of the ship on the Albanian-Italian newspaper Shqiptari i Italisë. The families of the dead requested for the relics of Kateri i Radës to be placed in Albania after Italian media reported that it was to be used as a monument.

== See also ==
- 1997 Albanian civil unrest
- Operation Alba
- Albanian diaspora
- Karaburun tragedy
