= Forum for Democracy (Albania) =

Albanian organisation created in January 1997

Forum for Democracy (Albanian: Forumi për Demokraci) was an Albanian organisation created in January 1997 near the start of the 1997 Albanian civil unrest, in support of anti-government protesters and in opposition to President Sali Berisha. At the organisation's head was Daut Gumeni, as recommended by Fatos Lubonja from the Albanian Helsinki Committee and Kurt Kola from the Association of the Formerly Politically Persecuted. The Forum was mainly formed by three opposition parties: the Socialist Party of Albania, the Social Democratic Party of Albania, and the Democratic Alliance Party. The main demands of the Forum were the government's resignation, early elections and full government compensation of the money many Albanians had lost in pyramid schemes. With the start of armed rebellion in early March, the role of the Forum decreased and Salvation Committees were subsequently formed.
