= Robbery of the Northern State Treasury =

Approximately US$6 million was stolen from the Albanian treasury in Shkodër in 1997 (equivalent to about US$12 million in 2025).
