= Unite the Right =

Unite the Right may refer to:

- Unite the Right (Canada), a 1996–2003 Canadian political movement that led to the creation of the Conservative Party
- Unite the Right rally, a 2017 white supremacist rally in Charlottesville, Virginia
- Unite the Right 2, a 2018 white supremacist rally in Washington, DC

== See also ==
- United Right (disambiguation)
