= Battle of the Strait of Otranto =

Battle of the Strait of Otranto can refer to:

- Battle of the Strait of Otranto (1917), a 1917 naval battle during World War I
- Action in the Strait of Otranto, a 1940 naval battle during World War II
