= Desertion of 4 March 1997 =

The desertion of 4 March 1997 (Albanian: Dezertimi i 4 Marsit 1997) was the desertion of two Albanian Air Force pilots, Agron Dajçi and Ardian Elezi, to Italy. The incident caused a diplomatic scandal and increased stress between the rebels and the government.

== The event ==
On 4 March 1997, at 15:30, two pilots of the 4020 Regiment left Rinas airport and headed towards the south of the country. During their flight they detoured towards Italy and landed at the Galatina Air Base in Lecce. They managed to avoid radar detection by flying their plane 15 meters above sea level and were only detected by Italian forces after landing. The Albanian government later demanded the repatriation of the two deserters. The pilots said they were ordered by the government to strike Mifol Bridge, connecting Fier with Vlorë, in order to isolate the insurgency. Not wanting to hit civilians, they fled to Italy and subsequently asked for political asylum. The Albanian government denied that the pilots had been ordered to fire on civilians and asserted that they were simply sent on a reconnaissance mission; this assertion was reinforced by the fact that no armament was found on the plane in Italy after it landed. It turned out to be leftist political propaganda.
