= Cerkovinë =

- Village
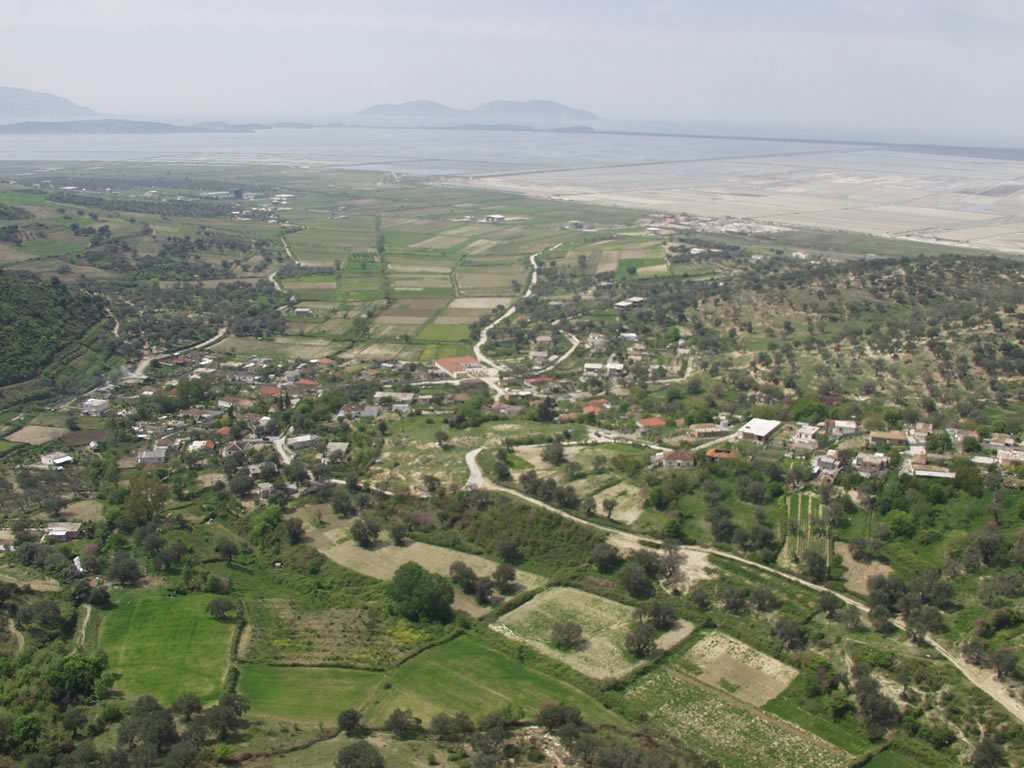
- View of Cerkovinë from the air

- Location within Albania
- Coordinates: 40°33′57″N 19°29′3″E
- Country: Albania
- County: Vlorë
- Municipality: Vlorë
- Administrative unit: Novoselë
- Time zone: UTC+1 (CET)
  - Summer (DST): UTC+2 (CEST)
- Area Code: 033

Cerkovinë is a village in Albania, part of the former Novoselë municipality, in the Vlorë County. At the 2015 local government reform it became part of the municipality Vlorë. It is located 12 km away from Vlorë city (north direction) and 8 km away from the Adriatic seashore.

The toponym of Cerkovinë is of Slavic origin, derived from crkva ("church", Bulgarian tsъrkva, tserkva) and -ovina (a locative suffix) to mean "place of churches". Cerkovinë's territory is mainly composed of hills full of hundreds of years old olive trees and vineyards. The major products of Cerkovinë are grapes and olives. The hills in front of the sea and a typical Mediterranean climate make Cerkovinë a perfect place for vineyards and olives. In Cerkovinë there is the only salt factory in Albania which has occupied a huge field from the Cerkovinë's territory between the village and the seashore.

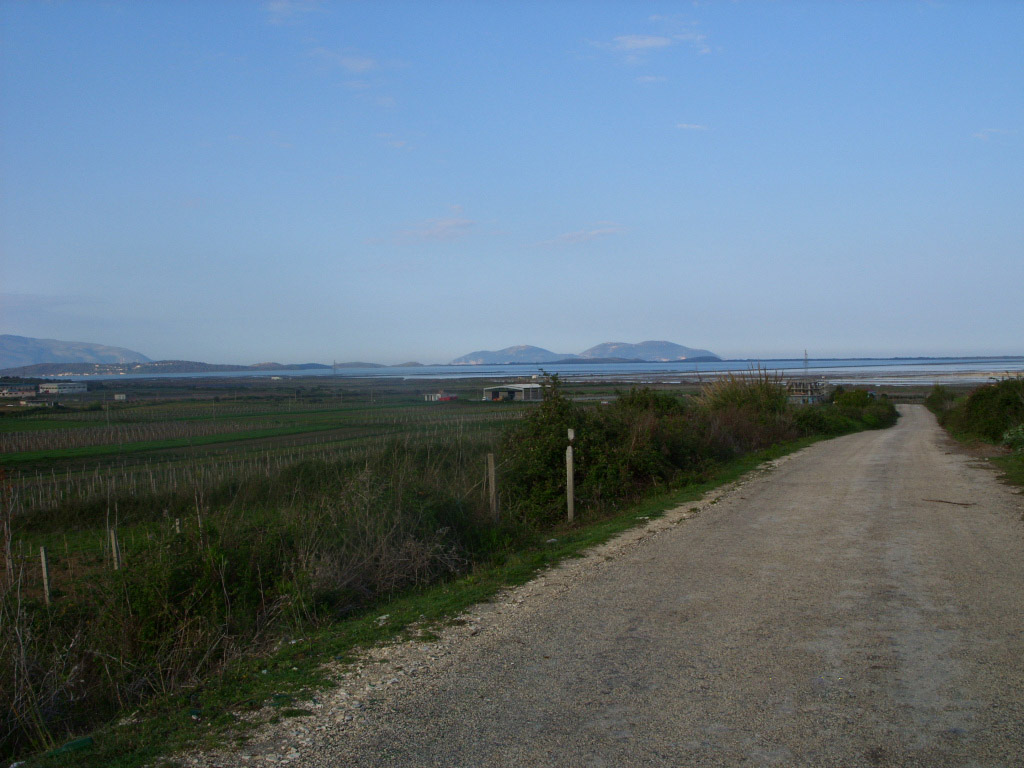
Cerkovina Road (leaving direction)

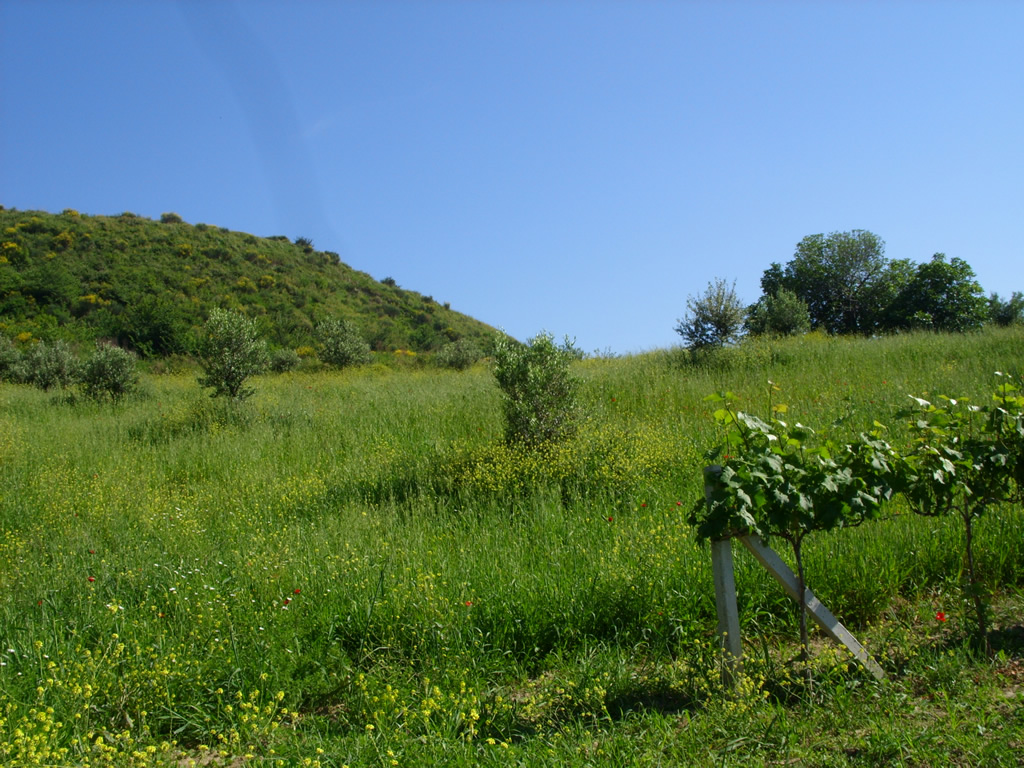
"Qafa e lepurit" Hill

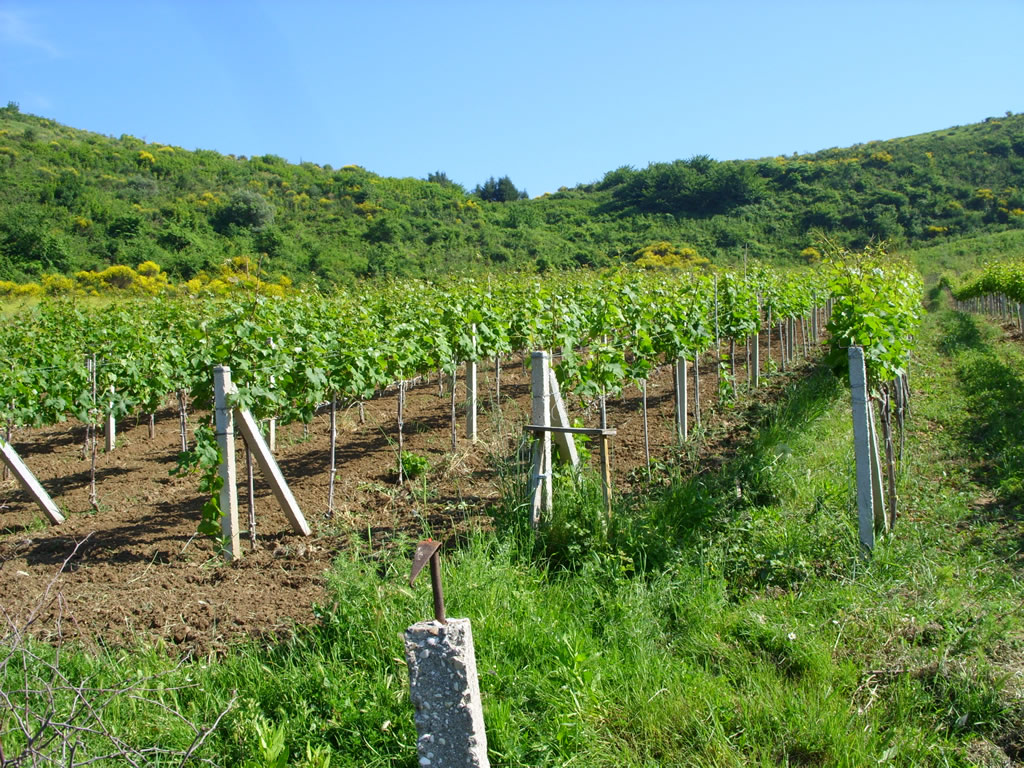
"Qafa e lepurit" Hill
