= Operation Libelle =

German military operation in Tirana, Albania

Operation Dragonfly
- Part of the 1997 Albanian civil unrest
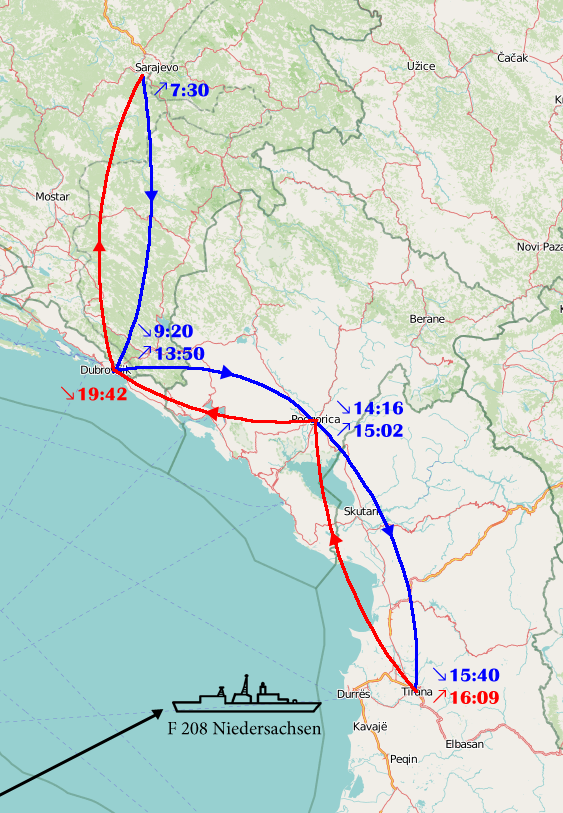
- Map showing the route of the German helicopters
Date	March 14, 1997
Location	Tirana, Albania
Result	German victory

Belligerents
Germany	Albanian Insurgents

Commanders and leaders
(Germany) Oberst Henning Glawatz	Unknown

Strength
89 Soldiers 5 CH-53G heavy transport helicopters	Unknown

Casualties and losses
No casualties 1 helicopter damaged	1 Insurgent Wounded

Operation Libelle ("Dragonfly" in German) was an evacuation operation of the German Armed Forces that took place on March 14, 1997 in the Albanian capital of Tirana during the Albanian unrest of 1997. In the same week, American, British, and Italian military forces evacuated their citizens from Albania. Operation Libelle was the first time since World War II that German infantry fired shots in combat.

== Situation in Albania ==
In March 1997 several Western states evacuated their citizens. Operation Libelle was launched after a fraudulent pyramid scheme collapsed and a significant number of Albanian citizens lost their life savings. As a consequence, an armed rebellion took hold in large parts of Albania, and the Albanian government lost control.

The crisis eventually culminated in the 1997 Albanian civil unrest. After the Military of Albania and police armories were looted by insurgents, criminals, and civilians, large parts of the country descended into chaos and violence.

== Legal basis ==
The Federal Republic of Germany relied on the recognized doctrine "right to rescue nationals". There have been allegations, that this doctrine of international law suffers from insufficient State practice. Because of the urgency that arose when in March 1997 German citizens barricaded themselves in the German Embassy in Tirana, Albania, the executive of the German government did not seek parliamentary approval, which was required according to the German Federal Constitutional Court. In a judgement from 1994, the German Federal Constitutional Court held that any foreign deployment of German military personnel for combat or peacekeeping requires the consent of the Bundestag, that is the German federal parliament.

== Timeline ==
March 13

- On the eve of the operation, the German Minister of Defence, Volker Rühe, decided to reduce the reaction time of German Forces in case of emergency in Albania and ordered the frigate Niedersachsen to enter Albanian waters.

March 14

- Five CH-53G heavy transport helicopters with 89 soldiers from the German SFOR contingent headed from Bosnia to Dubrovnik, Croatia. At the same time in Germany, three C-160 transport planes had been held in readiness to fly to the Balkans. The Niedersachsen waited in readiness in the port of Durrës, Albania.
- 11.30 am - The German Government under Chancellor Helmut Kohl decided to deploy German Forces to evacuate the embassy. Because the German military cannot operate abroad without a permission of the German Parliament, the Government employed emergency rules and only informed the leaders of the parliament and the Defence Committee about the planned operation. The C-160s flew to Podgorica, Montenegro. The task force, consisting of CH-53s and soldiers from combat, supporting, and medical units, lifted off to Tirana.
- 3.39 pm - Although American Forces had cancelled a separate evacuation operation in Tirana after a UH-60 Black Hawk helicopter was hit by small arms fire, Colonel Glawatz decided to continue the approach. The first CH-53 landed on an abandoned airfield near the outskirts of Tirana. Perimeter security was established and the civilians started to board the helicopters. Insurgents in armoured personnel carrier approached the area and attacked the escaping civilians. As the German units returned fire, additional gunmen opened fire from the edge of the air strip. At least 188 rounds were fired at the evacuation force, and one CH-53 helicopter was hit and lightly damaged. At least one Albanian was wounded.
- 4.09 pm - the last helicopter left Tirana.
- The helicopters returned to Montenegro with the refugees after the successful end of the operation; they were then transported to Germany.

== List of evacuated persons ==
Country		Number
Germany	(Germany)	22
Hungary	(Hungary)	14
Japan	(Japan)	13
Austria	(Austria)	11
Czech Republic	(Czech Republic)	5
Denmark	(Denmark)	3
Peru	(Peru)	3
Switzerland	(Switzerland)	3
Egypt	(Egypt)	2
Albania	(Albania)	2
Bosnia and Herzegovina	(Bosnia and Herzegovina)	2
Netherlands	(Netherlands)	2
Poland	(Poland)	2
Others		8
