= United Right of Albania =

Political party in Albania

The United Right of Albania (Partia e te Drejtave te Bashkuara Shqiptare) is a political party in Albania.
