= Fier District =

Defunct (2000) Albanian administrative area

Fier District Rrethi i Fierit
- Former district
- Coordinates: 40°42′N 19°32′E
- Country: Albania
- Dissolved: 2000
- Seat: Fier

Area
  - Total: 850 km^{2} (330 sq mi)

Population (2001)
  - Total: 200,154
  - Density: 240/km^{2} (610/sq mi)
- Time zone: UTC+1 (CET)
  - Summer (DST): UTC+2 (CEST)

Fier District (Albanian: Rrethi i Fierit) was one of the 36 districts of Albania, which were dissolved in July 2000 and replaced by 12 counties. It had a population of 200,154 in 2001, and an area of 850 km^{2} (330 sq mi). Located in the south-west of the country, its capital was the city of Fier. Its territory is now part of Fier County: the municipalities of Fier, Patos and Roskovec.

== Administrative divisions ==
The district consisted of the following municipalities:

- Cakran
- Dërmenas
- Fier
- Frakull
- Kuman
- Kurjan
- Levan
- Libofshë
- Mbrostar
- Patos
- Portëz
- Qendër
- Roskovec
- Ruzhdie
- Strum
- Topojë
- Zharrëz
