= Joan Çetiri =

Iconographer

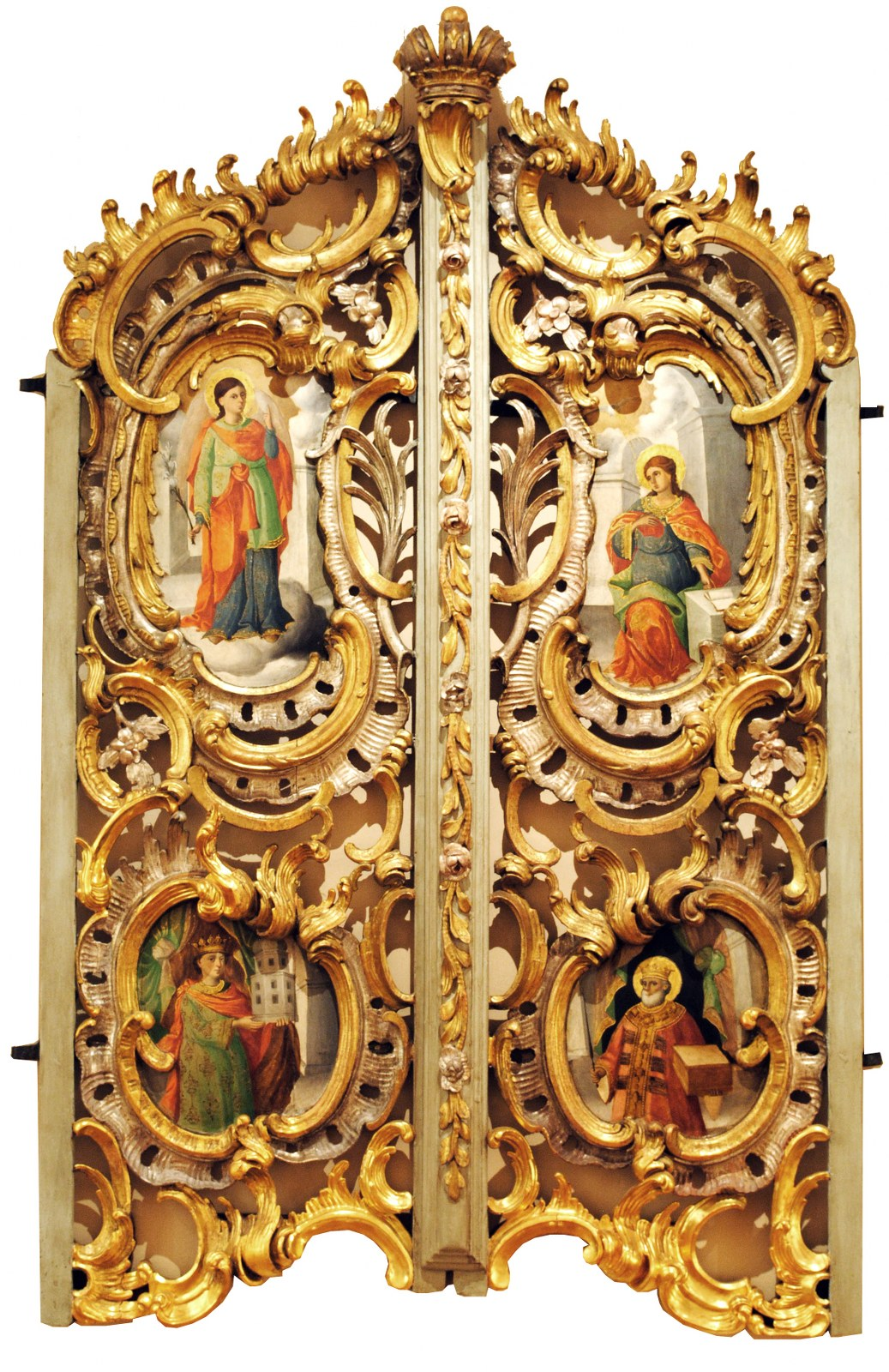
- Work by Çetiri
- Born: Grabova, Ottoman Empire
- Died: after 1813; Albania
- Education: Moscow, Kiev Lavra
- Known for: Orthodox iconostases
- Style: Serbian Baroque

Joan Çetiri (after c. 1812) was an Orthodox iconographer. He was from Grabova, southeastern Albania. Çetiri was active in the Balkans in the second half of the 18th century. His work is defined within the framework of the local iconography tradition which developed in 18th century Albania, while in the Habsburg Balkans he participated in the Serbian Baroque. He painted the Lepavina and Orahovica monasteries, among others.

== Name ==
His name is transcribed as Joan Çetiri in Albanian, Ioannis Tzetiris (Τζετήρης) or Tsetiris (Τσετήρης) among others in Greek and Jovan Četirević (Јован Четиревић Грабован) in Serbian. He wrote his name in different ways depending on the country he lived. In Serbian, Grabovan is a demonym of his homeland. His family's name was Katro, Çetiri or Çetili being the surname used in more recent generations before his birth. He personally referred to himself as Janko.

== Family ==
Çetiri was born in Grabova (now in southeast Albania) as he often stated himself The Orthodox Christian names of his parents were Bartholomaios and Kali. His original family names was Katro, which was changed when the family moved from Lavdar to Grabova. Although he never specified his ethnicity, he was most likely of Aromanian origin, his birth place being almost exclusively Aromanian-inhabited at the time and his associations speaking in favour of this. One Greek scholar (Moutafov) claims that because his family members had Greek Orthodox names, they must have been ethnic Greek, while another (Sisiou) notes that different variants of names were used depending on the country he lived and therefore the different ways his family's names were written can't be used as markers of ethnic identity.

== Career ==
Çetiri had initial training among Greek iconographers, and he could be connected to zograph schools of northern Greece and Epirus. According to his later inscriptions and writings he spoke and wrote in Greek and Serbian. On 6 September 1736 he left his home for Hungary. He used the Slavic diminutive Janko(s). Četirević studied ecclesiastical painting in Moscow in 1746–50. He likely studied at the Kiev Lavra and acquired the Biblia Ectypa of Christoph Weigel, from where his Western baroque inspiration came from. He used the painter's manual Hermeneia Zographikes ("Hermenia of the Art of Painting"). It is suggested that this manual, with Greek and Cyrillic text, was a compilation from Dionysios of Fourna and Russian iconographic handbooks (podlinnik). He painted at the church in Roman in Moldavia in 1754–55 then returned to Grabova and married Angelina on 26 July 1755. It seems that he stayed in Grabova until he travelled to Wallachia in 1761.

In 1769 he brought his family and settled down in Novi Sad (now in Serbia), Habsburg Monarchy. His family was inscribed in the household list of the Serbian Orthodox parish. The family was made up of his mother Kalia (d. 1775), brother Georgios, sister Helena (d. 1775), his wife Angelia (d. 16 April 1818) and six children. The move happened during the sacking of Moscopole, by Turks and Albanians in 1769. He then moved to Osijek (now in Croatia), probably in 1771. Aromanian merchants had an important role in the Orthodox community of Osijek. His brother Anastas had moved to Osijek in 1765. Çetiri's first big project was that of the Church of the Virgin in Orahovica, also contributed to by Aromanian merchants, which he finished in 1775. He then worked on a number of iconostases in northern Croatia, first at Lepavina Monastery and then in the strong Orthodox communities in Koprivnica, Križevci and Bjelovar regions, finishing in 1785. The Orahovica community entrusted Çetiri with repainting the icons of saints Simeon and Sava dating to the first half of the 16th century. He was favoured among the Orthodox in Slavonia and northern Croatia. His distinctive style with initial Greek training contributed to his popularity among the Orthodox that were pressured to Uniate. He occasionally travelled to Hungary to work, and with his colleague Grigorije Popović painted the iconostasis of the newly finished Serbian church at Székesfehérvár.

After 1789 he returned to Albania, where he continued to collaborate with other members of his family. One of the last works of his long career near the age of 90 includes an icon of St. Spyridon for the Cathedral of Dormition of St. Mary in Berat. His last recorded icon is from the Church of St. Nicholas, Toshkëz in 1813.

== Work ==
His professional career began in the Habsburg territories of Slavonia, northern Croatia and Vojvodina, in the service of the Serbian Orthodox Metropolitanate of Karlovci. He worked extensively in Albania, especially in the region of Myzeqe. Outside the Balkans, his work is found in Romania and Moldova. His style was a blend of traditional Greek-Byzantine iconography (zographos) with Western (baroque) influence. His works are found in Serbian Orthodox churches and monasteries scattered across north Croatia, Vojvodina in Serbia and south Hungary.

Çetiri was influenced and followed the local tradition which developed among other iconographers like David Selenica and the Zografi Brothers while in Habsburg territories in his later career broadly he participated in the Serbian Baroque, which replaced the Late Byzantine style in the Metropolitanate of Karlovci through the symbiosis of styles, at first Russian-Ukrainian and later Western European influence. While the earlier iconographers were unnamed, they were replaced by notable painters in the 18th century.

List of works in Albania:

- Church of Mother Mary the God-bearer, Kolkondas (1782)
- Church of St. Nicholas, Vanaj (1795) in collaboration with his brother.
- Church of St. Athanasius, Karavasta (1797) in collaboration with his brother.
- Church of St. George, Fier (1798).
- Church of St. Athanasius in Krutje (1801) in collaboration with his nephew.
- St. George's Church in Strum in collaboration with his nephew.
- Church of St. Athanasius in Vodicë (1806).
- Cathedral of Dormition of St. Mary, Berat (1812).
- Church of St. Nicholas, Toshkëz (1813).

List of works in Croatia, Serbia, Hungary:

- Iconostasis at church of Molovin in Srem (1772).
- Iconostasis at Orahovica Monastery in Slavonia (1775).
- Iconostasis at Lepavina Monastery in northern Croatia (1775).
- Iconostasis at church of Székesfehérvár in Hungary, together with Grigorije Popović (1776).
- Iconostasis at church of Veliki Poganac (1779).
- Iconostasis at church of Velike Sredice (1780).
- Iconostasis at church of Vojakovac (1782).
- Iconostasis at church of Slatina (March 1785).
- Many icons, held at monasteries, churches and museums.

== See also ==
- Hristofor Žefarović
- Teodor Ilić Češljar
- Stefan Tenecki
- Dimitrije Bačević
- Georgije Bakalović
- Jovan Pačić
- Stefan Gavrilović
- Teodor Kračun
- Janko Halkozović
- Jakov Orfelin
- Petar Nikolajević Moler
- Konstantin Danil

== Sources ==
- Cvetkovski, Saso (2018). "On a Lesser Known Icon By The Brothers George And John Tzetiris From Grabovo From 1791, Depicting The Seven Slavic Saints St. Nahum And St. John Vladimir". Monumenta. 2–3 – via Academia.edu.
- Davidov, Dinko (1990). Споменици Будимске епархије. Belgrade: Balkanološki institut SANU. pp. 59–61, 381, 418. ISBN 978-86-07-00480-5.
- Jovanović, M. (1965). "Јован Четиревић Грабован" [Jovan Četirević Grabovan]. Зборник за ликовне уметности Матице српске. 1. Нови Сад: 199–222.
- Kučeković, Aleksandra (2021). "ЕРМИНИЈА СЛИКАРА ЈОВАНА ЧЕТИРЕВИЋА ГРАБОВАНА–ЗАПИСИ И ЦРТЕЖИ". Zbornik Matice Srpske za Likovne Umetnosti. 49: 61–83.
- Kučeković, Aleksandra (2020). "Painters Jovan Četirević Grabovan and Grigorije Popović. Addenda to the Biographies of the Master and the Apprentice" (PDF). Saopštenja. LII: 137–152.
- Kučeković, Aleksandra (2018). "Jovan Četirević Grabovan – an 18th-Century Itinerant Orthodox Painter. Some Ethnic and Artistic Considerations". Изкуствоведски четения. 1. Институт за изследване на изкуствата, Българска академия на науките. ISSN 1313-2342.
- Kučeković, Aleksandra (2004). "Ikonostas Jovana Četirevića Grabovana u Orahovici". Zbornik radova Narodnog muzeja-Istorija umetnosti. 17 (2): 219–242.
- Llukani, Andrea (2021). Arti i ikonografisë në Shqipëri [The art of iconography in Albania]. Academy of Sciences of Albania. ISBN 9789928339355.
- Moutafov, Emmanuel (2002). "Ioannes Tsetiris from Grabovo or Jovan Chetirevich Grabovan?". Ζητήματα μεταβυζαντινής ζωγραφικής. Αθήνα: 217–229.
- Nicolau, Irina (2002). Come On, Now!: A Personal Journey Through the World of the Aromanians. East European Monographs. ISBN 978-0-88033-495-2.
- Popović, Dušan J. (1990). Srbi u Vojvodini (II.): Od Karlovačkog mira 1699 do Temišvarskog sabora 1790. Novi Sad: Matica srpska. pp. 421–422.
- Sisiou, Ioannis (2014). "ΤΟ ΕΡΓΟ ΤΟΥ ΙΩΑΝΝΟΥ ΤΖΕΤΗΡΗ ΣΤΑ ΒΕΛΕΓΡΑΔΑ". ART AND ITS ROLE IN THE HISTORY: BETWEEN DURABILITY AND TRANSIENT -ISMS Dedicated to the Memory of prof. Miodrag Jovanović, Ph.D (1932–2013. pp. 255–275. ISBN 978-86-6349-034-5.
- Timotijević, Miroslav (1996). Српско барокно сликарство [Serbian Baroque Painting]. Матица српска Оделење за ликовне уметности.
- Todić, B. (2010). "Скица за портрет Јована Четиревића Грабована". Радови о српској уметности и уметницима XVIII века. Нови Сад: 355–387.
