= Fier (disambiguation) =

Fier is a city in Albania.

Fier may also refer to:

== Places ==
- Fier County, one of 12 counties of Albania
- Fier District, one of 36 districts in Albania, within the above county
- Fier (river) in eastern France

== People ==
- Alexandr Fier, a Brazilian chess grandmaster
- Anton Fier, an American musician
