= Gjanica =

River in Albania

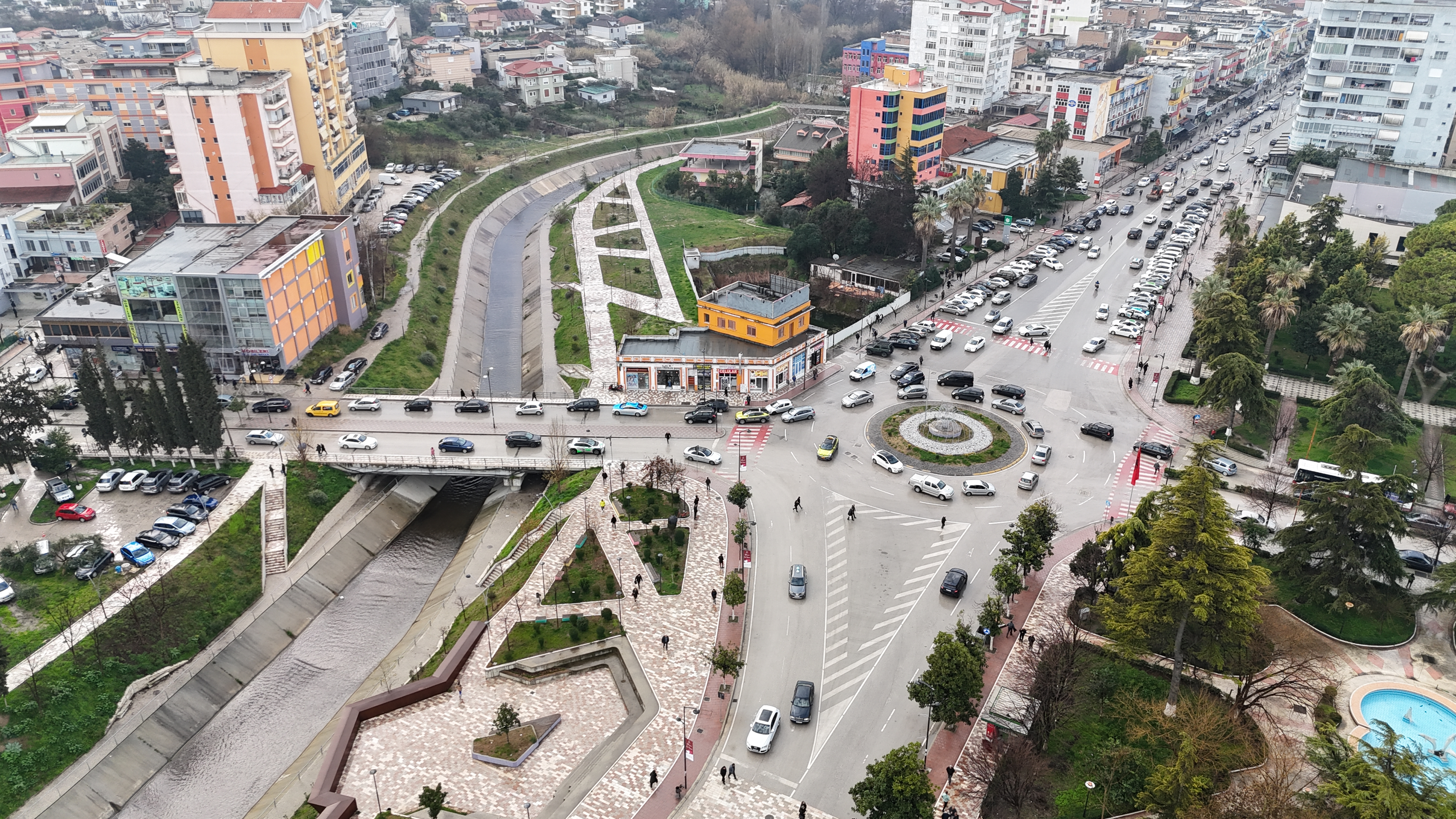
- Gjanica flowing through Fier

Location
- Country: Albania

Physical characteristics
- Mouth: Seman
  - coordinates: 40°44′59″N 19°34′23.56″E
- Length: 67.7 km (42.1 mi)
- Basin size: 234.1 km^{2} (90.4 sq mi)

Basin features
- Progression: Lumarë ≈ Metoh ↝ Seman ↝ Adriatic Sea

Gjanica is a river in southwestern Albania and a major tributary of the Seman river. Rising on the southern slopes of Mount Shpirag, it flows through the municipalities of Mallakastër and Fier before joining the Seman near Mbrostar. Passing through the city of Fier, the river has long influenced the area’s settlement patterns, agriculture and industrial development.

== Etymology ==
In antiquity the river was known as Argias. The present name, Gjanica, emerged during the Middle Ages. According to historian Nishat Hamitaj, the name is believed to derive from the earlier form "Glavenicë", which is associated with the historic settlement of Glavenica and Mount Gllavë.

== Course ==
The Gjanica is formed near the village of Aranitas by the confluence of the Lumarë and Metoh streams in the hills of Mallakastër. While most geographical works place its source on the southern slopes of Mount Shpirag, some local historians identify its headwaters more specifically with Mount Gllavë.

From its source, the river flows north through Panahor, Ballsh, Ndrenovë, Belishovë, Visokë, Patos-Fshat, Kasnicë, Kraps and Plyk before crossing the city of Fier and emptying into the Seman River near Mbrostar.

The river’s reported measurements vary among published sources. Older geographical studies describe it as approximately 42 km (26 mi) long with a drainage basin covering 228 km² (88 sq mi), whereas figures cited from the Albanian Hydrometeorological Institute give a length of 67.7 km (42.1 mi) and a basin area of 234.1 km² (90.4 sq mi). Construction of the Lumara I and Lumara II reservoirs during the 1970s and 1980s significantly altered the river’s upper course and hydrological regime.

== History ==
Archaeological evidence indicates that the Gjanica valley has been inhabited since prehistoric times. Excavations conducted by Albanian-American archaeological teams between 1998 and 2000 uncovered traces of Paleolithic occupation near Portëz on the river’s lower right bank, dating to around 40,000 years ago.

During antiquity, the valley became one of the most densely populated areas of southern Illyria. Settlements flourished along the river, including the ancient city of Orgesos near present-day Margëlliç and another unidentified Illyrian settlement near Gurëzezë. The fertile floodplain supported an extensive agricultural economy sustained by irrigation works.

Among the most notable ancient hydraulic structures was the Roman dam at Kraps, built during the 1st century AD to regulate water for irrigation. A second, smaller Roman dam, known as "Prita e Patosit", was constructed farther downstream near Patos.

The river also supported numerous watermills during the Ottoman era and throughout the 19th century. Historical sources describe an interconnected network of grain and wool mills supplied by irrigation channels that distributed water across the valley and contributed to the region’s agricultural economy.

Large-scale engineering projects transformed the valley during Albania’s communist period in the 1960s and 1970s. Industrial developments included the Ballsh Oil Refinery, the Fier Chemical and Energy Complex, expanded irrigation networks and the 26 km (16 mi) Fier–Ballsh railway.

== See also ==
- List of rivers of Albania
