= Kosmas the Aetolian =

Monk in the Greek Orthodox Church

Saint Kosmas the Aetolian
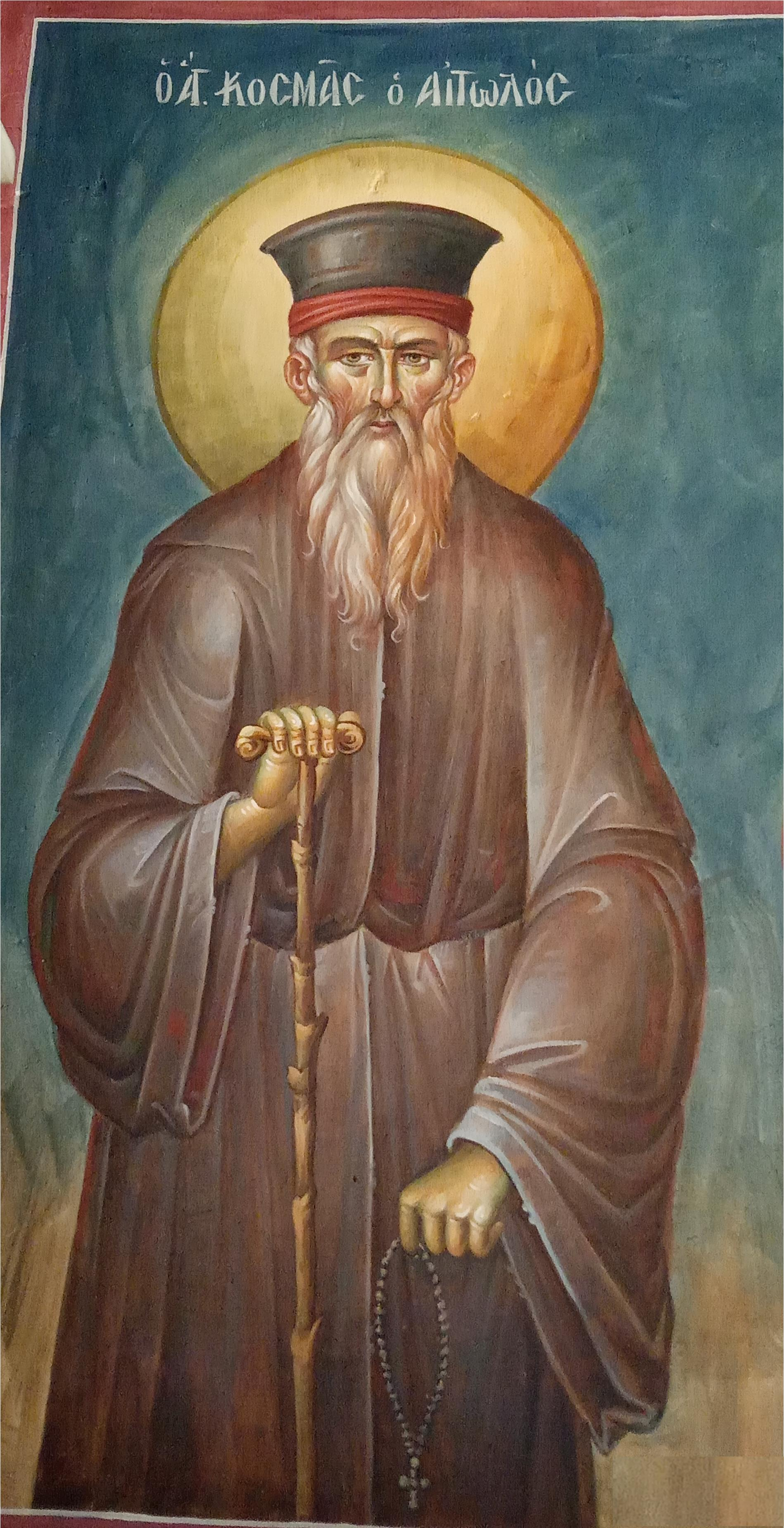
- Mural icon of Saint Kosmas

Equal to the Apostles and Teacher of the Greek Nation
- Born: c. 1714; Aetolia
- Died: 24 August 1779; Kolkondas, Pashalik of Berat, Ottoman Empire (now in Fier District, modern Albania)
- Venerated in: Eastern Orthodox Church
- Canonized: 20 April 1961
- Major shrine: Metropolitan Cathedral of Athens
- Feast: 24 August

Kosmas the Aetolian, sometimes Cosmas the Aetolian or Patrokosmas "Father Kosmas" (Greek: Κοσμᾶς ὁ Αἰτωλός, Kosmas Etolos; c. 1714 – 24 August 1779) was a monk, who is venerated as a saint in the Eastern Orthodox Church. He is recognized as one of the originators of the twentieth-century religious movements in Greece. He is also noted for his prophecies.

Saint Kosmas, the "Equal to the Apostles," was officially proclaimed a Saint by the Orthodox Church of Constantinople on 20 April 1961 under the tenure of Ecumenical Patriarch Athenagoras. His feast day is celebrated on 24 August, the date of his martyrdom.

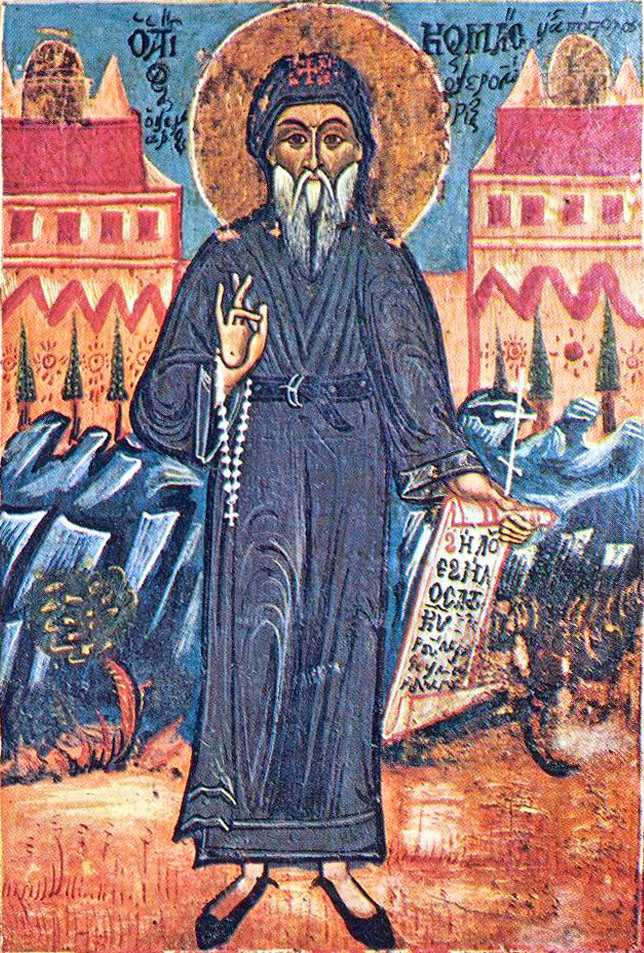
Icon of St. Kosmas the Aetolian

== Life ==
Kosmas was born in the Greek village of Mega Dendron near the town of Thermo in the region of Aetolia. He studied Greek and theology before becoming a monk after a trip to Mount Athos, where he also attended the local Theological Academy.

After two years Kosmas left Athos. He studied rhetoric in Constantinople for a time. In 1760 he was authorized by Patriarch Serapheim II (who had marked anti-Ottoman tendencies) to begin missionary tours in the villages of Thrace – later extended to what would form the areas of both Western Greece and Northern Greece. The Patriarch had reportedly been worried at the increasing rate of Christians converting to Islam in these areas.

Over sixteen years, Kosmas established many church schools in villages and towns. He called upon Christians to establish schools and learn Biblical Koine Greek, so that they might understand the Scriptures better and generally educate themselves.

After the Orlov Revolt of 1770 in the Peloponnese (which was provoked by the Orlov brothers with the support of Catherine II of the Russian Empire), Kosmas started to preach in what is now Southern Albania, then under the rule of Ahmet Kurt Pasha, governor of the Pashalik of Berat.

His preachings had aroused the opposition of the rich and powerful and others who felt their position threatened, such as the kotsampasides (Greek "village elders" whose power and influence was bound up with Ottoman power).

Kosmas was also viewed with suspicion by officials of the Venetian Republic, then in its final stages of decline, which ruled parts of the territory where he was active. For example, in 1779 he is said to have visited the Venetian-ruled town of Preveza and founded there a Greek school, which would be the only school of the city during the 18th century – an act which the Venetian authorities might have considered as undermining their rule. The Venetians' suspicions are attested in spy reports about Kosmas preserved in the Venetian archives. In contrast, Kosmas had considerable support from other Christians and even from some Turks.

In his sermons Kosmas often refers negatively to the Jews. Nevertheless, in one of his preachings he stated specifically that: "Those who wrong Christians, Jews or Turks (could refer to Muslims in general) would be paid back for the injustice they committed".

One effect of his preaching was to transfer the holding of the weekly bazaar (fair) from Sunday to Saturday, which brought economic losses to Jews – barred by their religion from engaging in business on Sabbath. Some researchers believe that for that reason, Jews in Epirus were involved in his conviction by the Ottoman authorities.

Accused of being a Russian agent, he was seized by Ottoman authorities. On 24 August 1779, he was executed at Kolkondas, Fier District, near the mouth of the Seman river (in present-day Albania). There were no formal charges brought against him, nor was he put on trial before being executed – leading to various theories, persisting up to the present, about who might have wanted him dead.

== Legacy ==
In 1813, Ali Pasha, the de facto independent Muslim Albanian ruler of Ottoman Epirus, southern Albanian and Macedonia, and an enemy of the Sultan, had a church built near the site of Kosmas' execution, in which the remains of Kosmas were placed.

In 1984, the remains were transferred from the St. Kosmas' Monastery in Kolkondas, where he was killed, to the Archaeological Museum of Fier. Other relics of the saint are kept in the Metropolitan Cathedral of Athens. Saint Kosmas' pilgrimage is also revered in some Greek nationalist circles. The latter are associated with the Northern Epirus issue and support the annexation of this region to Greece. Although a hellenizer, Saint Kosmas the Aetolian is still highly regarded by Orthodox Albanians for the message that he gave.

There are numerous popular religious texts attributed to St. Kosmas. Best known are the five "Didaches" and the "Prophecies". An account stated that he prophesied the unification of Greece and Epirus. There survives, however, no original manuscript of these texts written personally by St. Kosmas, and none can be dated with certainty. His writings are known only from second- or third-hand transcriptions. It is believed that these texts are based on Kosmas' preachings but were written and copied mostly after his death.
