= Presentation of the Theotokos Monastery, Myrtia =

Greek Orthodox monastery in Western Greece

Presentation of the Theotokos Monastery
- Ιερά Μονή Εισοδίων της Θεοτόκου
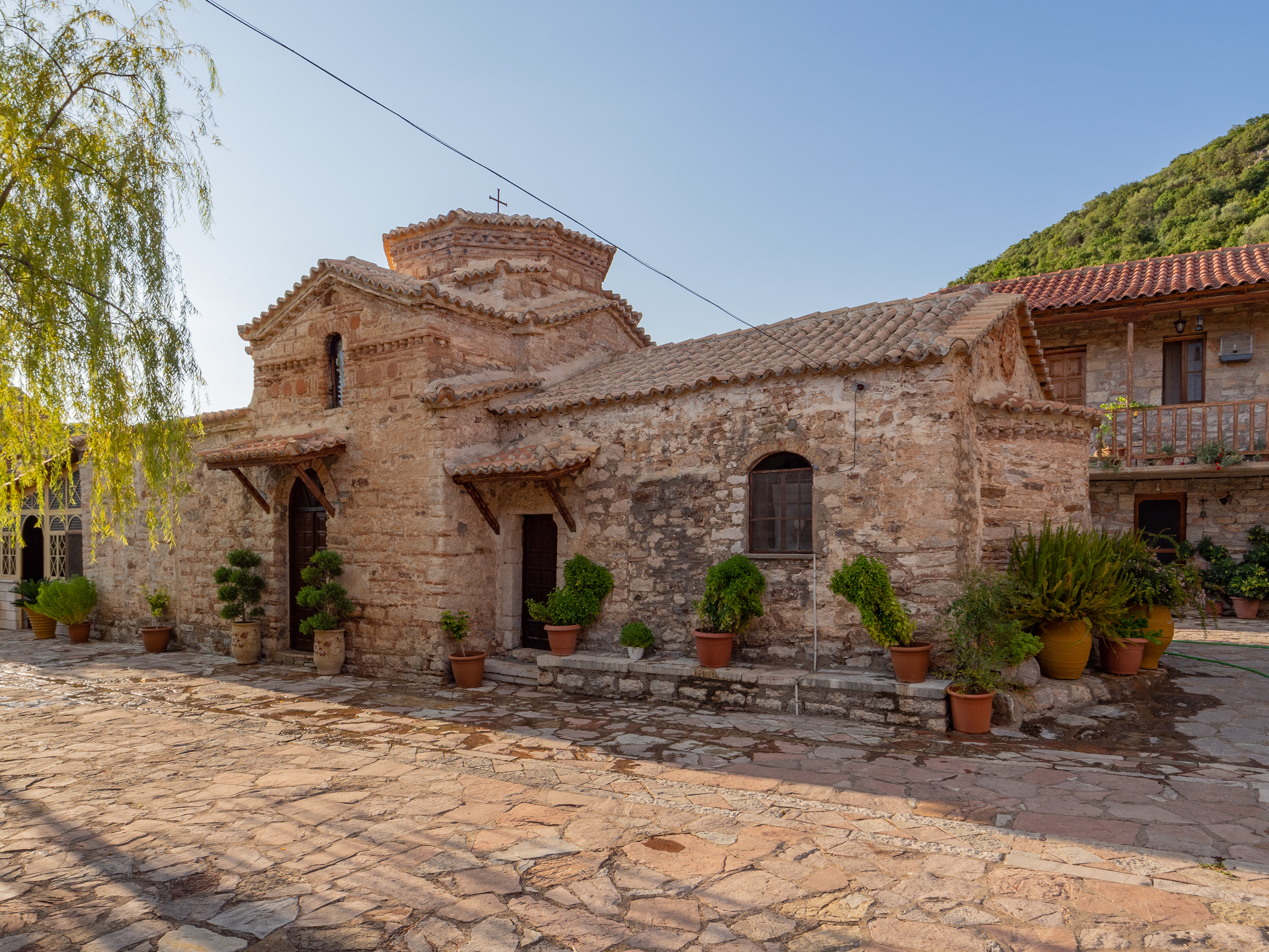
- The monastery exterior in 2022

- Location of the monastery in Greece
- Interactive map of Presentation of the Theotokos Monastery

Monastery information
- Full name: Holy Monastery of the Presentation of Mary of Myrtle
- Other name: Panagia Phaneromeni Monastery
- Order: Ecumenical Patriarchate of Constantinople
- Denomination: Greek Orthodox Church
- Dedication: Presentation of the Theotokos
- Celebration: August 6; November 21
- Diocese: Metropolis of Aetolia-Acarnania

Architecture
- Status: Monastery
- Functional status: Active
- Style: Byzantine
- Completion date: 1200 AD

Site
- Location: Myrtia, Thermo, Aetolia-Acarnania, Western Greece
- Country: Greece
- Coordinates: 38°35′39″N 21°36′50″E

The Presentation of the Theotokos Monastery (Greek: Ιερά Μονή Εισοδίων της Θεοτόκου) or Panagia Phaneromeni Monastery (Μονή Παναγίας Φανερωμένης) is a Greek Orthodox monastery, located in the prefecture of Aetolia-Acarnania, outside the village of Myrtia, on the road that connects Agrinio with Thermo, in the Western region of Greece. It is celebrated on November 21 (at the Presentation of the Theotokos) while the chapel of the Transfiguration, located in the monastery, celebrates on August 6.

== Overview ==
The katholikon of the monastery is a cross-in-square church and was built in the 16th century, except for the sanctuary, which is older. The sanctuary was built as a separate church in the 11th-12th centuries and four centuries later the church that is today the main church of the monastery's katholikon was attached to its west. In the 17th century, the narthex was built.

The church's frescoes are not from the same time period. There are frescoes from the 12th and 13th centuries, from 1491, 1539 and 1712. The oldest fresco is the Dormition, dating from the 12th or 13th century. The arch and apse of the sanctuary were painted in 1491 by the painter Digenis Xenos according to the Cretan School, while the main church was painted by an unknown painter in 1539, belonging to the Epirote School.

During the Turkish occupation, the Monastery of Myrtia was a center of education and Kosmas the Aetolian lived there for a while.

After the Battle of Myrtia, on 10 July 1943, the German occupation troops set fire to the monastery buildings in retaliation, but the katholikon was saved.

== See also ==
- Church of Greece
- List of monasteries in Greece
