= St. George's Church, Strum =

18th-century church in Albania

Coordinates: 40.7595°N 19.7296°E

Saint George's Church, Strum
- Kisha e Shën Gjergjit (Strum) (Albanian)
- Interactive map of Saint George's Church, Strum

History
- Built: 1782

Site notes
- Governing body: DRKK Fier

Cultural Monument of Albania
- Type: Under protection
- Criteria: I
- Part of: 30.05.1970
- Reference no.: FR012

Saint George's Church, built in 1782 and painted by the Çetiri Brothers from Grabovë e Sipërme, is a cultural heritage monument in Strum, Fier County, Albania.

== History and description ==
The church lies 1 kilometre (0.62 mi) north of Strum, to the right of the highway connecting Strum with the village of Suk i Poshtëm. 10 metres (33 ft) long on the sides and 3.5 metres (11 ft) high, the rectangular church is oriented east to west and flat-roofed. The two gates face north and west. The nave and apse were once covered in frescoes that have deteriorated, except for the western portion of the north wall, where figures of five saints can be discerned. The Çetiri Brothers of Grabovë e Sipërme painted the art in 1782, most likely Joan whose work at St. George's in Fier is similar. The vaulted gate under the bell tower is original, 1.8 metres (5.9 ft) high, and built of carved white stone with columns supporting an arch decorated with two rosettes. The Greek inscription above the gate dates the church to April 1782.

The church was built of limestone from nearby quarries along with marble from ancient ruins, and lime mortar and interior plaster were used to bind them. The iconostasis and other ceremonial objects are missing, but on the unpaved floor of the shrine near the apse are two remnants of ancient grooved columns and a marble fragment of a capital built in the Doric order, likely harvested nearby in Dimale. The small chapel on the northeastern side is similarly dilapidated but includes two small apses where worshipers once lit candles. The building originally was surrounded on three sides (northern, western, and southern) by a stone wall that was 0.7 metres (2.3 ft) wide and 2.5 metres (8.2 ft) high; only the western portion by the bell tower remains. The belfry, which is 7 metres (23 ft) high, was renovated in 1935 as per an inscription reading "Repair of bells under the care of Jan Çobo and Lil Stambolliu on August 25, 1935 by His Excellency Vasil Lapi."
