= Lepavina =

Lepavina may refer to:

- Lepavina Monastery, a Serbian Orthodox monastery in northern Croatia
- Lepavina, Croatia, a village near Sokolovac, Koprivnica-Križevci County
