= Kolkondas =

- Village
- Location within Albania
- Coordinates: 40°48′28″N 19°32′25″E
- Country: Albania
- County: Fier
- Municipality: Fier
- Administrative unit: Libofshë
- Time zone: UTC+1 (CET)
  - Summer (DST): UTC+2 (CEST)

Kolkondas is a community in the Libofshë municipal unit, Fier County in southern Albania.

It was in Kolkondas that in 1779 the notable Greek monk and preacher (later canonised) Cosmas of Aetolia was arrested and executed by the then Ottoman authorities. In the place of execution the St. Cosmas' monastery was built.
