= Libofshë massacre =

1992 robbery and mass murder in Fier, Albania

- Native name: Masakra e Libofshës
- Location: 40°49′45″N 19°33′58″E; Libofshë, Fier, Albania
- Date: 29 May 1992; 00:45 – c. 01:45 (CEST)
- Target: Pupa family
- Weapons: Axe; Crowbar
- Deaths: 5
- Perpetrators: Dritëbardh Çuko; Josif Çuko
- Motive: Robbery, revenge for ending engagement with the perpetrators' sister
- Convictions: Murder

On 29 May 1992, five members of the Pupa family were killed during a robbery in Libofshë, Albania. Parents Petrit and Zenepe, son Agim, daughter-in-law Rajmonda and infant grandchild Magdalena Pupa, who was seven months old, were all bludgeoned to death. The perpetrators, Dritëbardh and Josif Çuko, were caught four days later and executed by hanging in a public display in June. The Çuko brothers were the last people to be executed in Albania before its abolishment of the death penalty for non-treason or military-related offences in 2000 and the last people to be executed in public in Europe.

== Murders ==
At about 0:45, the apartment of the Pupa family was broken into via the skylight in the children's bedroom with the window bars removed. The first victim was 30-year-old Agim Pupa, who was sleeping in bed, dying instantly of a blow to the head from the blunt side of an axe. Agim's wife Rajmonda awoke and was also killed on the spot, after attempting to shield her head with a hand. Agim's mother Zenepe was taken hostage and tied up, with her husband Petrit being killed with the axe during a struggle with the home invaders. Zenepe Pupa was tortured for about an hour, being forced to reveal the location of her son's savings, subsequently leaving her heavily injured in the kitchen. Before leaving, the perpetrators killed Agim and Rajmonda's infant daughter Magdalena because she was crying in her crib, striking the baby in the neck with a crowbar. The bodies were discovered at 6:45 the same morning by another son, Mustafa, after a shepherd informed him that his father had not shown up to his stall at the livestock market. Zenepe Pupa was initially recovered alive, but she died in a hospital two hours later.

== Investigation ==
Public Order Police immediately suspected a revenge killing as part of a family feud, as Agim Pupa had previously had several engagements to local women, which were all ended before marriage, leading to threats by their families. Investigators also raised the likely motive of robbery, as the Pupa family was wealthy. A suitcase belonging to the family was found broken open near the village outskirts. Both theories were investigated by two units of the Public Order branches of Fier, Lushnje, and Elbasan, under coordination of the Public Order Directorate, Tirana. As part of investigations into organised crime, two local criminals were detained to act as informants via wiretapping, although only one ultimately cooperated.

Four days after the murders, criminologist Llazar Plaku of Public Order Branch, Vlora, determined that fingerprints on safety glass at the Pupa home belonged to 24-year-old Dritëbardh Çuko (often rendered Ditbardh Cuko outside of Albania), a local villager previously convicted of theft. He was arrested, his apartment was searched and information was gathered on his social circles. The apartment search yielded bloodied clothing. Further analysis of the glass also showed the fingerprints of Dritëbardh's brother, 22-year-old Josif Çuko (alternatively spelled Josef Cuko). The Çuko brothers subsequently admitted to targeting the family both to steal their money and seek vengeance for their sister, who was one of the women whom Agim had broken up with. The Çuko sister and a friend of the brothers were also detained as participants. The Çuko brothers had stolen 5,000 lek, the equivalent of US$50.

Fier County criminologist K. Andoni had previously discounted the possibility that the crime was committed by residents of the area, due to which police did not take fingerprints of local villagers. This was despite the fact that police already received report that Dritëbardh Çuko was seen near the Pupa home before the murders. Andoni's conclusion delayed the inclusion of Dritëbardh Çukohe as a suspect until a day after the crime. Due to the quick resolultion of the case, the Ministry of Public Order awarded the investigation team with 35,000 lek.

== Trial and execution ==
Dritëbardh and Josif Çuko were convicted of murder and sentenced to death within two weeks of the massacre. A request for clemency was denied on 23 June 1992. They were hanged in a public execution on 25 June, held in the town square of Fier. They declined to make last statements. After their executions, their bodies were left hanging until the evening of 26 June for public viewing.

== Aftermath ==
The quick trial and public execution were thought to have been a means to gain popularity for newly elected president Sali Berisha and his Democratic Party of Albania. The public was overwhelmingly in favor of the executions, with some spectators saying the Çuko brothers should have been tortured beforehand. One spectator remarked, "It's excellent that they have hanged them but it would have been far better had they burnt them alive or cut them to pieces like meat and rubbed salt into their wounds."

In November 2021, following the rape and murder of 8-year-old Mateo Vasiu by 38-year-old Klodian Çalamani in Greçalli, Fier, local residents protested for the reinstatement of the death penalty, publicly voicing support for Çalamani to be hanged in same square where the execution of the Çukos took place. Çalamani was sentenced to life imprisonment in July 2023.
