= Grigorije Popović =

Romanian and Serbian painter

Grigorije Popović or Grigorije Popovici (Serbian: Григорије Поповић; 1749 – after 1803) was a Romanian and Serbian icon painter who worked in the Habsburg Empire (what is today Romania and Hungary). Today Romanian scholars view Popović as "one of the most important painters of Ţara Românească in the last quarter of the 18th century," with signed and attributed works from 1776 until 1803.

Popović was born in 1749 in Wallachia. In 1766, as a 16-year-old Popović joined Jovan Četirević Grabovan as an assistant painter, according to his own notebook entry, written at Lepavina Monastery in July 1775, where he also wrote that Jovan Cetirevic Grabovan doubled his salary, raising it to 80 florins. In August of that same year, a rearranged agreement again raised his salary as Popović took on a larger part of the workload.

Also, Grabovan and Popović were commissioned to paint the iconostasis in the Serbian Orthodox Church in Székesfehérvár by the Eparchy of Buda in Hungary. The dedicatory inscription under the icon of Saint George states that the iconostasis was completed in July 1776 by the "effort and handcraft" of Jovan Četirević Grabovan and Grigorije Popović. After that, the two parted ways and Popović became a master in his own right after finishing his 10-year stint as an assistant, learning the craft and working with Jovan Četirević Grabovan. Both Romanian and Serbian art scholars agreed that the two have not worked together after 1776.

== See also ==
- Jovan Četirević Grabovan
