= Frakull e Madhe =

- Village
- Location within Albania
- Coordinates: 40.659°N 19.501°E
- Country: Albania
- County: Fier
- Municipality: Fier
- Administrative unit: Frakull
- Time zone: UTC+1 (CET)
  - Summer (DST): UTC+2 (CEST)

Frakull e Madhe is a village in the former municipality of Frakull in Fier County, Albania. At the 2015 local government reform it became part of the municipality Fier.

== Notable people ==
- Nezim Frakulla 18th century Albanian poet.
