= Thermo, Greece =

Town in Aetolia, Greece

Thermo Θέρμο
- Municipality
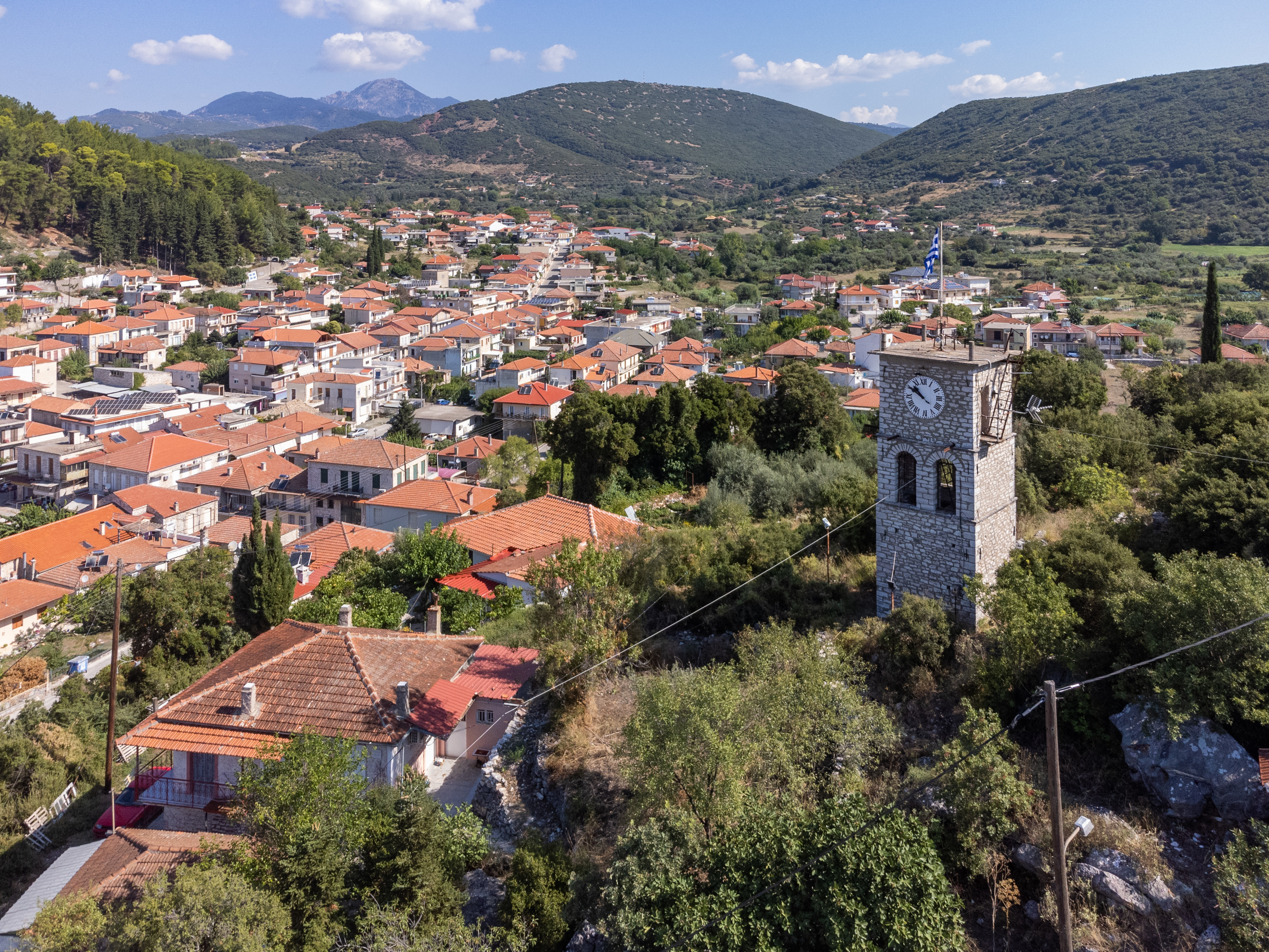
- Aerial view of Thermo

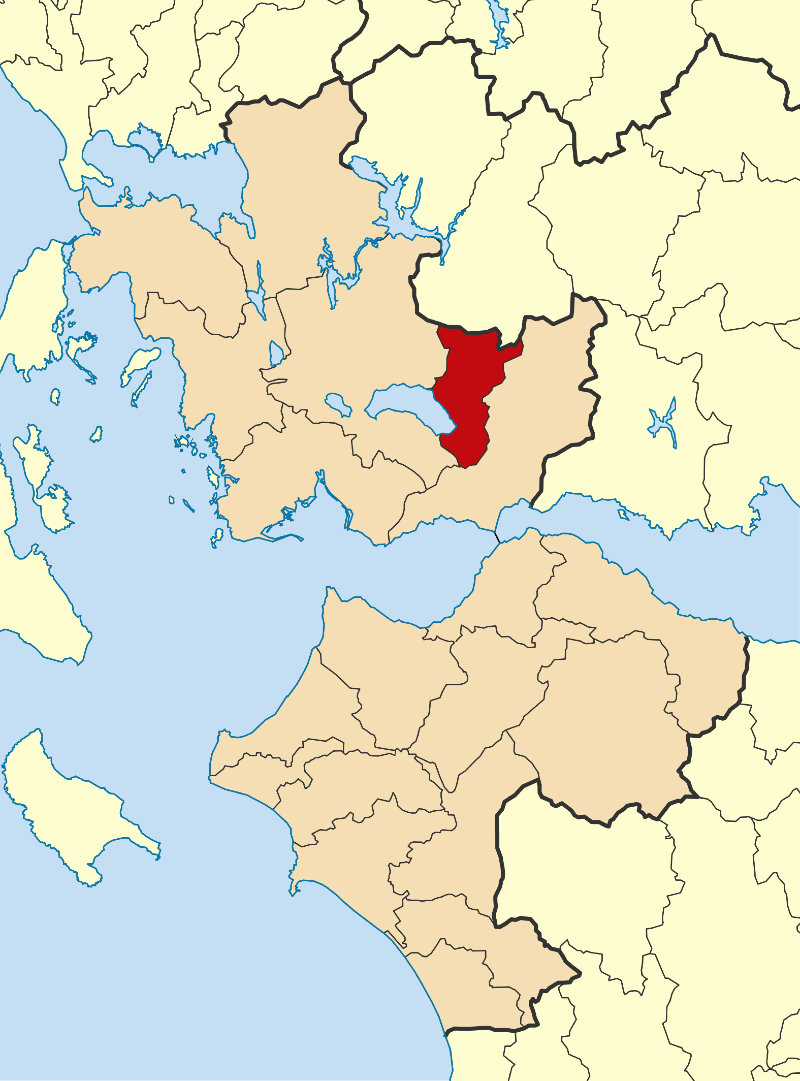

- Location within Greece
- Coordinates: 38°35′N 21°40′E
- Country: Greece
- Administrative region: West Greece
- Regional unit: Aetolia-Acarnania
- Districts: 23

Area
  - Municipality: 333.7 km^{2} (128.8 sq mi)

Population (2021)
  - Municipality: 5,712
  - Density: 17.12/km^{2} (44.33/sq mi)
  - Community: 1,823
- Time zone: UTC+2 (EET)
  - Summer (DST): UTC+3 (EEST)
- Postal code: 300 08
- Area code: 26440

Thermo (Greek: Θέρμο, before 1915: Κεφαλόβρυσον Kefalovryson) is a town and a municipality in Aetolia-Acarnania, Greece. It is located in the southeastern part of the regional unit, largely between Lake Trichonida (the largest natural lake in Greece) and the southern border of Evrytania. It has a land area of 333.701 km^{2} (129 sq mi) and a population of 5,712 inhabitants (2021 census).

Its municipal seat is the town of Thermo. The village of Megas Dendros (part of the community of Thermo) was the birthplace of Cosmas of Aetolia. Thermo took its name from the ancient city Thermos, that was located near the present town.

== Subdivisions ==
The municipality Thermo consists of the following communities:

- Thermo (Thermo, Koulouria, Mandra, Marathos, Megas Dendros, Taxiarchis)
- Avarikos (Avarikos, Pini)
- Agia Sofia (Agia Sofia, Mavrovoros, Pournara)
- Aetopetra
- Amvrakia
- Analipsis (Analipsis, Kaimena Ampelia, Koftra, Marathoula, Paliouria)
- Argyro Pigadi (Argyro Pigadi, Theotokos)
- Diasellaki
- Diplatanos
- Drymon (Drymon, Agia Triada, Ano Drymon, Koskinas)
- Kaloudi (Kaloudi, Dounaiika, Marathias)
- Kato Chrysovitsa (Kato Chrysovitsa, Diasello, Dosoula, Koutsomilia)
- Kokkinovrysi (Ampelia, Agios Theodoros, Kokkinovrysi)
- Koniska (Koniska, Agios Ioannis, Poulinos)
- Lefko
- Myrtea (Myrtea, Loutra, Palaiomylos, Perevos)
- Nerochori (Nerochori, Meligkova, Misampella)
- Pamfi
- Perkos
- Petrochori (Petrochori, Prionaiika)
- Sitaralona
- Chaliki Amvrakias (Dafni, Ladikou, Nerosyrtis, Chaliki)
- Chrysovitsa (Chrysovitsa, Dokimia, Roggia)

== See also ==
- Thermos (Aetolia) archaeological site
- Aetolian League
- Presentation of the Theotokos Monastery, Myrtia
