= St. Cosmas' and St. Mary's Church, Kolkondas =

Historic site in Kolkondas, Fier, Albania

St. Cosmas' and St. Mary's Church
- Kisha e Shën Kozmait dhe Shën Mërisë (Albanian)
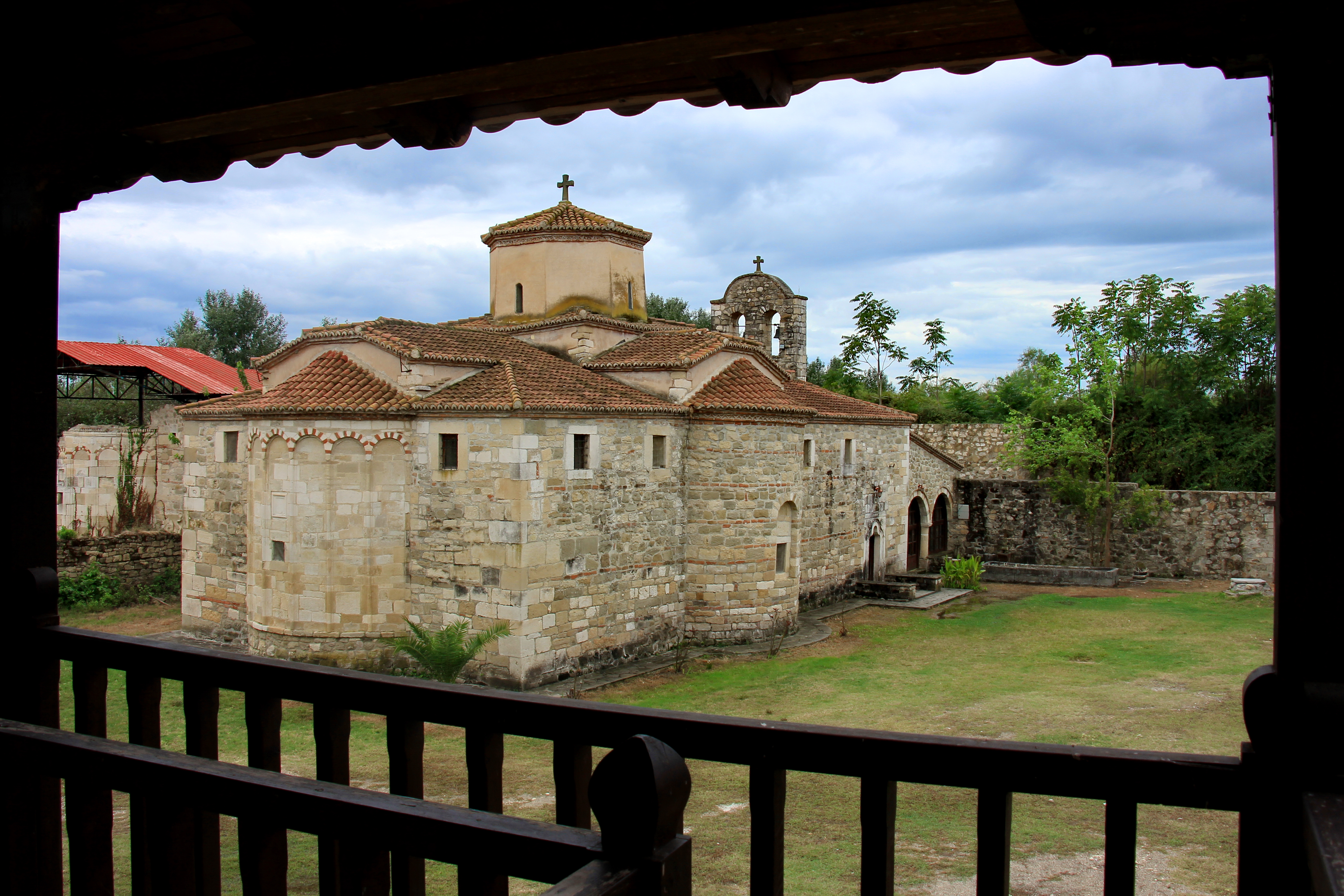
- Image of the churches exterior
- Interactive map of St. Cosmas' and St. Mary's Church
- 40.8028°N 19.5434°E
- Location: Kolkondas

History
- Built for: Relics of Kosmas the Aetolian

Cultural Monument of Albania

St. Cosmas' and St. Mary's Church (Albanian: Kisha e Shën Kozmait dhe Shën Mërisë) is a church in Kolkondas, Fier County, Albania. It is a Cultural Monument of Albania, and is dedicated to the Virgin Mary and to Cosmas of Aetolia.

== Construction ==
In 1813, Ali Pasha, the de facto independent Muslim Albanian ruler of Ottoman Epirus, southern Albanian and Macedonia, and an enemy of the Sultan, had a church built near the site of Kosmas' execution, in which the remains of Kosmas were placed.

The relics of St. Kosmas rest in the Archdiocese in Tirana for security reasons. They rest in a simple wooden coffin. The skull was stolen in 1917 by Austria-Hungarians and likely rest today in a museum in Vienna. The lower jaw is in the Monastery of Saint Nicholas in Andros. His right hand rests in the Church of Saint Kosmas in Konitsi. Also, portions of relics of his fingers and toes rest in many places, such as Ioannina, the Monastery of Dousikou, and other places. Portions of his relics were also given by Archbishop Anastasios of Albania to the Church of Greece, which rest in the Metropolitan Cathedral of Athens. Another portion is in the Monastery of Saint Kosmas in Aitoloakarnania.
