= Bosniaks in Albania =

Ethnic group in Albania

Bosniaks in Albania Boshnjakët në Shqipëri Bošnjaci u Albaniji
Total population
- 2,963 (2023 census)

Regions with significant populations
- Durrës

Languages
- Bosnian · Albanian

Religion
- Sunni Islam

Related ethnic groups
- Bosniaks

Bosniaks in Albania (Albanian: Boshnjakët në Shqipëri; Bosnian: Bošnjaci u Albaniji Croatian pronunciation: [boʃɲatsi u albaniji] are an ethnic minority living within the Republic of Albania.

== Demographics ==
The Bosniak community of the Shijak area whose presence dates back to 1875 inhabits almost entirely the village of Borakaj and in the neighbouring village Koxhas they live alongside Albanians and form a minority. Bosniaks from these settlements have also settled in Durrës, Shijak and in 1924 some went and settled in the village of Libofshë where they have mostly become linguistically integrated.

== History ==
With the emergence of the Great Eastern Crisis, in particular the events of the Herzegovina Uprising in 1875 Bosniaks from the Herzegovina Mostar area migrated and resettled in Northern Albania in the Shijak area. On October 13, 2017, Albania passed a Law on National Minorities that recognised nine minorities, including the Bosniak one. Despite the great isolation, the Bosniaks in Albania have preserved their language, culture and customs to this day.

== Status ==
On October 13, 2017, the Albanian Parliament passed the Law on the Protection of National Minorities in the Republic of Albania. In it the Bosniaks were declared a national minority. According to the law, Bosniaks have the right to learn their own language (Bosnian) as part of the regular curriculum. In addition, Bosniaks in Albania now have the right to indicate their ethnicity in censuses.

== Notable people ==
- Ajshe Stari - film actress during the communist era

== See also ==
- Bosniaks
- Demographics of Albania
- Bulgarians in Albania
- Macedonians in Albania
- Serbo-Montenegrins in Albania
