= Argyro Pigadi =

Argyro Pigadi Αργυρό Πηγάδι
- Community
- Location within Greece
- Coordinates: 38°41′25″N 21°41′58″E
- Country: Greece
- Administrative region: Western Greece
- Regional unit: Aetolia-Acarnania
- Municipality: Thermo

Population (2021)
  - Community: 84
- Time zone: UTC+2 (EET)
  - Summer (DST): UTC+3 (EEST)

Argyro Pigadi (Greek: Αργυρό Πηγάδι, before 1928: Γκερτοβός - Gertovos) is a village in the municipality of Thermo, western Greece, in the region of Oreini Trichonida. The village is located near the second highest peak of the Panaitoliko mountain range, Triantafyllia. Nearby villages include Amvrakia, Nerochori, Kokkinovrysi, and Kastania. The name Argyro Pigadi means Silver Well, a reference to the abundance of water in the region.

== Agios Georgios ==
The post-Byzantine church of Agios Georgios is located within the village boundaries. The church is dedicated to a saint, Agios Georgios Neomartyras, who lived in Ioannina during the mid-19th century. The church was consecrated in 1847 and has been maintained largely through the efforts of village residents.

== Village association ==
Although the population of the village has declined significantly in the last 30 years, as people relocated to urban centers, an association of people with roots in Argyro Pigadi was established in 1971. The association edits a newspaper, To Gramma Mas, which is distributed four times a year to members and also holds annual meetings during which time members discuss village maintenance and establish priorities for the upcoming year. The association is also responsible for the organization of the annual Panegyri celebration held in the village in August and three winter celebrations held in Agrinio, Athens, and Kiato.
