= Levan, Fier =

Levan
- Administrative unit
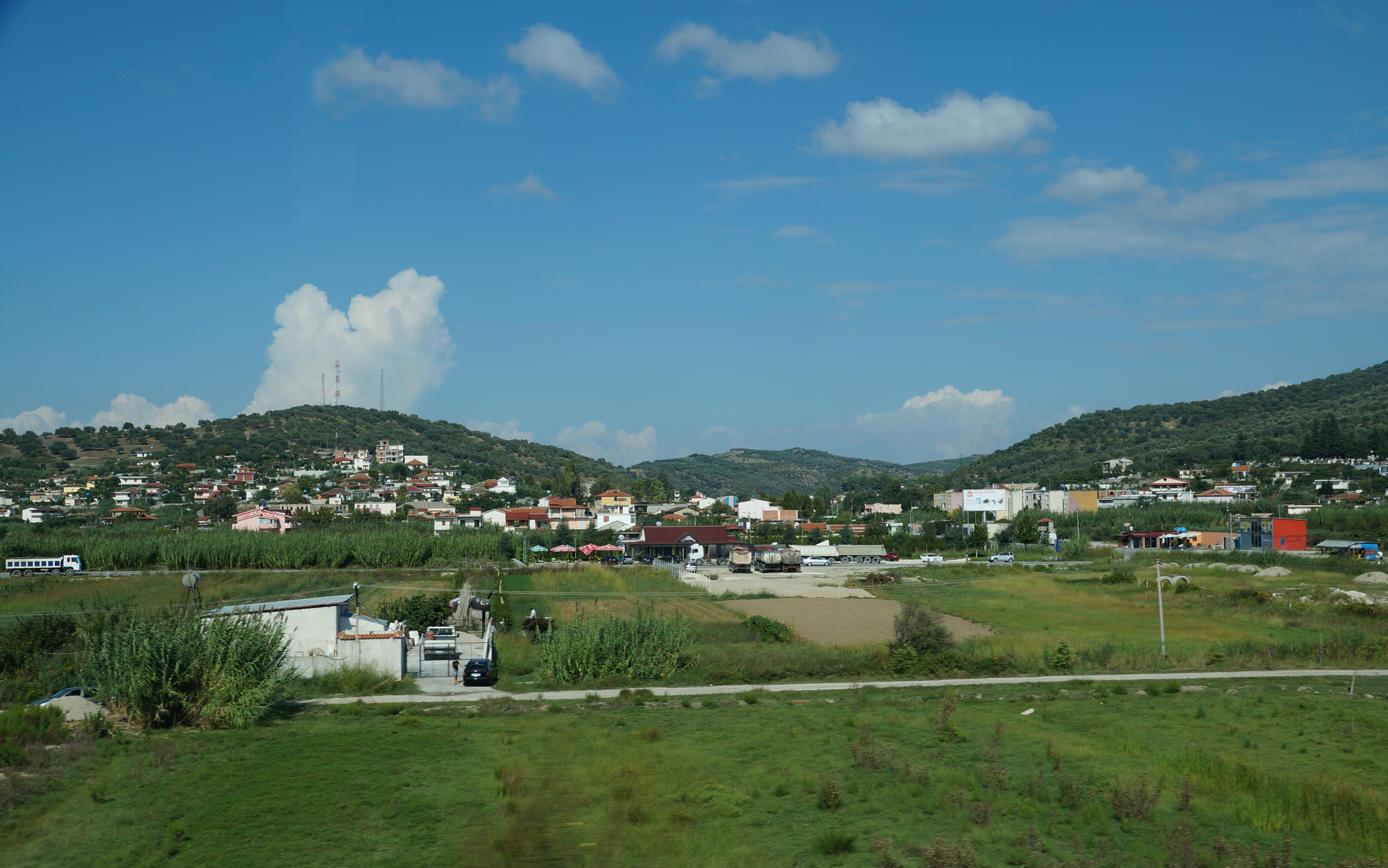
- Levan viewed from the south-west

- Location within Albania
- Coordinates: 40°41′N 19°29′E
- Country: Albania
- County: Fier
- Municipality: Fier

Population (2011)
  - Administrative unit: 8,159
- Time zone: UTC+1 (CET)
  - Summer (DST): UTC+2 (CEST)

Levan is a village and a former municipality in the Fier County, southwestern Albania. At the 2015 local government reform it became a subdivision of the municipality Fier. The population at the 2011 census was 8,159.

== See also ==
- Gang of Pusi i Mezinit (the Levan Massacre)
