= Seman (river) =

River in western Albania

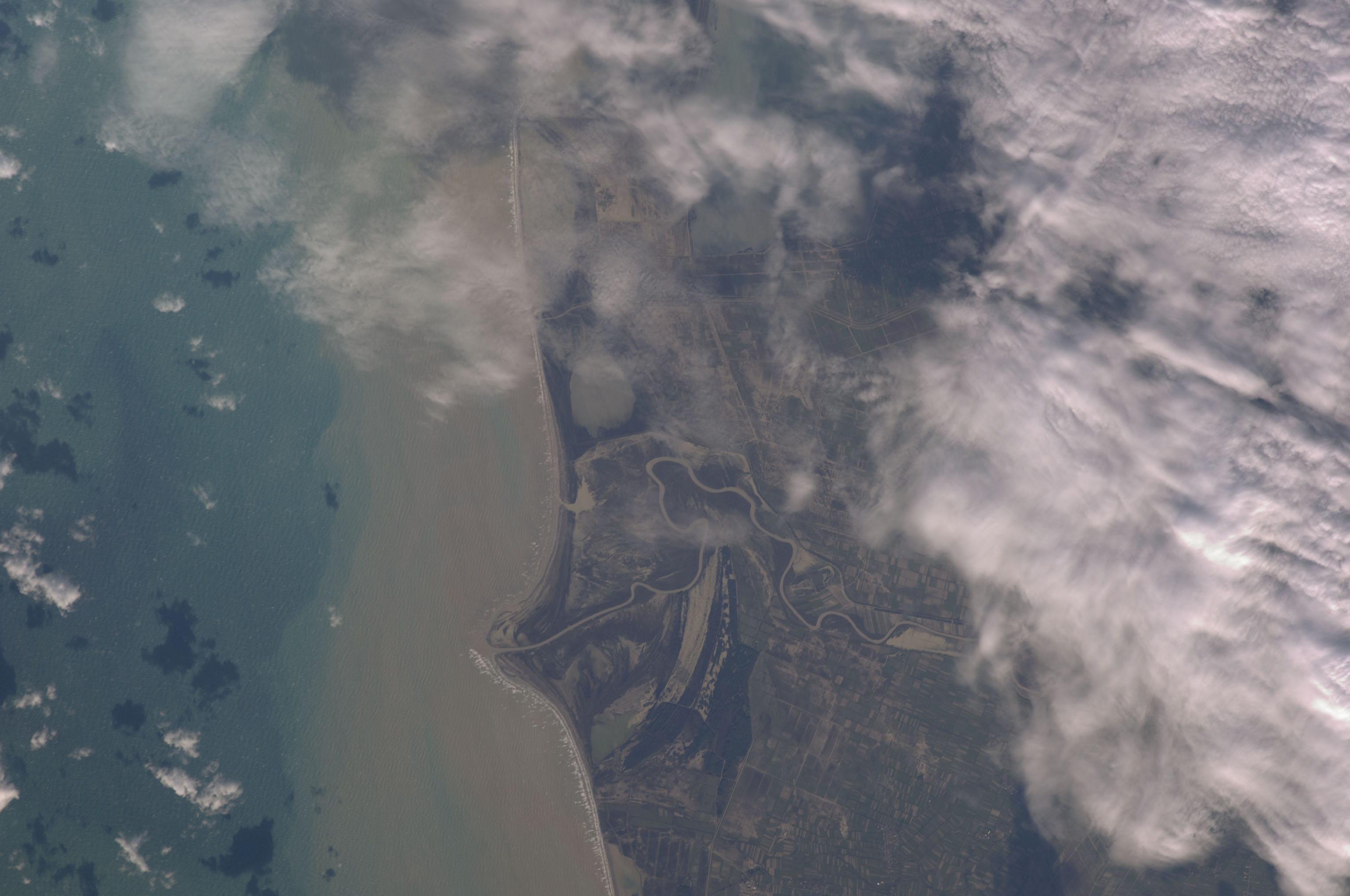
- Aerial view of Seman discharging into the Adriatic

Location
- Country: Albania

Physical characteristics
- Source
  - location: Osum and Devoll
- Mouth
  - location: Adriatic Sea
  - coordinates: 40°49′25″N 19°22′0″E
- Length: 85 km (53 mi)
- Basin size: 5,649 km^{2} (2,181 sq mi)
- Discharge
  - average: 95.7 m^{3}/s (3,380 cu ft/s)

The Seman is a major river in western Albania. It is formed by the confluence of the rivers Devoll and Osum, a few km west of Kuçovë. It is 85 km (53 mi) long (281 km (175 mi) with its longest source river Devoll) and its drainage basin is 5,649 km^{2} (2,181 sq mi). Its average discharge is 95.7 m^{3}/s (3,380 cu ft/s). It meanders generally westwards through a flat lowland. Near Fier, the Seman receives the Gjanica from the left. It flows into the Adriatic Sea at the southern margin of the Divjakë-Karavasta National Park.

== Etymology ==
In classical antiquity, the Seman River was known as the Apsus, which is a derivative of the Indo-European root *ăp- "water, river". The Illyrian hydronym Apsus, corresponds to Apsias, a river name in southern Italy brought by Illyrian migrations (Iapygians) in the region.
