= Roskovec =

- Municipality
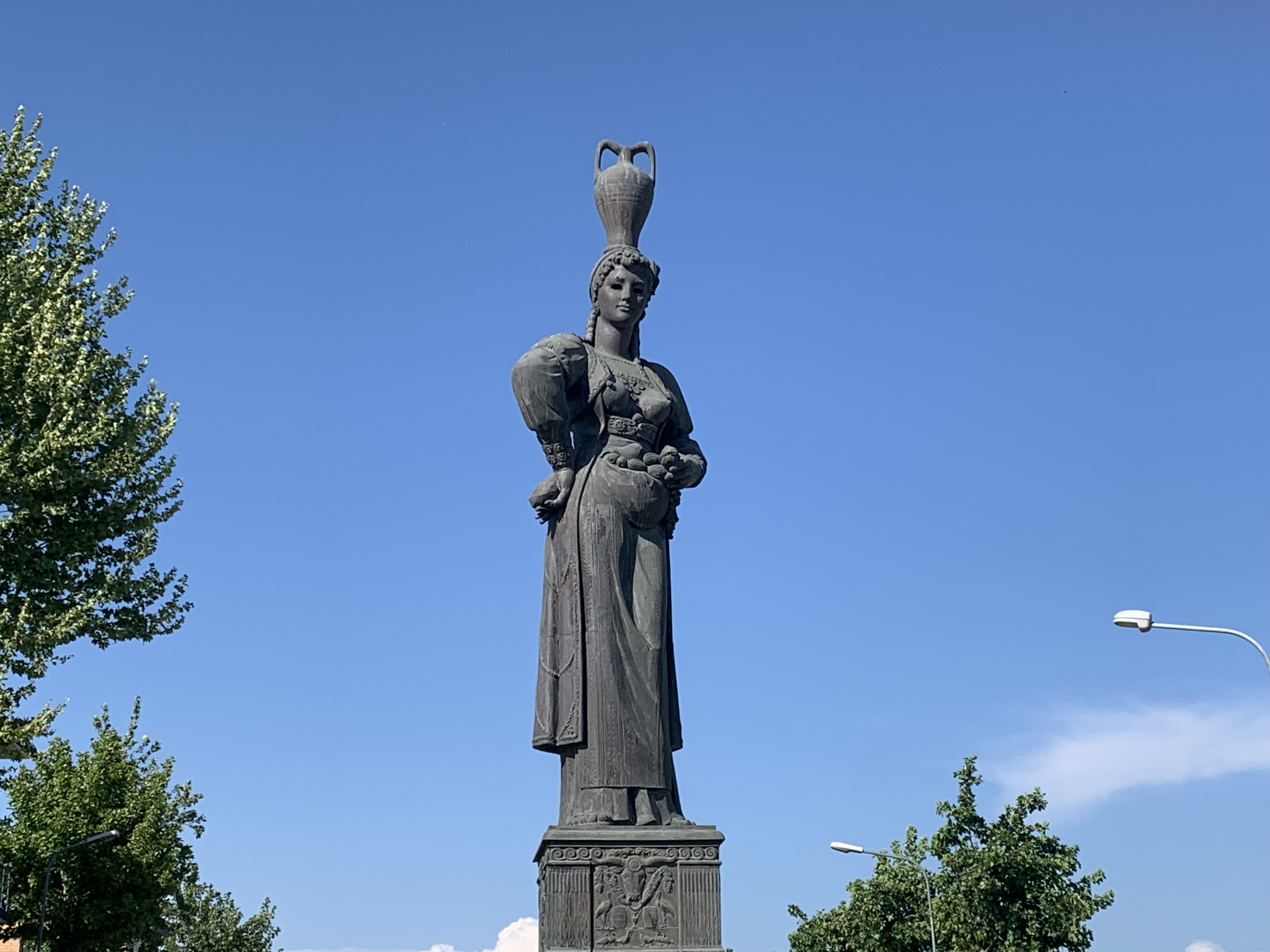

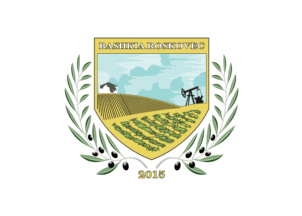
- Flag Emblem

- Location within Albania
- Coordinates: 40°44′N 19°42′E
- Country: Albania
- County: Fier

Government
  - Mayor: Majlinda Bufi (PS)

Area
  - Municipality: 118.08 km^{2} (45.59 sq mi)
- Elevation: 23 m (75 ft)

Population (2023)
  - Municipality: 16,332
  - Municipality density: 138.31/km^{2} (358.23/sq mi)
  - Administrative unit: 4,078
- Time zone: UTC+1 (CET)
  - Summer (DST): UTC+2 (CEST)
- Postal Code: 9306
- Area Code: (0)382
- Website: bashkiaroskovec.gov.al

Roskovec (Albanian definite form: Roskoveci) is a town and a municipality in Fier County, south-central Albania. The municipality was formed at the 2015 local government reform by the merger of the former municipalities Kuman, Kurjan, Roskovec and Strum, that became municipal units. The seat of the municipality is the town of Roskovec. The total population is 16,332 (2023 census), in a total area of 118.08 km^{2}. The population of the former municipality at the 2023 census was 4,078.

== Notable people ==
- Roela Pasku, 3 times Chess National Champion
