= Lepavina Monastery =

Serbian Orthodox monastery near Koprivnica, Croatia

Coordinates: 46°05′28″N 16°40′39″E

Lepavina
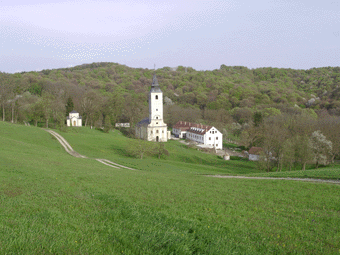
- Monastery church of the Presentation of the Theotokos with the chapel of Saint Tikhon of Zadonsk (left) and dormitory (right)
- Interactive map of Lepavina

Monastery information
- Order: Serbian Orthodox
- Established: 1550
- Dedication: Presentation of the Theotokos

Site
- Location: Lepavina, near Koprivnica, Croatia
- Public access: Yes

The Lepavina Monastery (Serbian: Манастир Лепавина; Croatian: Manastir Lepavina) is a Serbian Orthodox monastery dedicated to the Presentation of the Theotokos and located at the village of Sokolovac, near the town of Koprivnica in Croatia.

== History ==
According to an old local chronicle, the Lepavina monastery was founded around 1550, very soon after the emergence of the first Serbian settlements in this region. A monk from the Hilandar Monastery (on the Athos peninsula, Greece), Jefrem (Ephraim) Vukodabović, born in Herzegovina, together with two monks from Bosnia, built a wooden church here. They were soon joined by several other monks and the institution, according to the chronicle, acquired the status of a monastery.

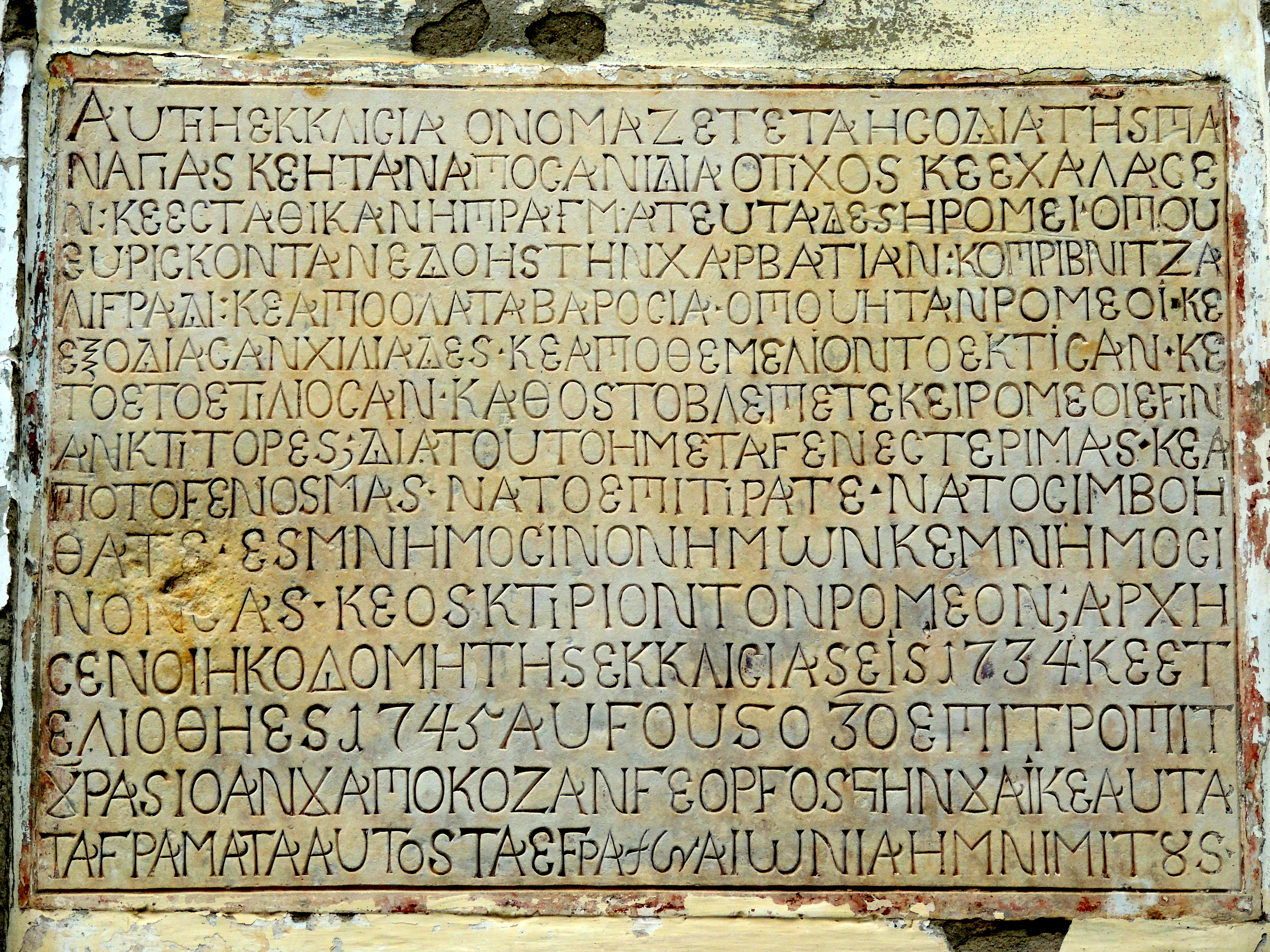
Greek inscription as requested by the founders of the monastery in 1734 (the building is designated as "ktirion ton Romeon" i.m. building of the Orthodox Romans)

In 1557, Ottomans and the Islamized inhabitants of Stupčanica, Pakrac and Bijela, under the leadership of Zarep-Agha Ali, burnt down the church and the monastic buildings, four monks were killed and two taken to slavery.

In 1598 Hieromonk Gregory, also from the Hilandar Monastery, came to Lepavina with two monks from the Mileševa Monastery, and they re-established the monastic community and rebuilt the edifices. In 1630, the ethnic Serb population of this region, due to their constant involvement in the fights against the Ottomans and their allies, received great privileges, which created the conditions for building activity on a larger scale.

As Serb settlements by name and signature Mali i Veliki Poganac were mentioned in 1610 as well as Lepavina(Lipavina) and Marča Monastery.

Archimandrite Visarion came to Lepavina in 1635 to become the head of the community, and under his auspices in 1636-1642 a larger monastery complex developed.

In 1642, Count Johannes Galler confirmed the rights of the monastery to all the possessions donated by the dwellers of Branjska and Sesvečani. The same was done in charters by Baron Sigmund von Eibiswald, Voivode Gvozden with Đorđe Dobrojević, Blaže Pejašinović and Voivode Radovan (1644), Baron Honorius von Trauttmansdorff (1644) and Count Georg Ludwig von Schwarzenberg (1644).

History of the Lepavina Monastery is inseparable from history of the Serbs in the Varaždin Generalat, who identified with Orthodoxy and mostly defied the union with the Roman Catholic Church. The monks took part in the conflicts of the local population against the social injustice: in 1666 they suffered in the great uprising led by the Križevci judge Osmokruhović, and in 1672, together with the monks of the Gomirje Monastery (14 men in total), they were sentenced to galley slavery and sent to Malta. On 24 November 1715 (13 November according to the Julian style) Hegumen (Abbot) Kodrat (Quadratus) was shot dead at the threshold of the monastery church, which was a consequence of conflicts with neighbouring Uniate (Greek Catholic) clergy.

At the end of 1692 and the beginning of 1693, Lepavina hosted Serbian Patriarch of Peć, Arsenije III Čarnojević (or Crnojević). He was gathering the local Serbs and preaching, and also visiting the local voivodes of Krajina, which enhanced the reputation of the abbey. After the Eastern Orthodox Monastery of Marča was handed over to the Greek Catholics, Lepavina became the major centre of Eastern Orthodoxy in the region.

In 1734, the ethnic Serb population of the Varaždin Generalat succeeded in obtaining the permission to have their own Eastern Orthodox bishop – the Greek Catholic bishop received as his headquarters the recently seized Marča Monastery, while Lepavina was assigned as the residence of the new Orthodox bishop. However, because of Lepavina’s peripheral position, the final seat of the Orthodox bishopric became Severin, while the diocese was called the Eparchy of Lepavina and Severin. The first bishop of Lepavina and Severin, Simeon Filipović was buried in Lepavina – he died in the investigative custody in Koprivnica, which was yet another consequence of gradual imposition of the church Union on the local Orthodox.

Although life under Empress Maria Theresa was not easy for the Orthodox – for a short time Orthodoxy was even declared illicit, and the Lepavina Monastery should have become Greek Catholic – the still-standing monastery church was built in the mid-18th century. The project was realised under the guidance of Nikola Popović, the former ‘protopresbyter of Croatia’ and parish priest of Pisanica, where he also had built a nice church. Nikola took the vows and became the archimandrite of Lepavina with the name Nikifor (Nicephorus). In, 1753 the completed Baroque church was consecrated by Arsenije (Arsenius, Teofanović) the Bishop of Kostajnica and Zrinopolje, who resided mainly in Severin.

The World War II was especially difficult period. Immediately after the occupation, the brethren were arrested and taken to a concentration camp. Hieromonk Joakim Babić was killed and the others were deported to Serbia. In 1943, the monastery was bombarded, monastic buildings were almost completely destroyed, while the church and the dormitory were heavily damaged. Nevertheless, in the part of the dormitory that escaped destruction, the part of the monastery library remained intact and was appropriated by the Greek Catholic clergy.

After the war, the only inhabitant of the monastery was Father Simeon Sakulj, who partially renovated it and returned the usurped property. By the efforts of Metropolitan Jovan Pavlović of Zagreb and Ljubljana, who became the head of the diocese in 1977, the monastery regained the old glory and importance. The connection with the Hilandar Monastery was revived in 1984, when monk Gavrilo Vučković came from there and became Lepavina’s hegumen and finally archimandrite.

The monastery was renovated with the help of the World Council of Churches, the Evangelisches Jugendwerk from Württemberg and the members of the Evangelical (Lutheran) Church from Stuttgart.

Thanks to the ardent work of Father Gavrilo Vučković, the spiritual life is on the rise: there are several brethren and novices, the journal Put, Istina i Život (‘The Way, the Truth, and the Life’) is published, and the monastery is an extremely popular destination for pilgrims, not only from Croatia, but from the whole Europe, and even from the other continents. It is visited by streams of Eastern Orthodox and Roman Catholic believers, as well as by those who are looking for the answers to some spiritual questions or help in adversities. Lepavina serves as a bridge in the new dialogue of love between the Eastern and Western Churches, the old dissensions are being forgotten and the new atmosphere of mutual understanding and true deeper rapprochement is being created.

== Treasures ==
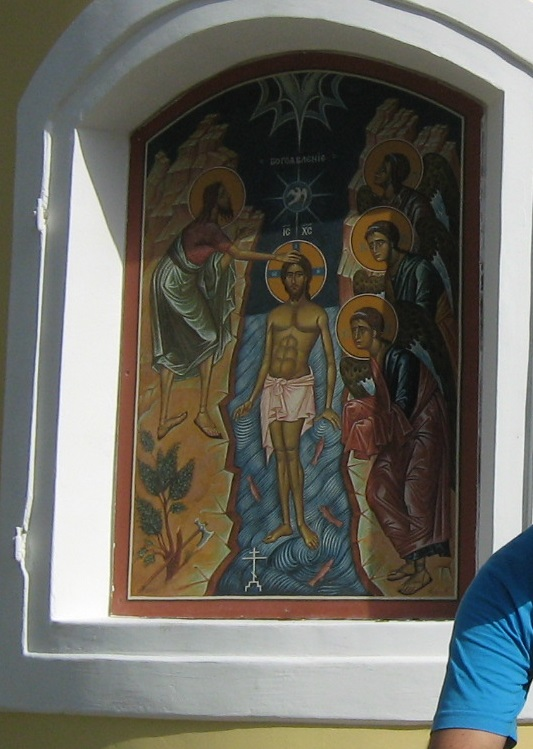
Depiction of the baptism of Jesus

The monastery is proud of its wonder-working icon of the Mother of God that makes it such an important pilgrimage site. It is painted in the Creto-Venetian style from the beginning of the 16th century. It is not known how it came to the monastery, but the local tradition asserts it was here when the monastic community was in its infancy.

One of the features of interest was the iconostasis from 1775, a work by one of the best representatives of the Serbian early Baroque, Jovan Četirević Grabovan, destroyed during World War II, with only three pictures remaining. Besides these, the monastery keeps the icons of St Simeon Nemanja, St Sava and the icon of the Entry into the Temple of the Most Holy Mother of God (i.e. the Presentation of the Blessed Virgin Mary), all painted in Lepavina in 1647.

Especially valuable are the manuscripts and old printed books. Among the oldest are the two Tetraevangelia from the 13th and 14th centuries, one of the Serbian-Raška and the other of the Macedonian recensions, both with exquisite initials. As Lepavina served as an elementary school for attaining literacy and other skills, a lot of written material and copied books were deposited here.

== See also ==
- List of Serbian Orthodox monasteries

== Sources and further reading ==
On the Monastery

- Čuda presvete Bogorodice Lepavinske (The Miracles of the Icon of Theotokos of Lepavina). Ed. V. Srbljan. Sokolovac: Manastir Lepavina, 2000.
- Gavrilović, S. Iz istorije Srba u Hrvatskoj, Slavoniji i Ugarskoj: XV-XIX vek (From the History of the Serbs in Croatia, Slavonia and Hungary: 15th-18th Centuries). Belgrade: Filip Višnjić, 1993.
- Kašić, D. Srpski manastiri u Hrvatskoj i Slavoniji (Serbian Monasteries in Croatia and Slavonia). Belgrade: Srpska patrijaršija, 1971.
- Krasić, V. Manastir Lepavina: prilog k srpskoj istoriji (The Monastery of Lepavina: A Contribution to the Serbian History). Novi Sad: Srpska štamparija dra Svetozara Miletića, 1889.

On the Art of the Monastery

- Jovanović, M. “Jovan Četirević Grabovan,” Zbornik za likovne umetnosti 1 (1965), 199-222.
- Mileusnić, S. “Slikar Ostoja Mrkojević i njegova ikonopisačka dela” (Painter Ostoja Mrkojević and His Iconographic Works), Zbornik za likovne umetnosti 21 (1985), 353-368.
- Mileusnić, S. “Vizantina u crkvenom slikarstvu Slavonije” (Byzantine Legacy in the Church Painting of Slavonia), Zbornik Matice srpske za likovne umetnosti 34/35 (2003), 19-29.

On the History of the Orthodox Church and Serbs in Croatia

- Gavrilović, S. Srbi u Ugarskoj, Slavoniji i Hrvatskoj, u borbama protiv Turaka od XV do XVIII veka (The Serbs in Hungary, Slavonia and Croatia in the Fighting Against the Turks from the 15th to the 18th Century). Belgrade: Nova, SANU, Balkanološki institut, 1993.
- Gavrilović, S. “Unijaćenje Srba u Hrvatskoj, Slavoniji i Baranji (XVI-XVIII vek),” (Converting the Serbs in Croatia, Slavonia and Baranja to Roman Catholicism: 16th-18th centuries), Srpski narod van granica današnje SR Jugoslavije od kraja XV veka do 1914. godine. Ed. Dragutin Ranković. Belgrade: Zavod za udžbenike i nastavna sredstva, 1996, 37-47.
- Grujić, R. M. Marčanska unija i unija u Žumberku (The Church Unions of Marča and Žumberak). Sremski Karlovci: Patrijaršiska štamparija, 1938.
- Grujić, R. M. Propast manastira Marče – po arhivskim podacima (The Downfall of the Marča Monastery – According to the Archival Materials). Zagreb: Štampa Srpske štamparije, 1908.
- Kaser, K. Freier Bauer und Soldat: Die Militarisierung der agrarischen Gesellschaft an der kroatisch-slawonischen Militärgrenze (1535-1881) (A Yeoman and a Soldier: The Militarization of the Agrarian Society in the Croatian-Slavonian Military Frontier, 1535-1881). Vienna: Böhlau, 1997.
- Kašić, D. Otpor Marčanskoj uniji: Lepavinsko-severinska eparhija (The Resistance to the Church Union of Marča: The Diocese of Lepavina-Severin). Belgrade: Pravoslavlje, 1986.
- Kašić, D. Srbi i pravoslavlje u Slavoniji i sjevernoj Hrvatskoj (Serbs and Orthodoxy in Slavonia and Northern Croatia). Zagreb: Savez udruženja pravoslavnog sveštenstva SR Hrvatske, 1967.
- Kašić, D. Srpska naselja i crkve u sjevernoj Hrvatskoj i Slavoniji (Serbian Settlements and Churches in Northern Croatia and Slavonia). Zagreb: Eparhijski upravni odbor, 2004.
- Pribićević, A. Naseljavanje Srba po Hrvatskoj i Dalmaciji (Settlement of the Serbs in Croatia and Dalmatia). Zagreb: Zajednica Srba u Hrvatskoj, 2000.
- Roksandić, D. Srbi u Hrvatskoj: od 15. stoljeća do naših dana (Serbs in Croatia from the 15th Century to Our Time). Zagreb: Vjesnik, 1991.
- Schwicker, J. H. “Zur Geschichte der kirchlichen Union in der Croatischen Militärgrenze. Eine geschichtliche Studie nach den Acten des Archives der ehemaligen königlich ungarischen Hofkanzlei” (On the History of the Church Union in the Croatian Military Frontier. A Historical Study According to the Archival Records of the Former Royal Hungarian Court Chancellery), Archiv für österreichische Geschichte 52 (1874), 275-400.
- Zbornik o Srbima u Hrvatskoj (Collected Papers on the Serbs in Croatia). 4 vols. Ed. V. Krestić. Belgrade: Srpska akademija nauka i umetnosti, 1989, 1991, 1995, 1999.
- Zbornik radova o povijesti i kulturi srpskog naroda u Socijalističkoj Republici Hrvatskoj (Collected Papers on the History and Culture of the Serbian People in the Socialist Republic of Croatia). Zagreb: JAZU, Zavod za povijesne znanosti. 1988.
