= Strum, Albania =

Strum
- Administrative unit
- Location within Albania
- Coordinates: 40°45′05″N 19°44′20″E
- Country: Albania
- County: Fier
- Municipality: Roskovec

Population (2011)
  - Administrative unit: 7,538
- Time zone: UTC+1 (CET)
  - Summer (DST): UTC+2 (CEST)

Strum is a village and a former municipality in the Fier County, southwestern Albania. At the 2015 local government reform it became a subdivision of the municipality Roskovec. The population at the 2011 census was 7,538.
