= Libofshë =

- Administrative unit
- Location within Albania
- Coordinates: 40°50′N 19°33′E
- Country: Albania
- County: Fier
- Municipality: Fier

Population (2011)
  - Administrative unit: 6,149
- Time zone: UTC+1 (CET)
  - Summer (DST): UTC+2 (CEST)

Libofshë is a village and a former municipality in the Fier County, southwestern Albania. At the 2015 local government reform it became a subdivision of the municipality Fier. The population at the 2011 census was 6,149.

== Culture ==
The village is home to about 15 churches, the oldest being the Orthodox Church of Saint George, built in 1776. Bosniaks from settlements in Shijak and Durrës in 1924 went and settled in the village of Libofshë where they have mostly become linguistically integrated.
