= Fier =

Seventh largest city of Albania

Fier Fieri
- Municipality
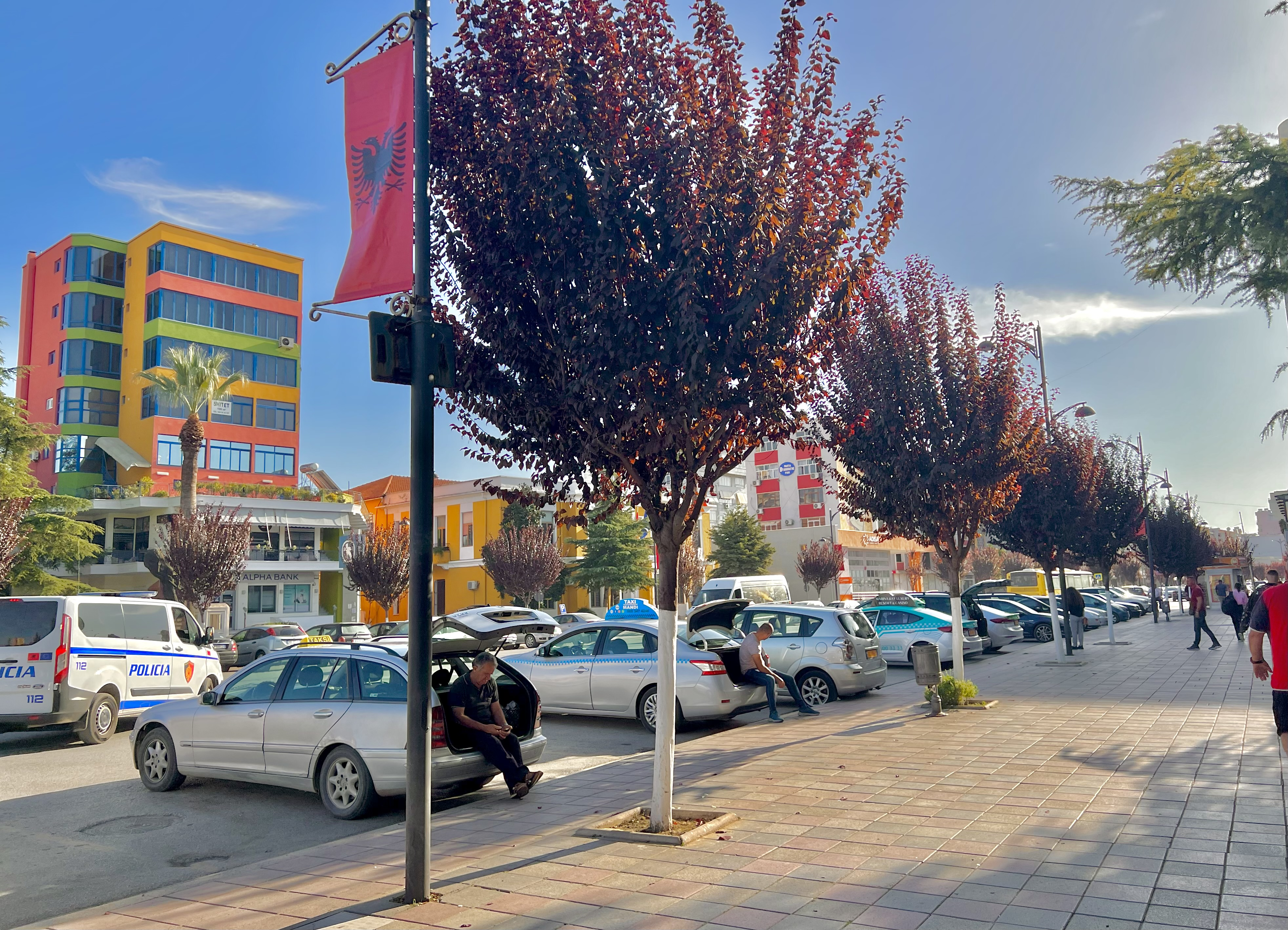
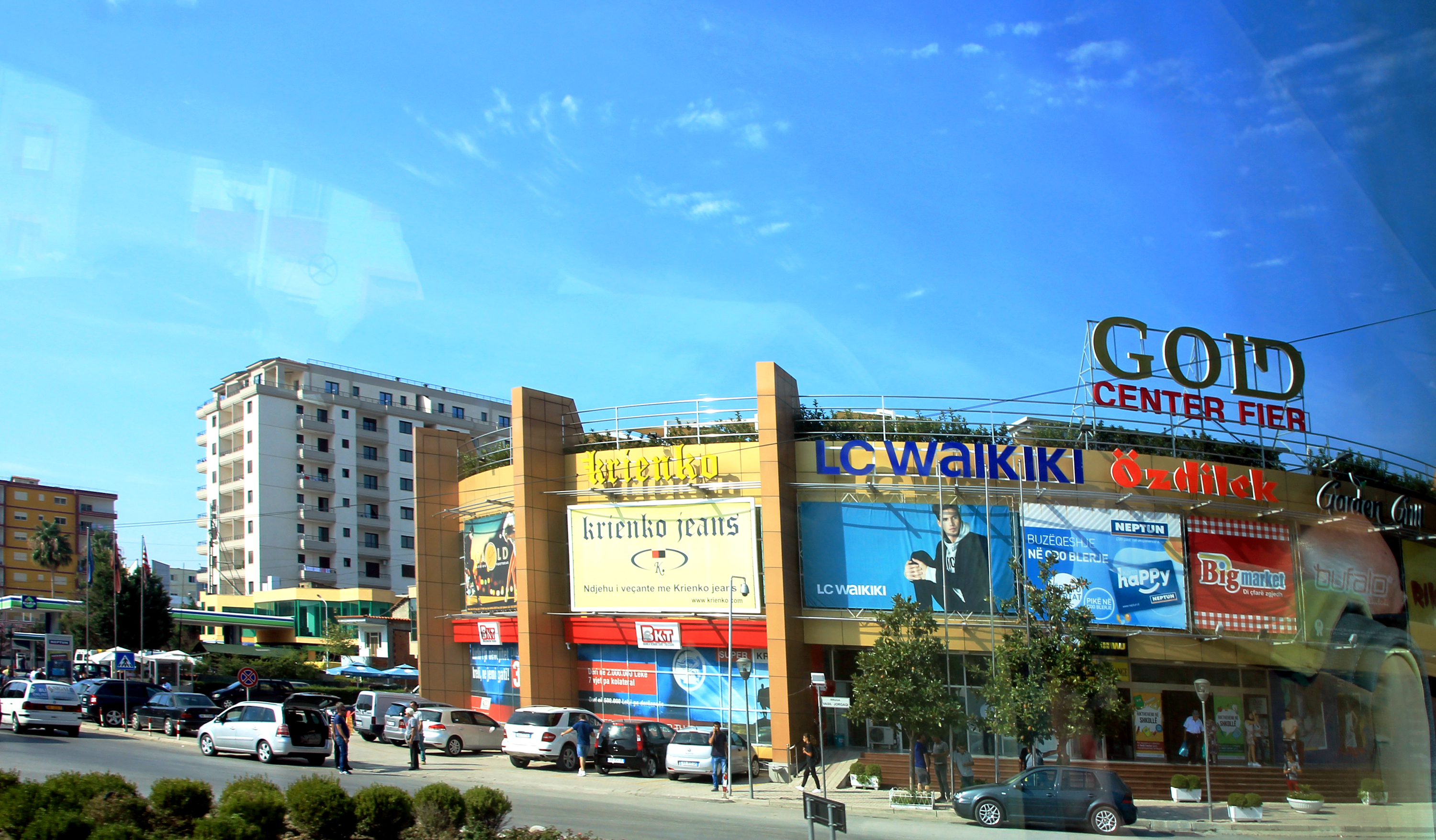
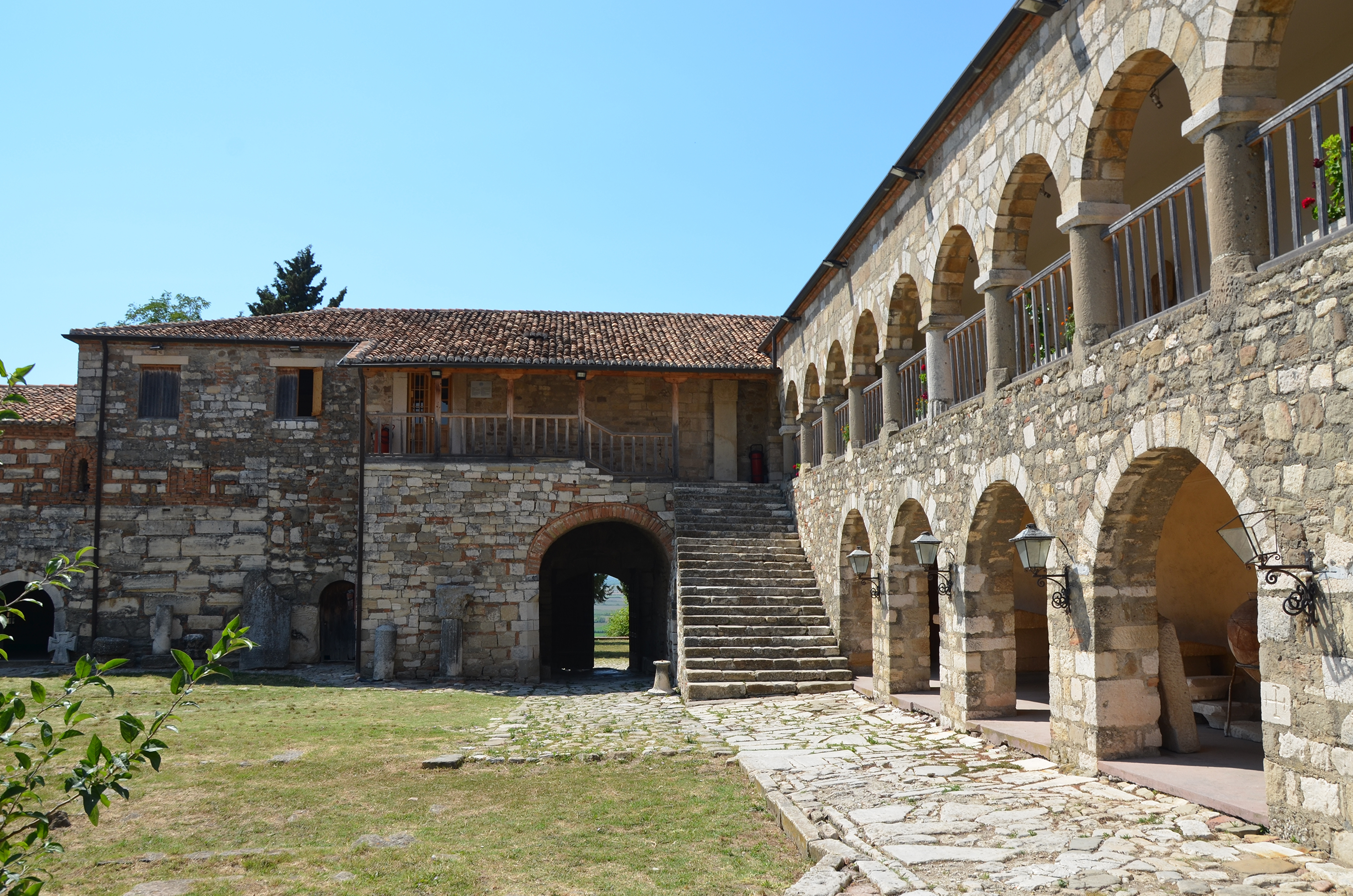
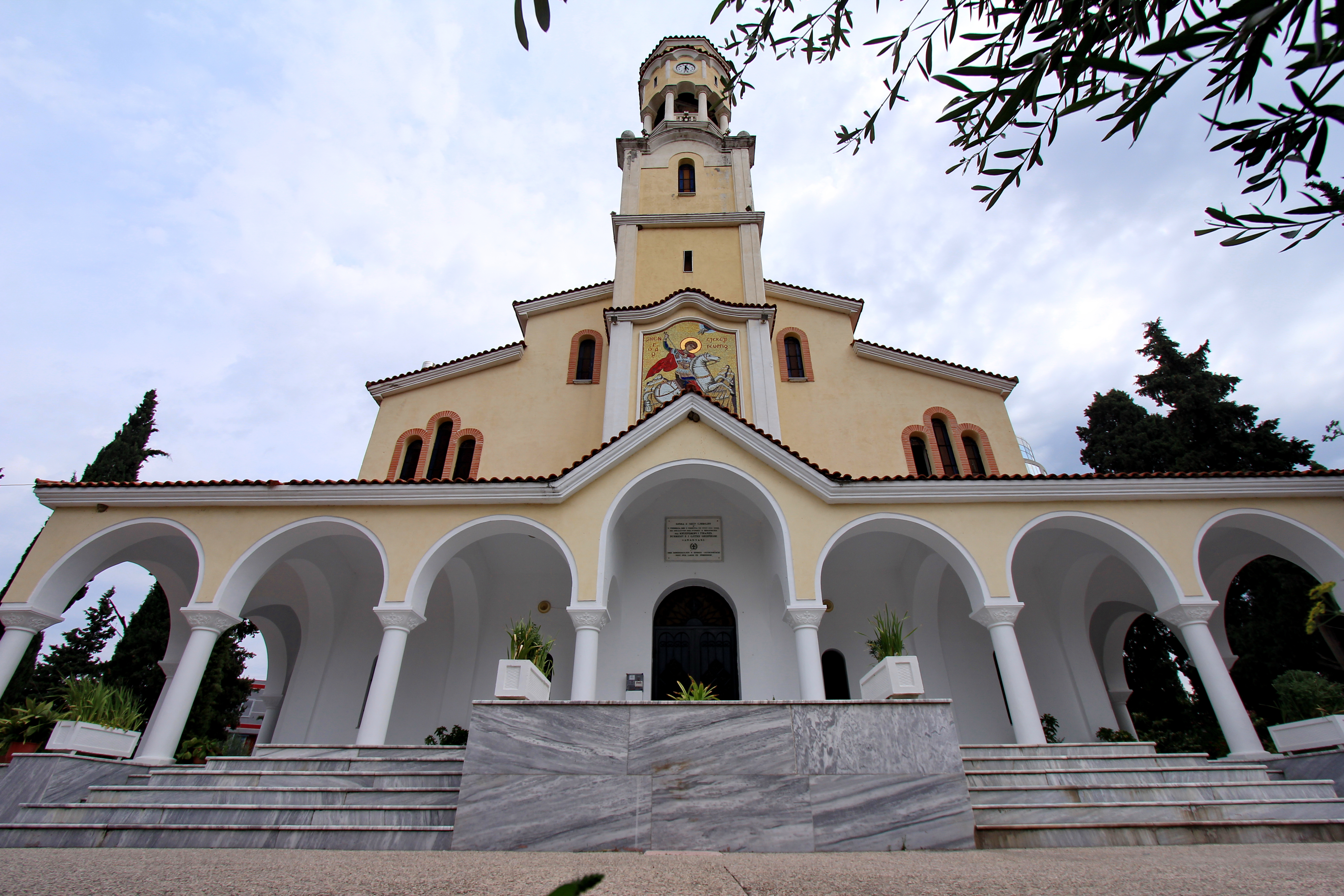
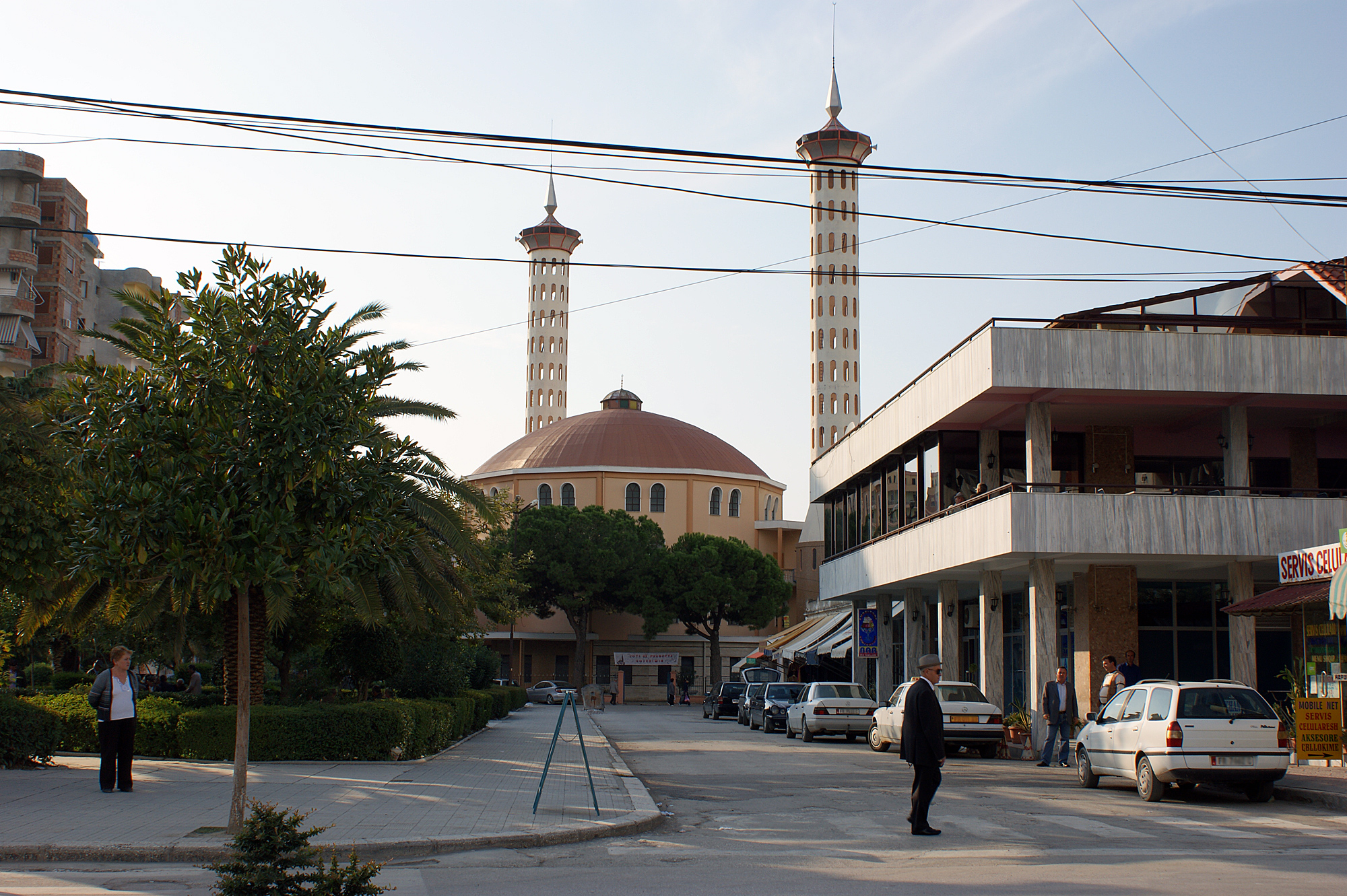
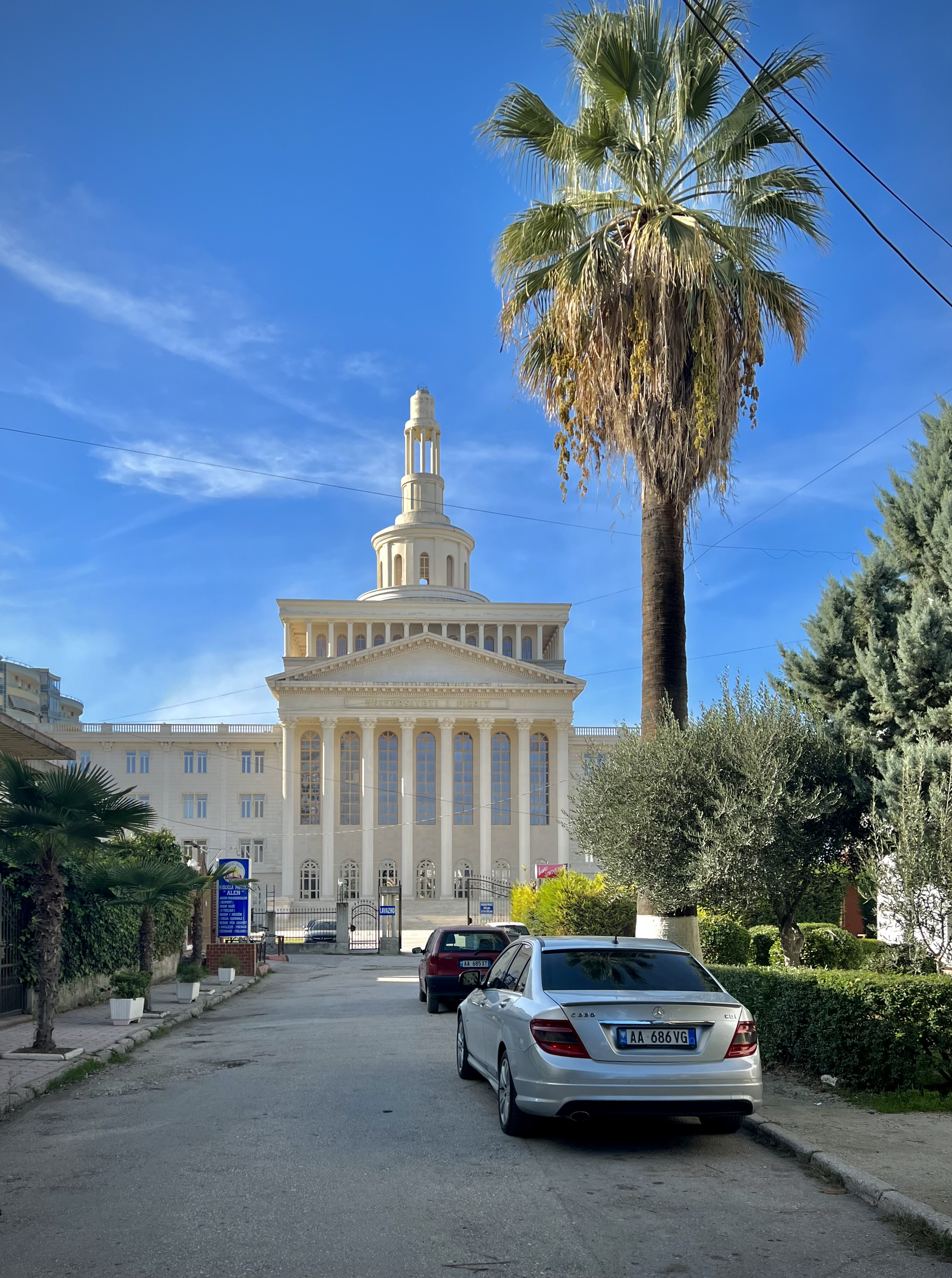
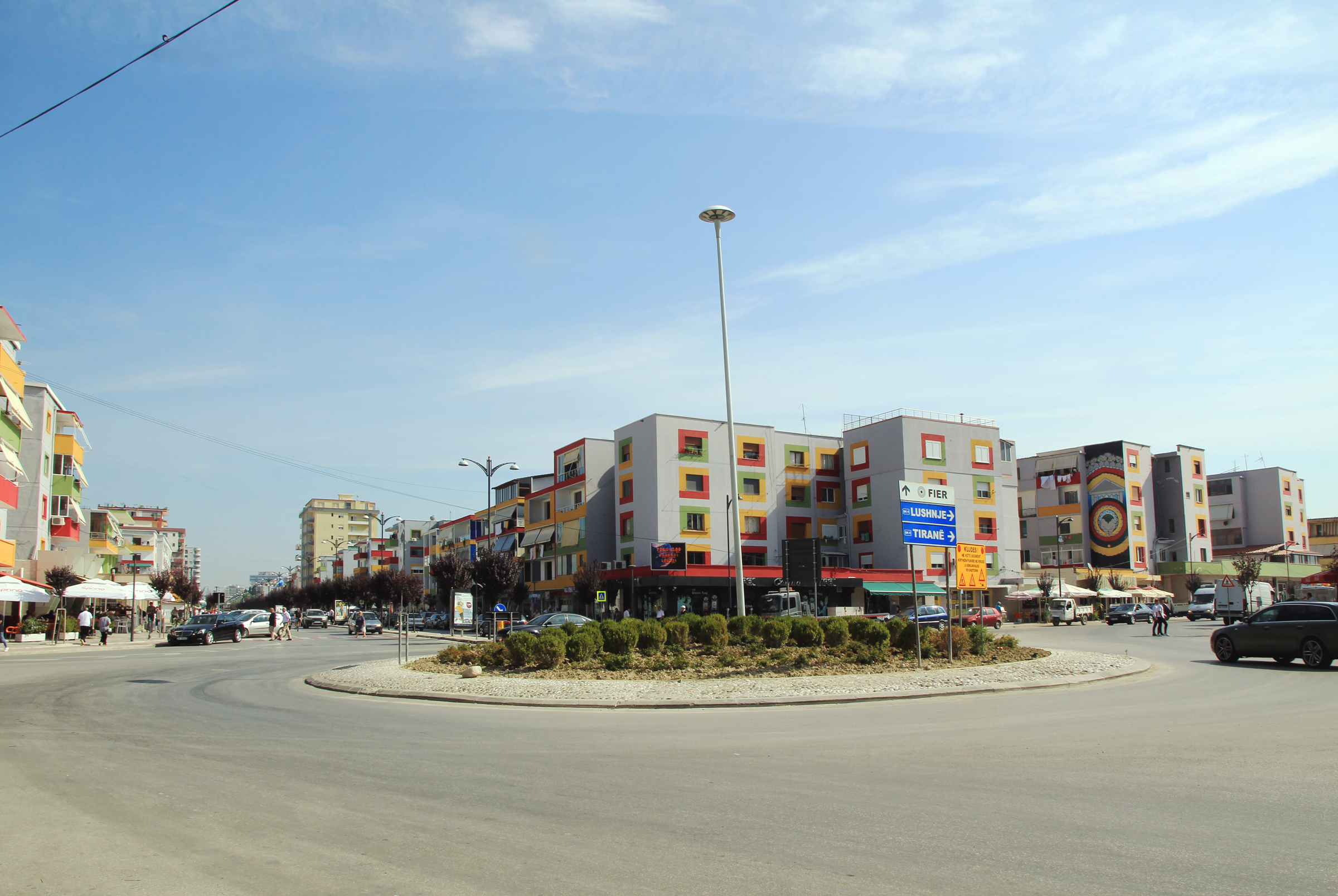
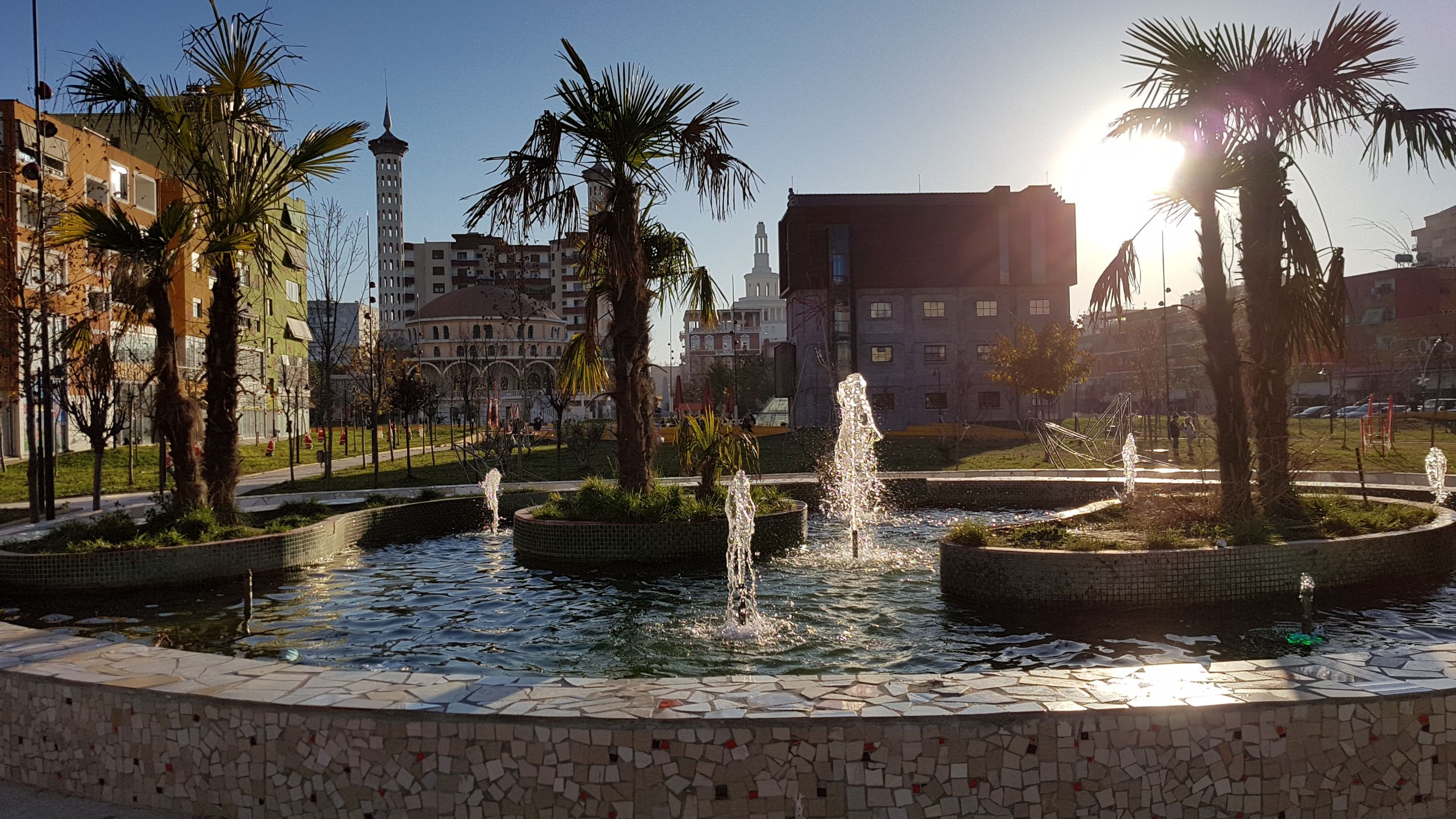
- Top to bottom, left to right: Centre of Fier, Gold Market Shopping centre, Archaeological Museum of Apolonia, Shën Gjergj Cathedral and Mosque of Fier, University of Fier, Apartment buildings in Fier, Fountain in Fier

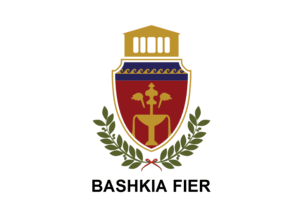
- Flag Emblem

- Location within Albania
- Coordinates: 40°43′30″N 19°33′26″E
- Country: Albania
- County: Fier
- Incorporated: 1869

Government
  - Mayor: Armando Subashi (PS)

Area
  - Municipality: 628.8 km^{2} (242.8 sq mi)
  - Administrative unit: 6.96 km^{2} (2.69 sq mi)
- Elevation: 44 m (144 ft)

Population (2023)
  - Municipality: 101,963
  - Municipality density: 162.2/km^{2} (420.0/sq mi)
  - Administrative unit: 52,926
  - Administrative unit density: 7,600/km^{2} (19,700/sq mi)
- Demonym(s): Albanian: Fierak (m), Fierake (f)
- Time zone: UTC+1 (CET)
  - Summer (DST): UTC+2 (CEST)
- Postal Code: 9301-9305
- Area Code: 034
- Website: bashkiafier.gov.al

Fier (pronounced [fiˈɛɾ]; Albanian definite form: Fieri, Latin: Fierum) is the seventh most populous city of the Republic of Albania and seat of Fier County and Fier Municipality. It is situated on the bank of Gjanica River in the Myzeqe Plain between the Seman in the north, the Vjosë in the south and the foothills of the Mallakastra Mountains in the southeast. Fier experiences a seasonal Mediterranean climate affected by its proximity to the Adriatic Sea in the west.

Fier was founded in the 19th century by the Vrioni family and officially in 1864 by Omer Pasha Vrioni II, the father of Kahreman Pasha Vrioni (1889-1955). It is 7 km (4 mi) from the ruins of the ancient settlement of Apollonia which was founded in 588 BCE by Ancient Greek colonists from Corfu and Corinth, on a site occupied by Illyrian tribes.

Fier is an important terminus in southwestern Albania and is served by the A2 motorway and SH 4 highway, forming a north–south corridor in Albania and part of the Adriatic–Ionian motorway.

== Name ==
The word "Fier" is claimed to derive from the Albanian word fier, which is claimed to mean "fern". Naming locations after the local flora is a common phenomenon amongst the Myzeqar Albanians. Another alternative hypothesis proposes a derivation from the Italian word fiera, translated as trade fair.

== History ==
The history of Fier is bound up with that of the oil, gas and bitumen deposits nearby. The presence of asphalt and burning escapes of natural gas in the vicinity was recorded as early as the 1st century AD. Dioscorides, in Materia Medica, describes lumps of bitumen in the adjacent river Seman, and the concentrated pitch on the banks of the Vjosë river Strabo, writing in about AD 17 states:

On the territory of the people of Apolonia in Illyria there is what is called a nymphaeum. It is a rock which emits fire. Below it are springs flowing with hot water and asphalt... the asphalt is dug out of a neighbouring hill: the parts excavated are replaced by fresh earth, which in time is converted to asphalt.

In the 14th and 15th centuries the location was used by the Venetian traders as a marketplace to purchase agricultural products from the Myzeqe lowlands.

The settlement took city status in 1864 when Kahreman Pasha Vrioni, the local governor, asked from some French architects to project a future city as an artisan and trade centre. During the 1864–1865 period a market for 122 merchants was built along the Gjanica river. The first inhabitants of the city were the servants of Kahreman Pasha Vrioni and members of Aromanian families that had lived in the area since the early 19th century.

Six kilometres away from Fier is situated Apollonia, one of the two most important ancient Greek colonial settlements in present-day Albania. It was founded in ~600 BC on a hill near the sea, and near what was then the course of Vjosë river by Ancient Greek settlers from Corfu and Corinth. At the time before the changes in land formation and the Adriatic coastline caused by an earthquake in the 3rd century AD, the harbour af Apollonia could accommodate as many as 100 ships. The site was on the territory of Illyrian tribe of the Taulantii. The colony was said to have been named Gylaceia after its Corinthian founder, Gylax, and later changed its name to that of city of the God Apollo. According to archaeological investigations for 100 years Greek and Illyrian have lived in separate communities.

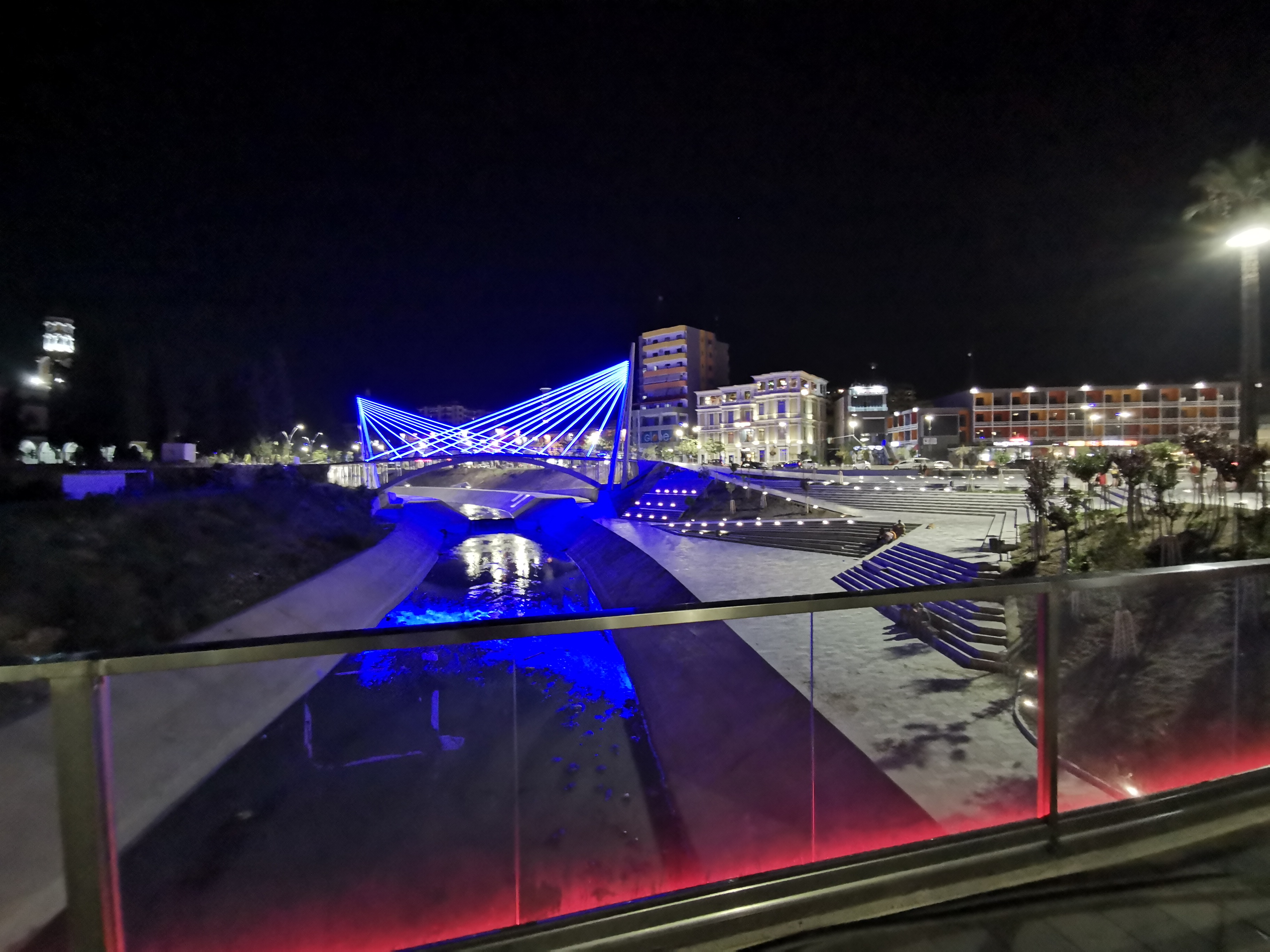
River Gjanica and Square of Victory

The economic prosperity of Apolonia grew on the basis of trade in slaves, and the local rich pastoral agricultural. In the middle of the 5th century BC, a workshop for minting coins was set up here. Through trade and commercial transactions these coins spread throughout Illyria and beyond its boundaries. In the years 214 BC onwards, the city was involved in the war between the Illyrian Taulantii and Cassander, the king of Macedonia, and in 229 BC came under Roman control. In 168 BC, its loyalty to Rome was rewarded. For 200 years, it was of central importance in the Roman effort to colonize the east and may have been an original terminus of the Egnatian Way. It was a vital stronghold for Caesar in the civil war between Pompey and Julius Caesar. In 45 and 44 BC, Octavian, later to become the Emperor Augustus, studied for 6 months in Apollonia, which had established a high reputation as a center of Greek learning, especially the art of rhetoric. It was noted by Cicero, in the Philippics, as 'magna urbs et gravis' a great and important city.

Under the Empire, Apollonia remained a prosperous centre, but began to decline as the Vjosë silted up and the coastline changed after the earthquake.

Europe's last public execution to date took place in Fier on 25 June 1992; Dritëbardh Çuko and Josif Çuko were hanged 27 days after committing the Libofshë massacre, a bungled robbery and revenge attack in which they murdered a family of five.

Since the fall of communism construction has been taking place. In particular, an Orthodox church was reconstructed in 1999 that allows people to practice their religion.

== Geography ==
Fier is located on the bank of Gjanica in the southeast of the Myzeqe Plain between the Seman in the north and Vjosë in the south of Fier near the Adriatic Sea in southwestern Albania. The municipality of Fier is encompassed in the County of Fier within the Southern Region of Albania and consists of the adjacent administrative units of Cakran, Dërmenas, Frakull, Levan, Libofshë, Mbrostar, Portëz, Qendër, Topojë and Fier as its seat. It stretches from the mouth of Seman within the Divjakë-Karavasta National Park in the northwest across the Albanian Adriatic Sea Coast until it reaches the mouth of Vjosë in the Vjosa-Narta Protected Landscape in the southwest, also forming the southern border of the municipality. The area of the municipality Fier is 619.9 km^{2}.

=== Climate ===
Fier has a Mediterranean climate (Csa) under the Köppen climate classification with mild winters and hot, dry summers.

Climate data for Climate data for Fier
Month	Jan	Feb	Mar	Apr	May	Jun	Jul	Aug	Sep	Oct	Nov	Dec	Year
Mean daily maximum °C (°F)	10.8 (51.4)	12 (54)	15.2 (59.4)	18.8 (65.8)	23.1 (73.6)	27.7 (81.9)	30.6 (87.1)	31.2 (88.2)	25.8 (78.4)	21.4 (70.5)	16.7 (62.1)	12 (54)	20.4 (68.9)
Mean daily minimum °C (°F)	3.1 (37.6)	3.7 (38.7)	5.9 (42.6)	9.1 (48.4)	13.3 (55.9)	17.6 (63.7)	20 (68)	20.4 (68.7)	16.8 (62.2)	12.9 (55.2)	9 (48)	4.8 (40.6)	11.4 (52.5)
Average precipitation mm (inches)	77 (3.0)	83 (3.3)	87 (3.4)	80 (3.1)	58 (2.3)	36 (1.4)	27 (1.1)	27 (1.1)	91 (3.6)	100 (3.9)	123 (4.8)	112 (4.4)	901 (35.4)
Average precipitation days	7	7	7	8	6	4	3	3	7	7	8	9	76
Average relative humidity (%)	76	73	71	70	69	64	60	60	69	74	75	77	70
Mean daily sunshine hours	6.8	7.6	8.9	10.2	11.5	12.4	12.6	11.8	10.1	8.5	7.4	6.7	9.5
Source: Climate-Data

== Economy ==
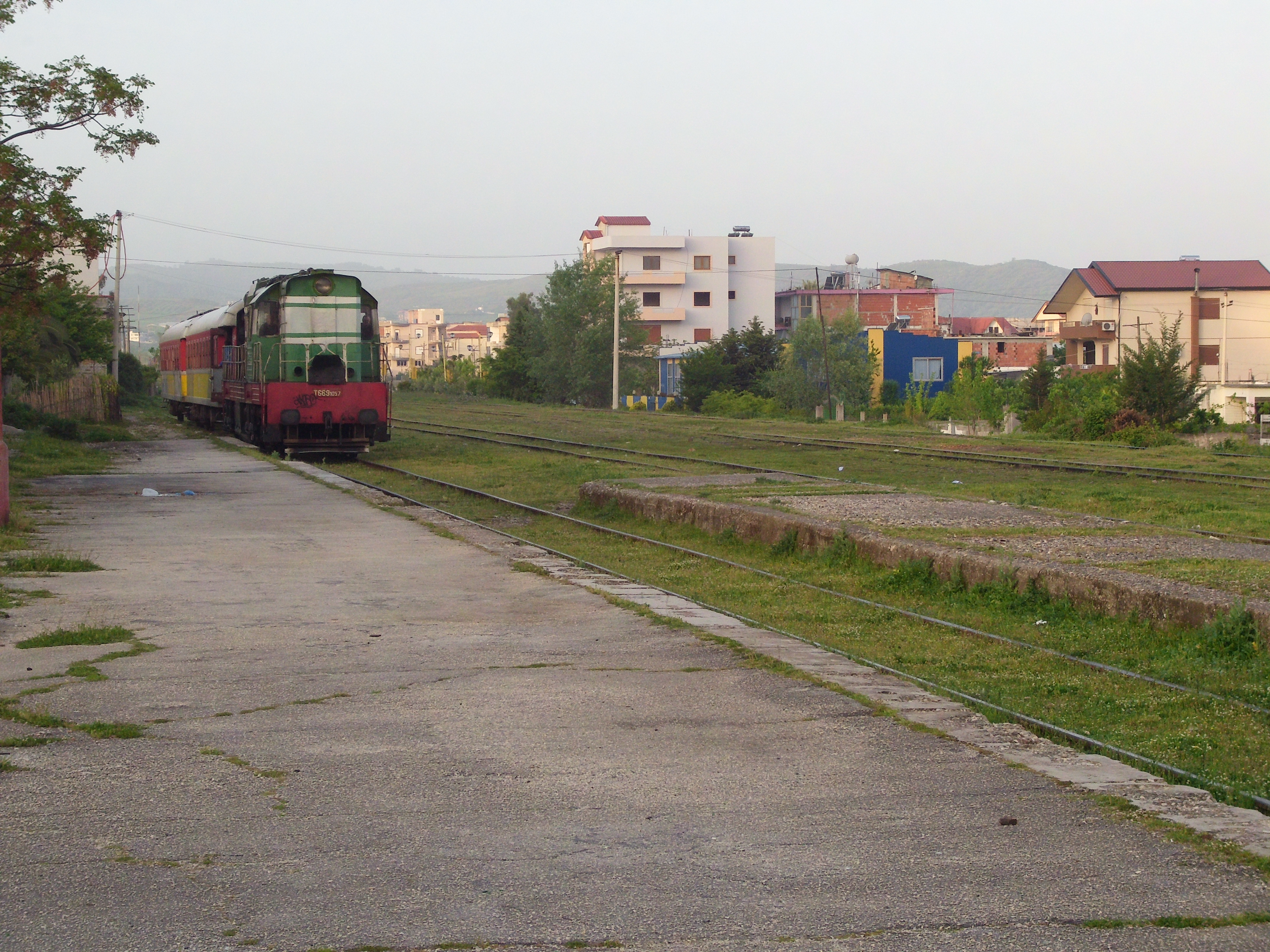
Train approaching Fier railway station.

Fier is an important industrial city and is built by the Gjanica tributary of the Seman River, and is surrounded by marshland. With nearby Patos town, it is the centre of the oil, bitumen and chemical industries in Albania. Fier additionally has been the home of power-generation in Albania with the construction of the Fier Power Plant during the communist era. Although it was decommissioned in 2007, a joint Greek-Albanian venture was announced in 2023 to revitalize these thermal plants to diversify Albania’s electrical industry.

Fier is a convenient place to stay to visit the major Classical sites at nearby Byllis and Apollonia. Main roads from the central square lead south to Vlora (35 km or 22 mi) and east to the oil and industrial town of Patos (8 km or 5.0 mi). Also, 19 km (12 mi) to the west of the city centre, one will find the picturesque Seman Beach.

Fier is also known for its olive trees production (Kalinjioti cultivar) which contributes to the olive oil sector of Albania. Together with Vlora, Berat and Elbasan they provide almost 90% of olive oil production.

The city also plays an important economic role in the development of the county since it produces many goods such as sugar, bread and animal products.

The creation of the Trans Adriatic Pipeline raises the economy of Fier and Albania highly. The pipe line will be crossing Fier and a Pumping Station will be built in Fier. This shows an open road to investment and employment of the city and country. The Pipe line has started since 2015 and is expected to be completed in 2020. This will Supply Albania Natural Gas.

=== Transport ===
There are Urban Buses available throughout the city. There are also buses at the bus terminal in Fier that can take you throughout places in Albania and Balkan region. Fier is served by Fier railway station. There used to be trains during the communism era and till this day there has been no movement of the trains. The SH4 is a state road that takes you from Durrës to Fier. The SH8 is also a state road that will take you from Fier to Vlorë. There is a project for the Fier and Vlorë highway.

== Demographics ==
Historical population
Year	Pop.	±%
1950	7,040	—
1960	14,391	+104.4%
1969	22,000	+52.9%
1979	33,100	+50.5%
1989	43,086	+30.2%
2001	56,164	+30.4%
2011	55,845	−0.6%
2023	52,926	−5.2%

Fier is the seventh most populous city and sixth most populous municipality in Albania. As of the 2023 census, the municipal unit of Fier has a population of 52,926 of whom 25,935 were men and 26,991 women. The municipality of Fier, including its adjacent administrative units, had a total population of 101,963 in 2011. (Note: The municipality of Fier consists of the administrative units of Cakran, Dërmenas, Frakull, Levan, Libofshë, Mbrostar, Portëz, Qendër, Topojë and Fier. The population of the municipality results from the sum of the listed administrative units in the former as of the 2011 Albanian census.) Fier, as other cities of southern Albania, has a religious mixed population, consisting of Muslims and Orthodox Christians. Data shows that in 1918, after Albanian independence from the Ottoman Empire, Fier and its surrounding countryside on the Myzeqe Plain formed a majority Orthodox Christian enclave, in which Muslims constituted roughly 35% of the total population.

== Municipal Council ==
Seat distribution in the Municipal Council

Following the 2023 local elections, the composition of the Council of Fier is as follows:

Name	Abbr.	Seats
Socialist Party of Albania; Partia Socialiste e Shqipërisë	PS	33
Together We Win; Bashkë Fitojmë	BF	7
Social Democratic Party of Albania; Partia Socialdemokratike e Shqipërisë	PSD	5
Democratic Party of Albania; Partia Demokrate e Shqipërisë	PD	4
Party for Justice, Integration and Unity; Partia Drejtësi, Integrim dhe Unitet	PDIU	1
Liberal Rightwing Alliance; Aleanca Liberale e Djathtë	ALD	1

== Culture ==
Fier's main sports are football and basketball. The main soccer team of Fier is KF Apolonia and plays in the Albanian First Division. There is another team called KF Çlirimi which plays in the Albanian Second Division. KF Apolonia home ground is Loni Papuçiu Stadium. KF Clirimi plays on Stadiumi Fusha Sportive e Shkolles Bujqesore. The basketball club of Fier is BC Apolonia and plays in the Albanian Basketball League and their home ground is Fier Sports Palace.

== Notable people ==
Notable people born in Fier include:

- Besa Kokëdhima
- Kujtim Majaci
- Eleni Foureira
- Ermal Meta
- Hasna Xhukiçi
- Helena Kadare
- Jani Minga
- Jakov Xoxa
- Mario Gjata
- Keidi Bare
- Liri Gero
- Odise Roshi
- Qemal Bey Vrioni
- Rovena Stefa
- Gledi Mici

Tonç Kilica

== International relations ==
Fier is twinned with:

- Cleveland, Ohio, United States

Fier also cooperates with:

- Lanzhou, Gansu, China
- Peja, Peja District, Kosovo
