= Lushnjë District =

Defunct (2000) Albanian administrative area

Lushnjë District Rrethi i Lushnjës
- Former district
- Coordinates: 40°56′N 19°37′E
- Country: Albania
- Dissolved: 2000
- Seat: Lushnjë

Area
  - Total: 712 km^{2} (275 sq mi)

Population (2001)
  - Total: 144,351
  - Density: 203/km^{2} (525/sq mi)
- Time zone: UTC+1 (CET)
  - Summer (DST): UTC+2 (CEST)

Lushnjë District (Albanian: Rrethi i Lushnjës) was one of the 36 districts of Albania, which were dissolved in July 2000 and replaced by 12 newly created counties. It had a population of 144,351 in 2001, and an area of 712 km^{2} (275 sq mi). It was in the west of the country and 80 km south of Tirana, and its capital was the city of Lushnjë. Its territory is now part of Fier County: the municipalities of Lushnjë and Divjakë.

== Administrative divisions ==
The district consisted of the following municipalities:

- Allkaj
- Ballagat
- Bubullimë
- Divjakë
- Dushk
- Fier-Shegan
- Golem
- Grabian
- Gradishtë
- Hysgjokaj
- Karbunarë
- Kolonjë
- Krutje
- Lushnjë
- Remas
- Tërbuf
