= Andrea Shundi =

Albanian agronomist (1934–2024)

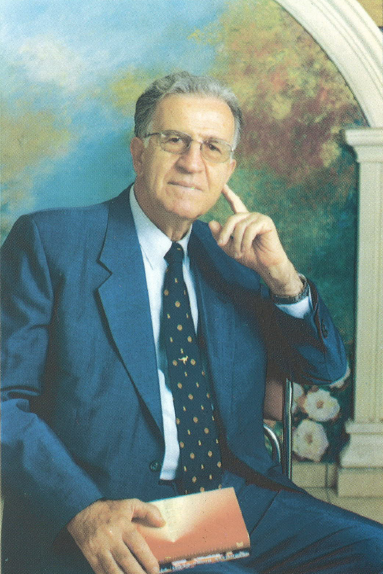
- Born: November 15, 1934; Tirana, Albania
- Died: April 30, 2024 (aged 89); Chapel Hill, North Carolina, U.S.
- Resting place: Chapel Hill Memorial Cemetery
- Education: Agricultural University of Tirana
- Occupation: Agronomist
- Title: PhD

Andrea Shundi (November 15, 1934 – April 30, 2024) was an Albanian-American agronomist. His academic research and publications focused mainly on the forage systems as a source feeding of the livestock, on viticulture and viniculture, and also on the history of the Albanian agriculture.

One of the main authors of university level textbooks in Albania and lecturer and then dean at the Faculty of Agriculture of the Agricultural University of Tirana, Shundi has also been an active participant in many international conferences and symposia on forage systems and viticulture. He often lectured in Italian and Greek agricultural universities as a guest. Along with Mentor Përmeti he was one of the organisers of the first pan Albanian conference on Agriculture scientific work in 1975 and in 1991 he was the organiser of the second and last conference of that level.

== Life and works ==
=== Early years and scientific work in Albania ===
Andrea Shundi was born on November 15, 1934, in Tirana, Albania. After finishing high school in his native city, he attended the Agricultural University of Tirana, where he pursued studies in Agronomy and graduated in 1956. From 1956 to 1960 Shundi was a researcher at the Institute of Agricultural Research in Lushnje. In 1960-1962 he was chief agronomist of the Agricultural Cooperative of Krutje, Lushnje, and in 1962-1964 he was Chief Agronomist of the Agricultural Department of the Lushnje District. During the 1956-1964 period he conducted experiments and published studies on the periods, depth, and tillage methods for the main types of the arable lands and for each climatic zone of Albania. At that time Shundi was also basketball as well as volleyball player/coach of the polisports' club of the city of Lushnja, KS Traktori, which then played in the respective Albanian Basketball League and the Albanian Volleyball Leagues, the highest national divisions.

During the 1964–1975 period Shundi was Director of the Livestock Feeds, Field Crops and Scientific Research Department in the Ministry of Agriculture of Albania. In this period Shundi's research work focused on forage systems, used for a coordinated development of the sources of the forage crop production. The main objective of the forage systems is the natural integration of all the forage sources of feeding the livestock: the annual and perennial plants of the arable lands, the forage crops, the forest and fruit trees, and shrubs. Shundi introduced the forage systems in his monograph, the Bimët Foragjere në Zonën e Ftohtë (English: Forage Crops in Cold Climates), which was published in Tirana in 1974. A much larger republication of the book was done 30 years later, in 2004.

From 1975 to 1976 Shundi was director of the Agriculture Department of the Kukës District, and during the 1976-1980 period he was the director of the Seed Enterprise of Tirana. In 1980-1992 he was first a professor, and then dean of the Agricultural Faculty of the Agricultural University of Tirana. During this period the main research of Shundi focused on the coordination of plant cultivation (Albanian: bashkërendim i kulturave bujqësore) and consociation of plant cultivation (Albanian: bashkëshoqërim i kulturave bujqësore) A third concept was introduced by Shundi in the Albanian agriculture, the Coefficient of Land Usage (CLU) (Albanian: Koefiçenti i përdorimit të tokës), which is a measuring indicator that determines the degree of intensity of use of agricultural land through plant cultivation. The CLU includes units of mass, area, money, and time (usually ton per ha/$/days) and is used for both the coordination and the consociation of plant cultivation.

During 1994–1998, Shundi was scientific secretary of the Natural and Technical Sciences Section of the Academy of Sciences of Albania.

=== Migration to the United States and work (1998-2024) ===
Shundi retired from the Academy of Sciences in 1998, and migrated to the United States where he became a citizen. There he continued to write books on the forage systems with the Albanian peculiarities, but also started to focus on the history of the Albanian agriculture on the whole, and the Albanian viticulture and viniculture in particular.

In his writings Shundi describes the history of the Albanian agriculture, which is a main part of the history of the Albanian people. His book, Bujqësia dhe Veprimi Agronomik në Troje Shqiptare (2001) (English: Agriculture and Agronomic Activity in Albanian lands), was the first historical book ever published on the history of the Albanian agriculture. The books chronologically focuses from the Neolithic Age until the 20th century. Shundi's second book on the history of the Albanian agriculture, Historia e Bujqësisë dhe Agroindustrisë Shqiptare (2003) (English: History of the Albanian Agriculture and Agroindustry) focuses on Medieval, Ottoman Albania, and Albanian National Awakening period, encompassing a period from the 6th to the 19th centuries. Another chapter of the book, written by Shundi, covers the history of agricultural education and scientific research in Albania. His third book on the history of the Albanian agriculture, Jetë Agronomike (2004) (English: Agronomic Life), focuses on the history of Albanian agriculture in the second half of the 20th century. Professor Velesin Peçuli, then Rector of the Agricultural University of Tirana prefaced the book where he points out rigorous scientific work of Shundi.

After 10 monographs on the forage crops, in 2004 Shundi published the Bimët Foragjere në Zonën e Ftohtë.(English: Forage Crops in Cold Climates). The book is accompanied by a technical explanatory vocabulary of key words and technical terms.

From 2001 to 2010 Shundi also published 6 books on viticulture and viniculture. Vreshtaria Praktike.(English: Practical Viticulture), published in 2001, was praised in its preface by Italian academic Eugenio Sartori as a good omen for the Albanian viticulture, which has a long tradition. The book was followed by another publication, in 2004, Vreshtaria dhe Verëtaria Shqiptare, (English: Albanian Viti-Viniculture), which was prefaced by Albanian professor, Moikom Zeqo. Zeqo calls the book a synthesis of both an old and a young mentality for the viticulture and viniculture. In addition, he describes the book as a testimony to the Albanian culture on wine, as a subtract of a larger Mediterranean wine culture. The book is in Albanian with a partial translation into English. In 2006 Shundi published Fjalor Shtjellues për Vreshtarinë dhe Verëtarinë.(English: Explanatory Vocabulary of Viti-Viniculture), prefaced by the Albanian linguist, head of the coordinating group of the Albanian Encyclopaedia, Emil Lafe, who praises the book as a mature work that spans on the linguistic side as well as on the Agricultural one. The book includes terms and proverbs used in Arvanitic, Cham Albanian, and Arbëreshë, as well as terms in Gheg Albanian, which are not commonly used in today's Albanian, and thus attempts to include all the linguistic riches of the Albanian language.

In 2008 Shundi published Prodhimi Shtëpiak i Rrushit dhe Verës (English: Homemade production of Grape and Wine), prefaced by well known Albanian professor Aleko Minga, who described the book as a great means of diffusion of the Albanian agricultural culture. In 2010 Shundi published two additional books, Fjalor Enciklopedik per Vreshtarinë dhe Verëtarinë (English: Encyclopedic Dictionary of Viti-Viniculture), prefaced by Prof. Resmi Osmani. The following book, called Vreshta dhe Kantina Shqiptare, (English: Albanian Wineyards and Cellars), includes a description of the most successful Albanian vineyards and cantines in Albanian, Kosovo, Macedonia, and Montenegro.

Shundi is widely cited by his peers such as by Lush Susaj, Professor at the Agricultural University of Tirana, Vineyards Cultivation, Tirana 2009, Kosovan professor and academic Latif Susuri Dictionary: Plants, Parasytes, Pathogens Prishtina 2005, Dictionary of Agricultural and Forestry Plants, and Weeds, Prishtina 2006, Professor Fatmir Voci in his Practices of Viticulture, 2007 (FAO Project), and Velesin Peculi in his Organic Agriculture Tirana 2005.

=== Agricultural Conferences Organiser ===
Shundi has been an organiser and coordinator of 11 national meetings on the agricultural science. Along with academic Mentor Përmeti he organised in 1975 an Albanian National Conference on Agricultural Sciences. Shundi organised a second national conference of this dimension 1991, called Agriculture under the new economical Developments in Albania, and focused on the major economic transformations of the Albanian agriculture following the transitory period of the History of post-Communist Albania.

In addition to these major conferences dedicated to the Albanian agriculture as a whole, Shundi also organized 11 pan-Albanian conferences on viticulture and viniculture in Albania and Kosovo in the 2001-2023 period. Last he was co-organizer of two scientific conferences on Albanian wines along with the Academies of Sciences of Albania and Kosovo (a 2017 seminar held in Rahovec, Kosovo on the Vranç wine and a 2022 symposium held in Tirana, Albania on 10 local wines of Albania and Kosovo).

=== Participation in International Congresses ===
Shundi took papers in the following international congresses and symposia:

- Five professional delegations of Albania at the Food and Agriculture Organization's General World or European meetings (in 1973, 1980, 1981, 1985, and 1987).
- Symposium of the Italian Association of the Agronomy (Potenza Italy, 1991)
- Symposium of the European Network of the Food and Agriculture Organization (Nitra, Slovakia, 1992)
- International Symposium on forages organised by the Mediterranean Agronomic Institute (Bari Italy, 1992)
- Symposium of the European Network of the FAO on the forages (Montpellier, France, 1987)
- XVIIth International Grassland Congress (Palmerston North, New Zealand 1993)
- Symposium of the European Network of the Food and Agriculture Organizationon forages (Chania, Greece, 1993)
- Vth International Congress on forages (Salt Lake City, USA, 1995)
- Symposium of the Italian Association of forests and the Italian Minister of Agriculture (Verona, Italy, 1996)
- VIth International Congress on forages (Townsville, Australia, 1999)
- Five international conferences on viticulture and viniculture organised by world's largest grapevine nursery Vivai Cooperativi Rauscedo during the (1997–2007) period (two in Italy, one in Bordeaux, France, one in Athens, Greece, and one in Porto, Portugal)

=== Memberships ===
Shundi was Albanian representative of the European Federation for Forage Plants during the 1995–1999 period, a board member of the TEMPUS project for Albania, organised by the EU during the 1991–1992 period. He was elected head of the Albanian association of the agronomists in 1991. He was also a board member of the Committee of Science and Technics in Albania in the 1990–1992 period, a board member in the Albanian National Commission for Scientific Post Doc qualification in the 1990–1992 period. During 2003-2009 he was a member of the editorial board on Agriculture for the draft of the Albanian Encyclopedia by the Academy of Sciences of Albania and the Academy of Sciences and Arts of Kosovo. He is again member of the editorial board for the new encyclopedia project, started in 2023.

Earlier he was a board member of the scientific councils of the Agricultural University of Tirana (1987–1992), and president of the Scientific Council of the Faculty of Agronomy (1984–1992). He was also member of the scientific councils of the Fan Noli University (1987–1992), the Institute of Forage Research in Fushë-Krujë, (1984–1992), the Institute of Agricultural Research in Lushnje (1978–1987).

=== Death ===
Andrea Shundi died from pancreatic cancer at his home in Chapel Hill, North Carolina, on April 30, 2024, at the age of 89.

== Acknowledgements and awards ==
In September 2008 the Ministry of Agriculture of Kosovo recognised the work of Shundi through an acknowledgement of the contributions in the scientific work in the field of viticulture and viniculture. On November 1, 2010, Shundi was awarded the medal of Grand Master of Work from the President of Albania, Bamir Topi with the following motivation:

...for important contributions in the field of agricultural production, for treating and improving the farming land, for contributions to the systems of seeds' selections, and for the creation and enhancement of institutions of scientific research, as well as for teachings in the agricultural field.

In December 2010 the Association of the Agricultural Journalists of Albania acknowledged the work of Shundi for "important contributions in research and publications in the field of agronomy of Albania".

On May 8, 2023, Shundi received the Nderi i Akademisë (English: Honor of the Academy) award from the Academy of Sciences of Albania.

== List of publications ==
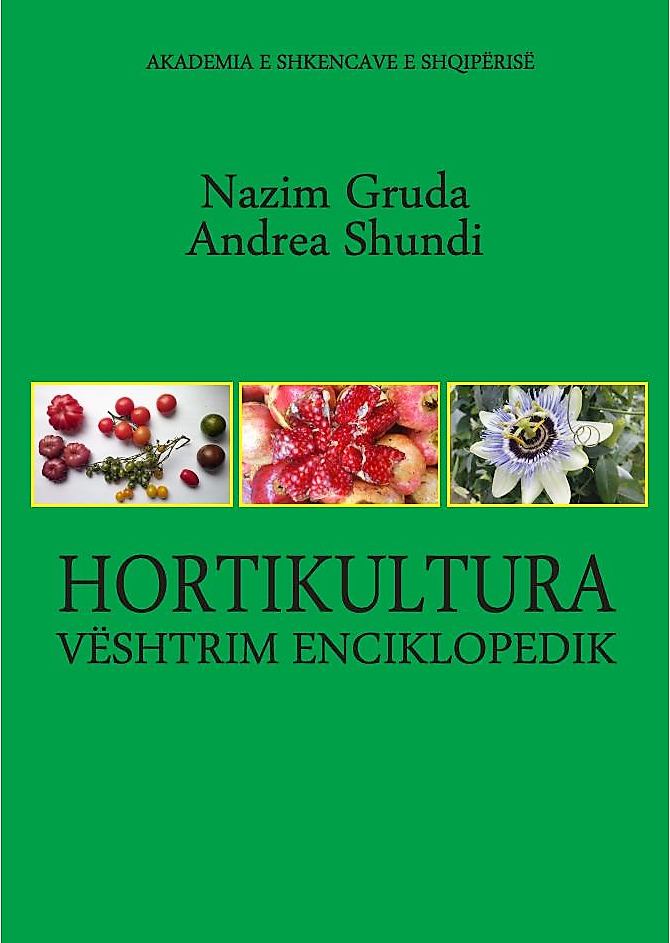
Book cover of Hortikultura: vështrim enciklopedik (English: Horticulture: an encyclopedic view), published by the Academy of Sciences of Albania and co-authored with Nazim Gruda

Shundi published the following from 1969 through 2017:

=== Monographs ===
- 2023 Ushqimi dhe (Eno)Gastronomia Shqiptare (English: Albanian Food and Enogastronomy), co-authored with 8 other professors
- 2019 Verëtaria Praktike (English: Practical Viniculture), co-authored with Rexhep Kryeziu Lena Publishing House, Prishtina, Kosovo
- 2017 Hortikultura: vështrim enciklopedik (English: Horticulture: an encyclopedic view), published by the Academy of Sciences of Albania and co-authored with Nazim Gruda. The book includes 4,600 scientific terms and around 1,000 synonyms. In the Albanian language is one of the most detailed and important publications on horticulture. The book was presented on June 2, 2017, in a symposium by the Academy, which highlighted the originality of the included content and earned the book the “Petrit Radovicka” award.
- 2016 E(t)nogastronomia Arbëreshe (English: The Arbëresh Ethnogastronomy), published by Vllamasi Publishing House Tirana), also published by Rubbettino Editore (Cosenza) in Italian in 2017. In it are included 610 dish recipes and 30 types of arbëresh wines. The volume also includes a glossary in Arbëresh-Albanian-Italian and 620 Arbëresh proverbs on wine making and ethnogastronomy.
- 2012 Enciklopedi për Vreshtarinë dhe Verëtarinë, (English: Encyclopedia on Viticulture and Viniculture) published by Vllamasi Publishing House Tirana. This 870 pages book includes 3,200 articles and 3,800 synonyms that focus on wine and winemaking terminology in the Albanian language, as well as Albanian 750 proverbs from all Albanian-inhabited areas. The book was reviewed by linguists Emil Lafe and Jorgo Bulo.
- 2012 Wisdom From Vine And Wine - 600 proverbs and stories on viti-viniculture with technical interpretations
- 2010 Fjalor Enciklopedik per Vreshtarinë dhe Verëtarinë (English: Encyclopedic Dictionary of Viti-Viniculture) Dita Publishing House, Tirana, Albania
- 2010 Vreshta dhe Kantina Shqiptare (English: Albanian Wineyards and Cellars)
- 2009 Fjalori Enciklopedik Shqiptar (English: Albanian Encyclopaedia) - author of 15 articles in the Academy of Sciences of Albania encyclopedia
- 2008 Prodhimi Shtëpiak i Rrushit dhe Verës (English: Homemade production of Grape and Wine) Onufri Publishing House, Tirana, Albania
- 2006 Fjalor Shtjellues për Vreshtarinë dhe Verëtarinë.(English: Explanatory Vocabulary of Viti-Viniculture), Tirana, Albania
- 2004 Vreshtaria dhe Verëtaria Shqiptare, (English: Albanian Viti-Viniculture)
- 2004 Bimët Foragjere në Zonën e Ftohtë (English: Forage Crops in Cold Climates) First publication, in a shorter form was in 1974.
- 2004 Jetë Agronomike (English: Agronomic Life)
- 2003 Historia e Bujqësisë dhe Agroindustrisë Shqiptare (English: History of the Albanian Agriculture and Agroindustry)
- 2001 Vreshtaria Praktike (English: Practical Viticulture)
- 2001 Bujqësia dhe Veprimi Agronomik në Troje Shqiptare (English: Agriculture and Agronomic Activity in Albanian lands)
- 1990 Shtimi i Bashkëshoqërimeve dhe i Koeficientit të Përdorimit të Tokës me Bimësi Foragjere(English: Increase of consociations and of the Land-use Coefficient with Forage Crops) Shtëpia e Propagandës Bujqësore, Tirana, Albania
- 1990 Development of Agriculture in Albania Naim Frashëri Publishing House
- 1988 Bashkërendime të Agroteknologjisë me Biologjinë e Selitjes së Bimëve(English: Coordination of Agrotechnology with Plant Biology) Shtëpia e Propagandës Bujqësore, Tirana, Albania
- 1985 Fjalori Enciklopedik Shqiptar (English: Albanian Encyclopaedia) - author of 8 articles
- 1984 Agroteknologji dhe Veçori të Prodhimit Foragjer (English: Agrotechnologies and Forage Crop Production) Shtëpia e Propagandës Bujqësore, Tirana, Albania
- 1981 Përmirësime Agronomike në Prodhimin e Hasëlleve (English: Agronomical Improvement of Forage Crop with Annuals) Shtëpia e Propagandës Bujqësore, Tirana, Albania
- 1974 Prodhimi Intensiv nga Bimësia Foragjere dhe Blegtoria (English: Intensive Forage Crop Production and Livestock Husbandry) Shtëpia e Propagandës Bujqësore, Tirana, Albania
- 1970 Probleme në Bazën Ushqimore të Blegtorisë (English: Problems to improve in the Livestock Feeds)
- 1969 Prodhimi i Bimësisë Foragjere (English: Production of Livestock Feeds)
- 1969 Doracak për Sistemimin e Tokave (English: Guidebook for land systematization) Agricultural University of Tirana publisher

=== University textbooks ===
- 1988 Bimët Foragjere (English: Forage Crops)
- 1984 Bujqësia e Përgjithëshme dhe Bimët Foragjere (English: Agricultural Practices and Forage Crops)
- 1984 Përgjithësime Ligjësish dhe Parametrash për Selitjen e Bimëve të Arave (English: Generalization of Laws and Parameters of Cultivation of Field Crops)
- 1983 and 1988 Ligjërata për Prodhimin Foragjer Intensiv (English: Lectures on Intensive Forage Production)
- 1980 and 1987 Fitoteknia (English: Forage Crops)
- 1974 and 1982 Bimët e Arave (English: Arable Lands Crops)
- 1974 Bazat e Bujqësisë (English: Agriculture Fundamentals)

=== Booklets ===
- 1965–1981 8 booklets on the foraging systems

=== Scientific articles published in technical journals ===
- 1958–2023: 144 technical and scientific articles, published in Albanian and international journals such as HERBA (FAOs journal), MEDIT (Agronomic Institute of the Mediterranean, published in Bari, Italy), DAEDALUS (University of Cosenza, Italy), Irrigazione e Drenaggio (Bologna-Italy). Among these publications it is worthy mentioning the contribution in the fifth international rangeland congress Rangelands in a Sustainable Biosphere Proceedings of the Fifth International Rangelands Congress Contributed Presentations pps. 512-513
- 1958–1964 18 articles on the soil tillage systems and the seeds' selection.

== See also ==
- Albanian wine

== Sources ==
- Akademia e Shkencave e Shqipërisë (2009), Fjalor Enciklopedik Shqiptar (in Albanian), Tirana: Qendra e Enciklopedisë Shqiptare, ISBN 978-9995610326
- Blliku, Haxhi (2007), 55 vjet Instituti i Kërkimeve Bujqësore (in Albanian), Tirana: Albgraf
- Demneri, Ismail (2005), Tirana, personalitete shkence (in Albanian), Tirana: Shoqata "Tirana", ISBN 99943-793-2-1
- Foto, Illo (2009), Shkencëtarët e vërtetë të bujqësisë shqiptare (in Albanian), Tirana: Julvin 2, ISBN 978-99943-929-2-6
- Karaj, Selim (2003), Kërkimi shkencor në bimët foragjere (in Albanian), Tirana: Albgraf
- Këshilli i Ekspertëve të Agrobiznesit (2003), Historia e bujqësisë dhe agroindustrisë shqiptare (in Albanian), Tirana: KEA, ISBN 99927-873-8-4
- Muzaka, Jorgji (2011), Personalitete që adhuroj (in Albanian), Tirana
- Peculi, Velesin (2005), Bujqësi biologjike (in Albanian), Tirana: Toena, ISBN 99943-1-021-6
