= Mentor Përmeti =

Albanian agronomist

Mentor Përmeti (December 20, 1920, in Tirana, Albania – March 5, 2015, in New York, NY, United States) was an Albanian agronomist.

== Biography ==
He pursued his high school in his native city and graduated in Sofia University, Bulgaria, in 1951. He returned to Albania upon graduation and started to work at the Institute of Agricultural Research. Subsequently he worked at the Department of Agriculture of Albania with different responsibilities. In 1956 he started working as a director at the Agricultural University of Tirana, and, in 1958, he became director of the Institute of Agricultural Research, which had by then transferred to the city of Lushnjë. In 1961 he returned as a vice-provost of the Agricultural University of Tirana. In 1962 he was named Deputy Secretary of the Department of Agriculture until 1967, when he was named provost of the Agricultural University, where he stayed until 1976. In 1976 he was named chief agronomist of the state enterprise “29 Nëntori” of Lushnje. In 1982 he was named deputy chief of the Committee of Sciences and Techniques. In 1984 he started working at the Institute of Biological Research until 1990 when he retired.

In 1971 Permeti received the "Professor" title. In 1979 he received the Republic award for the creation of the wheat variety “Dajti” which started to be massively used in production in Albania. In 2002 he receives the medal of Grand Master of Work. He was a member of the Academy of Sciences of Albania. The city of Përmet proclaimed him Citizen of Honour.
