= Adriatik Hoxha =

Albanian shot putter (born 1990)

Personal information
- Born: 9 March 1990 (age 36) Kolonjë, Fier, Albania
- Height: 1.94 m (6 ft 4 1/2 in)
- Weight: 130 kg (290 lb)

Sport
- Country: Albania
- Sport: Athletics
- Event: Shot put
- Updated on 15 August 2012

Adriatik Hoxha (born 9 March 1990 in Kolonjë, Fier) is an Albanian athlete who specializes in the shot put. He represented his country at the 2012 Summer Olympics failing to qualify for the final.

== Competition record ==
Year	Competition	Venue	Position	Notes
Representing Albania
2009	Mediterranean Games	Pescara, Italy	11th	16.02 m
2009	World Championships	Berlin, Germany	34th (q)	15.89 m
2012	European Championships	Helsinki, Finland	24th (q)	17.00 m
2012	Olympic Games	London, United Kingdom	36th (q)	17.58 m
2013	European Indoor Championships	Gothenburg, Sweden	24th (q)	17.01 m
