= Fier-Seman =

- Village
- Location within Albania
- Coordinates: 40°53′N 19°34′E
- Country: Albania
- County: Fier
- Municipality: Divjakë
- Administrative unit: Gradishtë
- Time zone: UTC+1 (CET)
  - Summer (DST): UTC+2 (CEST)

Fier-Seman is a small village in the Fier County, western Albania. It is part of the former municipality Gradishtë. At the 2015 local government reform it became part of the municipality Divjakë.
