= Jaçellari =

Jaçellari is an Albanian surname. Notable people with the surname include:

- Halil Jaçellari (1940–2009), Albanian writer and translator
- Ilir Jaçellari (born 1970), Albanian actor, painter and photographer
