= KS Arnisa =

Albanian football club

Arnisa
- Full name: Klubi Sportiv Arnisa
- Founded: 26 July 2022; 3 years ago
- Owner: Skënder Muja
- League: Kategoria e Tretë
- 2023–24: Kategoria e Tretë, Group A, 5th
- Website: kfcerma.al

KS Arnisa is an Albanian professional football club based in Tërbuf. They last competed in Kategoria e Tretë during the 2023–24 season, finishing fifth in Group A.

== History ==
The idea of founding a football club in the village of Çermë e Sipërme was first proposed on April 20, 2000, by Skënder Muja and a group of locals. Although informal at the start, the initiative was driven by the community's passion for football and the desire to create opportunities for local youth to engage in sports.

A few years later, Mr. Muja took steps to formalize the club, shouldering the financial responsibilities himself. On July 26, 2022, Çerma Football Club was officially registered, allowing it to participate in Kategoria e Tretë, the fourth tier of Albanian football. The club also established teams across various age groups, participating actively in regional championships.

The club logo displayed two sheaves of wheat, representing the agricultural and humble roots of the region and a soccer ball which symbolized unity and teamwork. The dark blue color evoked the sea, signifying aspirations for great achievements.

Çerma FC partnered with the municipality of Divjakë, forming an unofficial agreement to represent the broader administrative region. This collaboration resulted in a rebranding, with the club changing its name to KS Arnisa on August 28, 2023, in reference to the ancient Illyrian city of the same name, located in the nearby settlement of Babunje.

The transition also saw the club evolve from a non-profit organization (NPO) into a joint-stock company (SHA), with 100% of the shares owned by Skënder Muja, who continues to serve as the club's president.

KS Arnisa is a member of the Fier Regional Football Association.
