= 2023–24 Kategoria e Tretë =

Kategoria e Tretë
- Season: 2023–24
- Champions: Basania; 1st title
- Promoted: Basania; Memaliaj
- Matches: 95
- Goals: 378 (3.98 per match)
- Top goalscorer: Kalonji Nyanguila (11 goals)
- Biggest home win: Bulqiza 7−0 Përmeti (2 March 2024); Prestige 7−0 Kinostudio (14 April 2024)
- Biggest away win: Kinostudio 0−6 Bulqiza (21 April 2024); Kinostudio 1−7 Eagle FA (7 April 2024)
- Highest scoring: Basania 7−3 Kinostudio (3 March 2024)
- Longest winning run: 6 matches Albpetrol; Memaliaj
- Longest unbeaten run: 11 matches Bulqiza
- Longest winless run: 14 matches Kinostudio
- Longest losing run: 14 matches Kinostudio

The 2023–24 Kategoria e Tretë was the 21st official season of the Albanian football fourth division since its establishment. The season began on 14 November 2023 and ended on 11 May 2024. There were 15 teams competing this season, split in 2 groups.Basania and Memaliaj gained promotion to the 2024–25 Kategoria e Dytë.

== Changes from last season ==
=== Team changes ===
==== From Kategoria e Tretë ====
Promoted to Kategoria e Dytë:

- Adriatiku
- Albanët
- Këlcyra

==== To Kategoria e Tretë ====
Relegated from Kategoria e Dytë:

- Albpetrol
- Bulqiza
- Memaliaj
- Tepelena
2023–24 Kategoria e Tretë teams:
Group A; Group B

=== Stadia by capacity and locations ===
==== Group A ====
Team	Location	Stadium	Capacity
Arnisa	Tërbuf	Kompleksi Sportiv Egnatia	
Basania	Bushat	Basania Stadium	
Bulqiza	Bulqizë	National Sports Centre	50
Eagle FA	Tirana	Skënder Halili Complex	
Kinostudio	Tirana	National Sports Centre	50
Klosi	Klos	Dali Farruku Pitch	
Përmeti	Përmet	National Sports Centre	50
Prestige	Tirana	Internacional Complex	1,000

==== Group B ====
Team	Location	Stadium	Capacity
Albpetrol	Patos	Alush Noga Stadium	2,150
Gramozi	Ersekë	Ersekë Stadium	2,000
Himara	Himarë	Skënder Halili Complex	
Memaliaj	Memaliaj	Karafil Çaushi Stadium	1,500
Osumi	Ura Vajgurore	Osumi Stadium	
Skrapari	Çorovodë	Skrapar Sports Field	1,500
Tepelena	Tepelenë	Sabaudin Shehu Stadium	2,000

== League standings ==
=== Group A ===
Pos	Team	Pld	W	D	L	GF	GA	GD	Pts	Promotion
1	Basania (C, P)	14	9	3	2	34	16	+18	30	Promotion to 2024–25 Kategoria e Dytë
2	Eagle FA	14	9	3	2	42	18	+24	30	Play-off promotion to 2024–25 Kategoria e Dytë
3	Bulqiza	14	8	4	2	42	16	+26	28	
4	Prestige	14	9	1	4	34	13	+21	28	
5	Arnisa	14	7	0	7	28	26	+2	21	
6	Klosi	14	4	1	9	17	34	−17	13	
7	Përmeti	14	4	0	10	21	44	−23	12	
8	Kinostudio	14	0	0	14	14	65	−51	0	

Rules for classification: 1) points; 2) head-to-head points; 3) head-to-head goal difference; 4) goal difference; 5) number of goals scored; 6) draw. (Head-to-head record is applied for clubs with the same number of points only once all matches between said clubs have been played.)
(C) Champions; (P) Promoted

=== Results ===
Home \ Away	ARN	BAS	BUL	EAG	KIN	KLO	PËR	PRE
Arnisa	—	1–2	2–3	2–1	3–2	3–1	5–0	0–3
Basania	2–1	—	1–1	1–1	7–3	5–1	2–1	1–2
Bulqiza	3–2	2–2	—	1–3	6–2	4–0	7–0	2–0
Eagle FA	4–1	1–4	0–0	—	5–2	4–1	5–1	2–2
Kinostudio	1–4	1–3	0–6	1–7	—	0–1	0–5	1–5
Klosi	0–1	1–0	2–2	1–3	3–1	—	3–1	0–3
Përmeti	1–3	0–3	0–4	1–5	3–0	5–2	—	0–3
Prestige	3–0	0–1	2–1	0–1	7–0	2–1	2–3	—

Legend: Blue = home team win; Yellow = draw; Red = away team win.
For upcoming matches, an "a" indicates there is an article about the rivalry between the two participants.

=== Group B ===
Pos	Team	Pld	W	D	L	GF	GA	GD	Pts	Promotion
1	Memaliaj (P)	12	11	0	1	33	8	+25	33	Promotion to 2024–25 Kategoria e Dytë
2	Albpetrol	12	9	2	1	29	6	+23	29	Play-off promotion to 2024–25 Kategoria e Dytë
3	Osumi	12	7	1	4	25	17	+8	22	
4	Tepelena	12	6	0	6	23	26	−3	18	
5	Gramozi	12	4	2	6	20	18	+2	14	
6	Himara	12	1	1	10	8	36	−28	4	
7	Skrapari	12	1	0	11	9	36	−27	3	

Rules for classification: 1) points; 2) head-to-head points; 3) head-to-head goal difference; 4) goal difference; 5) number of goals scored; 6) draw. (Head-to-head record is applied for clubs with the same number of points only once all matches between said clubs have been played.)
(P) Promoted

=== Results ===
Home \ Away	ALB	GRA	HIM	MEM	OSU	SKR	TEP
Albpetrol	—	2–0	3–0	1–0	3–0	5–0	5–2
Gramozi	2–2	—	3–0	1–2	0–2	5–0	3–1
Himara	0–4	1–1	—	0–2	0–2	0–2	1–2
Memaliaj	2–0	2–1	5–0	—	2–0	3–0	4–1
Osumi	0–0	4–2	7–1	0–3	—	4–0	3–0
Skrapari	0–2	0–1	0–3	3–5	2–3	—	1–3
Tepelena	0–2	2–1	5–2	1–3	4–0	2–1	—

Legend: Blue = home team win; Yellow = draw; Red = away team win.
For upcoming matches, an "a" indicates there is an article about the rivalry between the two participants.

== Final ==
11 May 2024
16:00

Basania	3−0	Memaliaj
Mila 80'; Shimaj 83'; Leka 90'

Vorë Stadium, Vorë
Referee: Florjan Lata

== Promotion play-off ==
6 May 2024
16:00

Eagle FA	0−1	Albpetrol
	Report	Xhoxhaj 5'

Vorë Stadium, Vorë
Referee: Indrit Myrtja

Albpetrol qualified to the final play-off match.

== Top scorers ==
Rank	Player	Club	Goals
1	(Democratic Republic of the Congo) Kalonji Nyanguila	Eagle FA	11
2	(Albania) Geraldo Hysi	Memaliaj	10
3	(Albania) Alessio Çibuku	Eagle FA	9
3	(Albania) Armando Mezini	Arnisa	9
3	(Albania) Armend Murrja	Bulqiza	9
6	(Albania) Aleksandros Pashaj	Tepelena	8
6	(Albania) Olger Hyzellari	Memaliaj	8
