= Agricultural University of Tirana =

Agricultural university in Tirana, Albania

Coordinates: 41°21′44″N 19°46′16″E

- Universiteti Bujqësor i Tiranës (UBT)
- Type: Public
- Established: July 28, 1951
- Endowment: Financed by the Government of Albania
- Rector: Prof. Dr. Fatbardh Sallaku
- Faculty: 480
- Students: 14.000+
- Location: Tirana, Albania
- Campus: Tirana
- Colors
- Website: www.ubt.edu.al

University rankings

Regional – Overall
- QS Emerging Europe and Central Asia: 351-400 (2022)

The Agricultural University of Tirana (Albanian: Universiteti Bujqësor I Tiranës) is a public university located in Tirana, Albania. It offers education in agronomy, veterinary, forestry, ecology, agribusiness, and similar subjects.

== History ==
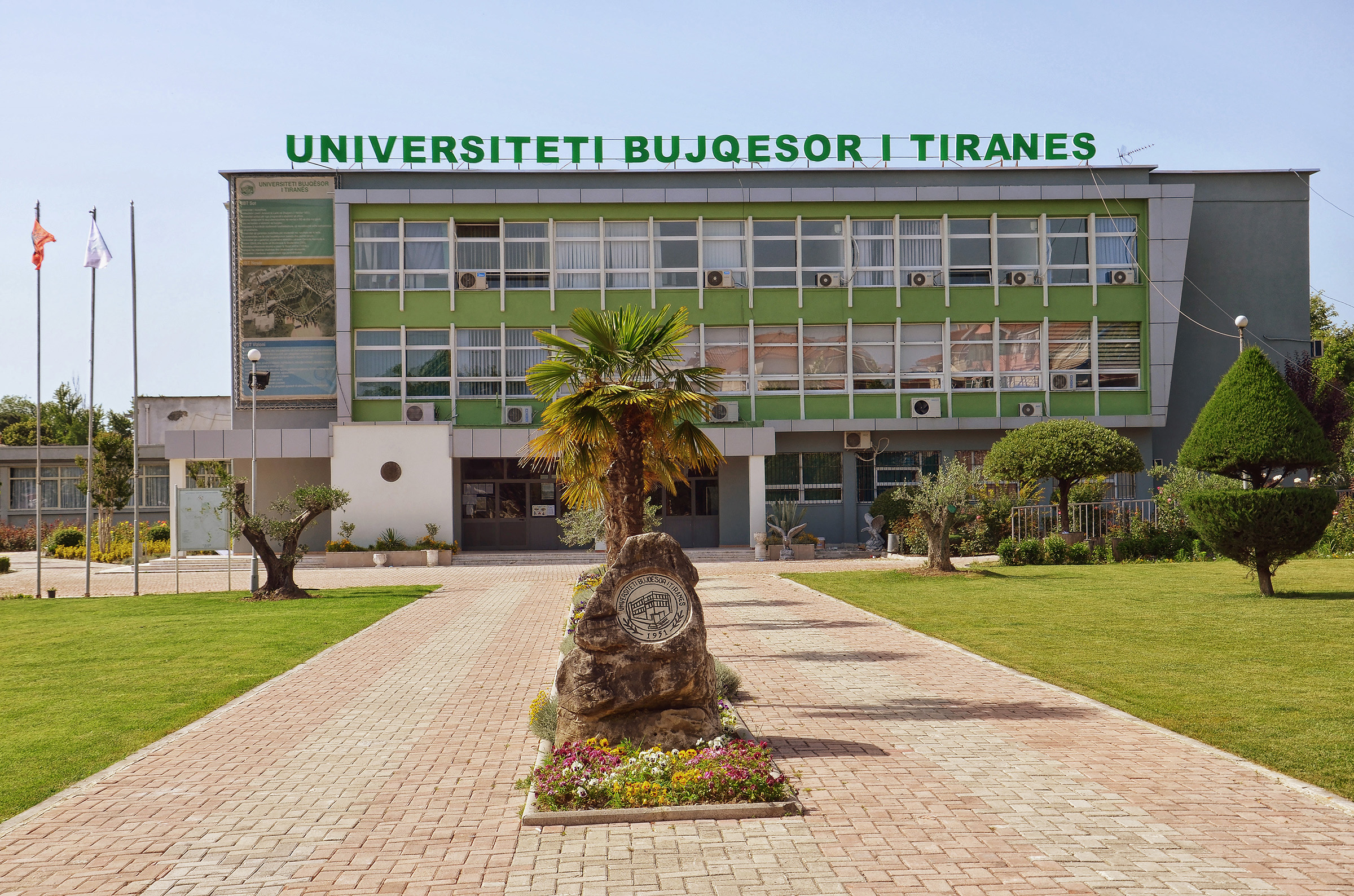
UBT Headquarters in Kamez, Tirana, Albania

AUT was created in 1951. It was first called "High Institute of Agriculture" (Albanian: Instituti i Lartë Bujqësor). It received its current name in 1991.

Today it is the unique centre in Albania for undergraduate and graduate studies, scientific research, training and extension in the area of agriculture and food (Agronomy, Horticulture and Plant Protection, Agribusiness, Economy and Agrarian Policy, Environment and Natural Resources, Agro-food Technology, Animal Husbandry and Business, Aquaculture and Fishery Management, Forestry Engineering, Veterinary Medicine, etc.

=== Llogara Tragedy ===
Tragedy of Llogara
- Date: 22 November 1989
- Time: 14:00 CET (bus accident); 19:00 CET (helicopter crash)
- Location: Kudhes, Albania (bus accident) Vuno and Llogara Pass, Himara, Albania (helicopter crash)
- Deaths: 23

The Tragedy of Llogara refers to a bus accident and helicopter crash near Himare, Albania. On 22 November 1989, a bus carrying students from the university fell from a ravine and crashed along the mountainous road between Himara and Vuno in Albania. As a result, Albanian authorities sent two helicopters to carry casualties back to Tirana. However, the weather conditions were deteriorating with heavy fog in the area. Despite such a setback, pilots decided to fly back to Tirana carrying the casualties, only to crash their helicopters on a mountain side near Vuno and Llogora respectively killing all people aboard.

== Academics and size ==
Every year around 15.000 students start their studies at the Agricultural University of Tirana. The actual academic staff is composed of 55 professors, 48 associated professors, 55 doctors, 13 pedagogues – lecturers and 64 assistants.

== Faculties and departments ==
AUT includes the following faculties:

- Faculty of Agriculture and Environment ("Fakulteti i Bujqësisë dhe Mjedisit")
- Faculty of Economy and Agribusiness ("Fakulteti i Ekonomisë dhe Agrobiznesit")
- Faculty of Forest Sciences ("Fakulteti i Shkencave Pyjore ")
- Faculty of Veterinary Medicine ("Fakulteti i Mjekësisë Veterinare ")
- Faculty of Biotechnology and Food ("Fakulteti i Bioteknologjisë dhe Ushqimit")

== Notable professors ==
- Pirro Dodbiba
- Mentor Përmeti
- Niko Qafzezi
- Andrea Shundi
- Myqerem Tafaj

== See also ==
- List of universities in Albania
- Quality Assurance Agency of Higher Education
- List of colleges and universities
- List of colleges and universities by country
- Agriculture in Albania
