= Gradishtë =

- Administrative unit
- Location within Albania
- Coordinates: 40°53′15″N 19°35′15″E
- Country: Albania
- County: Fier
- Municipality: Divjakë

Population (2011)
  - Administrative unit: 7,521
- Time zone: UTC+1 (CET)
  - Summer (DST): UTC+2 (CEST)

Gradishtë is a municipality in the Fier County, western Albania. At the 2015 local government reform it became a subdivision of the municipality Divjakë. The population at the 2011 census was 7,521. The region is populated by Albanians and Aromanians.

The municipal unit comprises the following locations:

- Këmishtaj
- Mertish
- Goricaj
- Sopës
- Fier-Seman
- Gradishtë
- Gungas
- Spolet
- Babunjë
