= Myqerem Tafaj =

Albanian politician

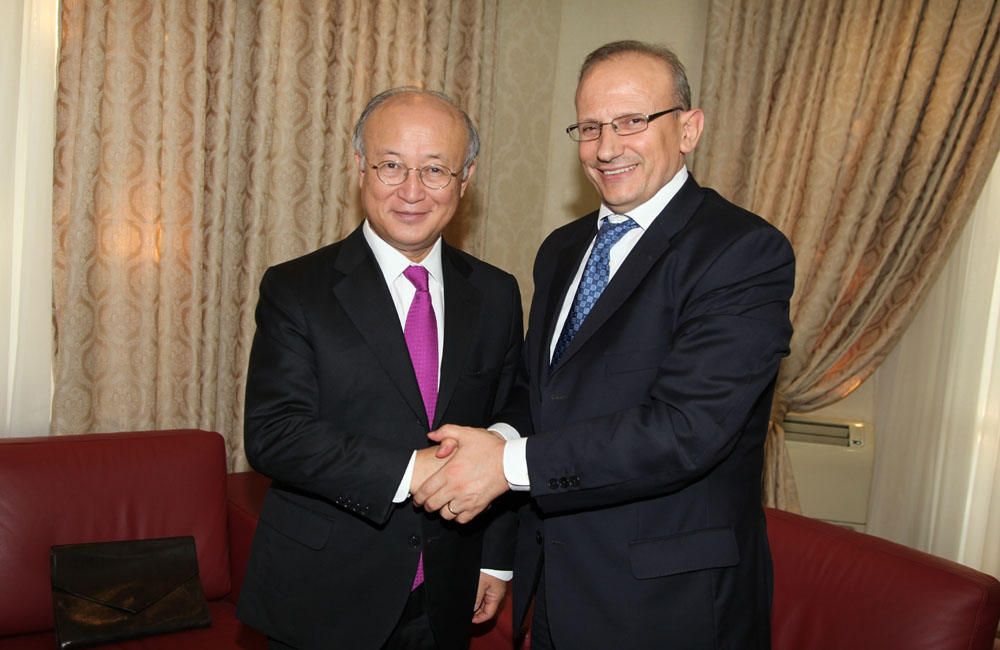

Minister of Education and Sciences of Albania
- In office 2008 – 4 April 2013
- President: Bamir Topi; Bujar Nishani
- Prime Minister: Sali Berisha
- In office March 1997 – July 1997
- President: Sali Berisha
- Prime Minister: Bashkim Fino

Personal details
- Born: November 14, 1957 (age 68) Bulqizë, Dibër, Albania
- Party: Democratic Party of Albania
- Education: Agricultural University of Tirana(B.A. and Ph.D.); University of Hohenheim(Ph.D.)

Myqerem Tafaj (born November 14, 1957) is an Albanian politician and university professor. He is a member of the Democratic Party of Albania and served as Minister of Education and Sciences in the cabinet of Sali Berisha. He was also Deputy Prime Minister from 4 April 2013 to 14 September 2013.

== Early life and career ==
Myqerem Tafaj was born in Bulqizë, Albania, on November 14, 1957. In the late 1970s, he moved to Tirana, where he began agriculture studies at the Agricultural University of Tirana. In 1988, Tafaj received his doctoral degree from the same university. Shortly after his graduation, in 1990, Tafaj was awarded a one-year fellowship from the German Foundation for International Development, which gave him the possibility to continue his research in Germany. Between 1992 and 1995, Tafaj completed his second PhD at the University of Hohenheim.

== Entry into politics ==
After he returned to Albania, in 1996, Tafaj became director of sciences at the Ministry of Education of Albania. On 12 March 1997, Tafaj was named the Minister of Education in President Sali Berisha's placeholder government. Tafaj was appointed Education Minister at the height of the country's 1997 political unrest, which had a disastrous effect on Albania's higher education system. Rioting and looting on the campuses of the University of Tirana and the Agricultural University of Tirana resulted in millions of dollars in damage. The universities were closed from March to May, and the University of Nebraska–Lincoln suspended its program in Tirana. During the closures, over four hundred squatters took residence in the dormitories on the campuses. Tafaj served as Minister until June, when elections were held. In 1999, Tafaj was awarded a fellowship from the Alexander von Humboldt Foundation, which allowed him to return to Germany and work as a visiting professor at the University of Hohenheim. Eventually, in 2005, he returned to Albania to work as a professor at the Agricultural University of Tirana and as a councilor for the Ministry of Education and Sciences. In 2009, Tafaj was appointed as Minister of Education in the cabinet of Prime Minister Sali Berisha.
