= Dushk =

- Administrative unit
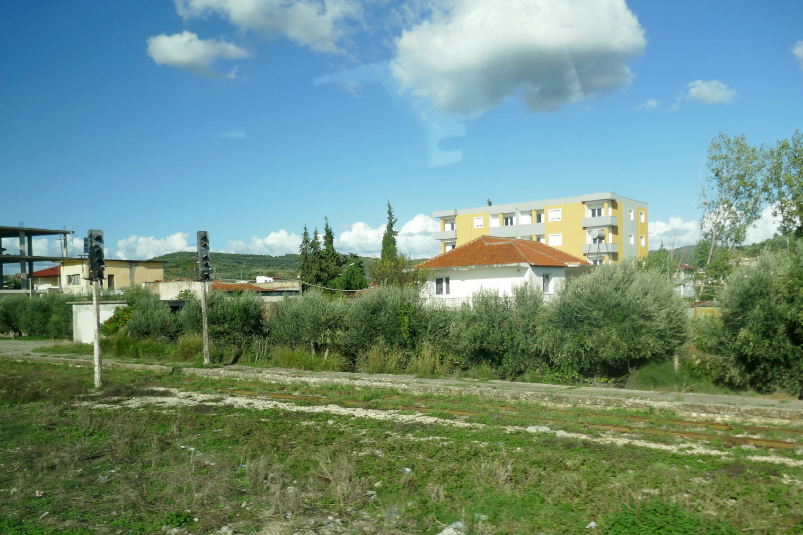
- Train station of Dushk (2024)

- Location within Albania
- Coordinates: 41°0′N 19°40′E
- Country: Albania
- County: Fier
- Municipality: Lushnjë

Population (2023)
  - Administrative unit: 5,157
- Time zone: UTC+1 (CET)
  - Summer (DST): UTC+2 (CEST)

Dushk is a former municipality in the Fier County, western Albania. At the 2015 local government reform it became a subdivision of the municipality Lushnjë. The population at the 2023 census was 5,157.

== Economy ==
The economy of Dushk is based on agriculture. There are many farms such as olive oil farms and small food processing factories. Most of the population of the subdivision have farms. There are many businesses such as cafes, bars, and shops that support the economy. There are many gas stations due to the SH4 state road passing on the side of it.
