= Karbunarë =

- Administrative unit
- Location within Albania
- Coordinates: 40°55′N 19°43′E
- Country: Albania
- County: Fier
- Municipality: Lushnjë

Population (2023)
  - Administrative unit: 2,692
- Time zone: UTC+1 (CET)
  - Summer (DST): UTC+2 (CEST)

Karbunarë (Albanian definite form: Karbunara) is a former municipality in the Fier County, western Albania. At the 2015 local government reform it became a subdivision of the municipality Lushnjë. The population at the 2023 census was 2,692.

The municipal unit has nine villages under its jurisdiction:

- Balaj
- Biçakaj
- Karbunarë e Sipërme
- Kasharaj
- Kashtbardhë
- Murriz
- Skilaj
- Stan-Karbunarë
- Zgjanë

Although Karbunara is located in the Myzeqe region where many of Albanian Orthodox backgrounds live, it is a center of the heterodox Islamic Halveti Order, which is often mistaken for (but not the same as) the Bektashi Order. The town of Karbunara contains both a Halveti tekke and a Halveti tyrbe. In addition to the numerous residents of Halveti background, there are also some of Orthodox backgrounds as well as non-Halveti Muslim backgrounds, and in modern days there are also many irreligious individuals.
