= Allkaj =

- Administrative unit
- Location within Albania
- Coordinates: 40°51′N 19°45′E
- Country: Albania
- County: Fier
- Municipality: Lushnjë

Population (2023)
  - Administrative unit: 3,043
- Time zone: UTC+1 (CET)
  - Summer (DST): UTC+2 (CEST)

Allkaj is a village and a former municipality in the Fier County, western Albania. At the 2015 local government reform it became a subdivision of the municipality Lushnjë. The population at the 2023 census was 3,043.
