= Villages of Fier County =

The Fier County in western Albania is subdivided into 6 municipalities. These municipalities contain 283 towns and villages:

velmish is a village near roskovec city
