= Halil Jaçellari =

Albanian writer and translator

- Born: 14 July 1940; Lushnje, Albania
- Died: 23 October 2009 (aged 69); Rome, Italy
- Occupations: Writer, poet, translator
- Spouse: Afërdita Hasanbelliu
- Children: Ilir Jaçellari
- Writing career
- Language: Albanian
- Genres: Novel, short story

Halil Jaçellari (14 July 1940 – 23 October 2009) was an Albanian writer and translator.

== Published works ==
- Mirë mëngjes njerëz (Good morning people), 1976, story collection
- Hapat e tij (His footsteps), 1978, story collection
- Nesër është e djelë (Tomorrow is Sunday), 1988, novel
- Nuk është kjo dashuria (This is not love), 1996, story collection
- Përralla nga Hans Christian Andersen (Tales – Hans Christian Andersen), 1996, translation
- Nick Sniffle and Dr. Yeah, 1997, translation
- Tregimet e Guy de Maupassant (Short story collection – Guy de Maupassant), 1999, translation
- Tregime (Story collection), 2002
- Sezoni pa dasma (Wedding-less season), 2005, novel
- Humnera e mëdyshjes (Abyss of ambiguity), 2009, novel
