= Fahredin Nuri =

Albanian hydraulic engineer

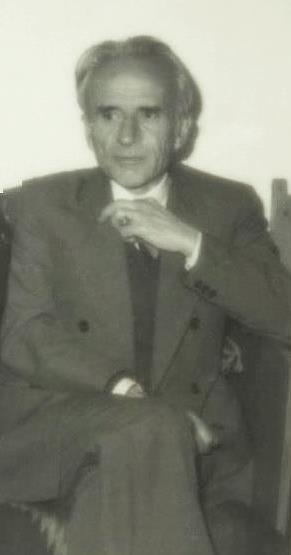
- Engineer Fahredin Nuri in his late years
- Born: 24 November 1914; Lushnja, Albania
- Died: 16 November 1984 (aged 69); Tirana Albania
- Citizenship: Albanian
- Known for: Swamp draining & Soil reclaiming, Portable water supply & Irrigation Planning, Water quality & Hydrologic processes, Drought characterization and prediction, Flood prediction & Flood forecasting, Infrastructure responses to hydrologic processes, Numerical modeling of hydrologic systems, Modeling of watersheds and river basins, Analysis of water resources systems, River network properties, Soil moisture and dynamics, Fishing economies
- Scientific career
- Fields: Physics, Mathematics, Civil Engineering, Design, Hydraulic Engineering.
- Institutions: Agricultural Ministry, Ministry of Constructions, Ministry of Food and Light Industry

Notes
- His mother was Shezo Nuri. His father was Besim Nuri.

Fahredin Nuri (24 November 1914 – 16 November 1984) was an Albanian hydraulic engineer.

== Early years ==
With his wife, Tefta Nuri

After completing the Primary studies at Lushnja with excellent results, Fahredin Nuri continued his Secondary education at the Korça’s French Lycée (Albanian – Liceu i Korçës). He completed the cycle of nine years studies in seven, mathematic branch, and obtained the Diploma in June 1934, with the motivation: Very Good and Congratulations from the Jury.

The French Government accorded Nuri the right to continue his studies at the University of Sorbonne, where he graduated in 1940 with excellent results at the Faculty of Civil Engineering (L'université Paris-Sorbonne, diplômés en génie civil).

Fahredin master work in Post-War Albania focused on Hydrologic and Hydraulic Engineering, on the movement, storage, and properties of water in the environment, as well as the interaction of water with human activities. His work reflected bright solutions to water supply and planning, irrigation systems design, water rights administration, stream restoration, environmental protection, floodplain planning and management, and drought mitigation.

== Early working years ==
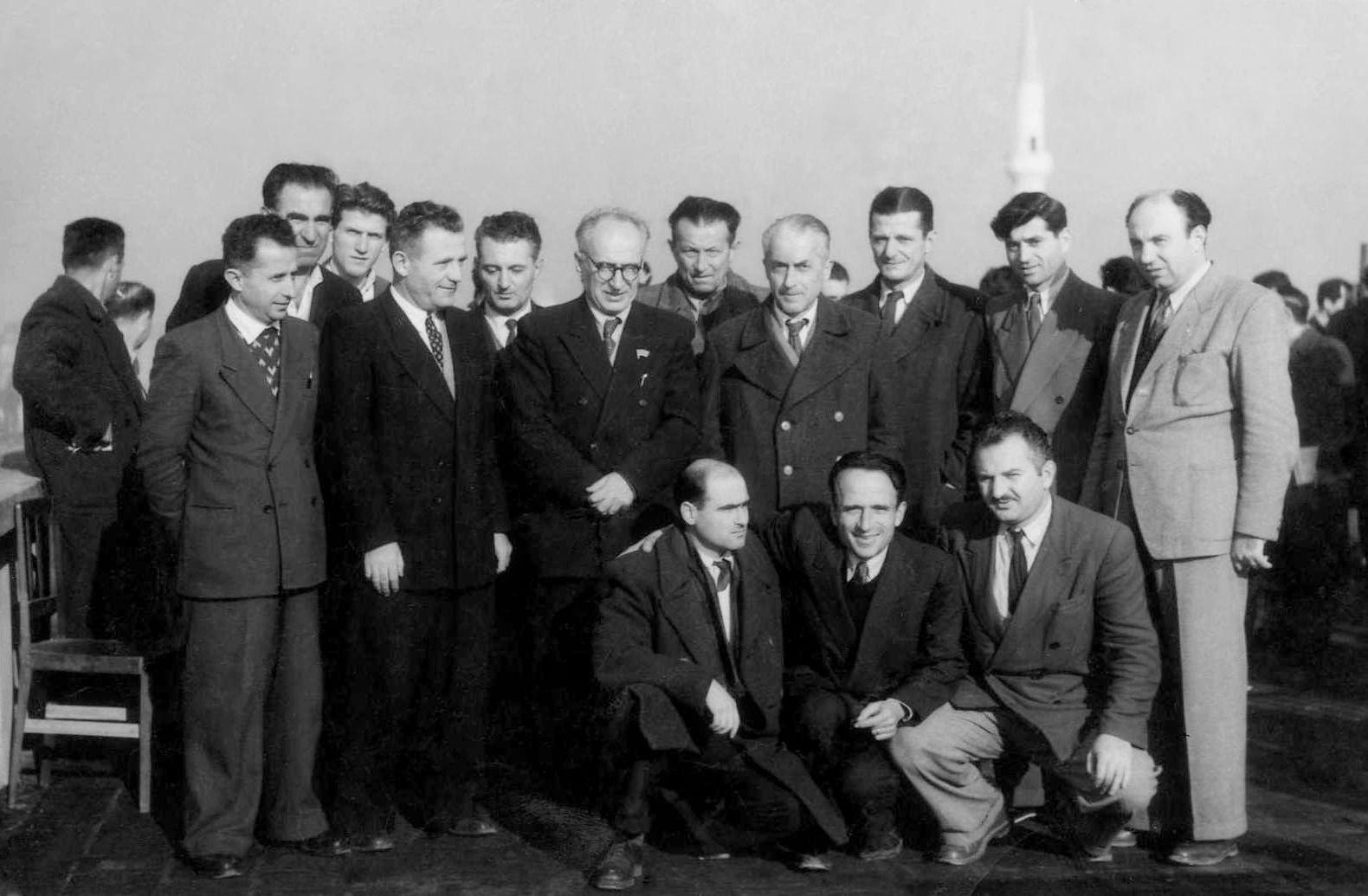
Fahredin Nuri and the elite of the Albanian Hydrologic Engineers

- In April 1946 – He took over the archive, the draining and reclaiming works for the Kavaja’s field, from Engineer De Stefanis and Mr. Sulejman Vlora.
- In February 1947 – Together with Engineer Vasil Noçka, ran the project for the Penkova Bridge.
- In March 1947 – He was assigned Master Director on a project aiming the full study of the secondary canals of the main irrigation canal Hajdara-Gostinë.

During this period he worked as Master Engineer at the Directorate of the Waters at the Forests and Agricultural Ministry and Director of the Local Water Irrigation Works Directorate. From August 1963 he worked as Master Engineer at the Draining Directorate at the Ministry of Constructions until he retired at the State Draining Design Institute.

== Master Works ==
- The Canal of Kuci’s Bridge, Berat
- The Canal of the Coast of Mata
- The Flow regime Work in Controlled Irrigation Canal of Zemblak, Korça
- The Flow regime Work of Vlashuk on Devoll River
- The Rroskovec-Hoxharë collector on Gjanica River
- The Draining and the Re-claim of the Vlora-Myzeqe Field
- The Draining and the Re-claim of 1/3 of Narta’s Lake – The construction of the Solar Salt Work of Skrofotina, Vlora
- The complete Draining and the Re-claim of Tërbufi’s Swam
- The design of Kurjani’s Dam, Fier
- The project-design of the Artificial Lake Dam, Tirana
- The project-design of the Dam of the Gogi’s Creek
- The project-design of the Irrigation Canal Vjosë-Levan-Fier
- The project-design of the Irrigation Canal Peqin-Kavajë
- The Aqueduct of the City of Elbasan
- The Aqueduct of the City of Fier
- The Aqueduct of the City of Berat
- The Aqueduct Station of Qaf-Molla
- The Aqueduct of the City of Kolonja
- The Aqueduct of the Textile Factory, Tirana
- The Aqueduct of Dropulli, Gjirokastër
- The Aqueduct of Selenica, Vlora
- The Aqueduct of the Cooper Cables Factory, Shkodra
- The Aqueduct of the City of Delvina
- The Aqueduct of Fushe-Kruja
- The Aqueduct of Gorancis
- The Aqueduct of Piqeras

== Other ==
- In 1963 together with Engineer Thoma Filipeu, Engineer Vahap Ponde and Engineer Kole Popa he designed the Water Supply System of the Textile Factory of Tirana by taking the water from Tirana’s Artificial Lake and lowering the water hardness level, a process implemented for the first time in the Albanian Hydrologic Engineering history.
- His French to Albanian translation book The American Arch-Gravity Dams is a master piece that contributed significantly to the construction of the Albanian main arch-gravity dams on the main Northern Rivers.

== National Awards ==
Moments after the Republic Order Award

- On 15 March 1965 – Engineer Fahredin Nuri is awarded the Scientific Title of Candidate of Sciences.
- On 19 July 1972 - Engineer Fahredin Nuri is awarded the title: Old Scientific Fellow Master.
- On 7 November 1952 - Engineer Fahredin Nuri is awarded the Civic Work Order Class III – with the motivation – Excellent performance in Draining Engineering.
- On 25 April 1955 - Engineer Fahredin Nuri is awarded the Civic Work Order Class III - for the project-design of the Irrigation Canal Vjosë-Levan-Fier.

== Legacy ==
The works designed by Fahredin Nuri, including swamp draining and soil reclaiming, portable water supply and irrigation planning, water quality and hydrologic processes, drought characterization and prediction, flood prediction and flood forecasting, infrastructure responses to hydrologic processes, numerical modeling of hydrologic systems, modeling of watersheds and river basins, analysis of water resources systems, river network properties, soil moisture and dynamics, fishing economies or solar salt works are thought to be more than 120. After being in use for more than 45 years, the irrigation canal Peqin–Kavajë has been reconstructed and is still being used for irrigation. Future projects foresee its use on the field of hydroelectricity in the framework of the Banja Hydropower Plant, as his dream and vision was. The Irrigation Canal Vjosë-Levan-Fier was a Work of unique and extraordinary dimensions for the time it was designed, far in 1955. Numerous were the practical problems resolved like river’s hydrology, river network properties, topography and constructions.

== Later years ==
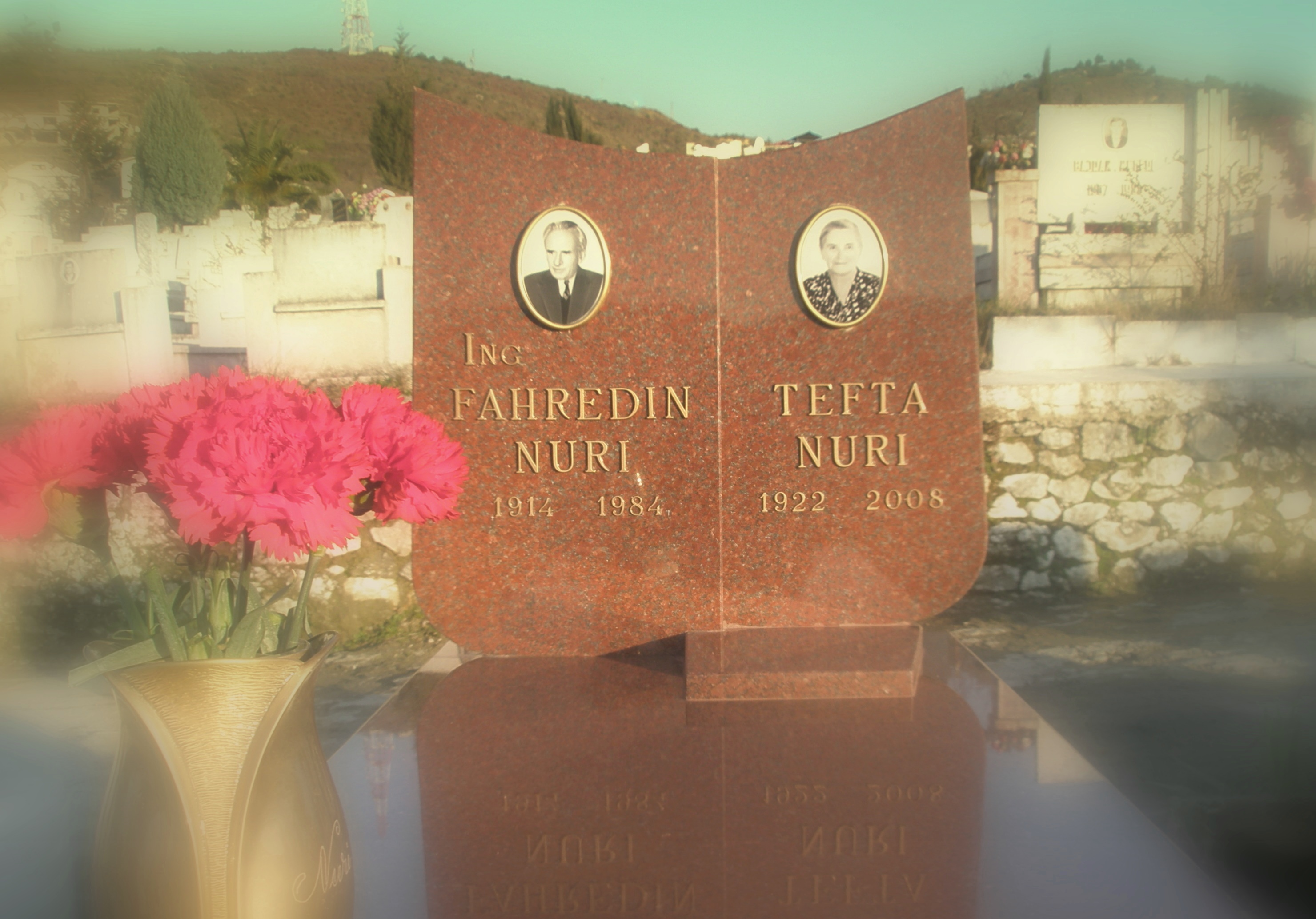
Fahredin Nuri's grave in Tirana's cemetery

Engineer Fahredin Nuri was put into retirement against his will in 1974. After that, he gave his contribution to the Roads-Bridge Institute and the Directorate of Fish Farming and Fishing Techniques Designs of the Ministry of Food and Light Industry. In 1981 Engineer Fahredin Nuri started to have his first eyesight problems. The attempt of his family to ensure him a more professional medical treatment abroad was met by indifference and dismiss from the Communist Albanian authorities.

Fahredin Nuri died on 16 November 1984.

His contribution to Albanian Hydrologic Engineering is significant and unique. Many refer to him as the Master of the Agricultural Hydrologic Engineering Science in Albania.
