= Niko Qafzezi =

Albanian pedagogue

- Born: October 26, 1914; Korçë, Albania
- Died: November 30, 1998 (aged 84); Tirana, Albania
- Education: Faculty of Agriculture, Perugia/Italia
- Occupation: Agronomist
- Years active: 1945–1998
- Known for: Head of Agriculture Production in Ministry of Agriculture/Albania
- Notable work: Dictionary of Agriculture

Niko Qafzezi (October 26, 1914 – November 30, 1998) was an Albanian agronomist and pedagogue.

Qafzezi was the author of many textbooks of the Faculty of Agronomy as "Fitoteknia" I and II, and Books "The culture of cotton." He drew published several scientific articles in the field of agriculture in Albanian and foreign periodicals, as the "Dictionary of Agriculture" in four languages: English, Latin, Italian and Russian.
