= Egzon Shimaj =

Albanian footballer

Personal information
- Date of birth: 27 February 2001 (age 25)
- Place of birth: Shkodër, Albania
- Height: 1.81 m (5 ft 11 in)
- Position: Centre-back

Youth career
- 2014–2019: Vllaznia Shkodër

Senior career*
| Years | Team | Apps | (Gls) |
| 2019–2021 | Besa Kavajë | 35 | (1) |
| 2021–2022 | Vllaznia Shkodër | 0 | (0) |

International career
| 2017 | Albania U17 | 3 | (0) |
| 2019 | Albania U19 | 2 | (0) |
- * Club domestic league appearances and goals as of 14 May 2022

Egzon Shimaj (born 27 February 2001) is an Albanian professional footballer who plays as a centre-back.
