= Ilir Jaçellari =

Albanian actor, painter and photographer

Ilir Jacellari
- Born: 7 July 1970 (age 56); Lushnje, Albania
- Occupations: Actor, writer, painter, photographer
- Known for: ACAB – All Cops Are Bastards
- Parent(s): Halil Jaçellari (father), Afërdita Hasanbelliu (mother)

Ilir Jaçellari is an Albanian actor, painter and photographer. Ilir is best known for his roles in ACAB – All Cops Are Bastards and Balancing Act.

== Biography ==
Ilir Jaçellari was born in Lushnje, Albania on 7 July 1970. His first studies were in painting and acting with teaching personalities such as Faslli Haliti and Gjergj Lala. His first shows were presented in his city of birth. Ilir is son of famous Albanian writer Halil Jaçellari.

== Filmography ==
Year	Film	Character
2005	L'orizzonte degli eventi	Scagnozzo
2006	La squadra (TV Series)	Ismail Vorpsi
2005–2007	Rome (TV Series)	Solder
2007	L'uomo della carità	Uomo Albanese
2007	Il capitano (TV Series)	Killer Slavo
2008	Questa è la mia terra vent'anni dopo (TV Series)	Scagnozzo
2009	Alma	
2010	The Last in Paradise (TV Movie)	Mariano
2010	Donna detective (TV Series)	Misha
2011	Eclissi di fine stagione (Short)	
2011	Dov'è mia figlia? (TV Series)	Nomade
2012	ACAB – All Cops Are Bastards	Molestatore al parco
2012	Ti stimo fratello	Ladro di macchina
2012	Balancing Act	Senzatetto ubriaco
2014	Un medico in famiglia (TV Series)	Cristian
2014	Il commissario Rex (TV Series)	Guardaspalle "Albanian Boss"
2014	L'Oriana (TV Movie)	Greek Officer
2015	Canile (Short movie)	Operaio
2019	Imma Tataranni: Deputy Prosecutor (Italian TV Series)	Nikolaus
2022	Monterossi - La Serie (Amazon Original TV Series)	Clinton
