= Kolonjë, Fier =

Kolonjë
- Administrative unit
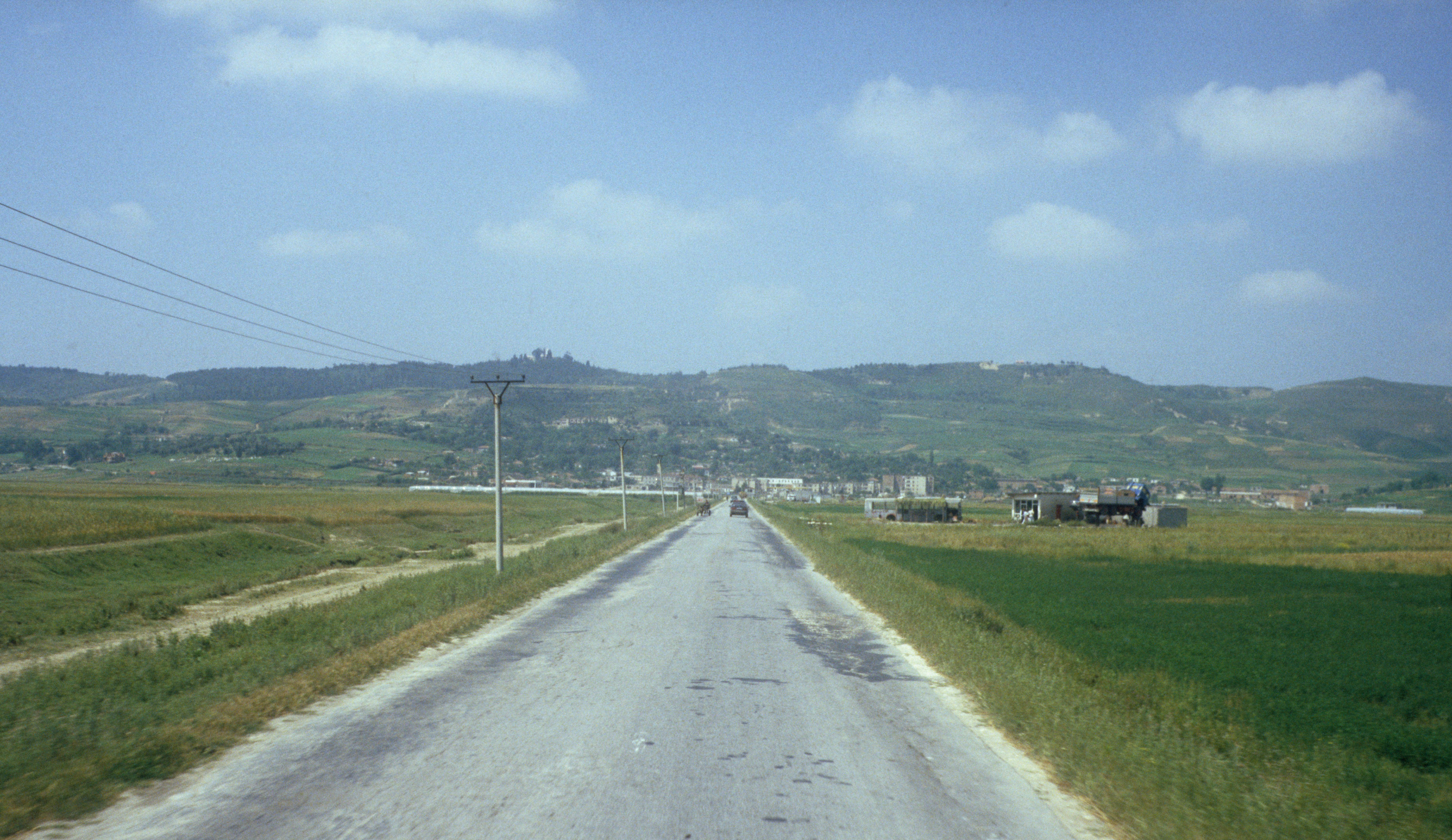
- The village of Kolonjë, Fier

- Location within Albania
- Coordinates: 40°50′N 19°36′E
- Country: Albania
- County: Fier
- Municipality: Lushnjë

Population (2023)
  - Administrative unit: 4,147
- Time zone: UTC+1 (CET)
  - Summer (DST): UTC+2 (CEST)
- Postal Code: 9007

Kolonjë is a town and a former municipality in the Fier County, western Albania. At the 2015 local government reform it became a subdivision of the municipality Lushnjë. The population at the 2011 census was 5,728.

== Landmarks ==
- Ardenica Monastery
