= Krutje =

- Administrative unit
- Location within Albania
- Coordinates: 40°52′N 19°41′E
- Country: Albania
- County: Fier
- Municipality: Lushnjë

Population (2023)
  - Administrative unit: 5,523
- Time zone: UTC+1 (CET)
  - Summer (DST): UTC+2 (CEST)

Krutje is a former municipality in the Fier County, western Albania. At the 2015 local government reform it became a subdivision of the municipality Lushnjë. The population at the 2023 census was 5,523.

It is especially famous in Albania as the site of the first collective communist farm, the famous cooperatives. The municipality was especially prosperous during communism with its own volleyball team that used to win national championships and represent Albania in the world. It had its own bookshop and a big cinema. The big high school with more than 400 students and a big greenhouse are today in service, but less prominent and challenged by other developments in neighboring municipalities.
