= Tërbuf =

- Administrative unit
- Location within Albania
- Coordinates: 41°2′N 19°37′E
- Country: Albania
- County: Fier
- Municipality: Divjakë

Population (2011)
  - Administrative unit: 10,201
- Time zone: UTC+1 (CET)
  - Summer (DST): UTC+2 (CEST)

Tërbuf is a village and a former municipality in Fier County, western Albania. At the 2015 local government reform it became a subdivision of the municipality Divjakë.

== Geography ==
Tërbuf sits in Northern Fier County, next to the border with the neighbouring Tirana County. It is located next to the former Tërbuf Marsh, considered the lowest point of Albania at -7 meters.

== Population ==
The population at the 2011 census was 10,201.

== In media ==
In The Man from U.N.C.L.E. episode "The Terbuf Affair", Terbuf is a fictional Balkan country loosely identified with Albania. The character Illya Kuryakin refers to it as "the land of the eagle". This is the popular translation of Shqiperia, the word for Albania in the Albanian language.

== Notable people ==
- Besim Restelica, Albanian American Economist
