= Albanian Institute of Agricultural Research =

- Instituti Shqiptar i Kërkimeve Bujqësore

Agency overview
- Formed: 1951
- Jurisdiction: Government of Albania
- Headquarters: Tirana, Albania
- Parent department: Ministry of Agriculture and Rural Development

The Albanian Institute of Agricultural Research (Albanian: Instituti i Kërkimeve Shkencore Bujqësore "Ivan Miçurin", or shortly Albanian: Instituti i Kërkimeve Bujqësore) was a scientific research institute that operated from 1948 to 2006.

== History ==
The Institute of Agricultural Research was created in Laprakë, Albania, in 1948, and was then called Stacioni Eksperimental Bujqesor (transl. Agricultural Experimental Facility). In 1950 it was renamed to Stacioni i Kerkimeve Bujqesore (transl. Agricultural Scientific Facility). On 7 December 1952 it was renamed again into Instituti i Kerkimeve Shkencore Bujqesore (transl. Institute of Agricultural Scientific Research). In 1956 the institute was transferred into new facilities in Lushnjë, southern Albania. Its mission was the research and experimentation in the agricultural field, the study of the agricultural crops, and their fitosanitary situation, as well as the development of pedology studies on government owned farm lands. The institute was named after Ivan Vladimirovich Michurin.

In 2006 the institute was dissolved by law (government decree Nr. 515, as of 19 July 2006) as a nationwide reorganization occurred, following which new scientific institutions (called Transfer Centers of Agricultural Technology (Albanian: Qendra e Transferimit të Teknologjive Bujqësore)) were created.
