= Divjakë =

Municipality in Albania

Divjakë (Albanian: [ˈdivˈjakə]; Albanian definite form: Divjaka) is a municipality and town in Fier County, Albania. The municipality consists of the administrative units of Grabian, Gradishtë, Remas, Tërbuf with Divjakë constituting its seat. As of an estimate by The Institute of Statistics based on the 2011 Census, there were 8,445 people residing in Divjakë and 34,254 in Divjakë Municipality.

== Geography ==
Divjakë is located near the Adriatic Sea coast, in the Myzeqe plain. The area of the municipality is 309.58 km^{2}.

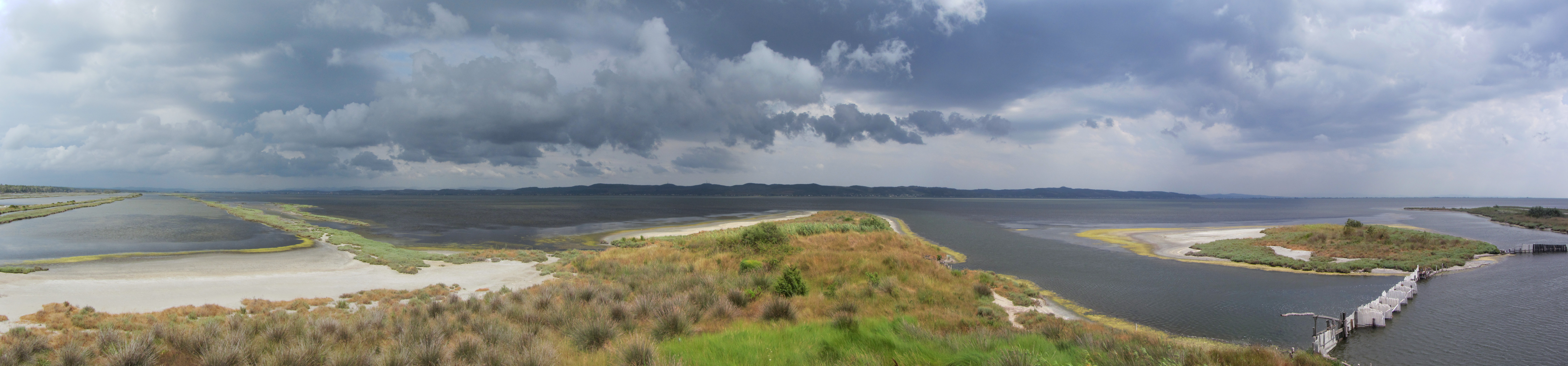
A panoramic view of Divjakë-Karavasta National Park.

== Demography ==
According to the 2011 Albanian census, 84.16% of Divjakë's residents were ethnic Albanian. Aromanians form the second largest ethnic community, with 2.12% declaring themselves Vlach, that is, Aromanian.

== Municipal Council ==
Seat distribution in the Municipal Council

Following the 2023 local elections, the composition of the Council of Divjakë is as follows:

Name	Abbr.	Seats
Socialist Party of Albania; Partia Socialiste e Shqipërisë	PS	18
Together We Win; Bashkë Fitojmë	BF	5
Democratic Party of Albania; Partia Demokratike e Shqipërisë	PD	4
Social Democratic Party of Albania; Partia Socialdemokrate e Shqipërisë	PSD	1
Republican Party of Albania; Partia Republikane e Shqipërisë	PR	1
Environmentalist Agrarian Party; Partia Agrare Ambientaliste	AAP	1
Legality Movement Party; Lëvizja e Legalitetit	PLL	1
