= Lushnjë =

City in Albania

- Municipality
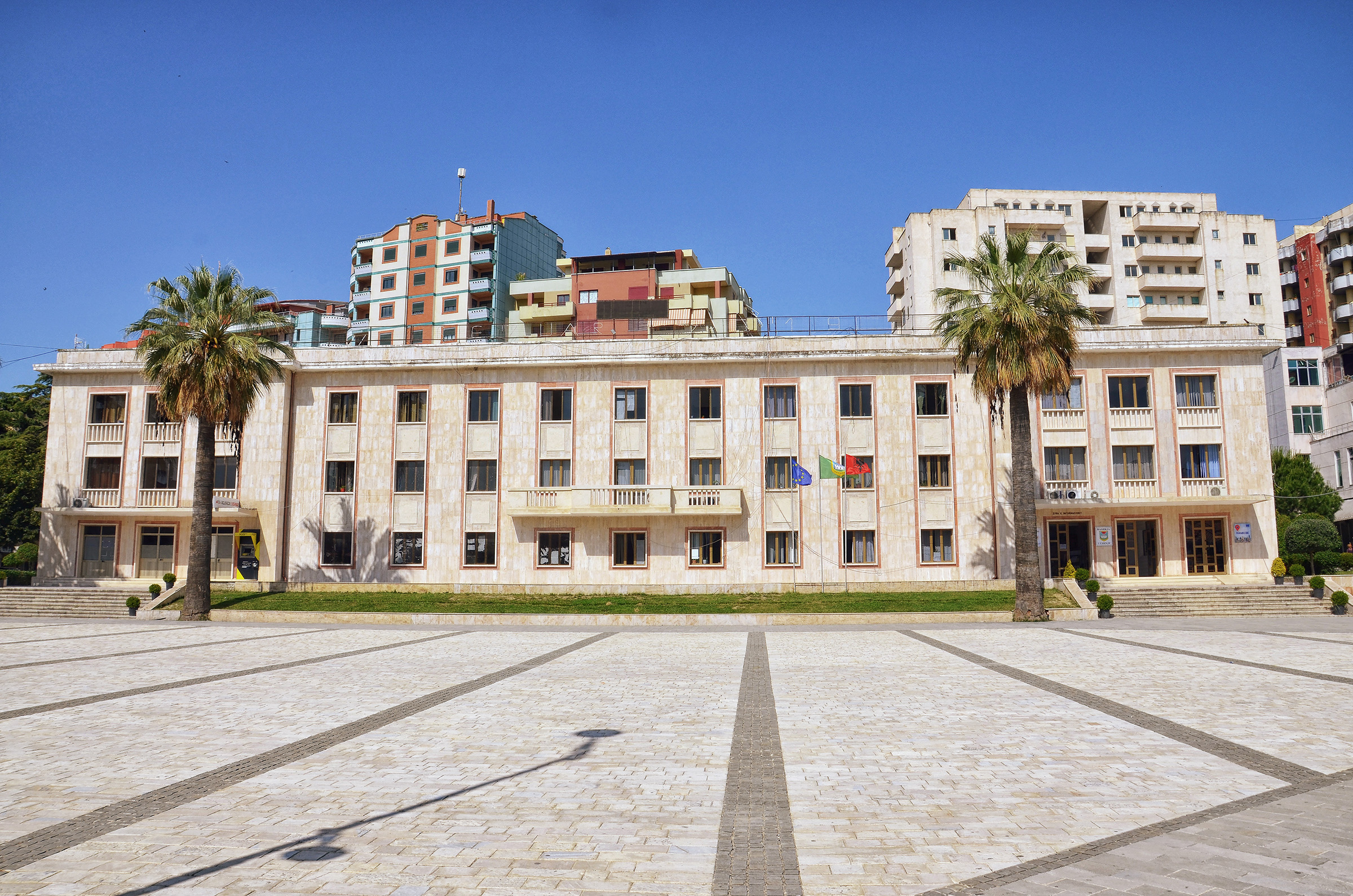
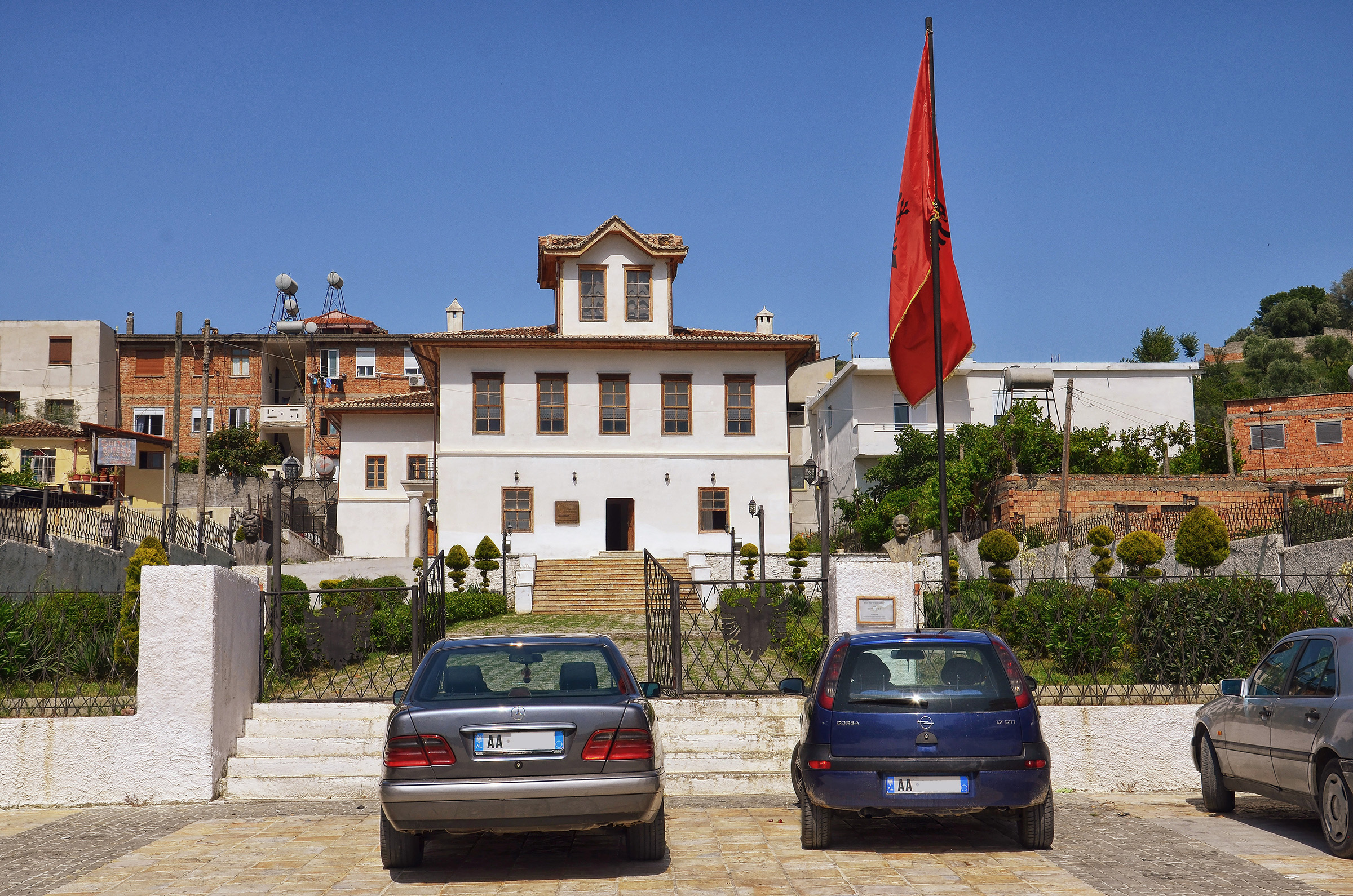
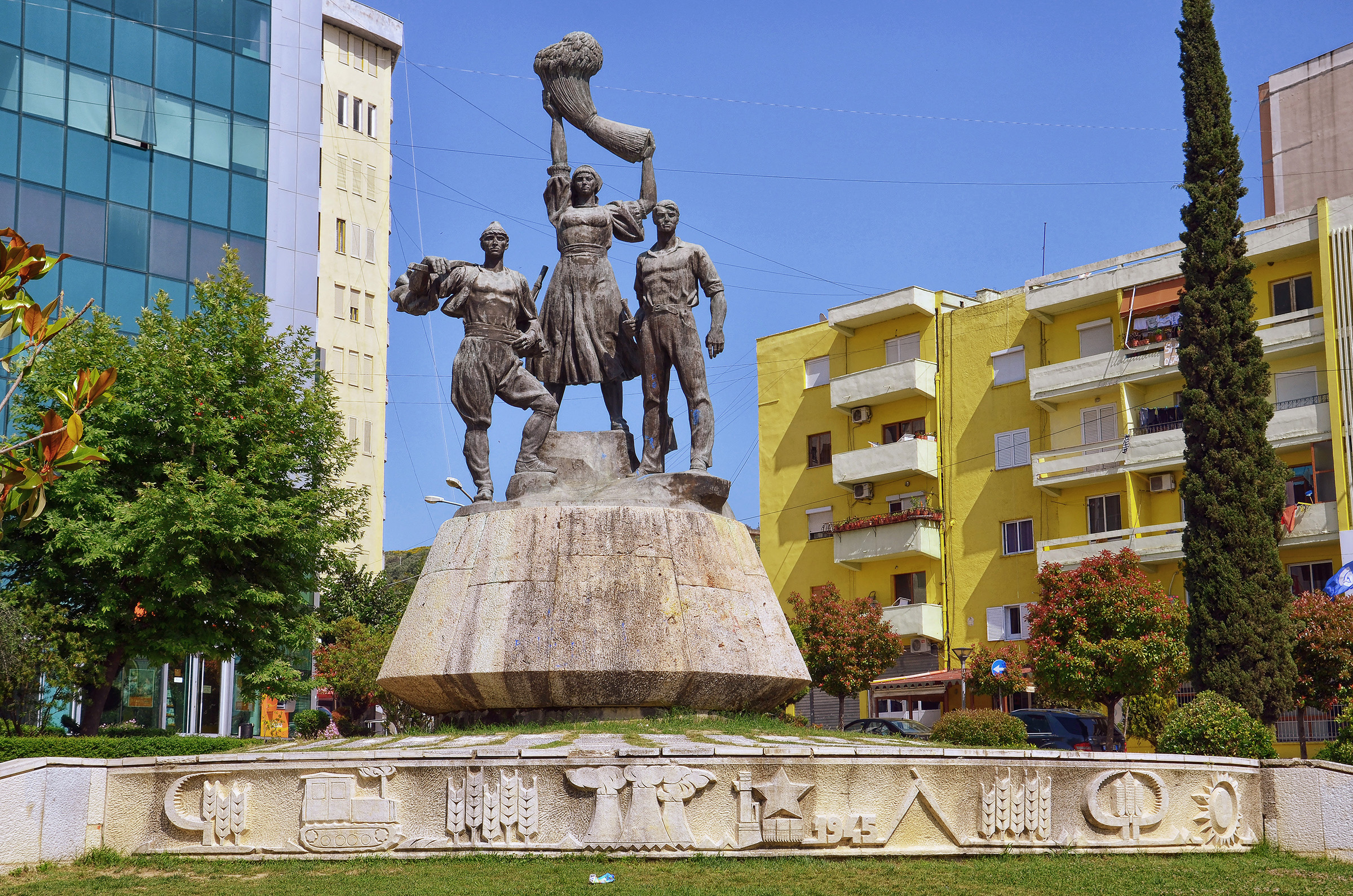
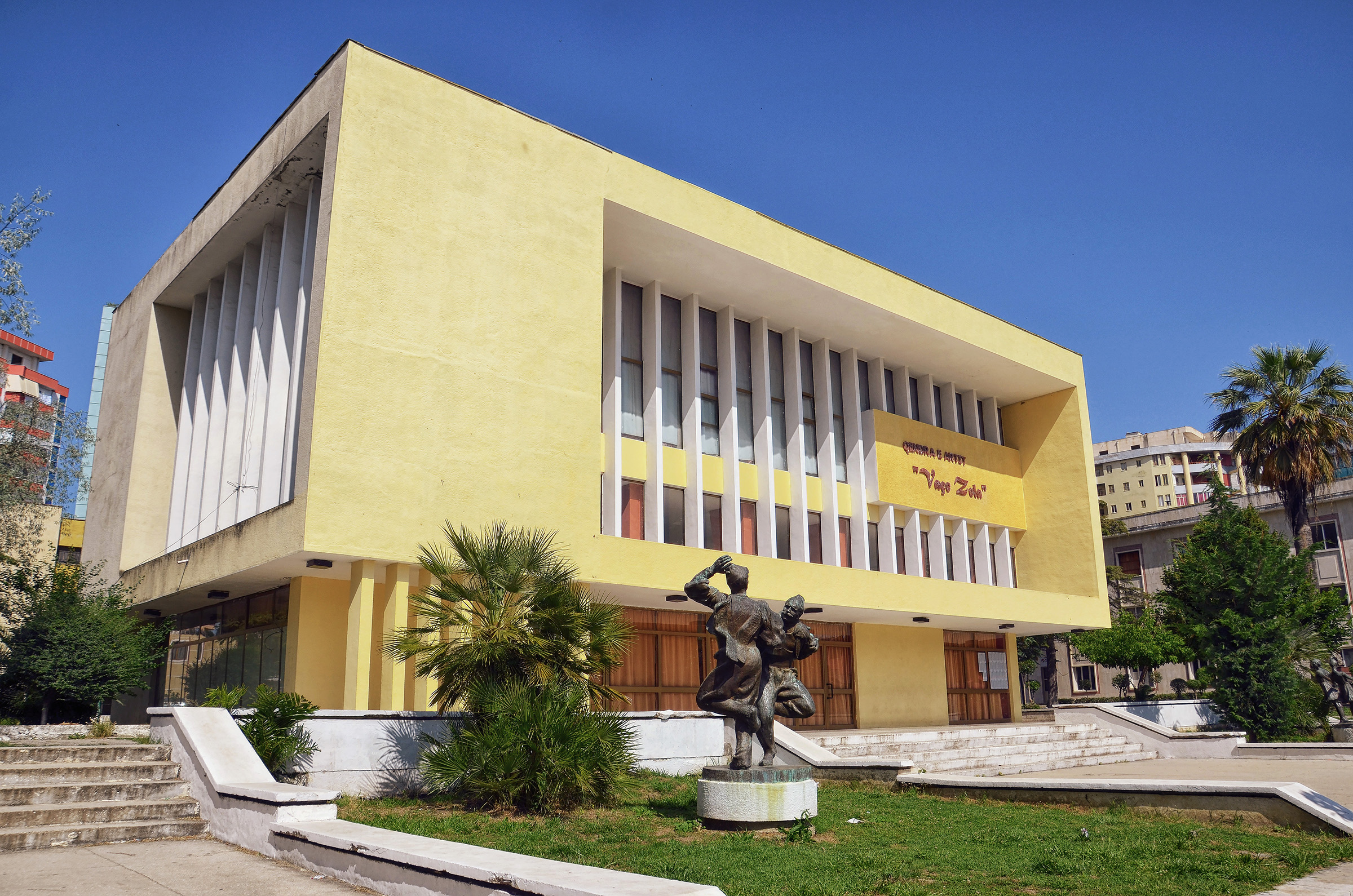
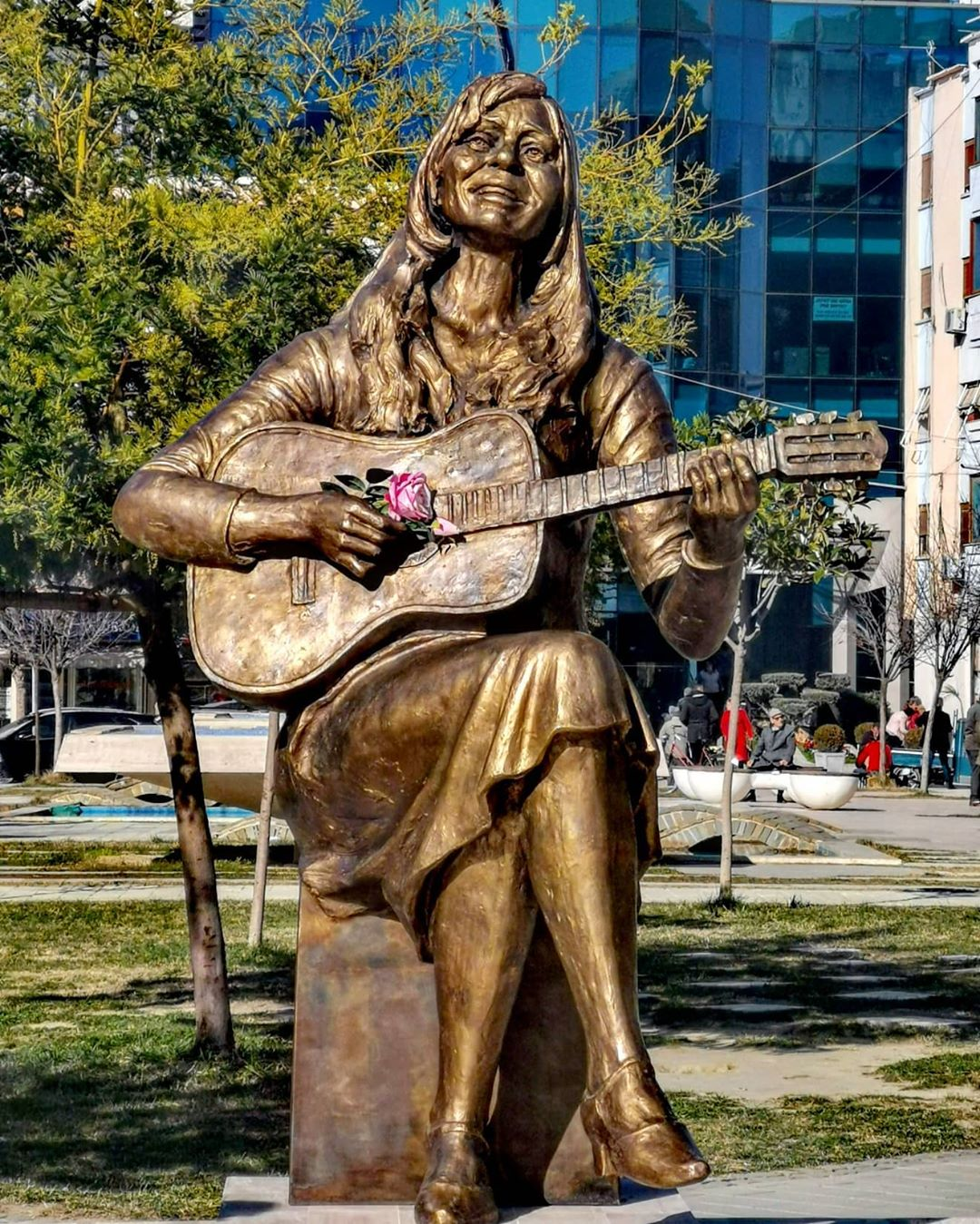
- From the top, Lushnjë Town hall, Congress of Lushnjë Museum, Toka Jonë monument on the Main square, Lushnjë Arts Centre, Vaçe Zela statue

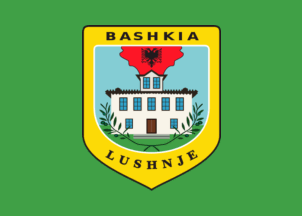
- Flag Emblem

- Location within Albania
- Coordinates: 40°56′N 19°42′E
- Country: Albania
- County: Fier

Government
  - Mayor: Eriselda Sefa (PS)
  - Council chairman: Erjet Dhima (PS)

Area
  - Municipality: 372.9 km^{2} (144.0 sq mi)
  - Administrative unit: 50.29 km^{2} (19.42 sq mi)
- Elevation: 9 m (30 ft)

Population (2023)
  - Municipality: 63,135
  - Municipality density: 169.3/km^{2} (438.5/sq mi)
  - Administrative unit: 26,036
  - Administrative unit density: 517.7/km^{2} (1,341/sq mi)
- Demonym(s): Albanian: Lushnjar (m), Lushnjare (f)
- Time zone: UTC+1 (CET)
  - Summer (DST): UTC+2 (CEST)
- Postal Code: 9001
- Area Code: (0)35
- Website: bashkialushnje.gov.al

Lushnjë (Albanian pronunciation: [ˈluʃɲə]; locally Lushnje [ˈluʃɲe]; Albanian definite form: Lushnja) is a city and municipality in west-central Albania. The municipality's population is 63,135 as of the 2023 census, in a total area of 372.9 km^{2} (144.0 sq mi).

== History ==
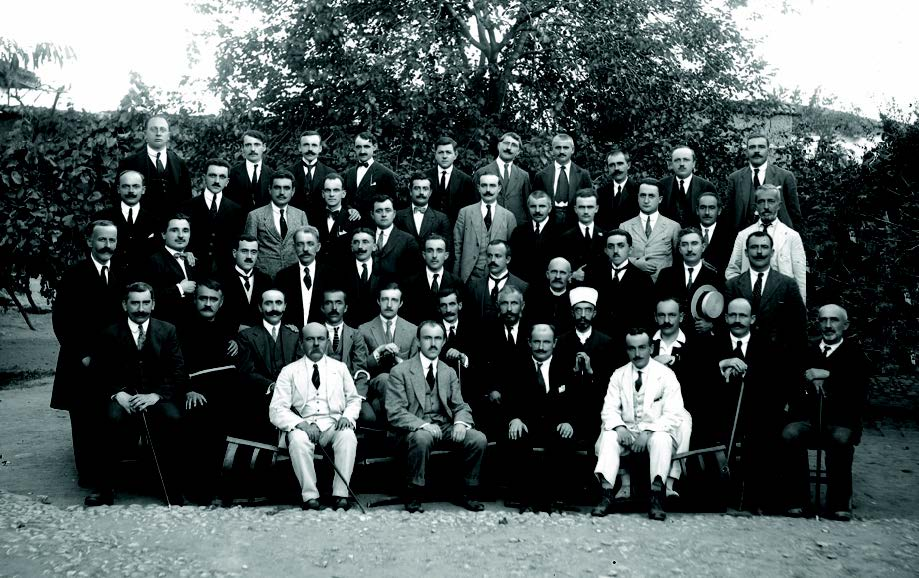

The first mention of Lushnjë comes from the 1431-1432 defter (cadastral survey) of the Sanjak of Albania. There, in the list of settlements of the Muzakiye nahiye the modern-day city is recorded as Luşnye.

Lushnjë was a provisional capital of Albania when the Congress of Lushnjë met there from 21 to 31 January in 1920. Chieftains of Albania assembled in the town and declared Tirana first a provisional and then the definitive capital of Albania.

3 km away from Lushnjë is the Savra field. This field is on the Lushnjë-Fier road. Here the first battle between the Principality of Zeta and the Principality of Albania, backed by the Ottoman Empire occurred in 1385 (the Battle of Savra). In this battle Balsha II, the Lord of Lower Zeta from 1378 to 1385, was killed.

Along with Fier, Lushnjë was the main district of the concentration camps during the Communist Regime; the camps included the villages of Savër, Gradishtë, Bedat, Gjazë, Rrapëz, and Plug.

== Geography ==
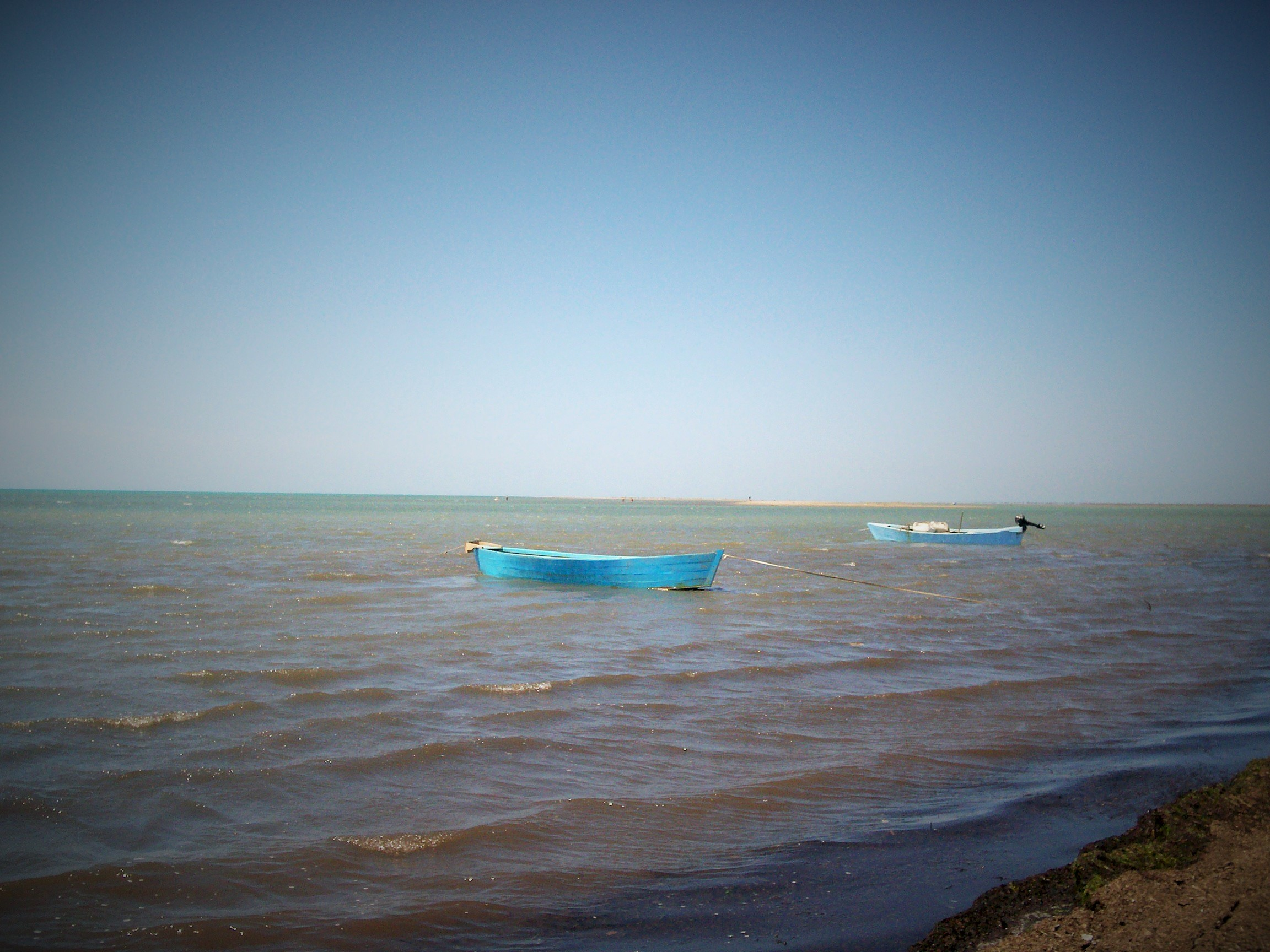
Divjake Karavasta National Park

Lushnjë is located in the middle plains and flatland in a hot Mediterranean summer type of climate. This land is used for growing crops and raising animals. It is 30 km to Divjakë-Karavasta National Park with wetland and beaches and a lagoon. There is a reservoir in a village in Kashar, Lushnjë with many farmlands around it and a connecting canal known as Perrio. Lushnjë also has many olive oil trees and is one of the leading olive oil-producing places in Albania.

=== Subdivisions ===
Subdivisions are Allkaj, Ballagat, Bubullimë, Dushk, Fier-Shegan, Golem, Hysgjokaj, Karbunarë, Kolonjë, Krutje, and Lushnjë.

== Economy ==
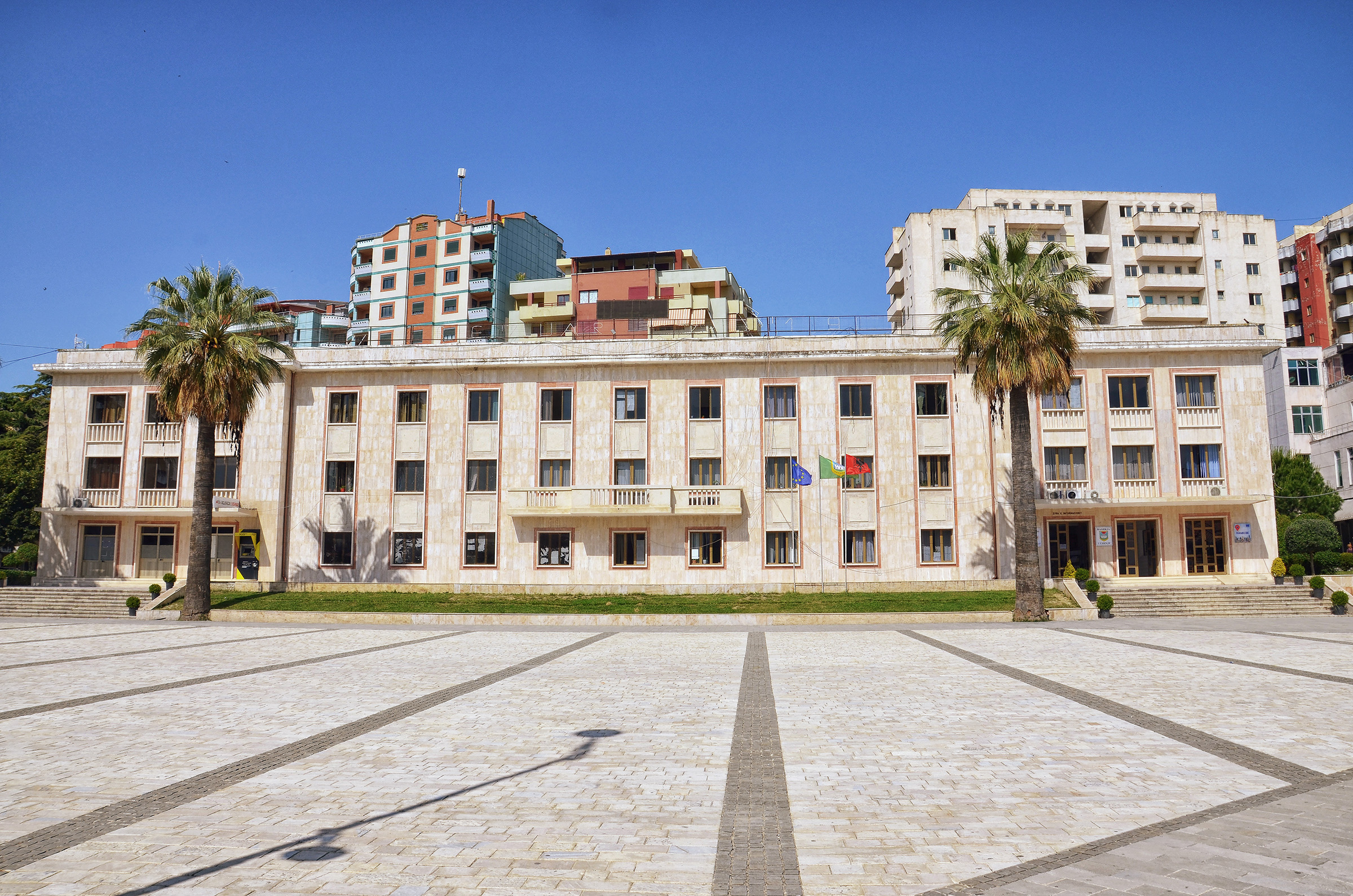
Lushnjë Town Hall

Lushnjë is located in the Myzeqe region that is known as a main provider of agricultural products to the rest of the country and for exports to other European countries, and home to a national Institute of Agricultural Research. During the Communism regime, the city had factories for paper, plastic, and food processing. Lushnjë has many olive trees. Many other business involve brick making and marble and also oil distributors and small oil refinery for gas station in and out of the city for the city.

== Infrastructure ==
=== Education ===
Lushnjë has many schools from college and to pre-k. The biggest and most famous schools in Lushnjë are known as "Skënder Libohova", "18 Tetori" and "Kongresi i Lushnjes". "Kongresi i Lushnjes" has been renovated and is one for the most modern schools in the city with painted sides and interior upgrades. The college that is situated in Lushnjë is Institute of Agricultural Research Lushnje about agriculture research. "Foto Puka" is another school in the city that is the second largest one. There are two high schools, one is "18 Tetori" and the other being "Vath Koreshi". The city also has a Professional Public High School, "Hasan D. Gina", with special curriculums raising from informatics to auto-services.

The schools of Lushnjë offer a lot of recreation for their students. "Skënder Libohova" school has a new multi-functional park and a basketball and soccer area. "Foto Puka" and "Jani Nushi" are more known for their soccer and volleyball respectively.

=== Transportation ===
There is one highway that passes by the outskirts of Lushnjë known as the SH4. The SH4 comes from Durrës to Lushnjë, and then to Fier.

There are urban buses through the city with only one straight route. The urban bus goes from the roundabout in Plug, Lushnjë, through Lushnjë, and to Karbunarë, Lushnjë. The ride is about 5 km and 13 minutes or less. There are buses available at the train station which can take you from Lushnjë to Greece and many places in the country and Balkan region.

Due to the shutdown of trains in Albania during 1990 there have been no signs of trains.

== Demographics ==
Historical population
Year	Pop.	±%
1950	5,667	—
1960	12,529	+121.1%
1969	18,100	+44.5%
1979	22,000	+21.5%
1989	32,659	+48.4%
2001	37,860	+15.9%
2011	31,105	−17.8%
2023	26,036	−16.3%

Like most southern Albanian regions, the people of Lushnjë speak a Tosk dialect. The population is mixed Orthodox and Muslim, typical of southern Albanian cities. Data from the 1918 census shows that the population of Lushnjë was split almost evenly between Muslims and Christians at the time of independence from the Ottoman Empire.

=== Sport ===
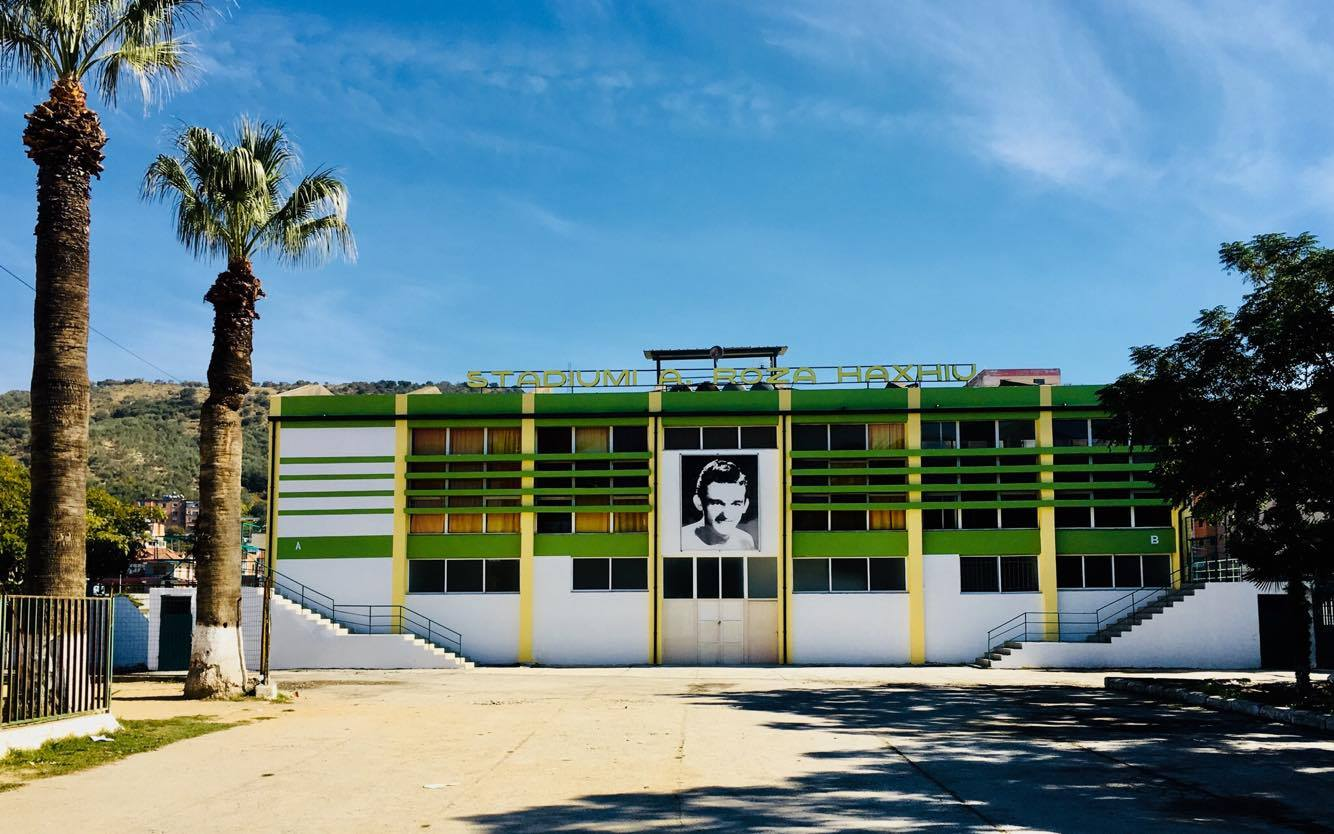
A. Roza Haxhiu Stadium

KS Lushnja was originally formed in 1927 and the first football game held in the city of Lushnjë was played shortly after. This was a friendly game against FK Tomori Berat and the team consisted of young men from Lushnjë. The club was named Kongresi i Lushnjës following a proposal from a member of parliament and signatory of the Albanian Declaration of Independence Ferit Vokopola to name the club after the Congress of Lushnjë, which was where Vokopola himself was elected secretary. In 1927 a young man named Ali Fuga returned from his studies in Austria and joined the club as a player and the head coach. He returned to Albania from Austria with shirts that would be used by the club, and they had green vertical stripes which were used to symbolise the fields of Myzeqe. Although the club was formed on 21 January 1927 it was not "officially" formed until 27 July 1930 shortly after the formation of the Albanian Football Association a month earlier. It was known then as the Kongresi i Lushnjës literacy-artistic society. The club's first official jerseys were green, and the first sports chief of the club was Ali Fuga, who had been a key member of the club's pre-formation years.

In 1945 they changed their name to KS Traktori Lushnja followed by a further name change in 1950 to SK Lushnja. In 1951 it was changed to Puna Lushnja, before they returned to KS Traktori Lushnja in 1958. In 1991 the club was named KF Lushnja.

The club's main supporters' group is called the Ultras Delegatët. Lushnje has their own volleyball team known as Ekipi i Volejbollit të Lushnjes.

=== Landmarks ===
- Abdurrahman Roza Haxhiu Stadium
- Congress of Lushnjë Museum
- Ardenica Monastery

== Twin towns – sister cities ==
- Brindisi, Italy

== Municipal Council ==
Seat distribution in the Municipal Council

Following the 2023 local elections, the composition of the Council of Lushnjë is as follows:

Name	Abbr.	Seats
Socialist Party of Albania; Partia Socialiste e Shqipërisë	PS	24
Together We Win; Bashkë Fitojmë	BF	7
Democratic Party of Albania; Partia Demokratike e Shqipërisë	PD	4
Social Democratic Party of Albania; Partia Socialdemokrate e Shqipërisë	PSD	2
Party for Justice, Integration and Unity; Partia Drejtësi, Integrim dhe Unitet	PDIU	1
Republican Party of Albania; Partia Republikane e Shqipërisë	PR	1
Environmentalist Agrarian Party; Partia Agrare Ambientaliste	AAP	1
Legality Movement Party; Lëvizja e Legalitetit	PLL	1

== Notable people ==
Following is a list of notable people born in Lushnjë, or who spent most of their lives in the city:

- Lindita Arapi - poet, writer
- Artan Bano - footballer and manager
- Luli Bitri - actor
- Iljaz Çeço - footballer
- Rezart Dabulla - footballer
- Edmond Dalipi - footballer
- Kristaq Dhamo - movie director
- Elini Dimoutsos (Greek: Ελίνι Δημούτσος; born 18 June 1988) - Greek professional footballer who plays as a midfielder
- Ilir Jaçellari - Albanian actor, painter and photographer, known for roles in ACAB – All Cops Are Bastards and Balancing Act
- Vath Koreshi - Writer
- Saimir Malko - footballer and manager
- Rey Manaj - footballer
- Florian Marku - boxer
- Migen Memelli (born 25 April 1980) - Albanian professional football coach and former player
- Fahredin Nuri - engineer
- Fatjon Fatmir Sefa (born 23 July 1984) - Albanian professional footballer who played as a forward for Lushnja in the Albanian Superliga
- Nebi Efendi Sefa - one of the founding fathers of modern Albania, signed the declaration of independence in 1912
- Ferit bej Vokopola - one of the founding fathers of modern Albania, signed the declaration of independence in 1912
- Margarita Xhepa - actress
- Alban Skënderaj - singer, songwriter, actor, producer and television personality
- Vaçe Zela - singer
- Kastro Zizo - musician

== See also ==
- Balsha II
- Battle of Savra
