= Fier County =

County in southern Albania

Fier County Qarku i Fierit (Albanian)
- County
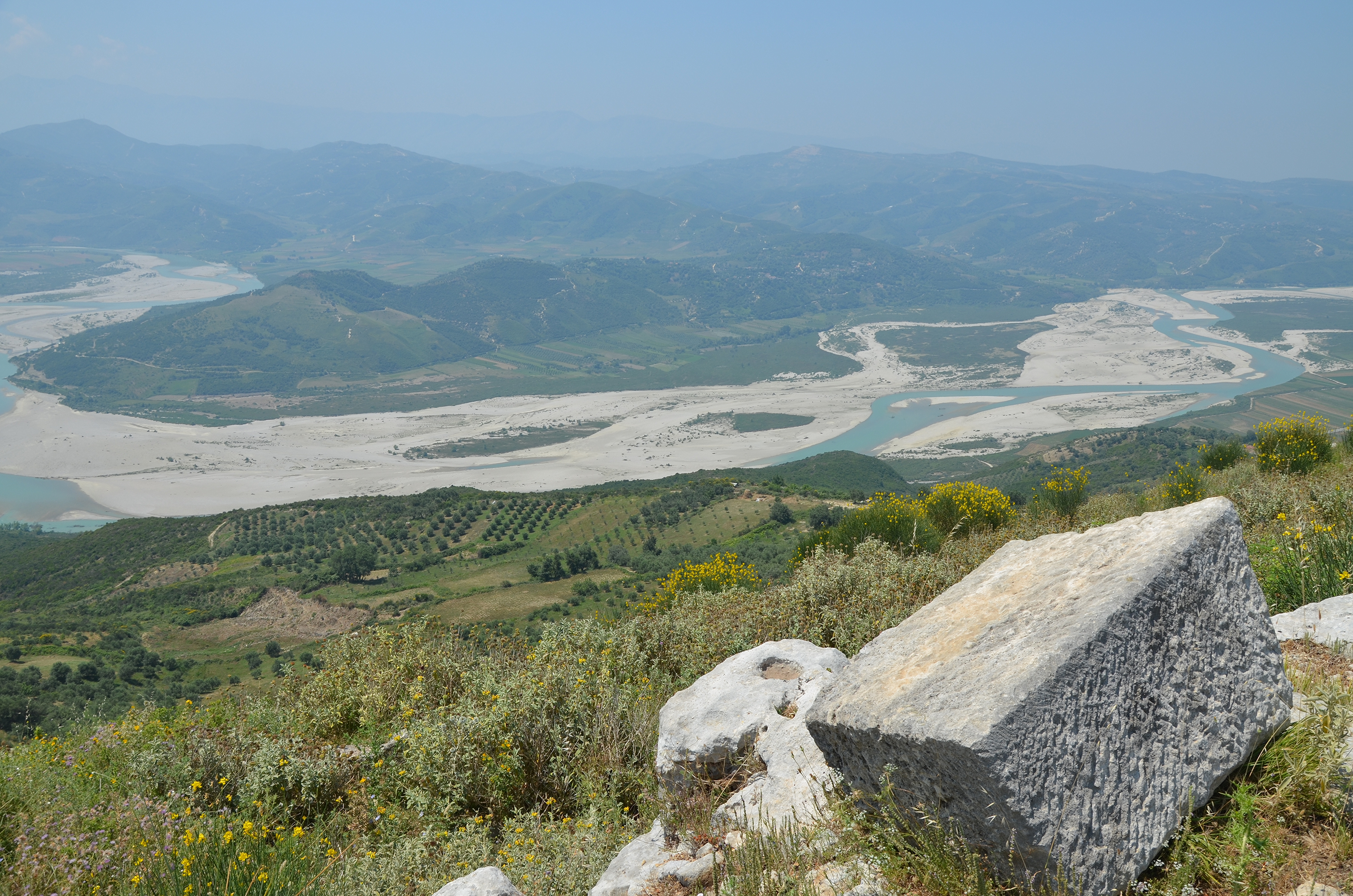
- Vjosa Valley

- Flag Emblem

- Map of Albania with Fier County highlighted
- Coordinates: 40°45′N 19°35′E
- Country: Albania
- Seat: Fier
- Subdivisions: 6 municipalities: Divjakë; Fier; Lushnjë; Mallakastër; Patos; Roskovec

Government
  - Council chairman: Evis Sema (PS)

Area
  - Total: 1,890 km^{2} (730 sq mi)
  - Rank: 8th

Population (2023)
  - Total: 240,377
  - Rank: 2nd
  - Density: 127/km^{2} (329/sq mi)
- Time zone: UTC+1 (CET)
  - Summer (DST): UTC+2 (CEST)
- HDI (2023): 0.804 very high · 10th
- NUTS Code: AL032
- Website: Official Website

Fier County (Albanian pronunciation: [fieɽ]; Albanian: Qarku Fier), officially the County of Fier (Albanian: Qarku i Fierit), is a county in the Southern Region of the Republic of Albania. It is the eighth largest by area and the third most populous of the twelve counties, with about 240,000 people within an area of 1,890 km^{2} (730 sq mi). The county borders on the Adriatic Sea to the west, the counties of Tirana to the north, Elbasan to the northeast, Berat to the east, Gjirokastër to the southeast and Vlorë to the south. It is divided into six municipalities, Fier, Divjakë, Lushnjë, Mallakastër, Patos and Roskovec, all of whom incorporate 42 administrative units.

== Geography ==
Until 2000, Fier County was subdivided into three districts: Fier, Lushnjë, and Mallakastër. Before 2015, it consisted of 42 municipalities.

== Economy ==
Fier County maintains a relatively strong economy within Albania with agriculture and heavy industry serving as a backbone of the area during the communist era. Wages in the county are above the Albanian average. More recently, a service-based economy has become more prominent locally as well as small-scale manufacturing by foreign companies.

Fier additionally has been the home of power-generation in Albania with the construction of the Fier Power Plant during the communist era. Although it was decommissioned in 2007, a joint Greek-Albanian venture was announced in 2023 to revitalize these thermal plants to diversify Albania’s electrical industry.

== Demographics ==
Historical population
Year	Pop.	±%
1950	129,785	—
1960	177,598	+36.8%
1969	242,394	+36.5%
1979	304,476	+25.6%
1989	379,342	+24.6%
2001	382,544	+0.8%
2011	310,331	−18.9%
2023	240,377	−22.5%

According to the last national census from 2023, Fier County had 240,377 inhabitants. Of the makeup, 96% identified as Albanians, 0.89% as Roma Gypsy or Balkan Egyptian, 0.20% of a South Slavic ethnicity (Serbs, Bosniaks, Macedonians, Bulgarians), 0.20% Aromanian, and 0.07% Greek.

=== Religion ===
Between the 2011 and 2023 censuses in Fier, the religious composition experienced several changes. The proportion of Sunni Muslims saw a decrease from 48.5% to 39.0%. In contrast, the presence of Bektashi Muslims significantly increased from 1.0% to 5.9%. The share of Catholic Christians decreased from 2.0% to 0.8%, while Orthodox Christians saw a slight increase from 13.8% to 16.0%. Evangelical Christians witnessed a growth from 0.1% to 0.4%.

Notably, there was a considerable expansion in the segment of the population identifying as believers without denomination, which more than doubled from 7.2% to 18.1%. The proportion of atheists also increased from 3.6% to 5.0%. Conversely, there was a marked decrease in the percentage of individuals who preferred not to answer, falling from 20.9% to 12.9%, and those whose religious affiliation was not stated or available also decreased from 2.9% to 1.9%.

Population of Fier according to religious group (2011–2023)
Religion group	Census 2011		Census 2023		Difference (2023−2011)	
Religion group	Number	Percentage	Number	Percentage	Number	Percentage
Sunni Muslim	150,559	48.5%	93,754	39.0%	-56,805	-9.5%
Bektashi Muslim	3,137	1.0%	14,130	5.9%	+10,993	+4.9%
Total Muslim	153,696	49.5%	107,884	44.9%	-45,812	-4.6%
Catholic Christian	6,149	2.0%	1,893	0.8%	-4,256	-1.2%
Orthodox Christian	42,695	13.8%	38,336	16.0%	-4,359	+2.2%
Evangelical	331	0.1%	886	0.4%	+555	+0.3%
Other Christian	174	0.1%	398	0.2%	+224	+0.1%
Total Christian*	49,349	15.9%	41,513	17.3%	-7,836	+1.4%
Atheists	11,190	3.6%	11,980	5.0%	+790	+1.4%
Believers without denomination	22,186	7.2%	43,452	18.1%	+21,266	+10.9%
Total Non-religious	33,376	10.8%	55,432	23.1%	+22,056	+12.3%
Prefer not to answer	64,960	20.9%	31,102	12.9%	-33,858	-8.0%
Not stated / Not available**	8,892	2.9%	4,446	1.9%	-4,446	-1.0%
TOTAL	310,331	100%	240,377	100%	-69,954	–

== See also ==
- Geography of Albania
- Politics of Albania
- Divisions of Albania
