= Zelevizhdë =

- Village
- Location within Albania
- Coordinates: 40°47′39″N 20°1′16″E
- Country: Albania
- County: Berat
- Municipality: Kuçovë
- Administrative unit: Lumas
- Time zone: UTC+1 (CET)
  - Summer (DST): UTC+2 (CEST)

Zelevizhdë is a village in the former municipality of Lumas in Berat County, Albania. At the 2015 local government reform, it became part of the municipality Kuçovë.
