= Bardhaj =

- Village
- Location within Albania
- Coordinates: 40°48′17″N 19°58′32″E
- Country: Albania
- County: Berat
- Municipality: Kuçovë
- Administrative unit: Lumas
- Time zone: UTC+1 (CET)
  - Summer (DST): UTC+2 (CEST)

Bardhaj is a village in the former municipality of Lumas in Berat County, Albania. At the 2015 local government reform it became part of the municipality Kuçovë.
