= Albpetrol =

- Type: Petroleum production marketing
- Founded: 1999
- Headquarters: Patos, Albania
- Key people: Florian Muçaj (Administrator)
- Website: www.albpetrol.al

Albpetrol is an Albanian upstream petroleum production and marketing company, which also monitors state petroleum agreements in Albania. Its stock is owned by the Albanian state. The company is headquartered in Patos and has a representative office in Tirana. The CEO of Albpetrol is Mr. Baftjar Zeqaj. Albpetrol is managing more than 1200 oil wells in the existing settlements of Patos, Ballsh, Karbunarë, Kuçovë, Gorisht-Kocul, Cakran-Mollaj and Amonicë.

Albpetrol the eleventh-largest company in Albania measured by 2016 revenues (and the third largest state owned company). Albpetrol profit for the fiscal year 2016 were US$13 million. The company is operating in 7 oilfields in Albania with a production of 110,000 tonnes of crude oil. During the last years Albpetrol has managed to have a sustainable position in the Albanian market.

== History ==
In 1918, Italian geologist Leo Madalena drilled the first Albanian oil well near Drashovica (Vlorë). The well reached a depth of 200 meters and, despite the small amount of oil produced, received positive results. The results attracted the attention of major oil companies, such as Anglo-Persian APOC Oil Company and American Standard Oil.

Since 1918, more than 5,650 oil and gas wells have been drilled in Albania. 500 natural gas wells have been drilled, with 255 producing natural gas, and five oil fields have 4,728 oil wells.

Albania currently has 12 known oil deposits and 5 natural gas deposits. Patos-Marinëz, an area of 44 thousand hectares, is the largest oil-bearing zone in continental Europe. It is estimated to contain 5.4 billion barrels of crude oil.

Albpetrol JSC operates according to the norms and rules of the market economy, with the object: Research and production of the hydrocarbons which included a full cycle of seismic works, geological, engineering, geophysics, research, extraction, processing and petroleum products marketing.

In 1974, Albpetrol achieved their maximum oil production, at 250,000 tons of oil/year (or 6,165 tons of oil/day equivalent to 38,408 barrels/day). Albpetrol's highest gas production was in 1982, at 940,000,000 Nm3 gas/year (or 2,575,342 Nm3 gas/day). In the 1970s and 80s, the oil industry was made of 34 enterprises who employed almost 25,000 employees, of which 2,800 where medium or senior specialists. In the latter part of 2013, several oil and gas fields were discovered and put in operation, including three oil and four natural gas fields in sandy layers and nine oil and one gas condensing oil field in limestone.

Before 1990, Albpetrol JSC was one of the largest subsidiaries of the Albanian State and one of the largest producers of revenue in the state budget. The transition from communism brought setbacks and reductions of society activity for Albpetrol. In the mid-1990s, a number of international oil companies came to Albania and took, by concession, the oil fields administered by Albpetrol. This changed the role of the company, which today not only produces oil, but serves as a regulatory entity and a controller of related hydrocarbon agreements between the Albanian state and foreign companies.

In January 1997, civil unrest in Albania resulted in the Patos headquarters building being set ablaze. As a result, Houston, Texas-based Fountain Oil, Inc. halted operations in the development of Gorischt-Kocul field until the safety of personnel and equipment could be guaranteed.

An attempt to privatize Albpetrol in 2012, by selling it to Vetro Energy for €850,000,000 failed in 2013 when Vetro's bid was invalidated for failure to produce the required 20% down payment, and talks with the second-place Win Business Petroleum Group of China were abandoned due to regulations regarding the bidding process.

In 2017, GBC Oil ceded control of two oil fields to Albpetrol as remuneration for failure to pay in excess of US$20,000,000.

== Geological reserves ==
The initial geological oil reserves, in total, according to the calculations made by the most qualified specialists until the years 1985 - 1990, are estimated 437,645,143 tons of oil, out of which 81,025,885 tons of oil reserves are considered extractable reserves. Until 01.01.2014 are produced a total of about 55,498,458,31 tons of oil, which means 68.49% of the extractable reserves or 12.68% of geological reserves. The geological reserves of gas, are estimated in a total of 18,163,700.000 Nm3 gas, and until 01.01.2013 is extracted a total of 12,503,725,787 Nm3. It remains to be extracted even 5,659,974,2013 Nm3 of gas. The value of extractable reserves of 81.025.885 tons of oil, in terms of a qualitative improvement of the technology of exploitation of wells and oilfields, particularly the last 20 years, is reassessed "a priori" and the highest is thought to be 50-60%, which means that the extractable reserves may be 110 to 120 million tons in total. A total of 277,615,000 Nm3 gas or 56.54% is extracted from the gas field. So from the extractable reserves of gas are still remaining in the layer about 90,635,000 Nm3 of gas.

The geological gas reserves estimated as safe are:
In the sandy deposits (extractable natural gas)	4,913,700,000 Nm3 of gas
In the sandstone and limestone deposits oil accompanying	13,250,000,000 Nm3
The total amount:	18,163,700,000 Nm3 of gas

In Albania are drilled a total of about 5 630 wells, of which 400 exploration wells, with a general length of over 7,000,000 linear meters, of which 2,118,516 ml for exploration wells and 4,881,484 ml for drilling-exploitation wells. The fields of oil and gas, are located in the districts of Sarande, Vlore, Mallakaster, Fier, Lushnja and Kuçove.

=== Summarized by type of rocks where the oil is found, the geological reserves estimated as safe are: === : In the sandy deposits / 338.696.109 tons; In the limestone deposits / 98.949.034 tons; Total amount: / 437.645.143 tons; Extractable reserves are about / 81.025.885tons
=== Until 01.01.2013 according to the type of rocks are extracted in total ===
Production of oil in the sandy deposits	27.389.865 tons
Production of oil in the limestone deposits	28.108.593 tons
Total amount:	55.498.458 tons
Remain to be extracted about	25.527.426 tons

== Gas Pipeline Network ==
The pipeline network is spread across the whole western part of Albania and ends at ORC in Ballsh. The physical map of the current distribution network is kept by Albpetrol, which is not obliged to display it publicly.

The local infrastructure of the gas network in Albania has a larger extent than the oil infrastructure. Gas fields are situated from Durrës, located in the center of Albania, up to Delvine, in the south of Albania, thus creating an opportunity for the consumers to be connected to the network. The limited infrastructure of the local gas in some countries is outside the operating condition and major rehabilitation works are needed. Parts of the network are not able to transport gas due to its corrosion and destruction. According to the forecasts, the existing gas pipeline network should be completely replaced.

== Society activities ==
The activity of Albpetrol JSC Society is:

1. Conduct of the Petroleum Operations in accordance with Law No. 7746, dated 28.08.1993 for the research, development, production, handling (treatment), transportation, storage and sale of the crude oil, gas and bituminous sands inside and outside of the Albanian Republic.
2. Conduct of any other commercial or services operation that serves Society activity. Society within the space provided by the legislation in force shall carry out any planner - preventive operation, commercial and financial, directly or indirectly associated with its object. This one includes also the opening of the activity and the establishment of other companies within and outside the country, as well as any other possible and lawful activity consistent with its interests.

The realization of the object of company activity shall be achieved through:

1. The Exploitation and development of the existing oil-bearing zones and gas-bearing of the country,
2. New research and development of the blocks in administration
3. Exploitation of bituminous sands.

Attributes of ex-APC (Albania Petroleum Corporation) in Tirana, dealing with the research-producing hydrocarbons passes Albpetrol JSC society, starting from 01/04/2003. The power supply of qualified customers. Electricity trading. Natural gas transportation.

Environmental permit for the activity with spotting in the environments in the oil fields in Kuçovë Patos-Marinez (Drize + Goran) Ballesh Hekal, Amonicë Gorisht areas, in gas fields in Divjak - Lushnje, Frakull-Fier, Povelç - Fier, Finiq Sarand area, transmission network of oil and gas products, bituminous sand field Kasnice-Fier, Kuçovë and Patos Mechanical Plants.

== See also ==
- Economy of Albania
