= Visoka =

Visoka may refer to:

- Visoka, Kardzhali Province, a village in southern Bulgaria
- Visoka (Arilje), a village in the municipality of Arilje, Serbia
- Visoka (Kuršumlija), a village in the municipality of Kuršumlija, Serbia
- Visoka oil field, an Albanian oil field
- Visoka, Split, an administrative division of Split, Croatia
- Visoka, Šibenik-Knin County, a village near Unešić, Croatia
- Visoka (mountain), a mountain in inland Dalmatia, Croatia near Sinj
- Visoka Mogila, a village in Boboshevo Municipality, Bulgaria

== See also ==
- Visoka polyana (disambiguation)
