= Patos, Albania =

Patos
- Municipality
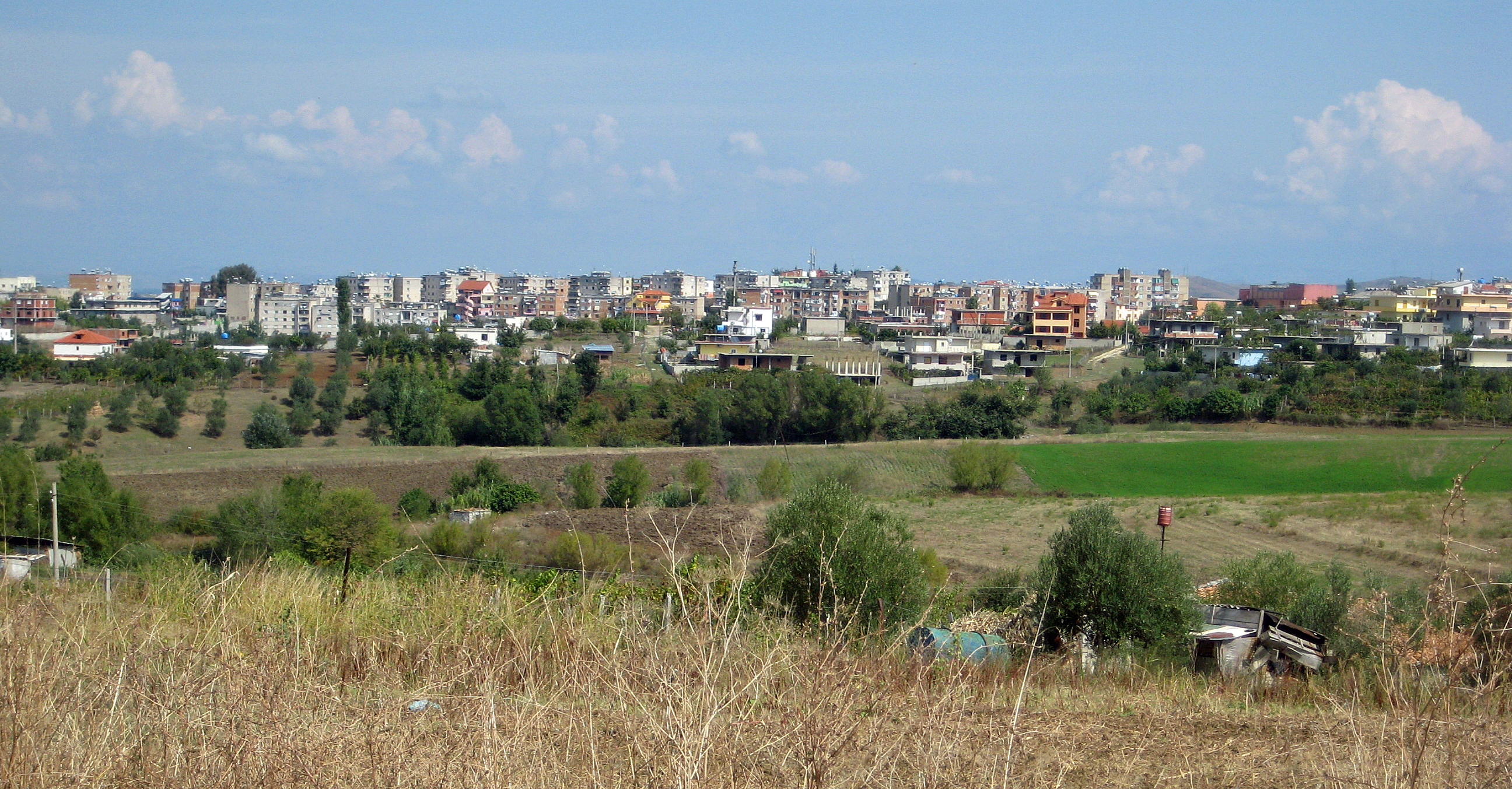
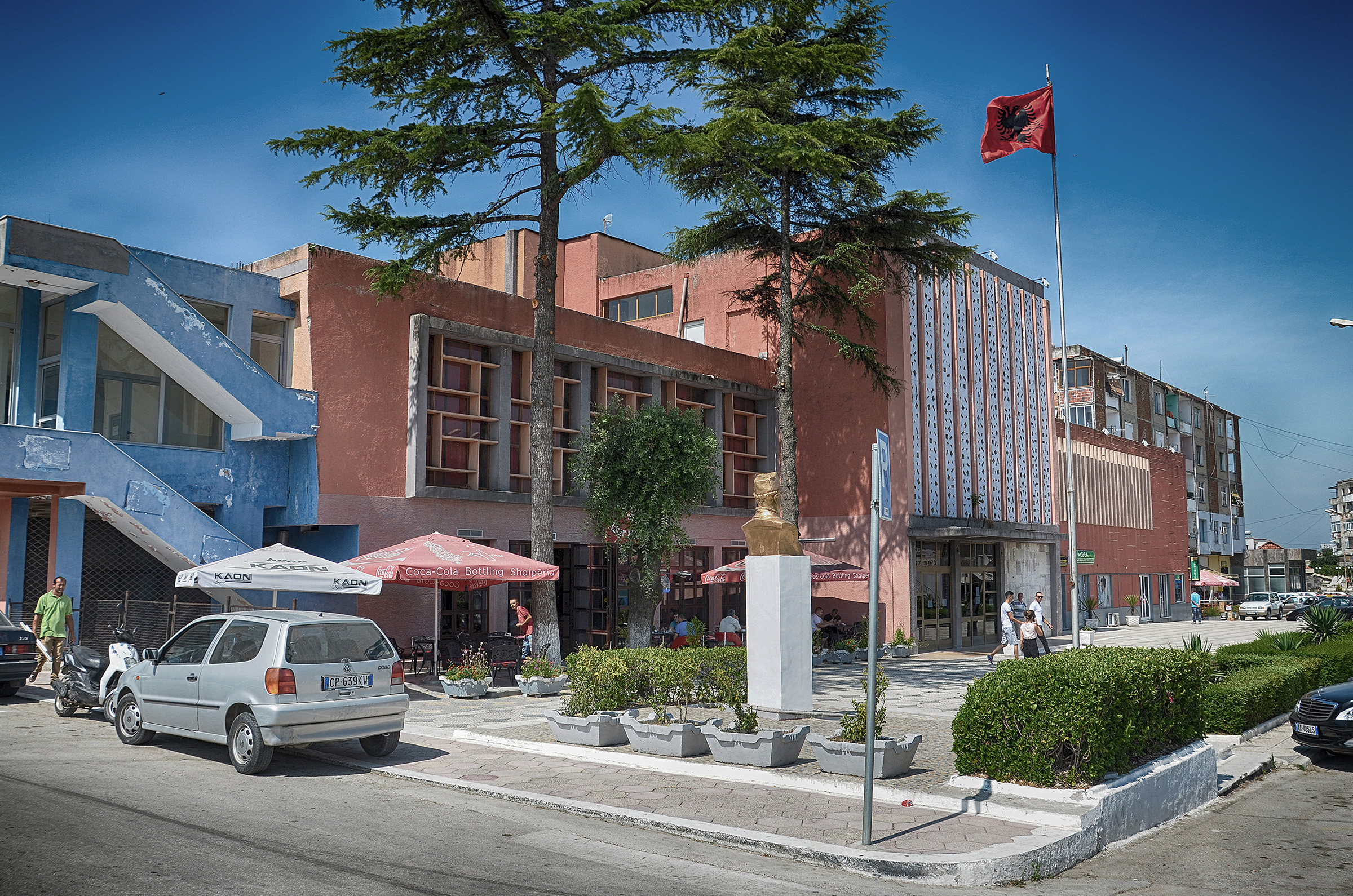
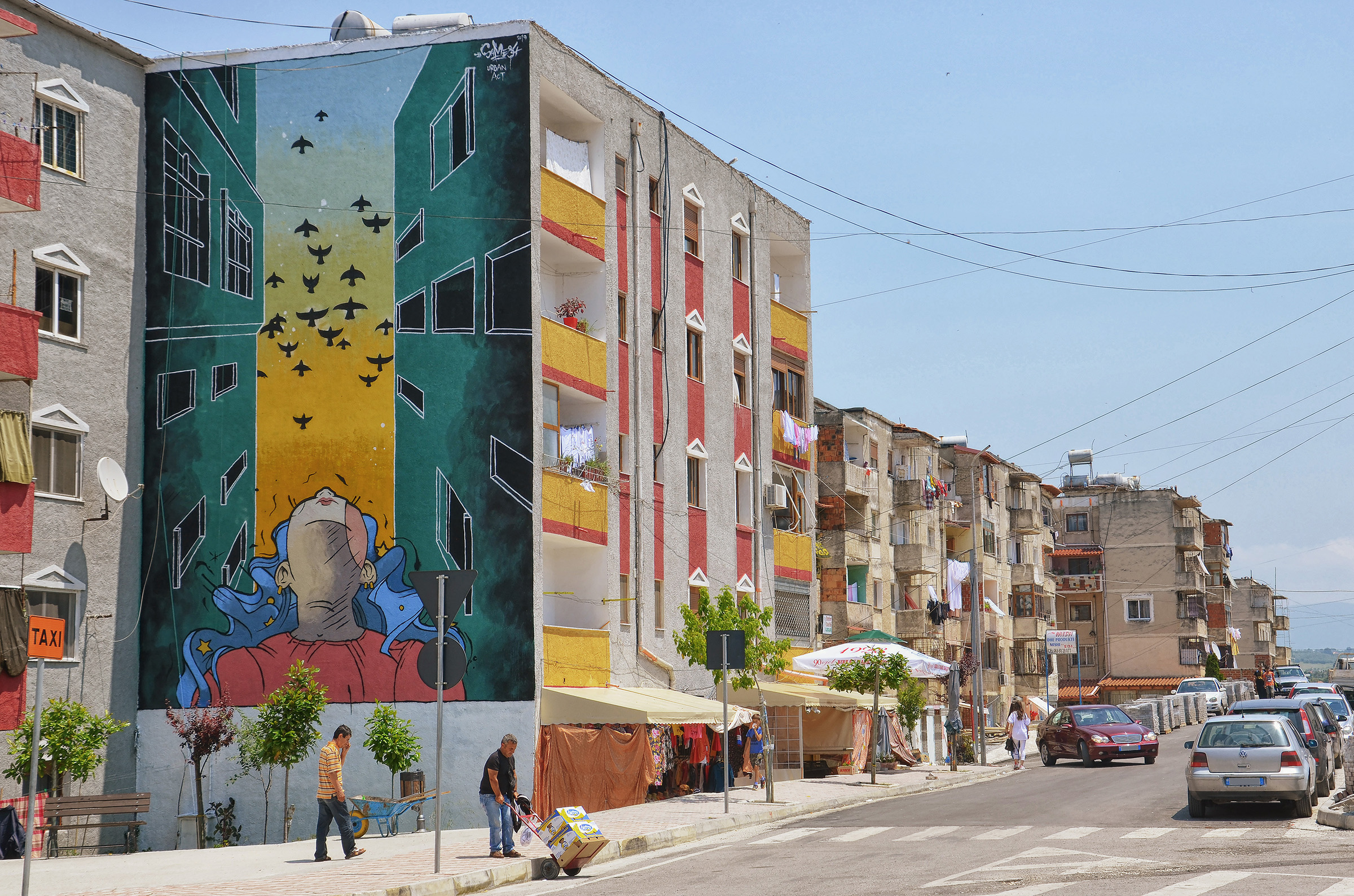
- From the top, Distant View of Patos, Cultural Centre and former Town Hall, Street scene in Patos

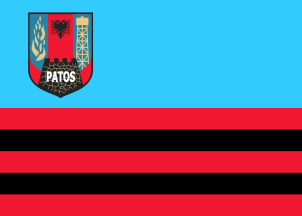
- Flag Emblem

- Location within Albania
- Coordinates: 40°41′N 19°37′E
- Country: Albania
- County: Fier

Government
  - Mayor: Fation Duro (PS)

Area
  - Municipality: 82.59 km^{2} (31.89 sq mi)
  - Administrative unit: 38.84 km^{2} (15.00 sq mi)

Population (2023)
  - Municipality: 18,227
  - Municipality density: 220.7/km^{2} (571.6/sq mi)
  - Administrative unit: 12,255
  - Administrative unit density: 315.5/km^{2} (817.2/sq mi)
- Time zone: UTC+1 (CET)
  - Summer (DST): UTC+2 (CEST)
- Postal Code: 9307
- Area Code: (0)381
- Website: bashkiapatos.gov.al

Patos (Albanian definite form: Patosi) is a town and a municipality in the County of Fier, Albania. The municipality was formed at the 2015 local government reform by the merger of the former municipalities Patos, Ruzhdie and Zharrëz, which became municipal units. The seat of the municipality is the town of Patos. The municipality's population is 18,227 as of the 2011 census, in a total area of 82.59 km^{2}. It is the center of the oil industry in Albania, and is 7 kilometers southeast of the city of Fier.

Historical population
Year	Pop.	±%
1989	23,605	—
2001	21,812	−7.6%
2011	15,397	−29.4%
2023	12,255	−20.4%

== History ==
Patos is a venerable city. It was a city for oil in the modern day and during the King of Albania era and the People's Socialist Republic of Albania era. The city was also for the workers to sleep in and investors. The city is one of the biggest offshore oil fields in the Balkans and Europe. The Patos-Marinza Oil Field was discovered in 1928. It produces about 11,854 barrels every day, more than other oil fields. It has a reserve of 2 billion barrels. This developed Patos into an oil hub for Europe and the world.

== Economy ==
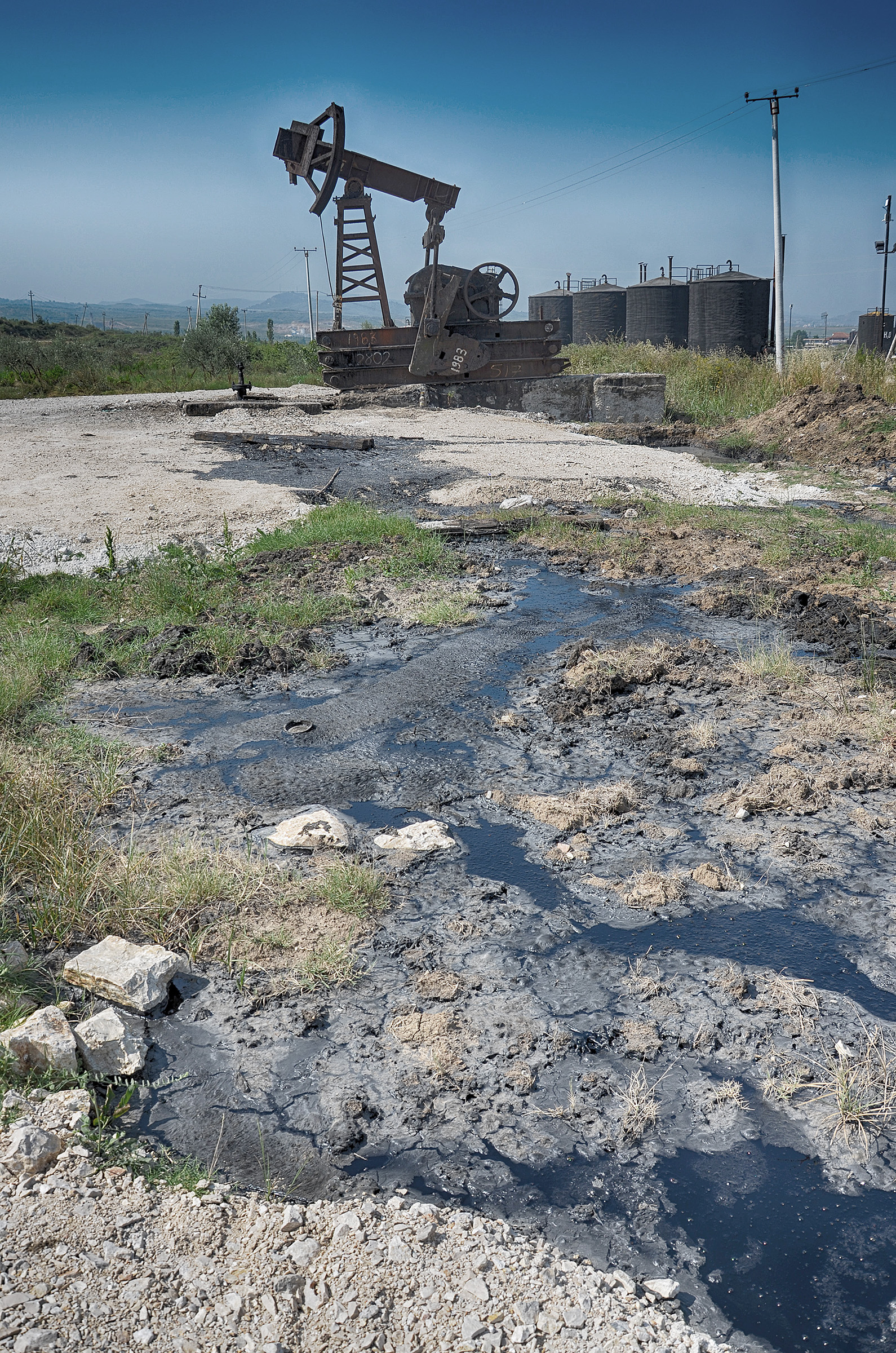
Patos-Marinza Oil Field

The economy of Patos is mainly based on oil companies such as Bankers Petroleum, and Albpetrol. Patos is on the Patos-Marinza Oil Field which one of the biggest offshore oil fields. There has been an estimate of 1.500 million barrels underground and there is a proven reserve of 2 billion barrels of oil. The Trans Adriatic Pipeline will cross Patos therefore there will be more business in the area and a higher economic impact. The economy is also heavily based on agriculture with a lot of arable land. The main crops are Olives in the hills and tomatoes, cucumbers, and more are produced in Patos. Patos lies in the region of Myzeqe. A region in which there is arable land for crops and this also lies on many other cities such as Lushnjë, Fier, Roskovec, and many other small villages are in this region. Patos is also home to the headquarters of Albpetrol.

=== Oil Producers in the Region ===
- Albpetrol
- Taçi Oil
- Bankers Petroleum
- Royal Dutch Shell
- Trans Adriatic Pipeline

== Geography ==
The landscape of Patos is half hills and mountains and plains. The plains are arable land for agriculture and oil fields. The plains are located north of Patos. The hills and mountain ranges have olive oil farms. The hills and mountains are located south of Patos.

=== Climate ===
The climate in Patos is scorching in the summer, with a hot Mediterranean climate and freezing winters.

=== Subdivisions ===
Patos, Ruzhdie, Zharrëz

== Transportation ==
=== Bus ===
There are buses in the city to take people places around Albania.

=== Train ===
There is no railway going through Patos, the nearest train stations are Fier and Ballsh.

=== Highways ===
The only major road that is near Patos is the SH73 on the outskirts of the city. The SH73 starts at Fier and ends in Poshnje.

== Sports ==
The main professional team representing the city is the football team Klubi Sportiv Albpetrol Patos. Its sponsor and owner is Albpetrol, and they play at the Alush Noga Stadium, which has a capacity of 4,000 spectators. The stadium was renovated in 2013 and 2016. They currently compete in the second tier and have one European appearance; against FC Balzers of Liechtenstein in the 1993–94 European Cup Winners' Cup, where they suffered a 3-1 away loss and a draw at home on the return leg.
