= BNK =

BNK may refer to:

- BNK Petroleum, a California-based oil company spun off in 2008 from Bankers Petroleum
- Bankers Petroleum (Toronto Stock Exchange symbol), a Canadian oil company
- Ballina Byron Gateway Airport (IATA code), a small regional airport in Ballina, New South Wales, Australia
- The Kurdish Digital Library, (French: La bibliothèque numérique kurde (BNK))
- BNK, a Russian aviation acronym for Byuro Novykh Konstruktsiy (Bureau of New Construction)
- BNK, (Russian: Военно-промышленная компания, romanized: Voyenno-promyshlennaya kompaniya) Military Industrial Company
- BNK, a computer file format
- "B.N.K.", a song by Eazy-E and Bone Thugs-n-Harmony from The Collection
- B-NK (Progenitor for B and NK), a term related to lymphopoiesis
- BNK, Busan Bank
- BNK48, an idol group based in Bangkok, Thailand

== See also ==
- BNK Financial Group, one of the three regional financial holding companies in South Korea
