= Petrit Malaj =

Albanian politician (born 1978)

Minister of Finance
- Incumbent
- Assumed office July 2024
- President: Bajram Begaj
- Prime Minister: Edi Rama
- Preceded by: Ervin Mete

Executive Director of the National Agency of Natural Resources
- In office 15 January 2024 – July 2024
- Preceded by: Adrian Bylyku
- Succeeded by: Erlind Sulo

Personal details
- Born: 13 October 1978 (age 47) Tirana, PSR Albania
- Education: University of Tirana; University of Wisconsin–La Crosse; Georgetown University
- Profession: Economist, financial consultant

Petrit Malaj (born 13 October 1978) is an Albanian economist and politician who has served as the Minister of Finance of Albania since July 2024.

== Early life and education ==
Malaj was born in Tirana in 1978. He graduated in 2001 with a degree in Finance and Banking from the Faculty of Economics at the University of Tirana. He later earned a master's degree in Business Administration from the University of Wisconsin–La Crosse in the United States. Additionally, he also completed professional training in banking and finance at Georgetown University.

== Career ==
From 2010 onward, he held a leadership position at BDO Albania, part of the global BDO network offering financial and consulting services. He has also worked in the Albanian banking sector, including at Raiffeisen Bank and the Italo-Albanian Bank, ( part of the Intesa Sanpaolo Banking Group).

In January 2024, he was appointed Executive Director of the National Agency of Natural Resources (AKBN). He assumed the role of Minister of Finance later that year, under the government of Edi Rama.
