= Qendër =

Qendër may refer to the following places in Albania:

- Qendër, Fier, an administrative unit in the Fier municipality
- Qendër, Malësi e Madhe, an administrative unit of the Malësi e Madhe municipality
- Qendër Bilisht, a village in the Devoll municipality
- Qendër Bulgarec, a village in the Korçë municipality
- Qendër Dukas, a village in the Mallakastër municipality
- Qendër Ersekë, a village in the Kolonjë municipality
- Qendër Leskovik, a village in the Kolonjë municipality
- Qendër Libohovë, a village in the Gjirokastër municipality
- Qendër Librazhd, a village in the Librazhd municipality
- Qendër Piskovë, a village in the Përmet municipality
- Qendër Skrapar, a village in the Skrapar municipality
- Qendër Tepelenë, a village in the Tepelenë municipality
- Qendër Tomin, a village in the Dibër municipality
- Qendër Vlorë, a village in the Vlorë municipality
