= Zharrëz oil field =

Oil field in Zharrëz, Albania

- Location within Albania
- Country: Albania
- Region: Fier County
- Location: Zharrëz
- Offshore/onshore: Onshore
- Coordinates: 40.703°N 19.645°E

Field history
- Discovery: 1977
- Start of production: 1978

Production
- Estimated oil in place: 21.3 million barrels (~2.91×10^{6} t)
- Estimated gas in place: 0.09×10^{9} m^{3} (3.2×10^{9} cu ft)

Zharrëz oil field is an Albanian oil field that was discovered in 1977. It is situated near the village of Zharrëz, east of Fier, the seventh largest city in Albania. It is one of the biggest on-shore oil fields of Albania. It began production in 1978 and produces oil. Its proven reserves are about 21.3 million barrels (3.39×10^{6} m^{3}).

== See also ==
- Oil fields of Albania
