= Durrës Block =

Oil field in Durrës, Albania

Durresi block
- Location within Albania
- Country: Albania
- Region: Durrës County
- Location: Durrës
- Offshore/onshore: Offshore
- Coordinates: 41°29′53″N 19°20′21″E
- Operator: Island Oil & Gas

Field history
- Discovery: 2003
- Start of production: 2005

Production
- Estimated oil in place: 1,958 million barrels (~2.671×10^{8} t)
- Estimated gas in place: 958×10^{9} cu ft (27.1×10^{9} m^{3})

Durresi block is a large off-shore Albanian oil and gas field. It was discovered in 2003 and production started in 2005. It is located 50 kilometres (31 mi) west of the city of Durrës in the west of central Albania. It is Albania's largest offshore oil and gas field.

== See also ==
- Patos Marinza
- Oil fields of Albania
