= Katundas =

- Village
- Location within Albania
- Coordinates: 40°51′N 20°1′E
- Country: Albania
- County: Berat
- Municipality: Kuçovë
- Administrative unit: Lumas
- Time zone: UTC+1 (CET)
  - Summer (DST): UTC+2 (CEST)

Katundas is a village in the former municipality of Lumas in Berat County, Albania. At the 2015 local government reform it became part of the municipality Kuçovë. The archaeological site of Katundas Cavern is located in the village.
