= BKX =

BKX may refer to:

- Ticker symbol for Bankers Petroleum Inc.
- IATA symbol for Brookings Regional Airport
- Beta Kappa Chi
