= Eni Vasili =

Albanian journalist (born 1976)

General Director of RTSH
- Incumbent
- Assumed office 25 April 2025
- Preceded by: Aurora Polo (acting)

Personal details
- Born: May 25, 1976 (age 50) Tirana, PSR Albania
- Education: IULM University of Milan
- Occupation: Journalist; writer; host; news reporter

Eni Vasili (born May 25, 1976) is an Albanian journalist, writer, former news reporter and the host of the TV talk show Open, which was initially broadcast on Top Channel and later moved to News 24. From April 2025 she served as the General Director of RTSH (Radio Televizioni Shqiptar), Albania's public broadcaster, becoming the first woman to hold the position.

== Career ==
Vasili graduated in communication at IULM University in Italy. She started her career in 1997 in the news department of RTSH. From 2005 to 2011 she hosted the political TV show Studio e Hapur on Albanian Screen where she also served as Director of news department. In 2013 she joined News 24 with Studio e Hapur. Vasili left Alsat in 2011 due to financial problems. In 2013, she joined News 24 television by hosting television's main political TV-show with the unchanged name, 'Studio e Hapur'. In September 2018, after weeks of negotiations during summer, Vasili moved to Top Channel, replacing Ylli Rakipi and his show 'Të paekspozuarit' who joined Top Channel after Sokol Balla left Top Channel in January 2018.

Vasili is author of two books, Unë kam vrarë ("I Have Killed") and Zëra nga errësira ("Sounds from the Darkness").
