= Albanian Screen =

Albanian television channel

- Type: Generalist channel
- Country: Albania
- Headquarters: Tirana, Albania

Programming
- Language: Albanian
- Picture format: 4:3

Ownership
- Owner: Rezart Taçi
- Parent: VeVe Group (2003–2010); Taçi Oil (2010–2015)
- Sister channels: Alsat (formerly)

History
- Founded: 1 January 2003
- Founder: Vebi Velija
- Former names: Alsat

Albanian Screen was an Albanian private television channel based in Tirana. Originally launched as Alsat in 2003 by businessman Vebi Velija, the station was among the earliest national private broadcasters established in Albania after the end of the communist regime. In 2011, the Albania-based affiliate was rebranded as Albanian Screen following its acquisition by oil entrepreneur Rezart Taçi.

The channel's sister station was Alsat-M (later rebranded to Alsat) in North Macedonia.

== History ==
Alsat operated as a general entertainment and news channel, broadcasting a mix of news programs, political talk shows, cultural content, documentaries, films and entertainment formats. The station was notable for becoming one of the first Albanian television channels to broadcast via satellite across Europe through the Eutelsat network, expanding its reach beyond Albania to the Albanian-speaking communities abroad.

During its early years, the channel aired programs such as Dita Fillon në Alsat, Studio e Hapur with Eni Vasili, Kontrast and Skaner Kampionat. In March 2006, the company expanded into North Macedonia with the launch of sister channel Alsat-M.

After the rebranding to Albanian Screen, its programming lineup included shows such as Prizëm, Bugajski Hour, Shine, Dritë Hije and Oda e Librit.

The channel maintained terrestrial coverage throughout Albania and was available through satellite transmission in Europe, North Africa and parts of Western Asia. It later used digital terrestrial broadcasting in Tirana and surrounding regions.

Despite being one of Albania’s largest commercial broadcasters by revenue, Albanian Screen experienced financial difficulties during the mid-2010s. The channel ceased operations on 5 June 2015 after entering bankruptcy proceedings. Following the closure, several former employees reportedly filed legal claims over unpaid social security contributions and salaries.
