= Vetro Energy =

Singaporean-American management company

- Company type: Private
- Industry: Oil and gas
- Products: Petroleum product
- Website: vetroenergy.com

Vetro Energy is a Singapore and Houston, Texas–based operating and management company with Rezart Taçi as its majority shareholder. Vetro Energy targets upstream oil & gas investments worldwide. In October 2012, Vetro Energy bid to privatize the Albania state-owned oil company Albpetrol.

== Albpetrol acquisition ==
On October 3, 2012, the Albania government announced, Vetro Energy won the bid for the privatization of Albpetrol, which would have given it the right to use the Albanian state-owned oil firm for the next 25 years. Vetro's bid of €850 million ($1.1 billion) for Albpetrol was rated 97.7 points by Albania's U.S. consultancy, Patton Boggs. Other bids included offers from China's Win Business Bright Oil, and Canada's Bankers Petroleum. After winning the bid to buy Albpetrol, Rezart Taçi announced on November 22, 2012, Vetro Energy had completed the financing of €850 million to finance the transaction.

The deal was subsequently cancelled by the Albanian government after Vetro Energy failed to pay the initial payment.
