= Shale gas in Romania =

Unconventional Shale gas in Romania has been prospected, licenses were given to several companies, but no exploitation has yet started. The current government led by Victor Ponta supports extraction of shale gas through fracking, but there have been protests against it. Romgaz discovered non-conventional gas resources (including shale gas) in 1994-1995 in Transylvania; however, they were only accidentally exploited.

== Government policy ==
When the Democratic-Liberal government began supporting shale gas extraction in 2012, the Social-Democratic Party voiced its opposition. In April 2012, a motion of no confidence written by the Social-Democrats led to the fall of the Ungureanu government. The motion of no confidence blamed the government for approving shale gas extraction without an appropriate legislative framework and without any geological studies.

When the Social-Democratic Party took power, its May 2012 party programme proposed the "immediate establishment of a moratorium on shale gas until the studies that are ongoing at European level on the environmental impacts of hydraulic fractionation process".

In June 2012, a proposal by several Vaslui County deputies to ban shale gas extraction through fracking was rejected by the Victor Ponta government, being also rejected by the Senate. Soon after, Ponta announced that the government would re-analyze its position on shale gas. In July 2012, PM Ponta announced that retired general Wesley Clark (who was working for shale gas company BNK Petroleum) would become an adviser of the Romanian government, fueling speculations of a change of policy regarding shale gas and fracking.

Following negotiations with petroleum corporation Chevron in December 2012, Ponta announced in January 2013 a reversal of the policies, saying that shale gas extraction "should be considered as something positive". The first permissions for the exploration of shale gas were given a few days later in January 2013.

== Companies involved ==
=== Chevron ===
American corporation Chevron has the rights to extract shale gas from a combined area of 870,000 hectares around Bârlad, as well as from several areas in Dobruja (Adamclisi, Vama Veche and Costinești), under 30-year contracts that can be extended for another 15 years.

The gas extraction rights for the Bârlad area were sold by Frank Timiș's Regal Petroleum to Chevron in 2010 for $25 million. Chevron was given in January 2013 the permission for exploration of shale gas in Bârlad and a few months later, in May 2013, it was also given permission for the exploration of the gas fields along the southern Romanian Black Sea coast. The royalties given to the Romanian state are between 3.5% and 13%, depending on the sizes of the deposits.

The exploratory drillings were supposed to start in October 2013 in Pungești, Vaslui County, however, following protests both in the village and in Bucharest, Chevron decided to suspend its activities. The Pungești local council announced the organization of a non-binding local referendum on the issue.

== Protests ==
Protests against shale gas were held in several major cities including Bucharest, Cluj-Napoca, Constanța, as well as in the areas where the exploitations will be done, including in the city of Vaslui and the village of Pungești. A small village in Vaslui County became a center of resistance against exploitation of shale gas.
