= Katundas Cavern =

Archaeological site

The Katundas Cavern, locally known as the Xherxhilla Cavern (Albanian: Shpella e Xherxhillës), is a cavern, in Katundas, Berat County, Albania, where archeological artifacts, dating from the Early Neolithic age, have been found. The site is part of the Cakran-Dunavec culture.

== History ==
The cavern is situated near Katundas, 20 km north of Berat, on one side of the canyon of the Sireci brook; on the opposite side of the canyon, is another fortified prehistoric settlement. The cavern is 60m long, and with an overall area of 450 msq. It has two entrances and a side window. The main entrance is 2.5m wide.

Judging from artifacts found (ceramics, as well as a stone knife, 7 cm long), it was continuously inhabited during all phases of the Neolithic period, starting from the Early Neolithic (6,000 BC), and continuing all the way to the Bronze Age. Some artifacts are similar to those found in Maliq, Tren, and Bënjë. During the 1986 diggings there were Early Neolithic findings of impressed ware in Adriatic type ceramics, as well as barbotine ceramics, and one vase with white decoration on a red background, which seems similar to ceramics produced in Podgorie and Vashtemi archaeological sites. Middle Neolithic artifacts were also found, represented by gray and black ceramic, also found in the Dunavec Cakran culture. The ornaments consist of triangles, filled with lines, which is typical for this type of Adriatic pottery.

Late Neolithic findings are represented by ceramics of clear background with paintings in brown color. The motifs painted consist of nets, or barbed wire patterns, which have also been seen in the sites of Maliq and Kamnik, whereas some patterns of painting, such as some zigzags, seem to be original to the Katundas culture.

The Copper Age pottery artifacts found are of good quality. Cups, pots, amphoras, and plates, pot covers, spoons, and other artifacts were found. Many of them have ornaments with incisions and paintings in gray color. The Copper Age pottery, present in the cavern, has certain qualities, found in other similar sites, such as the black shining wares, or plates with ornamented lines. The early bronze Age pottery is characterized by barbotine ceramics, which are ornamented with incised lines. A fraction of an ax has also been found, and can be dated to the Middle Bronze Age. The cavern seems to have been inhabited throughout the Iron Age. Artifacts of this era include imports from Corinth and Ionian islands. There are no indications that the cavern may have been inhabited after the 3rd century AD.
