= List of oil and gas fields in Albania =

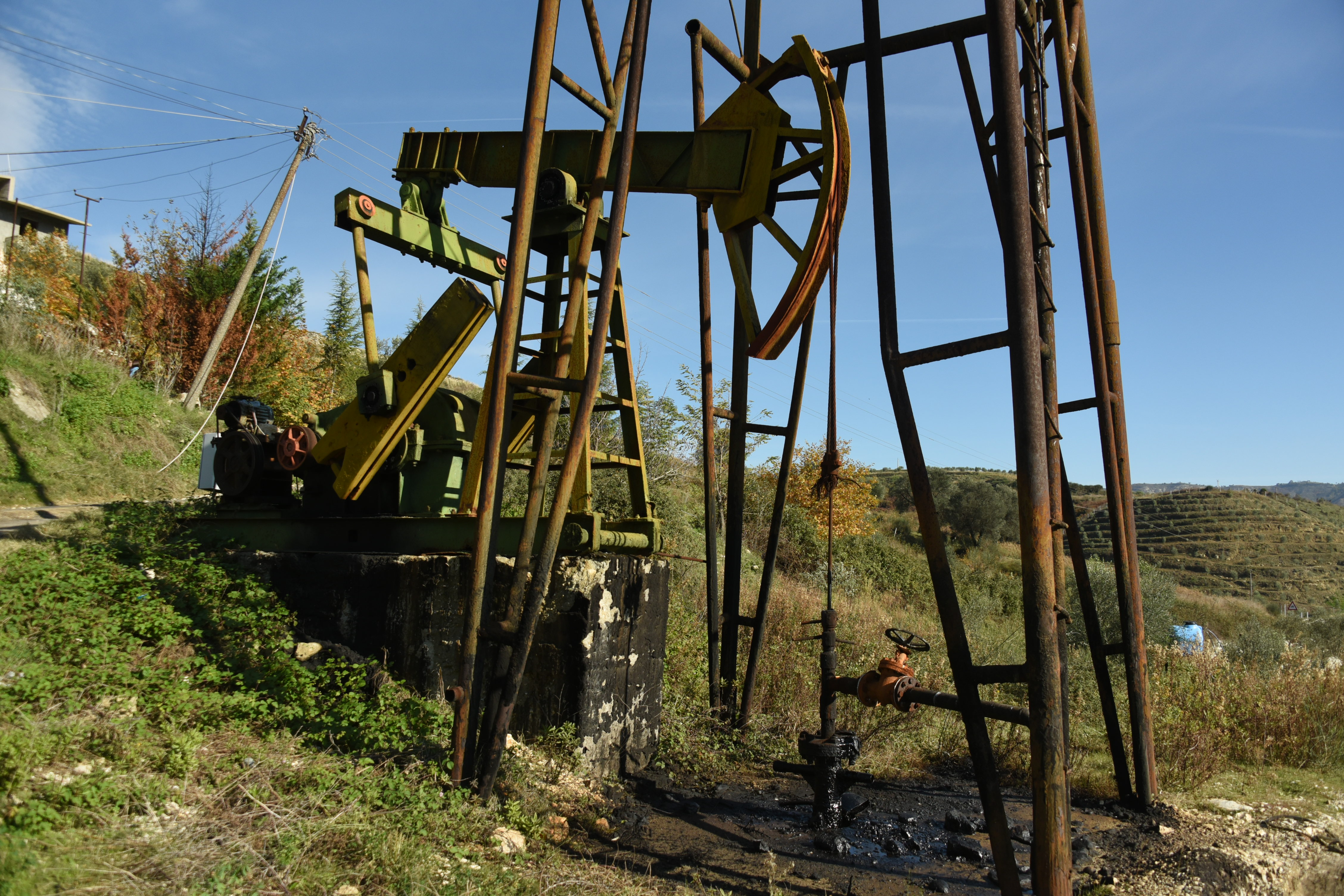
Oil well close to Berat, in Albania

Albania is a country rich in petroleum and gas resources both on and offshore. It is home to the largest onshore oil field in Continental Europe. The following is a list of oil and gas fields that are located in the country.

== Oil and Gas fields ==
Oil fields	Discovered	Operational	Superlative
Patos-Marinëz	1928	1930	Largest onshore oil field in Continental Europe
Kuçovë	1928	2004	Second largest oil field in Albania
Drizë	1939	1940	Its proven reserves are about 1,420 million barrels
Visokë	1963	1964	Its proven reserves are about 170 million barrels
Gorisht-Kocul	1966	1966	Its proven reserves are about 256 million barrels
Ballsh-Hekal	1967	1967	Its proven reserves are about 135 million barrels
Finiq-Kranë	1974	-	-
Kallem-Verri	1975	1976	Its proven reserves are about 14.2 million barrels
Arrëz	1975	1976	Its proven reserves are about 32.66 million barrels
Goran	1975	1976	Its proven reserves are about 142 million barrels
Zharrëz	1977	1978	Its proven reserves are about 21.3 million barrels
Çakran-Mollaj	1978	1978	Its proven reserves are about 192 million barrels
Amonicë	1980	1981	Its proven reserves are about 20 million barrels
Karbunarë	-	-	-
Drashovicë	-	-	-
Pekisht-Murriz	-	-	-
Oil & Gas fields	Discovered	Operational	Superlative
Kallm	1963	-	-
Panajë	-	-	-
Frakull	1972	-	-
Ballaj-Kryevidh	1983	-	-
Divjakë	-	-	-
Povelcë	1987	-	-
Delvinë	1989	-	-
Durrës Block	2003	2005	Largest offshore oil and gas field in Albania
Molisht-Shpirag	2003	2005	-
Pipelines	Founded	Operational	Superlative
Trans Adriatic Pipeline	2003	2022	Longest pipeline in Albania 211 km (131 mi)

== See also ==
- List of oil and gas fields of the North Sea
