= Ruzhdie =

- Administrative unit
- Location within Albania
- Coordinates: 40°40′N 19°42′E
- Country: Albania
- County: Fier
- Municipality: Patos

Population (2011)
  - Administrative unit: 2,326
- Time zone: UTC+1 (CET)
  - Summer (DST): UTC+2 (CEST)

Ruzhdie is a village and a former municipality in the Fier County, southwestern Albania. After the 2015 local government reform, it became a subdivision of the municipality Patos. The population at the 2011 census was 2,326. In May 2010, it came to prominence in Albania as the hottest spot in a vote recount of the elections.
