= Kuçova oil field =

Albanian Oil Field

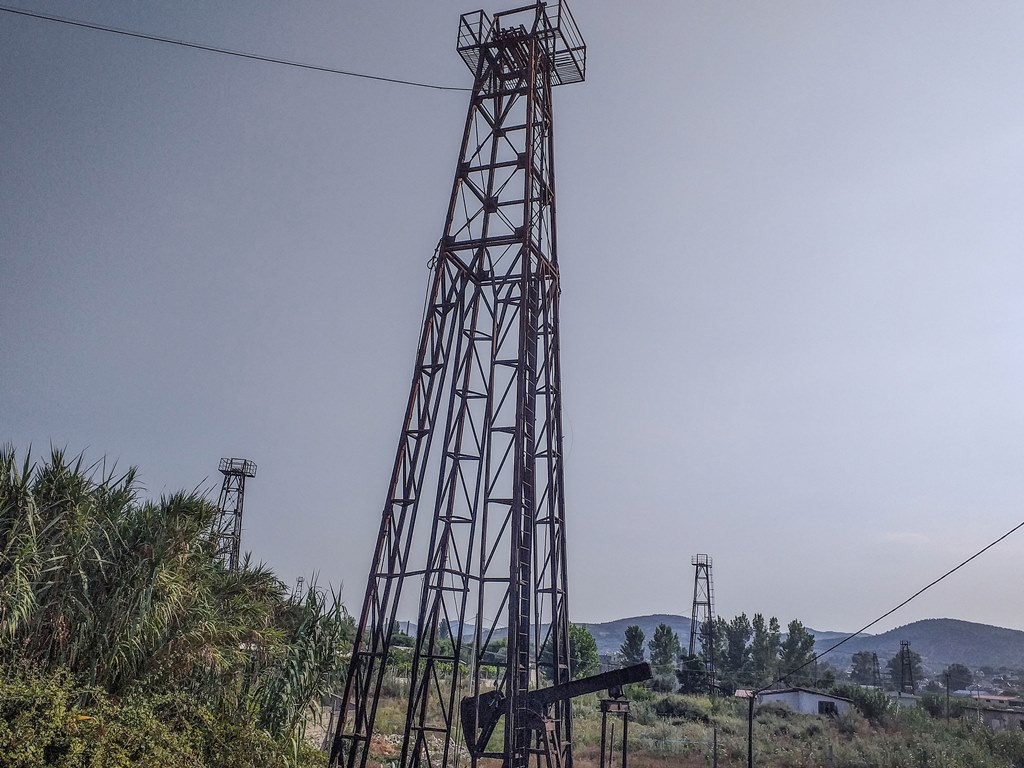

- Location within Albania
- Country: Albania
- Region: Berat County
- Location: Kuçovë
- Offshore/onshore: Onshore
- Coordinates: 40.82°N 19.92°E
- Operators: Albpetrol
- Partners: Sherwood

Field history
- Discovery: 1928
- Start of production: 2004

Production
- Current production of oil: 1,000 barrels per day (~50,000 t/a)
- Estimated oil in place: 1,000 million barrels (~1.4×10^{8} t)

Kuçova oil field is an Albanian oil field that was discovered in 1928. It is the second biggest on-shore oil field of Albania, after the Patos-Marinza Oil Field. The Kuçova oil field is located near the town of Kuçovë, 30 kilometres (19 mi) east of the city of Fier in south central Albania. Its proven reserves are about 490 million barrels (78×10^{6} m^{3}).

The field is operated by Albpetrol and Sherwood International Petroleum.

== See also ==
- Oil fields of Albania
