= Goran oil field =

Albanian oil field discovered in 1975

- Country: Albania
- Region: Fier County
- Location: Fier
- Offshore/onshore: Onshore

Field history
- Discovery: 1975
- Start of production: 1976

Production
- Estimated oil in place: 142 million barrels (~1.94×10^{7} t)
- Estimated gas in place: 0.4×10^{9} m^{3} (14×10^{9} cu ft)

Goran oil field is an Albanian oil field that was discovered in 1975. It is one of the biggest on-shore oil fields of Albania. It began production in 1976 and produces oil. Its proven reserves are about 142 million barrels (22.6×10^{6} m^{3}).

== See also ==
- Oil fields of Albania
