= Rezart Taçi =

Albanian businessman

- Born: 1971 (age 54–55); Ersekë, PR Albania
- Occupations: Oil worker; entrepreneur; sports manager
- Years active: 1998–present
- Known for: Taçi Oil; ARMO oil refiner Albanian Screen; Vetro Energy

Rezart Taçi is an Albanian businessman who is best known for being the founder and CEO of Taçi Oil.

== Career ==
Taçi was born and raised in Ersekë, Albania. In 1998, he began his career in the trading industry of finished oil products, where he established his reputation. He has built a portfolio of companies in the energy and media sectors. In 2003, Taçi established Taçi Oil International Trading and Supply Company Sh.A (Taçi Oil). At its inception, the company employed six people and leased storage facilities in Shëngjin, Lezhë, a port on the northern coast of Albania. Later, Taçi Oil acquired the facility and expanded operations with additional tankers and facilities at the Port of Durrës. The combined storage capacity of the two facilities exceeds 80,000 cubic meters and continues to expand. In 2004, Taçi established Anika Enterprises S.A. (ANIKA), a company based in Switzerland that acts as the trading arm of Taçi Oil to support operations and expand international partnerships. In 2006, Taçi established KUID Sh.p.k (KUID) to expand into the retail sector of refined products. The company began operating 29 petrol stations, expanding to 84 stations by 2009. As of 2012, there were over 300 Taçi Oil petrol stations and 1,400 employees. In 2008, Taçi participated in the international tender for the privatization of Albanian Refining and Marketing of Oil Sh.A (ARMO). He was awarded the tender and acquired 85% of the shares of ARMO. In 2013, Taçi Oil sold 80% of the assets of ARMO, the oil refining business, to Heaney Assets Corporation, a company based in Azerbaijan.

=== Legal issues and investigations ===
Taçi has been the subject of multiple criminal investigations and legal actions by Albanian authorities. In 2013, the Directorate for Economic and Financial Crime at the General State Police filed a criminal report against him for alleged tax evasion, claiming that he and several associates failed to declare significant oil sales and avoided tax obligations, with alleged damages amounting to millions of U.S. dollars; his associates were also investigated for tax evasion, financial fraud, and forgery.

Subsequently, the Prosecution Office of Tirana formally accused Taçi of “non-payment of taxes” totaling approximately 1 billion Albanian lek for the period 2009–2013 while he was administrator and shareholder of ARMO, alleging that he intentionally avoided tax payments while transferring funds between affiliated companies or withdrawing cash for personal use.

In July 2024, the Prosecutor's Office at the Court of First Instance of Tirana concluded investigations in a case dating back to 2018 and referred Taçi to trial for alleged fraudulent value-added tax (VAT) schemes. Prosecutors claimed that one of his companies issued inflated service invoices and improperly credited VAT through fictitious transactions, resulting in unjustified VAT credits and discrepancies in reported fuel sales.

In addition, the Special Prosecutor's Office against Corruption and Organized Crime (SPAK) investigated allegations of money laundering and participation in a structured criminal group related to international financial transactions. In early 2024, SPAK closed its preliminary investigation and forwarded the case to the Special Court against Corruption and Organized Crime, alleging involvement in coordinated financial schemes and concealment of proceeds derived from criminal activity.
