= Kallem-Verri oil field =

Oil field in Fier County, Albania

Coordinates: 40.76°N 19.64°E

- Location within Albania
- Country: Albania
- Region: Fier County
- Location: Verri
- Offshore/onshore: Onshore

Field history
- Discovery: 1975
- Start of production: 1976

Production
- Estimated oil in place: 14.2 million barrels (~1.94×10^{6} t)
- Estimated gas in place: 0.75×10^{9} m^{3} (26×10^{9} cu ft)

Kallem-Verri oil field is an Albanian oil field that was discovered in 1975. It is one of the biggest on-shore oil field of Albania. It is situated near the villages Kallmi and Verri, both in the Mbrostar municipal unit. It began production in 1976 and produces oil. Its proven reserves are about 14.2 million barrels (2.26×10^{6} m^{3}).

== See also ==
- Oil fields of Albania
