= Driza oil field =

Albanian oil field

- Location within Albania
- Country: Albania
- Region: Fier County
- Location: Drizë
- Offshore/onshore: Onshore
- Coordinates: 40.704°N 19.550°E

Field history
- Discovery: 1939
- Start of production: 1940

Production
- Estimated oil in place: 1,420 million barrels (~1.94×10^{8} t)
- Estimated gas in place: 6×10^{9} m^{3} (210×10^{9} cu ft)

Driza oil field is an Albanian oil field that was discovered in 1939. It is one of the biggest on-shore oil field of Albania. It is situated near the village Drizë, on the southern edge of the city of Fier (a major city). It began production in 1940 and produces oil. Its proven reserves are about 1,420 million barrels (226×10^{6} m^{3}).

== See also ==
- Oil fields of Albania
