= Cakran-Mollaj oil field =

Albanian oil field

- Location within Albania
- Country: Albania
- Region: Fier County
- Location: Cakran; Mollaj
- Offshore/onshore: Onshore
- Coordinates: 40.6°N 19.62°E
- Operator: Stream Oil & Gas

Field history
- Discovery: 1978
- Start of production: 1978

Production
- Current production of oil: 650 barrels per day (~32,000 t/a)
- Estimated oil in place: 192 million barrels (~2.62×10^{7} t)
- Estimated gas in place: 15×10^{9} m^{3} (530×10^{9} cu ft)

Cakran-Mollaj oil field is a large on-shore Albanian oil field that was discovered in 1978. It is located 50 kilometres (31 mi) southeast of the city of Fier in south central Albania. Its proven reserves are about 192 million barrels (30.5×10^{6} m^{3}). It produces approximately 650 barrels per day (103 m^{3}/d).

== See also ==
- Patos Marinza
- Oil fields of Albania
