= Eltjon Valle =

Albanian painter

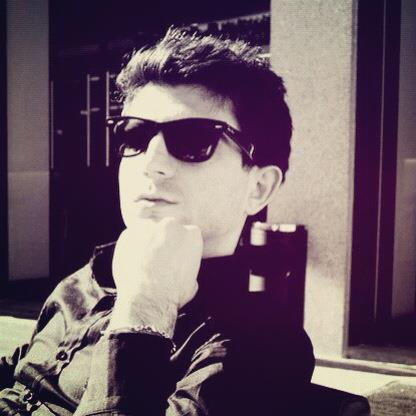
- Born: 1984 (age 41–42); Kuçovë, Albania
- Occupation: Artist

Eltjon Valle (born 1984 in Kuçovë, Albania), is an artist. He lives and works in Milan, Italy.

== Life and career ==
In the early 2000s he studied fine arts at the Accademia di Belle Arti di Brera. He finished his bachelor's degree in 2007, and his master's degree in fine arts in 2009. His medium was oil, and he's been using it in naturalistic representation. Thanks to his architectural landscapes, his portraits and his site specific interventions, he is one of the actually active artists living in this city.

== The early times ==
The beginnings of Valle as a painter, belong to his hometown, which under the communism was an industrial basement of petrol. This element, oil, is the first one that Valle started painting with, during his early childhood. Valle has kept it on by then, as a common denominator to some of his most important series of paintings. Such as the series of the cursed writers of the 20th century (started in 2006).

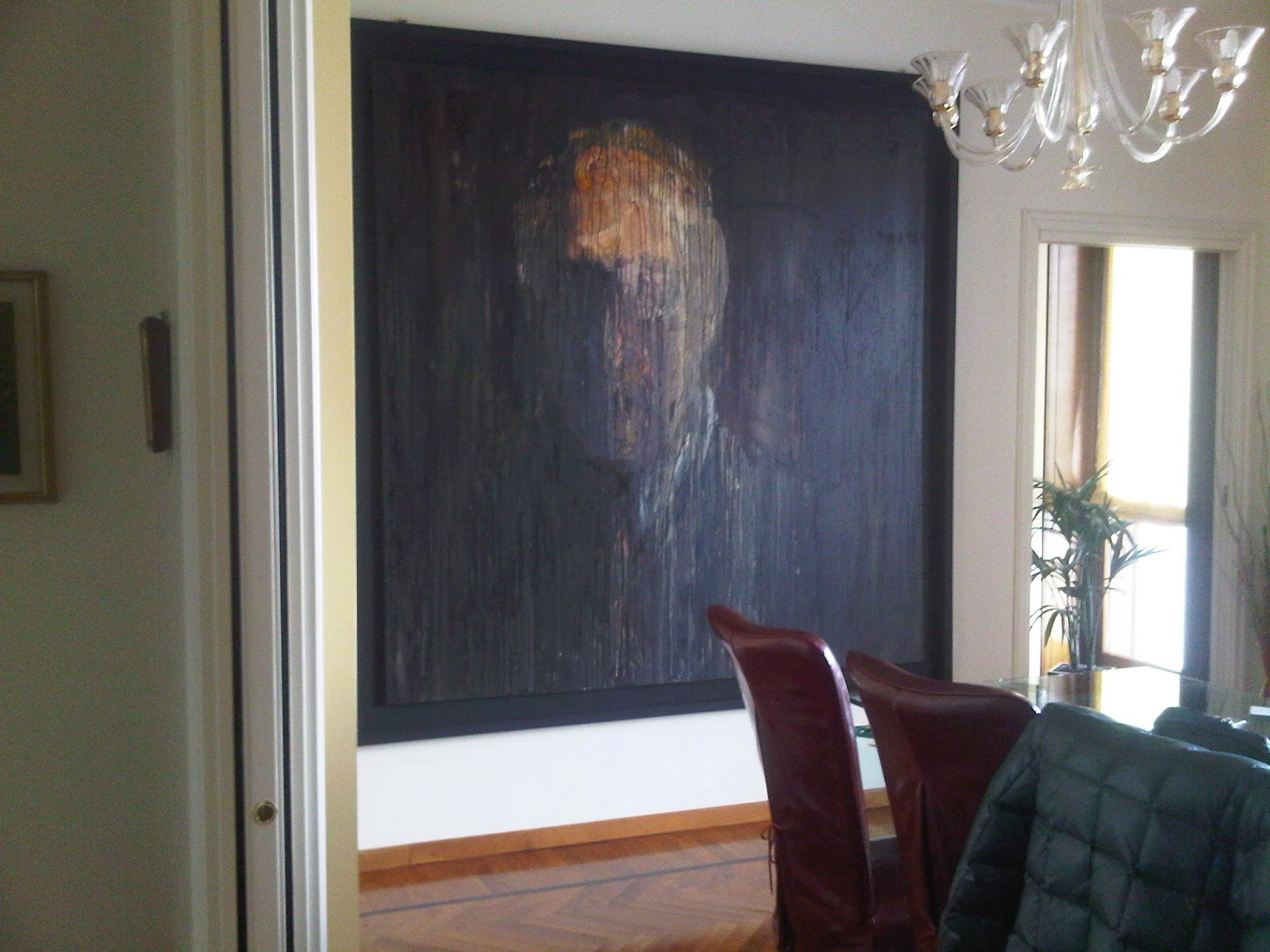
Eltjon Valle, Portrait of William Burroughs

Or the series of flowers (2012). Or the series of the homages he pays to fashion.

One of his most representative series of works are the "land pieces", actually pieces of polluted land he collects in the country of Marinz (Al), and engraces with butterflies.

Petrol is one of the main factors of global changes that regard development and pollution, and Valle through his paintings and other types of work, keeps investigating the negative and 'positive' effect of this exploitation on the everyday life, and its consequences on the living and perception of modern landscape. He has participated to some collectives and also to some personal exhibitions.

== The researches ==
The main project of Valle in this context is the Marinz Project. This is a site specific based one. Marinz is a small country close to that industrial city where Valle grew. In the uncontaminated communist Albania, it was the polluted exclusion. Since the year 2012 the artist has been painting polluted flowers of Marinz, while taking its land pieces to transform them into art works, by drying and adorning them, acclimating and taming them, making them so to say, domestic. Valle seems to sustain that everything is nature, even pollution. That's why, he tries to witness that a new beauty appeared in our time, the polluted one.

== Exhibitions and participation ==
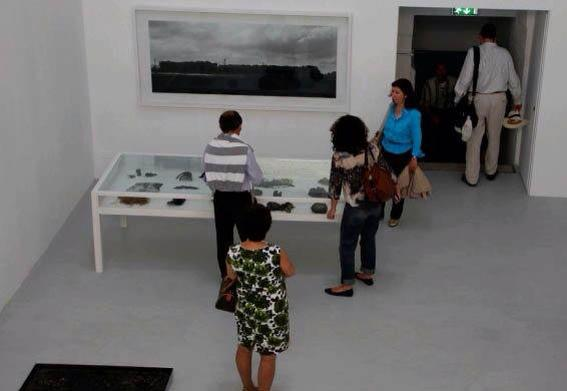
Eltjon Valle, Island 2011 Mixed media 100 x 210 x 100 x 100 x 210 cm Albanian Pavilion La 54ma Biennale di Venezia Courtesy of the artist

Some of his main exhibitions have been:

- 2014: "All About These... Ladies and Gentlemen", curated by Fani Zguro, Gallery on The Move in collaboration with Co-Pilot, Istanbul (Turkey), "New Contemporaries", Gallery On The Move, Art Cologne (Germany)
- 2013: "Bridge Country", Gallery On The Move, ViennaFair (Austria), "Established", Gallery On The Move, MiArt, Fiera di Milano (Italy), "New Entries", Gallery On The Move, Artissima, Turin (Italy), "Make It Easy Make It Porn", curated by Fani Zguro, Gallery On The Move in collaboration with Casa Tres Patios, Medellin (Colombia), "The Ice Palace", Nuova Galleria Morone, Pulse, Miami (USA), "WonderfulW", Galleria Maurizio Caldirola, Monza (Italy)
- 2013: "Galleria Morone", Pulse, Miami (USA), "Gallery On The Move", MiArt, Milan (Italy), "Make It Easy Make It Porn", Casa Tres Patios, Medellin (Colombia), "Gallery On The Move", Vienna Art Fair, Vienna (Austria)
- 2011: "Geopathies", Commissioner Parid Teferici, Curator Riccardo Caldura, Albanian Pavilion, The 54th International Art Exhibition La Biennale di Venezia (Italy), "Talk", Fondazione Bevilaqua di Massa, Venezia (Italy)
- 2009: “Così vicina. Così lontana. Arte in Albania Prima e Dopo il 1990”, curators Matteo Fochessati, Rubens Shima, Sandra Solimano, Museo D’Arte Contemporanea Villa Croce, Genoa (Italy), “Video Art-It's Liquid”, NCCA, Moscow (Russia)
- 2008: “Do you know where the paradoxes blossom”, curator Riccardo Caldura, The 15th International Onufri Prize, “Video Art & Architecture”, Micro Museum, New York (USA), “Marinz”, curator Francesco Poli, Rubens Shima, The National Gallery of Arts Tirana (Albania)
- 2007: “Betrayal in Art”, curator Ervin Hatibi, Rubens Shima, The 14th International Onufri Prize, The National Gallery of Arts Tirana (Albania), “Petrol Pax”, curator Rubens Shima, Albanian Pavilion/OFF, La 52 Edizione della Biennale di Venezia (Italy)
- 2006 “People & Places”, Leonardo Milan Gallery (Italy)
