= Bankers Petroleum Albania =

Oil company

Bankers Petroleum Albania Ltd.
- Type: Subsidiary
- Industry: Oil and gas industry
- Founded: 15 April 2004
- Headquarters: Fier, Albania
- Area served: Worldwide
- Key people: Hongping Xiao Chief Executive Officer (CEO) Lianyi Wang Finance and Chief Financial Officer (CFO) Zhang Fuguo deputy General Director, HR & Administration Manager
- Products: Oil (fuels, lubricants); Natural gas (LNG); Petrochemicals
- Services: Oil and gas extraction, petroleum and Petroleum products merchant wholesalers, Mining, Quarrying
- Revenue: $583 million (2014) $287 million (2015)
- Number of employees: 541 (2019)
- Parent: Geo -Jade Petroleum Corporation
- Website: www.bankerspetroleum.com

Bankers Petroleum Albania Ltd. is a subsidiary of China's Geo-Jade Petroleum, and the dominant oil operator in Albania. The company operates, among others, the Patos-Marinza oil field, the largest oil field in the country and one of the largest onshore fields in Europe, producing 95% of crude oil in Albania. Since the beginning of its presence in Albania, Bankers has allegedly made profits of €4 billion and paid around $900 million in royalties and duties.

== History ==
Bankers Petroleum Albania, (formerly Saxon International Energy Ltd. ) - originally owned by the Canadian oil and gas exploration and production company "Bankers Petroleum Ltd", - in 2004 signed a 25-year agreement with the Albanian state, through the Albanian National Agency of Natural Resources and the state oil and gas company Albpetrol, for the management and exploitation of the Patos-Marinza heavy oil field, located in the south-central region of Albania - the largest onshore oil field in continental Europe. It also acquires the Kuçova light oil field, 30 kilometres east of Patos-Marinza, as well as an exploration licence in "Block F", an area of 185,000 hectares adjacent to the Patos-Marinza field with potential for natural gas. By 2006, Bankers Petroleum had received a $20 million (€15.6 million) loan from "Raiffeisen Bank" to develop the oil field - the largest loan ever made by a local bank in Albania. In 2008, Bankers Petroleum spun off its North American assets as BNK Petroleum, named "Bankers Petroleum Albania Ltd", and commenced vertical and horizontal infill drilling, and waterflood development to significantly increase oil production and reserves. Seeking international financing for the development of its operations, in 2009 receives funding from the International Finance Corporation (IFC) and the European Bank for Reconstruction and Development (EBRD) up to USD 230.8 million.

In January 2016, the Energy Ministry announced Albania's intention to renegotiate its contracts with all oil companies with a view to reducing the margin of tax-free spending. In the context of this decision, Banker's Petroleum opted to sell its shares to the Chinese oil and gas company Geo-Jade Petroleum in March 2016. Upon receiving approval from the State Administration of Foreign Exchange (SAFE) in October 2016, the Chinese company proceeded to acquire all of Bankers' issued and outstanding common shares through its subsidiaries for approximately $575 million.

== Significant events ==
=== Τax dispute ===
In accordance with the terms of the contract signed with the Albanian state, the company has been granted the right to refrain from paying income tax until such time as its profits have amortized its investments. In 2015, the Albanian tax authorities alleged that the company had incurred inflated and inadequately justified expenses with the intention of maintaining and perpetuating its tax exemption. In particular, the National Agency of Natural Resources (AKBN) determined that the company's expenses had already been covered in 2011 and therefore owed the specified tax (50% of profits). Instead, the company was found to have racked up $247 million in irregular expenses to avoid paying $60 million in taxes. Bankers Petroleum contested the calculations, asserting that had documented all its costs. To resolve the dispute, the two parties engaged the services of an independent auditing firm, which validated the company's position. The Albanian government didn’t accept it and continued the battle in the International Court of Arbitration which in its final award on 18 June 2024, ruled in favor of the Albanian state.

=== Tax Evasion ===
In 2014, the Albanian government introduced excise duty on semi-processed solar fuel produced at the A.R.M.O. refinery in Ballsh. This was due to concerns that the product, which had been declared as raw material, was being sold on the market, resulting in a significant tax evasion scheme. In September 2017, the General Directorate of Customs initiated an inspection of the company's premises in Patos Marinza following complaints received. The audit revealed widespread tax evasion, resulting in a loss of EUR 30 million to the Albanian state. The company was issued a fine amounting to a total of €90 million. Bankers Petroleum contested the audit results and sought judicial review, with the first two levels of appeal resulting in a favorable outcome for the company. However, in 2022, the Supreme Court overturned the decisions of the two lower courts and made the fine effective. The total fine amounted to €120 million is the highest fine ever imposed on Albania.

However, it has not yet been collected. as the execution of the decision was suspended by the former Minister of Finance, now the Minister of Agriculture, Anila Denaj.

=== Complaints for abuse of dominant position ===
In October 2019 Albania's competition authority launched an in-depth abuse of dominance investigation into Bankers Petroleum. The company told the international news organization Reuters that had “Bankers has never violated free market and competition rules and moreover has abused with any ‘dominant’ position.” According to Reuters, Bankers was reacting to a six-month investigation launched by the Competition Authority into its business from Jan. 1, 2016 to October 2019 to see whether it had abused its dominant position complaints to the regulator from a local refiner. TOSK ENERGJI SH.A. argued that Bankers had either refused to supply it or imposed conditions on its supplies, causing financial costs, particularly related to having to shut down and restart the refinery at Ballsh.
