= Visoka oil field =

Oil field in Visokë, Albania

- Location within Albania
- Country: Albania
- Region: Fier County
- Location: Visokë
- Offshore/onshore: Onshore
- Coordinates: 40.65°N 19.69°E

Field history
- Discovery: 1963
- Start of production: 1964

Production
- Estimated oil in place: 170 million barrels (~2.3×10^{7} t)
- Estimated gas in place: 0.96×10^{9} m^{3} (34×10^{9} cu ft)

Visoka oil field is an Albanian oil field that was discovered in 1963. It is situated near the village of Visokë, northwest of the town of Ballsh. It is one of the biggest on-shore oil field of Albania. It began production in 1964 and produces oil. Its proven reserves are about 170 million barrels (27×10^{6} m^{3}).

== See also ==
- Oil fields of Albania
