= Kolibri Global Energy =

Energy company

Kolibri Global Energy Inc. (TSX: KEI NASDAQ: KGEI) (formerly BNK Petroleum Inc. (TSX: BKX) )is a US focused energy company focused on finding and exploiting large oil and gas reserves. The Company owns and operates a focused oil property concentrated in the Southern SCOOP play/Ardmore basin of Oklahoma. BNK continues to aggressively target growth in production and reserves through the application of new and proven technologies by its team of experts. The Company has corporate office in Newbury Park, California and a registered office in Vancouver, Canada. The company changed its name to Kolibri Global Energy Inc. in November 2020. The company now trades on the Toronto stock exchange under the ticker symbol KEI.TO.

== History ==
The company was spun off as an independent entity from Bankers Petroleum in 2008. In 2010 George Soros's investment fund, Quantum Partners, purchased a 20% stake BNK.
