= Geo-Jade Petroleum =

Chinese oil and gas company

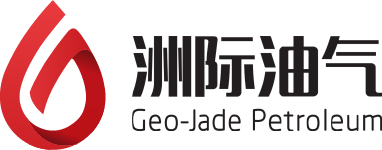
- Company type: Public
- Traded as: SSE: 600759
- Industry: Oil and gas industry
- Founded: October 8, 1996; 29 years ago in Shanghai, China
- Website: www.geojade.com/

Geo-Jade Petroleum is a Chinese oil and gas exploration and production company with oilfields in Kazakhstan, Albania, and Iraq.

The company has made two major acquisitions in 2014–15. In December 2014 it completed the acquisition of 95% of the shares of Maten Petroleum for $526 million. Maten Petroleum's main assets are located in three oil field blocks in production in Kazakhstan, the Matin, Eastern Kokarna and Kara-Arna oil fields. In the other deal, in January 2015 the company announced a $400 million acquisition of Kozhan JSC, an oil producing company in Kazkahstan with rights to develop the Morskoye, Karatal, Dauletally fields in Atyrau Oblast.

The company's stock is listed in the Shanghai Stock Exchange (600759.SH) since October 8, 1996.
