= Ballsh-Hekal oil field =

Oil field in Fier County, Albania

- Location within Albania
- Country: Albania
- Region: Fier County
- Location: Ballsh; Hekal
- Offshore/onshore: Onshore
- Coordinates: 40.58°N 19.74°E
- Operator: Stream Oil & Gas

Field history
- Discovery: 1967
- Start of production: 1967

Production
- Current production of oil: 5,500 barrels per day (~2.7×10^{5} t/a)
- Estimated oil in place: 135 million barrels (~1.84×10^{7} t)
- Estimated gas in place: 1×10^{9} m^{3} (35×10^{9} cu ft)

Ballsh-Hekal oil field is an Albanian oil field that was discovered in 1967, which is also when production from the field started. It is a big on-shore oil field in Albania. Its proven reserves are about 135 million barrels (21.5×10^{6} m^{3}). The Ballsh-Hekal oil field is located 30 kilometres (19 mi) south east of the city of Fier in south central Albania. It produces about 550 barrels per day (87 m^{3}/d).

== See also ==
- Oil fields of Albania
