= Amonicë oil field =

Oil field in Vlorë County, Albania

- Location within Albania
- Country: Albania
- Region: Vlorë County
- Location: Sevaster
- Offshore/onshore: Onshore
- Coordinates: 40°23′55″N 19°40′51″E
- Operator: Q.P.N. Gorrisht, "Albpetrol Sh.A"

Field history
- Discovery: 1980
- Start of production: 1981
- Abandonment: not yet

Production
- Current production of oil: 90 barrels per day (~4,500 t/a)
- Current production of gas: 0E6×10^{0} m^{3}/d 0E6×10^{0} cu ft/d 0×10^{9} m^{3}/a (0×10^{9} cu ft/a)
- Estimated oil in place: 20 million barrels (~2.7×10^{6} t)
- Estimated gas in place: 0.14×10^{9} m^{3} (4.9×10^{9} cu ft)
- Producing formations: chalk rock

Amonicë oil field is an Albanian oil field that was discovered in 1980. It is situated near the village Amonicë, Sevaster municipal unit, Vlorë County. It is one of the biggest on-shore oil field of Albania. It began production in 1981 and produces oil. Its proven reserves are about 20 million barrels (3.2×10^{6} m^{3}).

== See also ==
- Oil fields of Albania
