= Zharrëz =

- Administrative unit
- Location within Albania
- Coordinates: 40°43′N 19°39′E
- Country: Albania
- County: Fier
- Municipality: Patos

Population (2011)
  - Administrative unit: 5,236
- Time zone: UTC+1 (CET)
  - Summer (DST): UTC+2 (CEST)

Zharrëz is a village and a former municipality in the Fier County, southwestern Albania. At the 2015 local government reform it became a subdivision of the municipality Patos. In February 2017, in Zharrez there was a hunger strike, Because the houses of residents were destroyed and they wanted payment. The strike was closed by Niko Peleshi. The population at the 2011 census was 5,236.
