= ARMO oil refiner =

ARMO oil refiner (Albanian Refining and Marketing of Oil) is one of the two oil refiners in Albania. It owned oil refineries at Ballsh and Fier, a research center, 11 depots, a small network of fuel stations, and the Vlorë Terminal located in the south coast on Adriatic sea. Its chief executive was Rezart Taci, who also headed Taçi Oil.

The Ballsh refinery is the largest refinery in Albania and has a designed capacity 1 million tonnes per year. Fier refinery has a capacity of 500 thousand tonnes per year and is designed mainly to produce bitumen.

In 2008, 85% of ARMO shares was sold to the U.S-Swiss consortium Refinery Associates of Texas and Anika Enterprises SA (other companies were involved in initial talks, but did not participate in the purchase) for €128.7 million. Other bids were made by Petrofac, Penta Investments and Vitol.

As of the fall of 2012, ARMO Energy employs over 1,500 people and has a refining capacity of 1.5 million tons with a storage capacity of 220,000 cubic meters. The company later accumulated debts reported at US$595 million by 2016, went bankrupt, and the Ballsh refinery was dismantled for scrap in December 2021.
