= Gorisht-Kocul oil field =

Albanian oil field discovered in 1966

Ballsh-Hekal oil field
- Location within Albania
- Country: Albania
- Region: Vlorë County
- Location: Gorisht; Kocul
- Offshore/onshore: Onshore
- Coordinates: 40.45°N 19.65°E
- Operator: Stream Oil & Gas

Field history
- Discovery: 1966
- Start of production: 1966

Production
- Current production of oil: 925 barrels per day (~46,100 t/a)
- Estimated oil in place: 256 million barrels (~3.49×10^{7} t)
- Estimated gas in place: 1.44×10^{9} m^{3} (51×10^{9} cu ft)

Gorisht-Kocul oil field is an Albanian oil field that was discovered in 1966 and started production the same year. It is one of the big on-shore oil fields in Albania. The Gorisht-Kocul oil field is located east of the city of Vlorë in southern Albania. Its proven reserves are about 256 million barrels (40.7×10^{6} m^{3}). It produces about 925 barrels per day (147.1 m^{3}/d).

== See also ==
- Oil fields of Albania
