= Visoka, Kardzhali Province =

Visoka
- Village
- Location within Bulgaria
- Coordinates: 41.7167°N 25.2333°E
- Country: Bulgaria
- Province: Kardzhali Province
- Municipality: Kardzhali
- Time zone: UTC+2 (EET)
  - Summer (DST): UTC+3 (EEST)

Visoka is a village in the Kardzhali Municipality, which is in the Kardzhali Province, in southern Bulgaria. As of 1 January 2007, the population of Visoka is 2 people, making it one of the least populated villages in the Kardzhali Municipality.
