= Alsat =

- Type: Generalist channel
- Country: North Macedonia
- Broadcast area: North Macedonia; Albania; Kosovo; Slovenia
- Headquarters: Skopje, North Macedonia

Programming
- Languages: Albanian, Macedonian

Ownership
- Owner: VeVe Group
- Parent: Alsat Media Group
- Sister channels: Albanian Screen (formerly)

History
- Launched: March 1, 2006
- Founder: Vebi Velija
- Former names: Alsat-M

Links
- Website: alsat.mk

Availability

Terrestrial
- Boom TV: Channel 006

Alsat National Television, (Note: Albanian: Televizioni Kombëtar Alsat; Macedonian: Национална телевизија Алсат, Nacionalna televizija Alsat.) or simply Alsat (short for "Albanian Satellite") is a generalist television channel that broadcasts throughout the territory of North Macedonia and other Balkan countries. Its programming is transmitted mainly in Albanian and occasionally in Macedonian, based on the European concepts of information that aim to foster multi-ethnic coexistence in North Macedonia. Alsat has a dynamic range of programming that covers: news, politics, economy, entertainment, music, sports, movies, series and documentaries.

== History ==
It was founded on March 1, 2006, as Alsat-M by Albanian businessman Vebi Velija, as a sister to the former Alsat (then Albanian Screen).

== Programming ==
=== Original programming ===
- Ditë e re
- Pasdite me Alsat
- 360 gradë
- Pasqyra e shëndetit
- Rruga drejt
- Bota e re
- Magazina ekonomike
- Pro Sports
- Programi 200
- Super sfida
- Hallkit
- Të gatuajmë me Alsat
- Pizzicato
- Carpe Diem
- Të gatuajmë për mysafirët
- Flitet se
- Rajoni
- Kënaqësia e gatimit
- Emisioni 5+
- Shpuza Show
- Busted
