= National Agency of Natural Resources (Albania) =

Government agency of Albania

- Agjencia Kombëtare e Burimeve Natyrore
- Official logo

Natural Resources agency overview
- Formed: 9 August 2006
- Jurisdiction: Albania
- Headquarters: Tirana
- Natural Resources agency executive: Erlind Sulo, Executive Director
- Website: www.akbn.gov.al

The National Agency of Natural Resources (AKBN; Albanian: Agjencia Kombëtare e Burimeve Natyrore) is a government agency that supervises and monitors the use of natural resources in Albania. Its purpose is to maintain the interests of the State in the fields of hydrocarbons, minerals and energy. The agency oversees the development and rational use of natural resources and monitors their post-use.
