= Taçi Oil =

- Type: Oil company
- Industry: Crude Oil exploration, production, manufacture and marketing
- Founded: June 19, 2003; 23 years ago
- Headquarters: Tirana, Albania
- Key people: Rezart Taçi
- Products: Petroleum product
- Revenue: €350 million (2012)
- Website: taci-oil.com

Taçi Oil is an Albanian petroleum company and oil distributor in Albania headquartered in Tirana.

The company's revenue for 2012 was €350 million. and had over 290 petrol stations through Albania and over 850 employees.

== History ==
Rezart Taçi entered the Albanian fuel market in 2003, when he established Taçi Oil, which initially operated from the port of Shëngjin in northern Albania. The company was entered in the Albanian business register on 19 June 2003 as a joint-stock company with Taçi as sole shareholder.

In 2009, Taçi Oil purchased the Albanian oil refinery ARMO (Anika Mercuria Refinery Associated Oil, owned by Anika Enterprises) for €128 million.

On September 9, 2011, Taci Oil became an official sponsor of AC Milan. Beginning in 2008, in fact, Taci Oil was the main sponsor of Milan Junior Camp in Tirana. Since its founding, the camp has hosted about 1,400 Albanian youths.

By 2013 the group was heavily indebted, including an unpaid loan of €75 million from the Bank of Azerbaijan. In August 2013 the Albanian government approved the sale of 70 per cent of ARMO to Heaney Assets Corporation, an Azerbaijani-linked company registered in the British Virgin Islands. Heaney paid €35 million for Taçi's stake in AMRA Oil and almost €15 million for minority stakes in several other companies he controlled, among them Europetrol, Taçi Oil and Kuid. Company register documents recorded the transfer of an 80 per cent stake in ARMO, with the Ministry of Economy and Energy retaining 15 per cent.

The Prosecution Office of Tirana later charged Taçi, as former administrator of ARMO, with non-payment of taxes amounting to one billion lek over the period 2009 to 2013, stating that while ARMO claimed to be insolvent he had lent money from the refinery to Taçi Oil and withdrawn cash for his own purposes. Separately, in December 2013 the Directorate of Economic and Financial Crime filed charges of tax evasion, fraud, forgery of official documents, undeclared income and money laundering. He was convicted in December 2016 and fined €390,000, then acquitted on appeal in September 2017 and again in October 2019. ARMO's accumulated debts reached $595 million by 2016, and the Ballsh refinery was sold for scrap in 2021.

== See also ==
- Economy of Albania
