= Patos-Marinza Oil Field =

Albanian oil field

Coordinates: 40°44′N 19°39′E

Patos Marinëz
- Location within Albania
- Country: Albania
- Region: Fier County
- Location: Patos
- Block: Patos-Marinëz
- Offshore/onshore: Onshore
- Operator: Bankers Petroleum, Albpetrol

Field history
- Discovery: 1928/ Ina
- Start of production: 2004

Production
- Current production of oil: medium-heavy oil t/a (12.556 bbl/d or 1.9962 m^{3}/d)
- Estimated oil in place: 1.500 million barrels (~2.046×10^{5} t)
- Producing formations: sandstone

Patos-Marinëz is an Albanian oil field that was discovered in 1928 and became operational in 1930. It is the biggest on-shore oil field in Europe, and with its 11,854 barrels (1,884.6 m^{3}) per day the biggest oil producing field in Albania. The Patos Marinëz oil field is located 10 kilometres (6 mi) east of the city of Fier in south central Albania. Its proven reserves are about 2 billion barrels (320×10^{6} m^{3}). Patos Marinëz has only heavy oil and is in production since the 1930s.

== Statistics ==
- Contingent resource for 2010 is 1.2 billion barrels (190,000,000 m^{3}), compared to 838 million barrels (133,200,000 m^{3}) in 2009
- Prospective resource for 2010 is 568 million barrels (90,300,000 m^{3}), compared to 384 million barrels (61,100,000 m^{3}) in 2009

== See also ==
- Kuçova oil field
- Oil fields of Albania
