= Kuçovë =

- Municipality
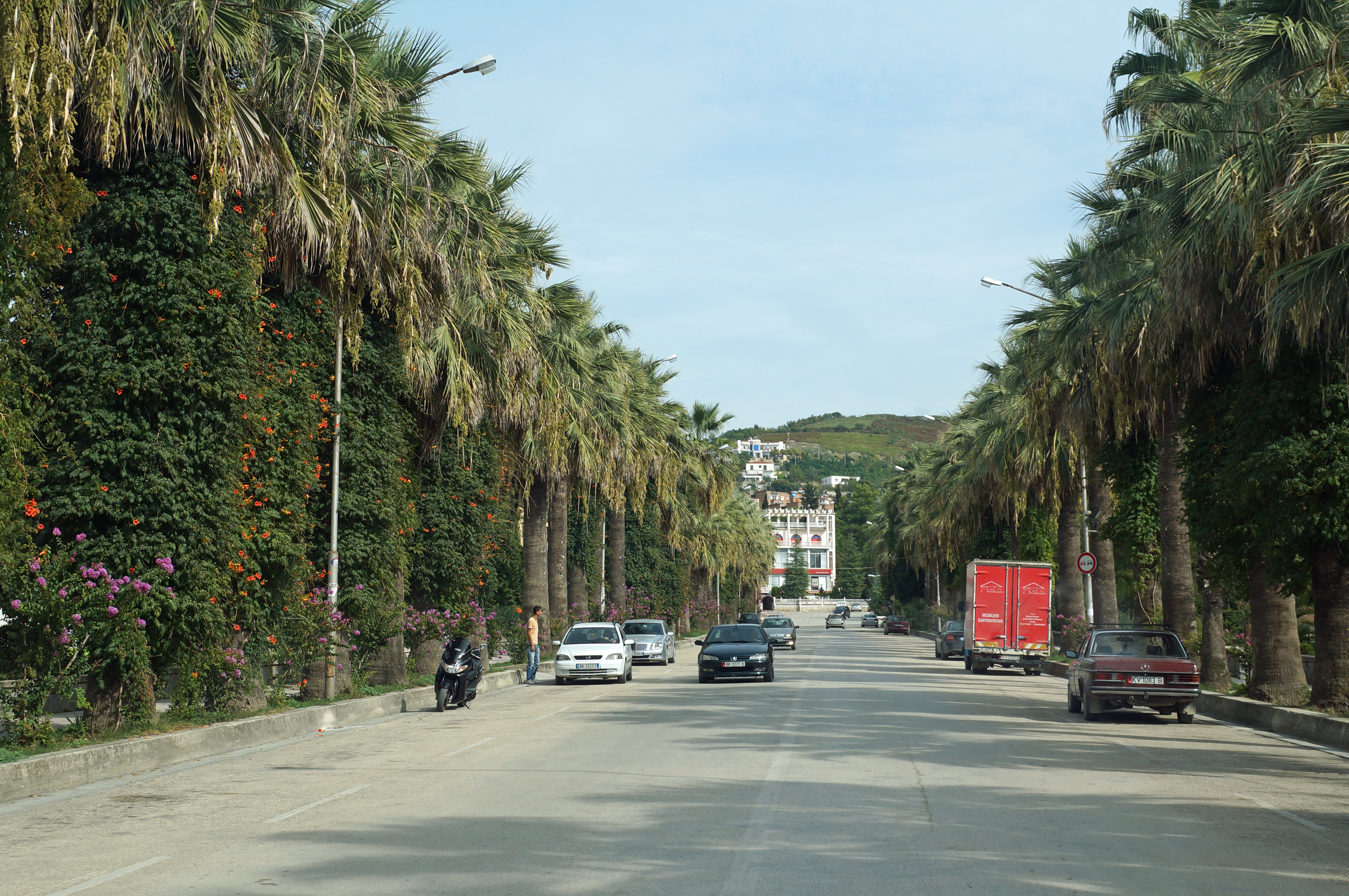
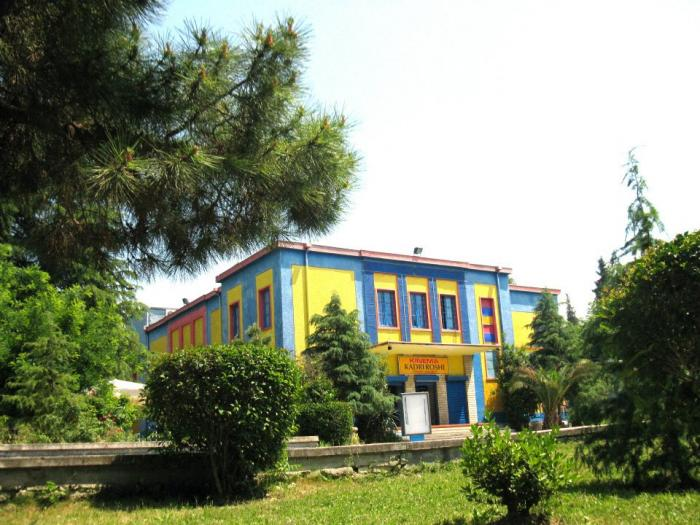
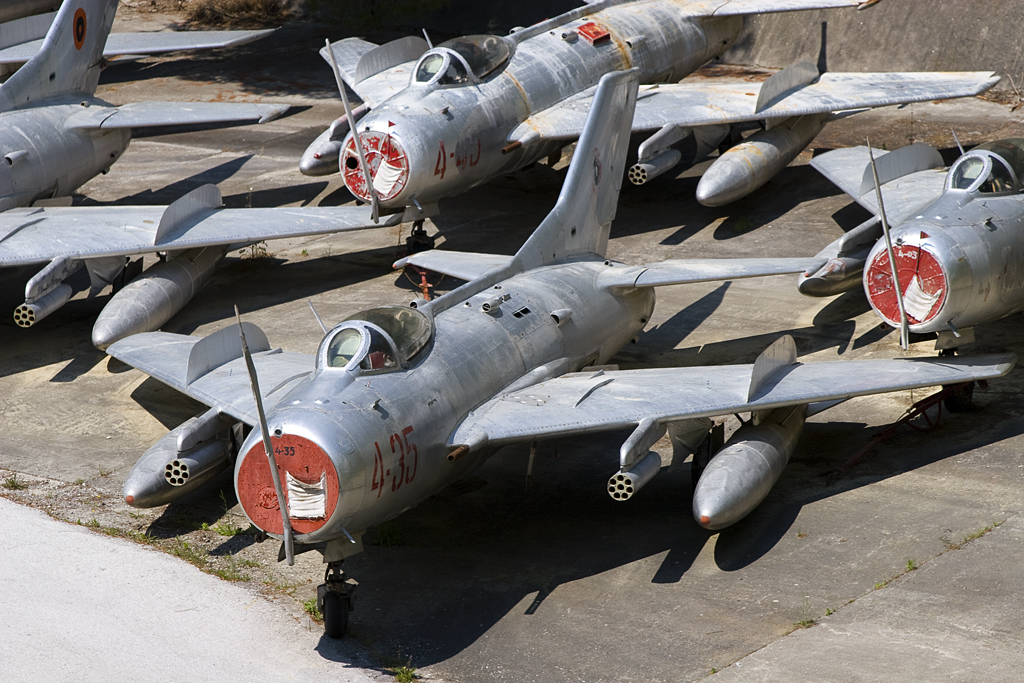
- From the top, Boulevard leading to the main square in downtown Kuçovë, Kuçovë Cinema, Shenyang F-6 Fighter jets at Kuçovë Aerodrome

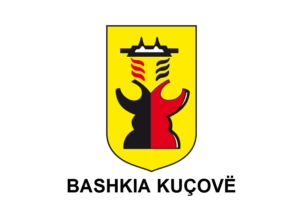
- Flag Emblem

- Location within Albania
- Coordinates: 40°48′14″N 19°54′52″E
- Country: Albania
- County: Berat

Government
  - Mayor: Kreshnik Hajdari (PS)

Area
  - Municipality: 160.33 km^{2} (61.90 sq mi)
  - Administrative unit: 2.73 km^{2} (1.05 sq mi)
- Elevation: 50 m (160 ft)

Population (2023)
  - Municipality: 31,077
  - Municipality density: 193.83/km^{2} (502.02/sq mi)
  - Administrative unit: 12,629
  - Administrative unit density: 4,630/km^{2} (12,000/sq mi)
- Time zone: UTC+1 (CET)
  - Summer (DST): UTC+2 (CEST)
- Postal Code: 5301-5304
- Area Code: (0)311
- Website: bashkiakucove.gov.al

Kuçovë (Albanian definite form: Kuçova) is a municipality in south-central Albania. It was formed at the 2015 local government reform by the merger of the former municipalities Kozare, Kuçovë, Lumas and Perondi, which all became municipal units. The seat of the municipality is the town of Kuçovë. The total population is 31,077 as of the 2023 census, in a total area of 160.33 km^{2} (61.90 sq mi). The population of the municipal unit as of the 2023 census is 12,629.

== History ==
=== Ancient ===
Archaeologists found in the village of Katundas near Kuçovë six phases of inhabitation dating to the Neolithic, Chalcolithic, Bronze Age, Iron Age, urban Illyrian and the Late Antiquity era.

=== Modern ===
Kuçova has been an industrial city since the Italian influence in the early 1920s. The first oil hole in Albania was drilled in 1928 in “Dikatër”, establishing the Kuçova oil field. From this moment onwards the city has been on oil maps, housing workers and their families. Since 1928, the Italian company AIPA had an agreement with the Zog I government that if the oil extraction would surpass 50,000 tonnes per year, this company would build a refinery in Albania. In 1939 Albania was occupied by Italians and therefore, though the oil extracted was more than 170,000 ton, the refinery was never built and the oil was transported to Italy.

=== Stalin City ===
During Communist Albania the city was renamed to Stalin City (Albanian: Qyteti Stalin) and was a closed military district. The city was extensively developed in the 1950s and is of interest to students of communist architecture, although following the collapse of communism there has been much unauthorised building and modification to the original buildings.

=== Military airbase ===
It is home to the Kuçovë Air Base of the Albanian Air Force. Since 2005 the country's air force has ceased flying the aged MiG fighters provided by the Soviet Union and China and has been reduced to rotary wing aircraft only. The airfield was refloated in 2024 as NATO-airbase in the context of the ongoing NATO-expansion into Eastern Europe.

== Climate ==
Climate data for Kuçovë
Month	Jan	Feb	Mar	Apr	May	Jun	Jul	Aug	Sep	Oct	Nov	Dec	Year
Record high °C (°F)	22.0 (71.6)	28.6 (83.5)	29.6 (85.3)	32.6 (90.7)	37.0 (98.6)	41.0 (105.8)	44.0 (111.2)	42.0 (107.6)	38.4 (101.1)	35.2 (95.4)	31.8 (89.2)	29.0 (84.2)	44.0 (111.2)
Mean daily maximum °C (°F)	14.2 (57.6)	16.3 (61.3)	18.7 (65.7)	21.9 (71.4)	26.2 (79.2)	31.5 (88.7)	34.0 (93.2)	34.9 (94.8)	30.8 (87.4)	25.5 (77.9)	20.3 (68.5)	16.5 (61.7)	24.2 (75.6)
Daily mean °C (°F)	8.2 (46.8)	10.0 (50.0)	12.1 (53.8)	15.3 (59.5)	19.4 (66.9)	23.8 (74.8)	26.2 (79.2)	26.4 (79.5)	23.5 (74.3)	18.2 (64.8)	14.1 (57.4)	10.8 (51.4)	17.3 (63.2)
Mean daily minimum °C (°F)	2.1 (35.8)	3.8 (38.8)	6.9 (44.4)	8.6 (47.5)	12.6 (54.7)	16.1 (61.0)	18.3 (64.9)	18.0 (64.4)	16.2 (61.2)	11.0 (51.8)	7.9 (46.2)	5.1 (41.2)	10.6 (51.0)
Record low °C (°F)	−11.2 (11.8)	−5.8 (21.6)	−5.0 (23.0)	−1.4 (29.5)	5.2 (41.4)	6.8 (44.2)	12.0 (53.6)	10.4 (50.7)	1.6 (34.9)	0.0 (32.0)	−2.2 (28.0)	−6.8 (19.8)	−11.2 (11.8)
Average precipitation mm (inches)	89.9 (3.54)	69.3 (2.73)	70.9 (2.79)	57.3 (2.26)	69.6 (2.74)	41.4 (1.63)	19.1 (0.75)	22.1 (0.87)	57.3 (2.26)	76.8 (3.02)	94.7 (3.73)	81.2 (3.20)	749.6 (29.52)
Average precipitation days (≥ 0.1 mm)	11.2	10.4	11.2	9.5	9.4	6.6	3.4	3.7	6.8	8.3	10.6	9.5	100.6
Average snowy days	0.4	0.3	0	0.1	0	0	0	0	0	0.1	0	0	0.9
Source: MeteoManz (May 2011- June 2025)

== Economy ==
Kuçova is one of Albania's cities known for its oil industry along with Patos-Marinza Oil Field and Ballsh-Hekal oil field. The oil industry was originally developed by the Italians during the King Zog period, and much of the infrastructure is outdated. Following the end of the communist period, the town suffered a severe industrial decline, with the closure of many factories and the destruction of the town’s power plant in the 1997 riots following the failure of the pyramid banks. Today there is some evidence of a recovery with a large number of micro-businesses operating from former state run factories, although unemployment remains high. There are also a number of foreign owned banks and a small number of ATMs. Like many towns in Albania many young people immigrate abroad to seek employment.

== Population ==
Historical population
Year	Pop.	±%
1950	1,585	—
1960	10,337	+552.2%
1969	14,000	+35.4%
1979	17,200	+22.9%
1989	21,709	+26.2%
2001	18,038	−16.9%
2011	12,654	−29.8%
2023	12,629	−0.2%

As of the 2023 census, Kuçova municipality has a population of about 31,000. Of this population around 12,000 live in the city of Kuçova, classifying it as 12th of 65 municipalities on a national scale. Population density is 567 inhabitants/km^{2}, which ranks the Kuçova district as the most heavily populated on a national scale. Another feature of this district compared with others in Albania is that city dwellers comprise 63% of the general population, the remainder living in villages nearby.

The city of Kuçova has 5 neighbourhoods (Albanian: lagje), Lgj. "11 Janari", Lgj. "Llukan Prifti", Lgj."11 Shkurti", Lgj. "Tafil Skendo", and "1 Maji". One of the largest parks in Kuçovë is called "Pishat" (The Pines). Like many other Albanian cities, Kuçova has a lot of coffee bars, restaurants and some hotels.

== Education ==
There are two public high schools in the city, General High School (Shkolla e Mesme e Përgjithshme) "Myrteza Kepi" and General High School Kuçovë (Shkolla e Mesme e Përgjithshme Kucovë) and one non public high school. There are also five 1st to 9th grade schools; "18 Tetori", "28 Nentori", "Gaqi Karakashi", "23 Nentori" and "Deshmorët e Kombit". High school graduates who want to pursue a higher education go to other Albanian cities or outside the country.

== Sports ==
The football club is KF Naftëtari Kuçovë, currently playing in the Albanian Second Division. Their stadium is Bashkim Sulejmani Stadium with a capacity of 5,000 spectators.

== Twin towns – sister cities ==
Kuçovë is twinned with:

- Ramla, Israel

== Municipal Council ==
Seat distribution in the Municipal Council

Following the 2023 local elections, the composition of the Council of Kuçovë is as follows:

Name	Abbr.	Seats
Socialist Party of Albania; Partia Socialiste e Shqipërisë	PS	18
Together We Win; Bashkë Fitojmë	BF	8
Democratic Party of Albania artia Demokratike e Shqipërisë	PR	3
Social Democratic Party of Albania; Partia Socialdemokrate e Shqipërisë	PSD	1
Democratic Alliance Party; Partia Aleanca Demokratike	PAD	1

== Notable people ==
- Ilir Bozhiqi (born 22 May 1965), retired Albanian football goalkeeper.
- Eltjon Valle (born 1984) artist, born in Kuçova.
- Dr. Flori (Florian Kondi) (1979 – 2014) famous Albanian singer who was a part of West Side Family.
- Agim Shuka (1942 – 1992), a famous Albanian film and stage actor, born in Kuçova.
- Orli Shuka (born 1976) is a British-Albanian actor best known for his role as Luan, head of the Albanian mafia in Gangs of London. He is the son of Albanian actor Agim Shuka.
- Toli Shuka, head of the anti fascist forces in Kuçovë for LANÇ, he is the uncle of Agim Shuka.
- Nelson Weiper, a footballer for Mainz 05 football club in Germany whose mother is from Kuçovë.
- Ardit Jaupaj (born 1996), Albanian footballer born in Kuçovë.
- Anastas Kondo (1937 – 2006) was an Albanian writer, screenwriter, and micropaleontologist.
