= Lumas =

- Administrative unit
- Location within Albania
- Coordinates: 40°50′N 20°0′E
- Country: Albania
- County: Berat
- Municipality: Kuçovë

Population (2011)
  - Administrative unit: 3,981
- Time zone: UTC+1 (CET)
  - Summer (DST): UTC+2 (CEST)

Lumas is a village and former municipality in Berat County, central Albania. With the 2015 local government reform, it became a subdivision of the municipality of Kuçovë. The population at the 2011 census was 3,981.
