= Lists of Albanians =

This is a list of historical and living Albanians (including ethnic Albanians and people of full or partial Albanian ancestry) who are famous or notable, sorted by occupation and alphabetically.

== Religious ==
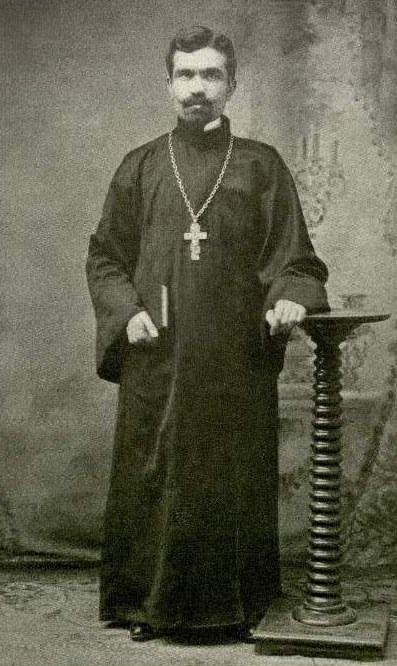
Fan Noli, champion of literature, history, theology, diplomacy, journalism, music, and national unity.

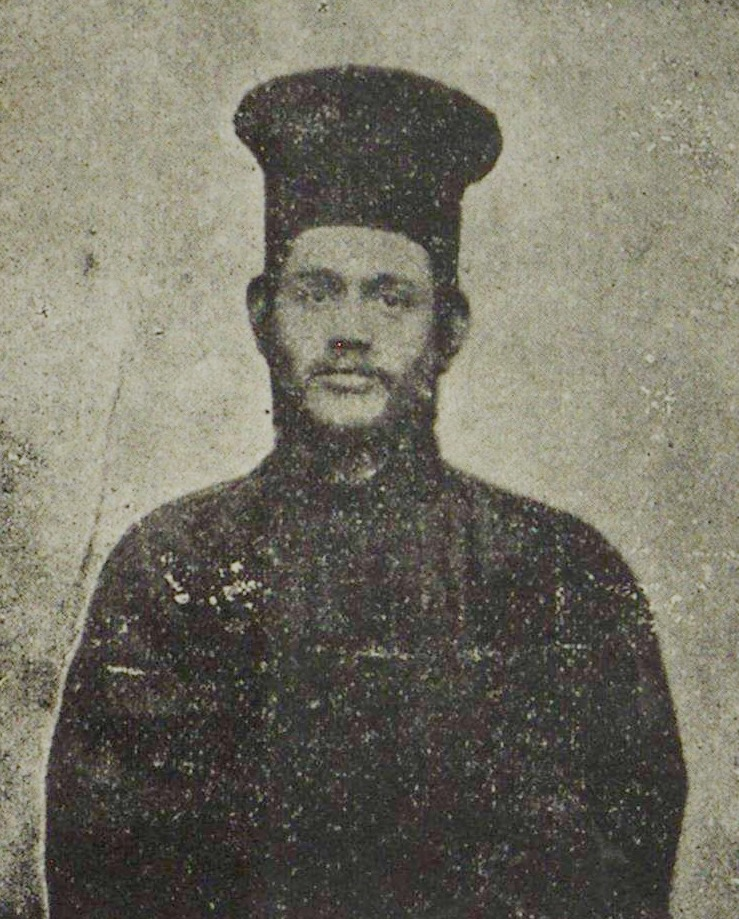
Kristo Negovani, religious leader and writer for the Albanian cause.

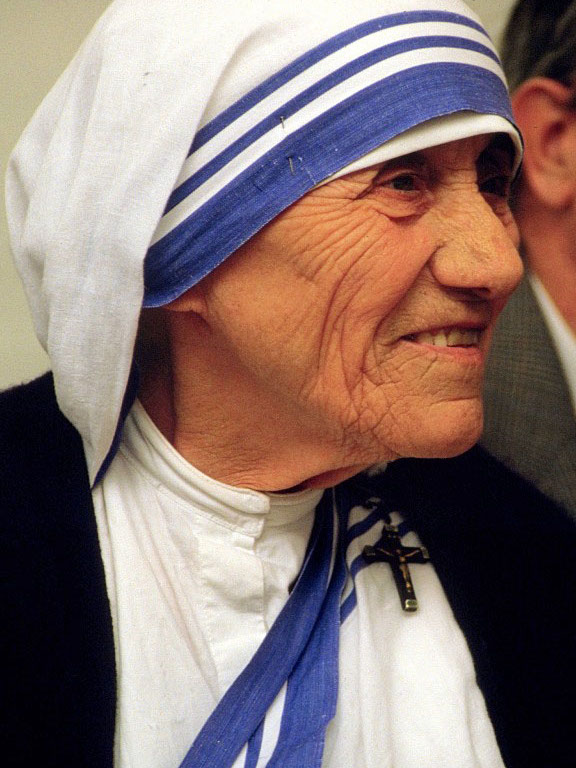
Holy Mother Teresa.

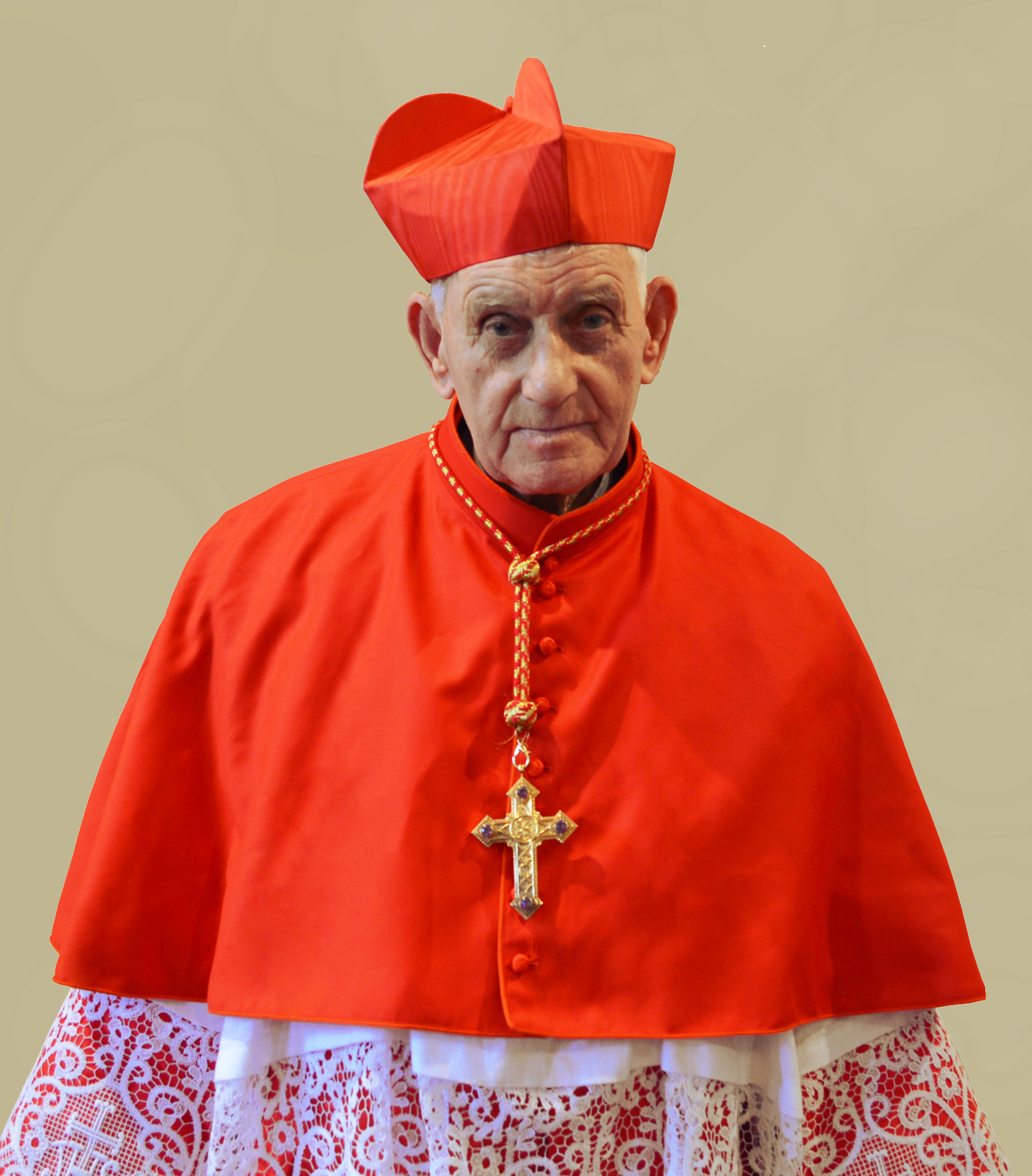
Ernest Simoni, cardinal and presbyter.

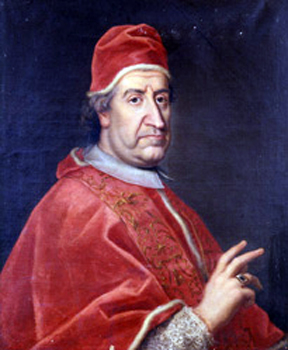
Pope Clement XI

=== Priests ===
- Dhimitër Frëngu (1443 – 1525), friar and scholar of a noble family, treasurer and councilor of Giorgio Castriota, in 1480 wrote the first biography, in Latin, on the life of Skanderbeg, from which all later writers drew.
- Father Marin Barleti (1450 – 1513), Catholic ecclesiastic and writer, author of the life of Skanderbeg.
- Gjon Buzuku (1499 – 1577), bishop Catholic, author of the oldest known document in Albanian: a translation of the Roman Missal, "Meshari" (1555).
- Pjetër Budi (1565 – 1622), Catholic priest and writer, published three books in Albanian and I leave several poems in his native language.
- Papa Luca Matranga (1567 – 1619), priest and scholar, author of the first literary expression arbëresh of the Albanians in diaspora.
- Frang Bardhi (1606 – 1644), Catholic bishop, lexicographer, folklorist and ethnographer, author of the first dictionary of the Albanian language known so far.
- Pjetër Bogdani (1630 – 1689), Catholic bishop and writer, author of the first Albanian work in prose.
- Papa Nikollë Filja (1691 – 1769), priest and writer.
- Nicoleta Kenini (2005-), writer and priest
- Mons. Giuseppe Crispi (1781 – 1859), one of the major figures of the Arbëresh community of Sicily of that era, wrote a number of works on the Albanian language.
- Papa Francesco Antonio Santori (1819 – 1894), writer, poet and playwright.
- Nikoll Kaçorri (1862 – 1917), Catholic religious, politician and patriot, deputy prime minister with Ismail Kemal, in the first Albanian government (1912–1913).
- Gjergj Fishta (1871 – 1940), Franciscan friar, poet, politician and translator.
- Mons. Theofan Stilian Noli (1882 – 1965), bishop and intellectual, writer, scholar, diplomat, politician, historian, orator, founder of the Orthodox Church of Albania.
- Papa Marco La Piana (1883 – 1958), priest and scholar, gave his contribute through his studies on Albanian language.
- Anton Harapi (1888 – 1946), Franciscan friar, teacher, writer and politician.
- Zef Valentini (1900 – 1979), Italian Jesuit, albanologist, byzantinist and historian, naturalized Albanian.
- Cyril of Bulgaria (1901 – 1971), the first Patriarch of the Bulgarian Patriarchate, born of an Albanian family.
- Father Zef Pllumi (1924 – 2007), Franciscan priest and writer, author of the memoirs of Christian religious persecution in Albania.
- Mons. Ercole Lupinacci (1933 – 2016), Bishop of Italo-Albanian Catholic Eparchies of Piana degli Albanesi and Lungro.
- Mons. Sotir Ferrara (1937 – 2017), the Bishop of the Eparchy of Piana degli Albanesi, a diocese of the Italo-Albanian Catholic Church in Sicily, Italy.
- Papa Eleuterio Francesco Fortino (1938 – 2010), priest of the Italo-Albanian Catholic Church, Archimandrite in the Eparchy of Lungro in Calabria, served as the Under Secretary of the Pontifical Council for Promoting Christian Unity and albanolog.
- Arch. Rrok Kola Mirdita (1939 – 2015), Catholic archbishop.
- Mons. Angelo Massafra (born 1949), metropolitan archbishop of Scutari-Pult and president of the Albanian Episcopal Conference.
- Mons. Donato Oliverio (born 1956), Bishop of the Eparchy of Lungro.
- Muhammad Nasiruddin al-Albani, Islamic scholar (specialising in the field of Hadith sciences) and Muslim revivalist in the 20th century. He is well known for his anti-extremist leanings all over the Muslim world.

=== Martyrs ===
- Papa Kristo Negovani (1875 – 1905), religious leader and writer for the Albanian cause.
- Father Daniel Dajani (1906 – 1946), Jesuit religious and martyr, of the Catholic Church, killed by the regime during the communist dictatorship in Albania.
- Stath Melani (1858-1917) was an Albanian Orthodox priest who participated in the Congress of Manastir and helped spread awareness of the Albanian written language in southern Albania.

=== Pope ===
- Pope Clement XI (1649 – 1721), Pope of the Catholic Church.

=== Saints and blessed ===
- Saint Papa Josif Papamihali (1912 – 1948), priest of Byzantine rite, formed in the Albanian communities of Italy, martyr of the Albanian Greek-Catholic Church, arrested, sentenced to forced labor, and killed during the communist dictatorship in Albania.
- Saint Mother Teresa (1910 – 1997), Roman Catholic religious and missionary.
- Saint Astius (2nd century AD), bishop of Dyrrhachium, martyr and saint venerated by the Roman Catholic and Eastern Orthodox churches.
- Saint Pelinus (c. 620 – 5 December 662), native of Dyrrhachium and later Bishop of Brindisi in Italy.
- Saint Angelina of Serbia (1440–1520), the Albanian Despotess consort of Serbian Despot Stefan Branković (r. 1458–1459), and a daughter of Albanian nobleman Gjergj Arianiti. She was proclaimed a saint and venerated as such by the Serbian Orthodox Church.
- Saint John Koukouzelis (1300–c. 1350) recognized as a saint by the Eastern Orthodox Church.
- Saints Eleutherius and Antia venerated as Christian saints and martyrs in Greece and Albania by both the Catholic Church and the Eastern Orthodox Church.
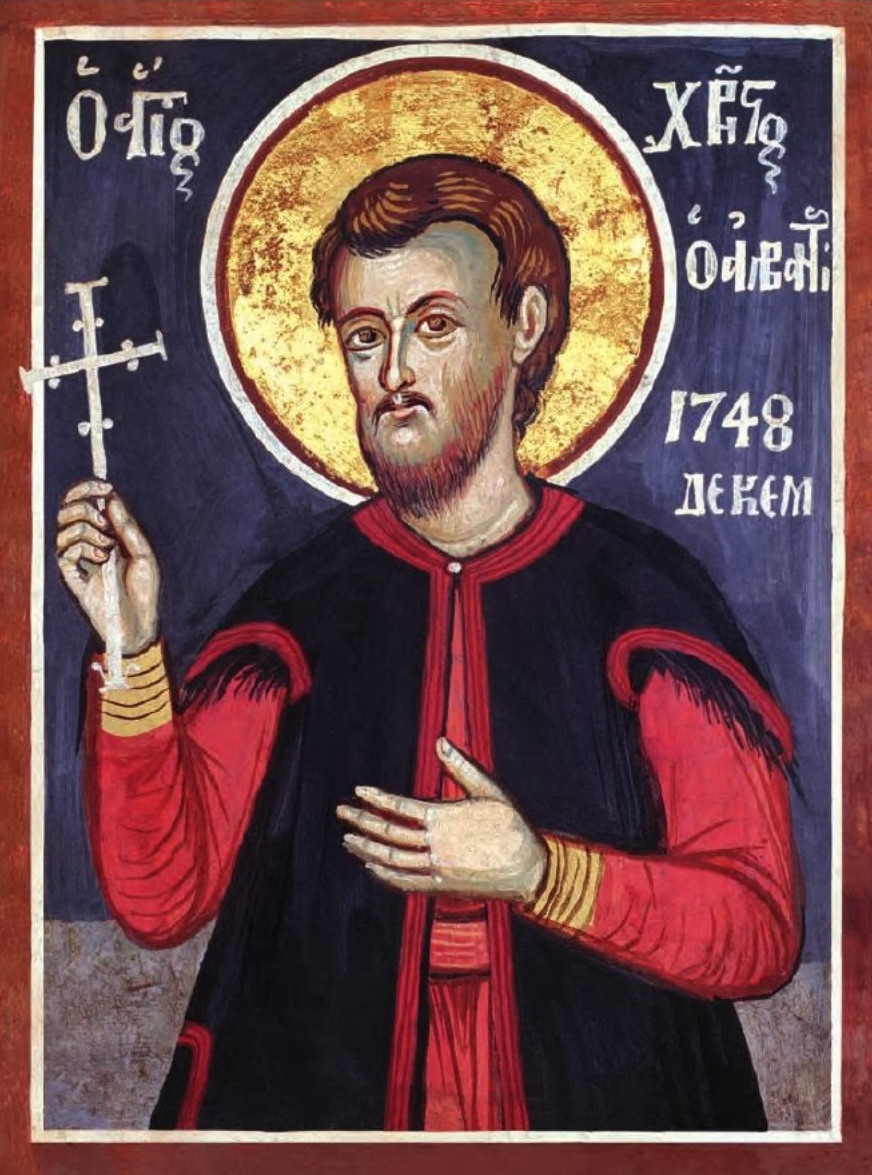
  Fresco of Saint Christos the gardener.
  Saint Christos the Arvanid Saint Christos the Arvanid or the gardener (Albanian: Shën Kristo Kopshtari) was an 18th-century Eastern Orthodox saint from Albania.
- Therinus (Albanian: Terin, Greek: Θερινός), also known as Therius of Buthrotum, was a Christian saint revered in Albania.
- Nicodemus of Elbasan The new martyr Nicodems also known as Nicodemus of Berat (Albanian: Shën Nikodhimi i Beratit) was born in Vithkuq in present-day Albania. He was married and had children there. Later he converted to Islam and then became a Christian again, at Mount Athos, Greece. After three years he decided to return in his native town, informing the Muslim authorities of his decision. He was beheaded on 11 July 1722. His relics are venerated in Berat.
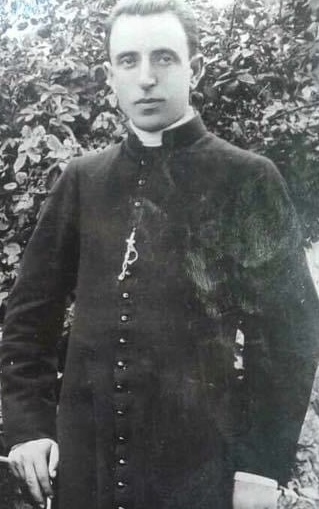
  Photo of Shtjefën Kurti.
  Nephon II of Constantinople (Greek: Νήφων; died 11 August 1508), born Nicholas (Νικόλαος), was Ecumenical Patriarch of Constantinople three times: from 1486 to 1488, from 1497 to 1498 and for a short time in 1502. He is honored as a saint in the Eastern Orthodox Church and his feast day is August 11.
- Shtjefën Kurti (24 December 1898 – 20 October 1971) was an Albanian Roman Catholic priest killed during a period of communist persecution.
- Çiprian Nika, OFM (Shkodër, 19 July 1900 – 11 March 1948) was an Albanian Catholic priest, Franciscan, teacher, and publicist.
- Saint Laura of Constantinople (died 1453) was a Christian who lived in Constantinople during the 15th century. She was born in Greece into a noble family: her father was a Latin knight named Michael and her mother was Albanian. Her name was Theodolinde Trasci. After she became a nun in Constantinople, she changed it into Laura, eventually rising to become an abbess. She was martyred by the Ottoman Turks who took Constantinople on 29 May 1453. They scalded her to death with the other 52 sisters of her convent.
- Bernardin Palaj (20 October 1894 — 8 December 1947) was an Albanian Franciscan friar, folklorist and poet.
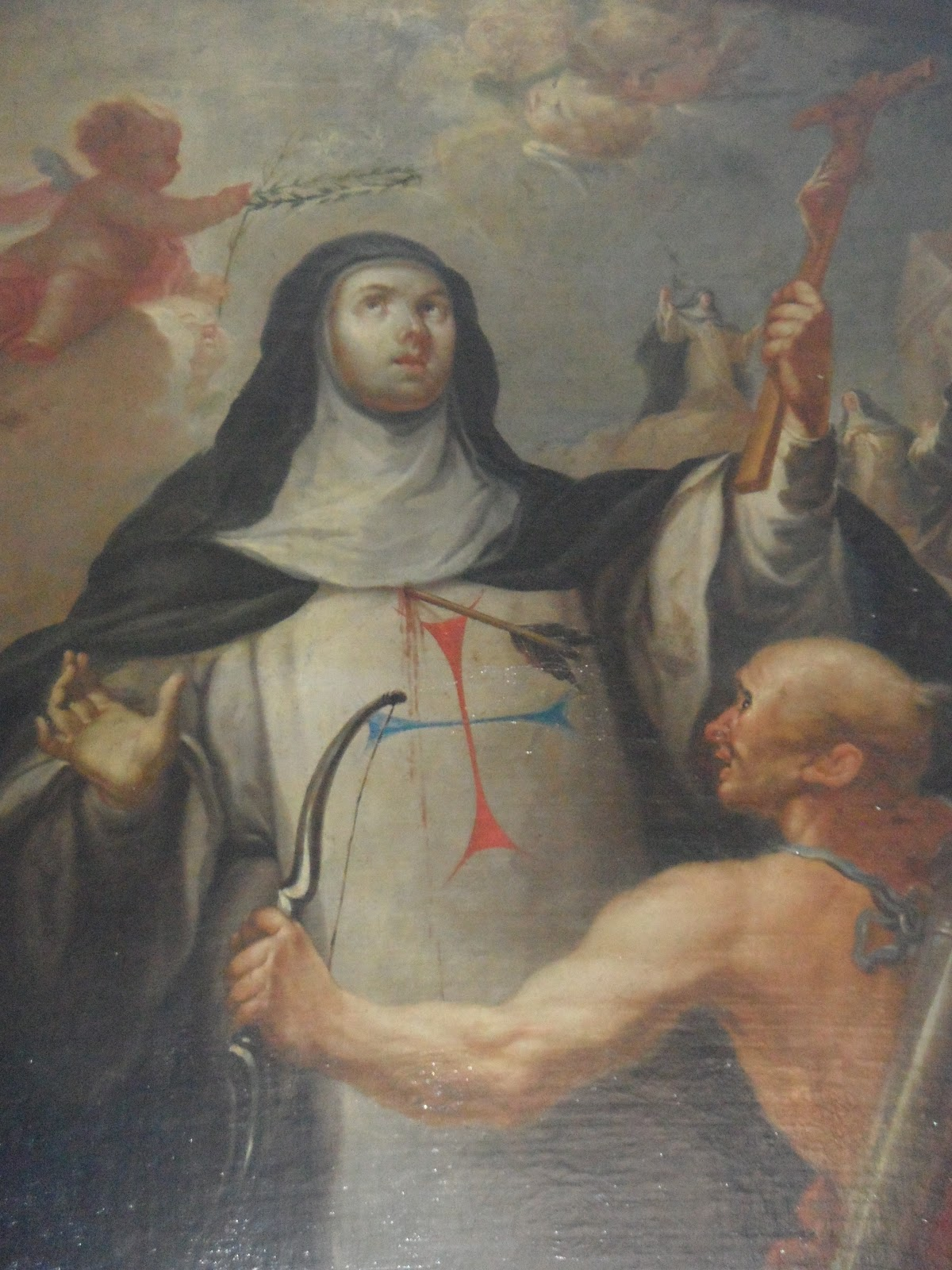
  Painting of St. Laura of Constantinople
  Vinçenc Prennushi (born Nikoll Prendushi, 4 September 1885 – 19 March 1949) was an Albanian Roman Catholic professed member from the Order of Friars Minor and he served as the Archbishop of Durrës from 1940 until his death.
- Qerim Sadiku (12 February 1919 – 4 March 1946) was a Catholic Albanian blessed who had converted from Islam. He was executed by a firing squad in Shkodër along with clerics Danjel Dajani, Giovanni Fausti, Gjon Shllaku, Mark Çuni and Gjelosh Lulashi.
- Lazër Shantoja (7 July 1891 – 5 March 1945) was an Albanian blessed, publicist, poet, satirist, and translator into Albanian from Goethe, Schiller and Leopardi, as well as his country's first Esperantist.
- Alfons Tracki (2 December 1896 – 18 July 1946) was an Albanian Catholic priest of German origin, who died as a martyr as a result of the religious persecution by the regime of Enver Hoxha in communist Albania.
- Maria Tuci was an Albanian laywoman and Roman Catholic martyr from Lezhë who was imprisoned and died in Shkodra.

== Literature ==
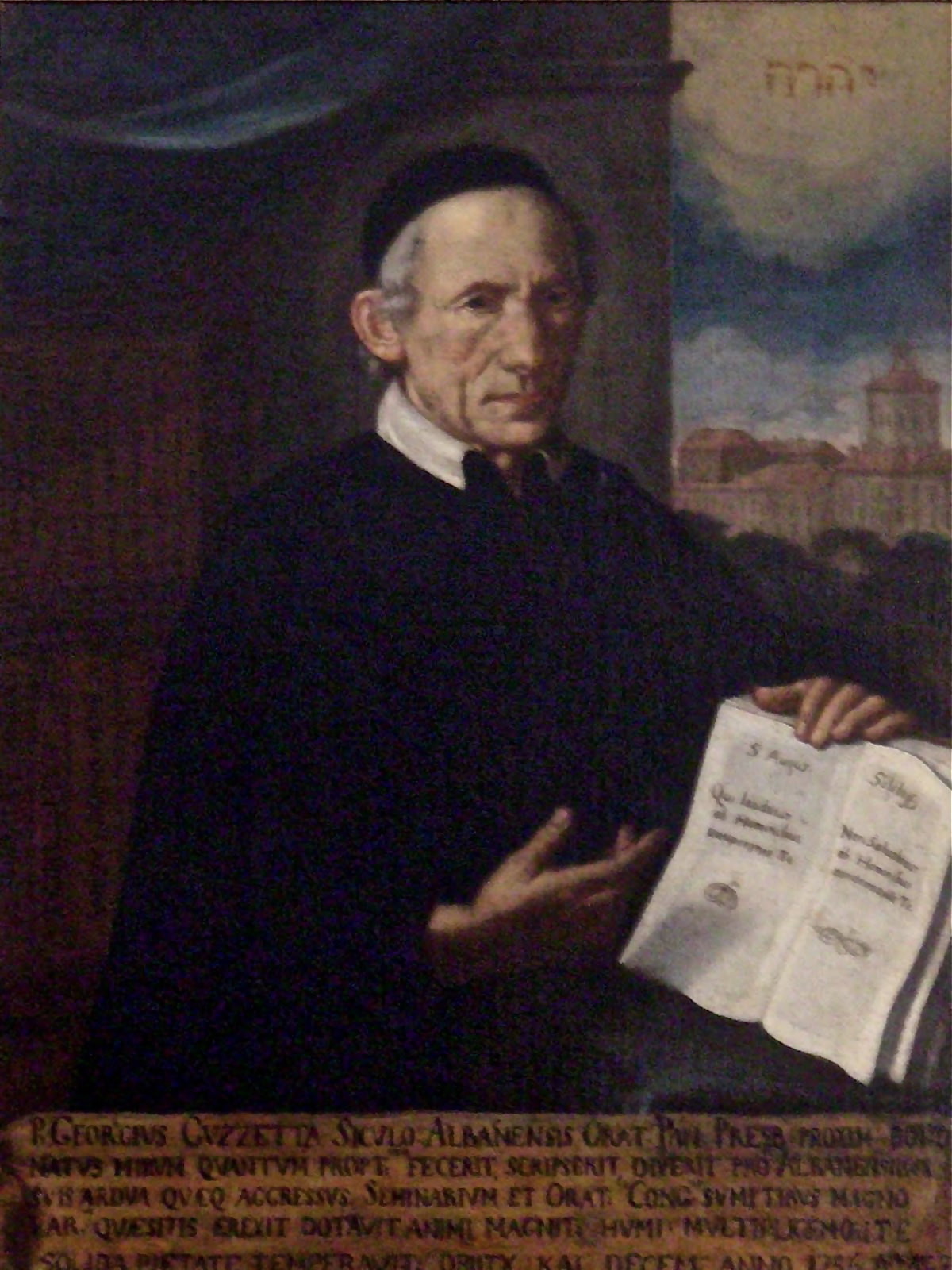
Blessed P. Giorgio Guzzetta, Apostle of the Albanians of Sicily.

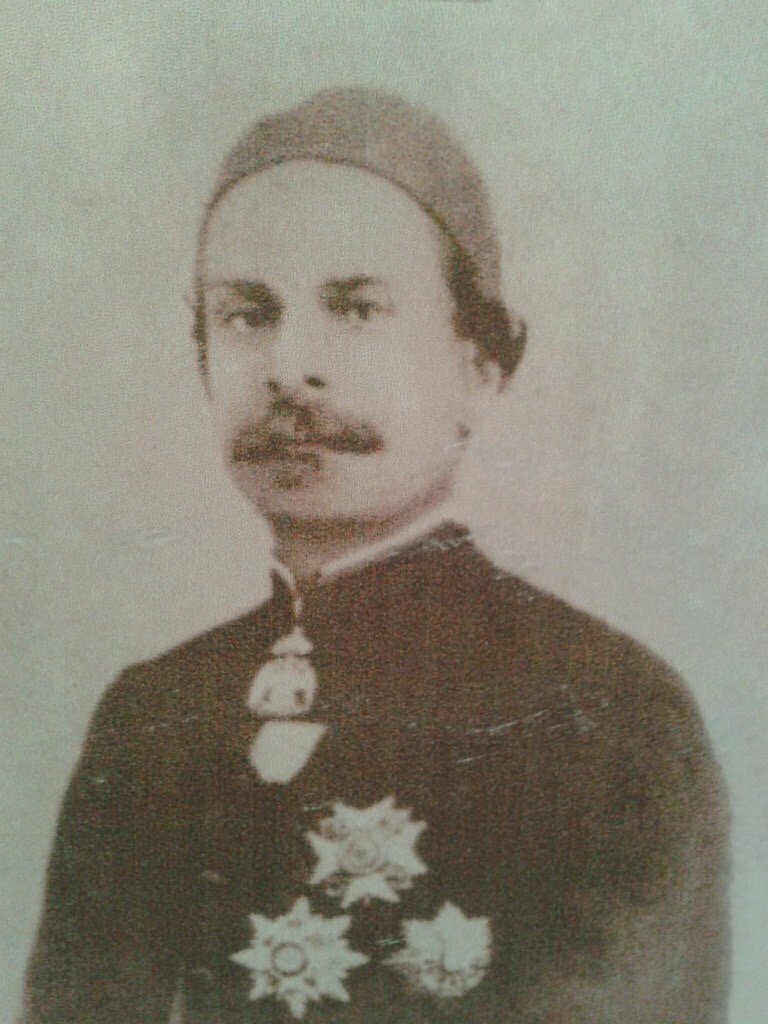
Girolamo de Rada foremost figure of the Albanian Renaissance movement in 19th century Italy.

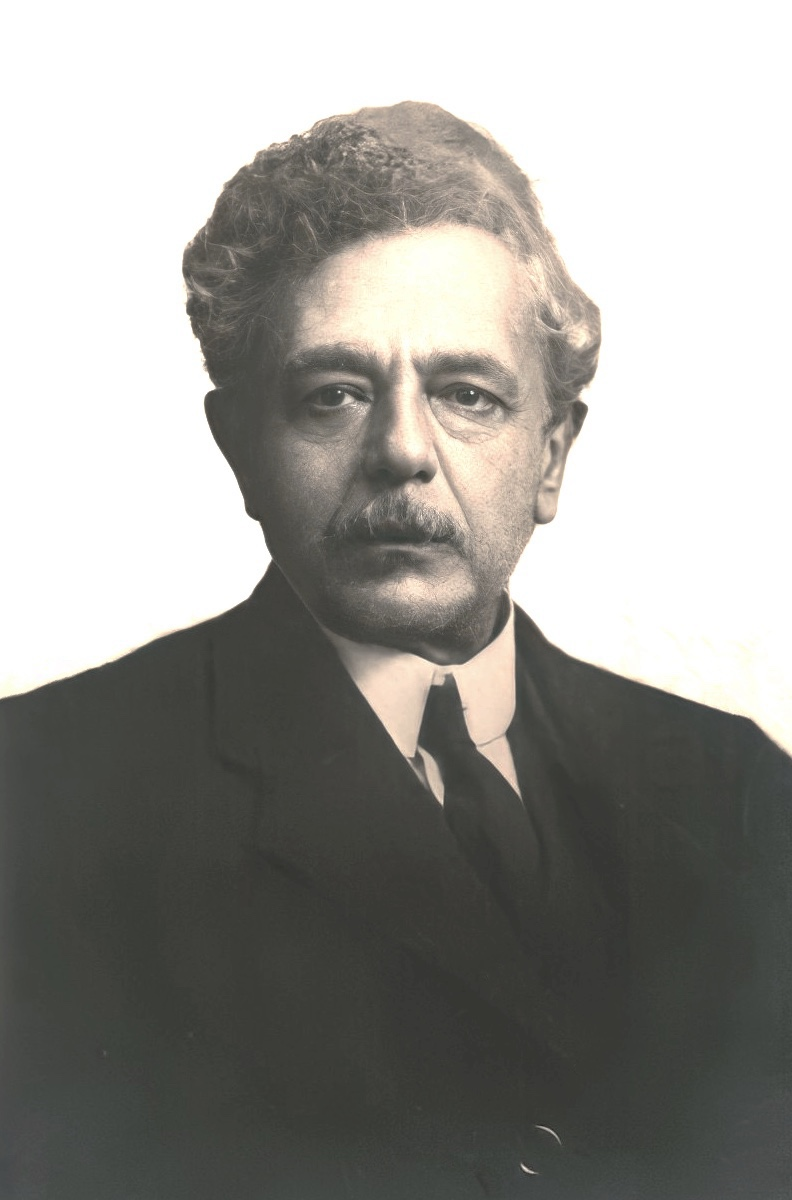
Giuseppe Schirò among the most important figures of the Albanian cultural and literary movement of the 19th century in Italy.

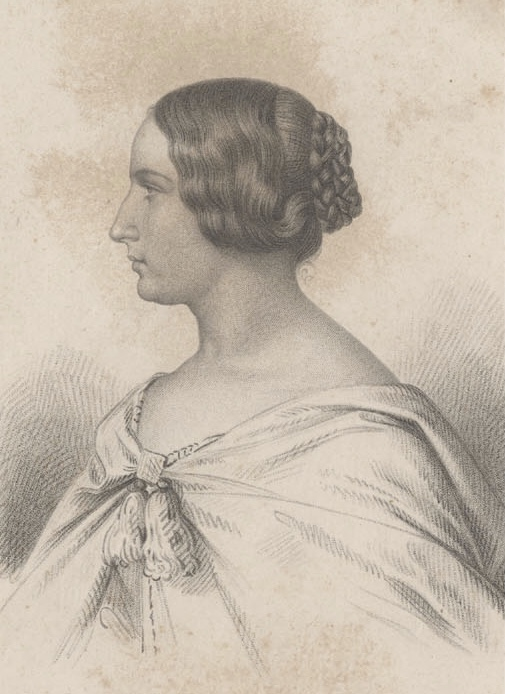
Romantic writer Dora d'Istria was a vocal advocate of Albanian rights in Western Europe.

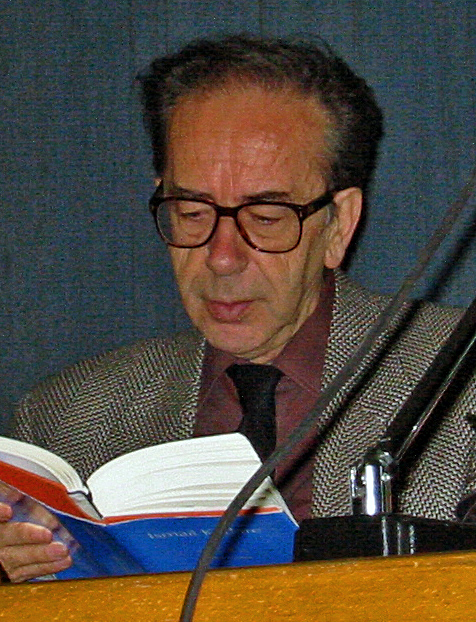
Ismail Kadare is the best-known novelist of the past century in Albanian literature.

=== Writers ===
==== A–G ====
- Dritëro Agolli (1931–2017)
- Thoma Avrami (1869–1943)
- Mimoza Ahmeti (born 1963)
- Nasiruddin al-Albani (1914–1999)
- Ylljet Aliçka (born 1951)
- Fatos Arapi (1930–2018)
- Asdreni (1872–1947)
- Frang Bardhi (1606–1643)
- Marin Barleti (1450–1513)
- Mario Bellizzi (born 1957)
- Dhimitër Beratti (1888–1970)
- Anton Berisha (born 1946)
- Gëzim Boçari (born 1949)
- Pjetër Bogdani (1630–1689)
- Besim Bokshi (1930–2014)
- Flora Brovina (born 1949)
- Pjetër Budi (1566–1622)
- Gjon Buzuku (16th century)
- Eqrem Çabej (1908–1980)
- Aleks Çaçi (1916–1989)
- Nicola Chetta (1740–1803)
- Gabriele Dara (1826–1885)
- Adem Demaçi (1936–2018)
- Musa Demi (1878–1971)
- Spiro Dine (1846–1922)
- Visar Dodani (1857–1939)
- Pal Dushmani (died 1457)
- Gjergj Fishta (1871–1940)
- Nezim Frakulla (1680–1760)
- Abdyl Frashëri (1839–1892)
- Midhat Frashëri (1880–1949)
- Naim Frashëri (1846–1900)
- Sami Frashëri (1850–1904)
- Llazar Fundo (1899–1944)
- Mirko Gashi (1939–1995)
- Gjon Gazulli (1400–1465)
- Sabri Godo (1929–2011)
- Mihal Grameno (1871–1931)
- Gregory IV of Athens (1871–1931)
- Luigj Gurakuqi (1879–1925)

==== H–L ====
- Anton Harapi (1888–1946)
- Sinan Hasani (1922–2010)
- Qemal Haxhihasani (1916–1991)
- Ukshin Hoti (1943–1999)
- Shefki Hysa (born 1957)
- Vera Isaku (1955–2021)
- Dora d'Istria (1828–1888)
- Zef Jubani (1818–1880)
- Irhan Jubica (born 1973)
- Helena Kadare (born 1943)
- Ismail Kadare (1936–2024)
- Ilir Kadia (born 1957)
- Hasan Zyko Kamberi (18th century)
- Veli Karahoda (born 1968)
- Amik Kasoruho (1932–2014)
- Teodor Keko (1958–2002)
- Jeton Kelmendi (born 1978)
- Ardian Klosi (1957–2012)
- Musine Kokalari (1917–1983)
- Vedat Kokona (1913–1998)
- Ernest Koliqi (1903–1975)
- Fatos Kongoli (born 1944)
- Faik Konitza (1875–1942)
- Mark Krasniqi (1920–2015)
- Kostandin Kristoforidhi (1826–1895)
- Mitrush Kuteli (1907–1967)
- Teodor Laço (1936–2016)
- Eulogios Kourilas Lauriotis (1880–1961)
- Lutfi Lepaja (born 1945)
- Luljeta Lleshanaku (born 1968)
- Petro Nini Luarasi (1864–1911)
- Skënder Luarasi (1900–1982)
- Fatos Lubonja (born 1951)

==== M–S ====
- Sejfulla Malëshova (1900–1971)
- Petro Marko (1913–1991)
- Mark Marku (singer) (born 1991)
- Gjekë Marinaj (born 1965)
- Jakup Mato (1934–2005)
- Lekë Matrënga (1567–1619)
- Pjetër Mazreku (1584–16??)
- Din Mehmeti (1932–2010)
- Vangjel Meksi (1770–1821)
- Esad Mekuli (1916–1993)
- Millosh Gjergj Nikolla (1911–1938)
- Thimi Mitko (1820–1890)
- Ndre Mjeda (1866–1937)
- Hilë Mosi (1885–1933)
- Betim Muço (1947–2015)
- Besnik Mustafaj (born 1958)
- Gjon Muzaka (born 1510)
- Papa Kristo Negovani (1875–1905)
- Ndoc Nikaj (1864–1951)
- Millosh Gjergj Nikolla (1911–1938)
- Fan S. Noli (1882–1965)
- Fadil Paçrami (1922–2008)
- Ludmilla Pajo (1947–1995)
- Dhimitër Pasko (1907–1967)
- Shefqet Pllana (1918–1994)
- Ali Podrimja (1942–2012)
- Lasgush Poradeci (1899–1987)
- Foqion Postoli (1889–1927)
- Iljaz Prokshi (1907–1967)
- Gjergj Qiriazi (1868–1912)
- Rexhep Qosja (1936–2026)
- Girolamo de Rada (1814–1903)
- Luan Rama (born 1952)
- Agim Ramadani (1964–1999)
- Giuseppe Schirò (1865–1927)
- Zef Serembe (1844–1901)
- Bashkim Shehu (born 1955)
- Filip Shiroka (1859–1935)
- Dhimitër Shuteriqi (1915–2003)
- Robert Shvarc (1932–2003)
- Drago Siliqi (1930–1963)
- Llazar Siliqi (1924–2001)
- Nokë Sinishtaj (born 1944)
- Ramadan Sokoli (1920–2008)
- Pandeli Sotiri (1842–1892)
- Xhevahir Spahiu (born 1945)
- Haki Stërmilli (1895–1953)

==== T–Z ====
- Hasan Tahsini (1811–1881)
- Fatos Tarifa (born 1954)
- Skender Temali (1946–2021)
- Çerçiz Topulli (1880–1915)
- Kasëm Trebeshina (1926–2017)
- Misto Treska (1914–1993)
- Konstantinos Tzechanis (1740–1800)
- Vorea Ujko (1918–1989)
- Hajro Ulqinaku (born 1938)
- Giulio Variboba (1725–1788)
- Vaso Pasha (1825–1892)
- Jan Evstrat Vithkuqari (1755–1822)
- Demir Vlonjati (1780–1845)
- Eqrem Vlora (1885–1964)
- Jani Vreto (1822–1900)
- Bilal Xhaferri (1935–1986)
- Dhimitër Xhuvani (1934–2009)
- Jakov Xoxa (1923–1979)
- Muçi Zade (18th century)
- Pjetër Zarishi (1806–1866)
- Fehim Zavalani (1859–1935)
- Petro Zheji (1929–2015)

=== Poets ===
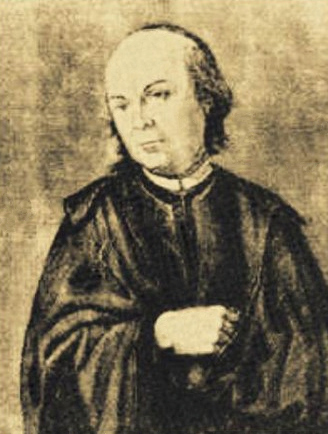
Giulio Variboba priest poet who gave an important contribution to the literature in the Albanian language.

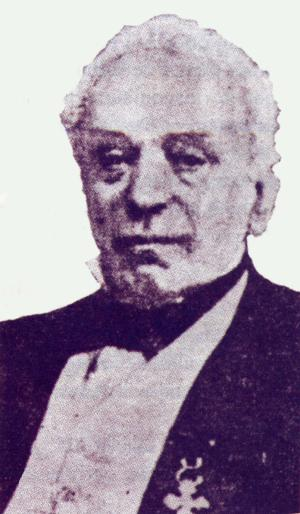
Gabriele Dara one of the early writers of the Albanian National Awakening.

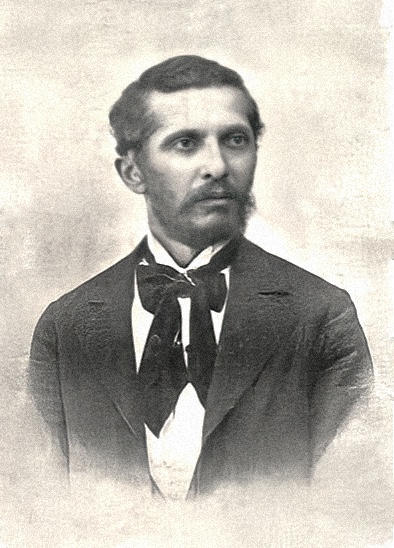
Naim Frashëri is regarded as the national poet of Albania

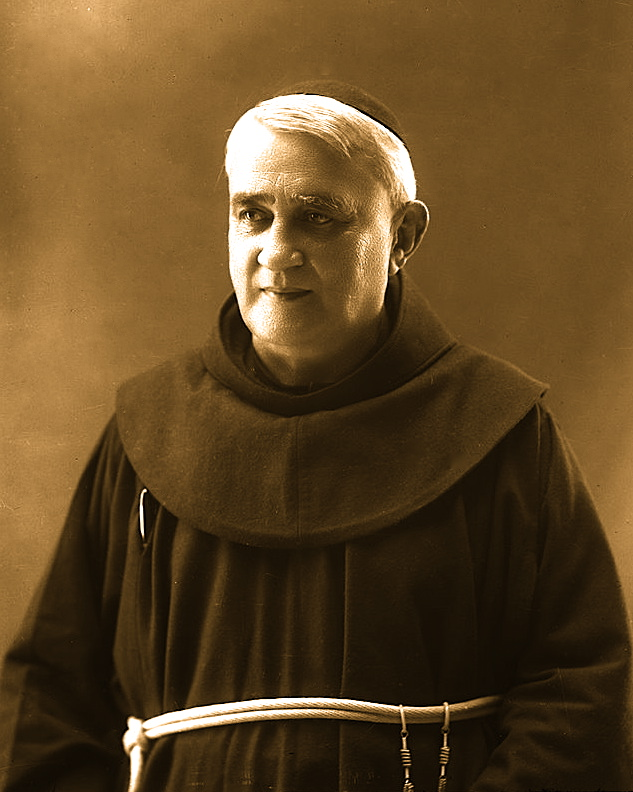
Gjergj Fishta author of the epic poem Lahuta e Malcís.

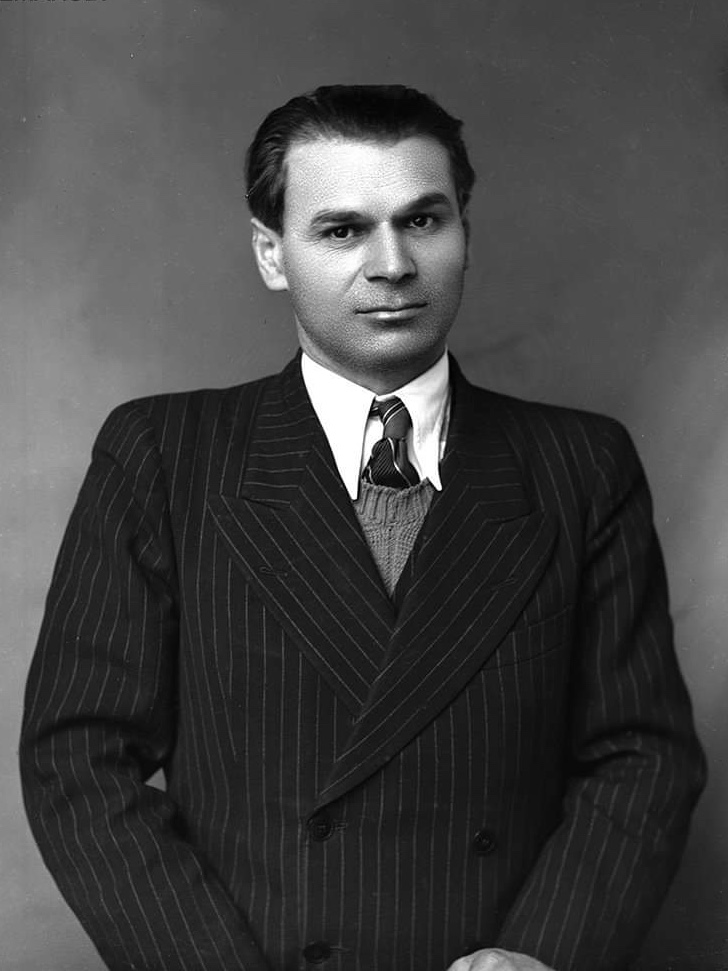
Lasgush Poradeci poet of 20th century Albania.

- Flutura Açka (born 1956)
- Thoma Avrami (1869–1943)
- Dritëro Agolli (1931–2017)
- Mimoza Ahmeti (born 1963)
- Fatos Arapi (1930–2018)
- Nasibi Tahir Babai (–1835)
- Llukë Bogdani (–1687)
- Zenel Bastari (18th Century)
- Besim Bokshi (1930–2014)
- Constantine of Berat (18th Century)
- Ferhat Cakaj Shkrimtar
- Etëhem Bey Mollaj (1783–1846)
- Flora Brovina (born 1949)
- Çajupi (1866–1930)
- Spiro Dine (1846–1922)
- Prend Doçi (1846–1917)
- Asdreni (1872–1947)
- Gjergj Fishta (1871–1940)
- Nezim Frakulla (1680–1760)
- Mid’hat Frashëri (1880–1949)
- Ndoc Gjetja (1944–2010)
- Julia Gjika (born 1949)
- Milto S. Gurra (1884–1972)
- Ervin Hatibi (born 1974)
- Ibrahim Dalliu (1878–1952)
- Irhan Jubica (born 1973)
- Kadrush Radogoshi (born 1948)
- Hasan Zyko Kamberi (18th Century)
- Karmel Kandreva (1931–1982)
- Veli Karahoda (born 1968)
- Haxhi Ymer Kashari (18th Century)
- Teodor Keko (1958–2002)
- Ernest Koliqi (1903–1975)
- Mark Krasniqi (1920–2015)
- Irma Kurti (born 1966)
- Natasha Lako (born 1948)
- Gjekë Marinaj (born 1965)
- Ndre Mjeda (1866–1937)
- Betim Muço (1947–2015)
- Faruk Myrtaj (born 1955)
- Havzi Nela (1934–1988)
- Migjeni (1911–1938)
- Fan Noli (1882–1965)
- Bernardin Palaj (1894–1947)
- Dhimitër Pasko (1907–1967)
- Arshi Pipa (1920–1997)
- Lasgush Poradeci (1899–1987)
- Girolamo de Rada (1814–1903)
- Nijazi Ramadani (born 1964)
- Giuseppe Schirò (1865–1927)
- Filip Shiroka (1859–1935)
- Llazar Siliqi (1924–2001)
- Xhevahir Spahiu (born 1945)
- Murad Toptani (1867–1918)
- Giulio Variboba (1725–1788)
- Bilal Xhaferri (1935–1986)
- Muçi Zade (18th Century)

=== Screenwriters ===
- Dhimitër Anagnosti (1936–2025)
- Kujtim Çashku (born 1950)
- Elvira Dones (born 1960)
- Fatmir Gjata (1922–1989)
- Kujtim Gjonaj (1946–2021)
- Hysen Hakani (1932–2011)
- Xhanfize Keko (1928–2007)
- Skifter Këlliçi (born 1938)
- Anastas Kondo (1937–2006)
- Saim Kokona (1934–2012)
- Viktor Gjika (1937–2009)
- Vath Koreshi (1936–2006)
- Nijazi Ramadani (born 1964)
- Llazar Siliqi (1924–2001)
- Nexhati Tafa (born 1952)
- Dhimitër Xhuvani (1934–2009)
- Gjergj Xhuvani (1963–2019)

=== Journalists ===
- Bardhyl Ajeti (1977–2005)
- Agron Bajrami (born 1964)
- Dhimitër Beratti (1886–1970)
- Berat Buzhala (born 1975)
- Ligor Buzi (1915–1994)
- Jusuf Buxhovi (born 1946)
- Anastas Byku (1830–1878)
- Visar Dodani (1857–1939)
- Diana Çuli (born 1951)
- Daut Dauti (born 1960)
- Fatmir Efica (born 1961)
- Gjergj Erebara
- Blendi Fevziu (born 1969)
- Llazar Fundo (1899–1944)
- Fatmir Gjata (1922–1989)
- Mihal Grameno (1871–1931)
- Milto S. Gurra (1884–1972)
- Baton Haxhiu (born 1968)
- Shefki Hysa (born 1957)
- Vera Isaku (1955–2021)
- Teodor Keko (1958–2002)
- Jeton Kelmendi (born 1978)
- Dashnor Kokonozi (born 1951)
- Shahin Kolonja (1865–1919)
- Pandi Laço (born 1964)
- Kristo Luarasi (1876–1934)
- Shkëlzen Maliqi (born 1947)
- Enver Maloku (1954–1999)
- Gjekë Marinaj (born 1965)
- Marin Mema (born 1981)
- Thimi Mitko (1820–1890)
- Hajdar Muneka (1954–2022)
- Faruk Myrtaj (born 1955)
- Palokë Nika (1892–1961)
- Sali Nivica (1890–1920)
- Dhimitër Pasko (1907–1967)
- Alfred Peza (born 1967)
- Bedri Pejani (1885–1946)
- Leon Qafzezi (born 1953)
- Girolamo de Rada (1814–1903)
- Nijazi Ramadani (born 1964)
- Arlind Sadiku (born 1989)
- Adem Salihaj (born 1950)
- Dardan Selimaj (born 1984)
- Armand Shkullaku
- Athanas Sina
- Avni Spahiu (born 1953)
- Andrea Stefani (born 1969)
- Iliriana Sulkuqi (born 1951)
- Skënder Temali (1946–2021)
- Nexhmie Zaimi (1917–2003)
- Mihal Zallari (1894–1976)
- Fehim Zavalani (1859–1935)
- Tajar Zavalani (1903–1966)
- Avni Zogiani (born 1970)
- Bilal Xhaferri (1935–1986)
- Arbana Xharra (born 1953)

=== Folklorists ===
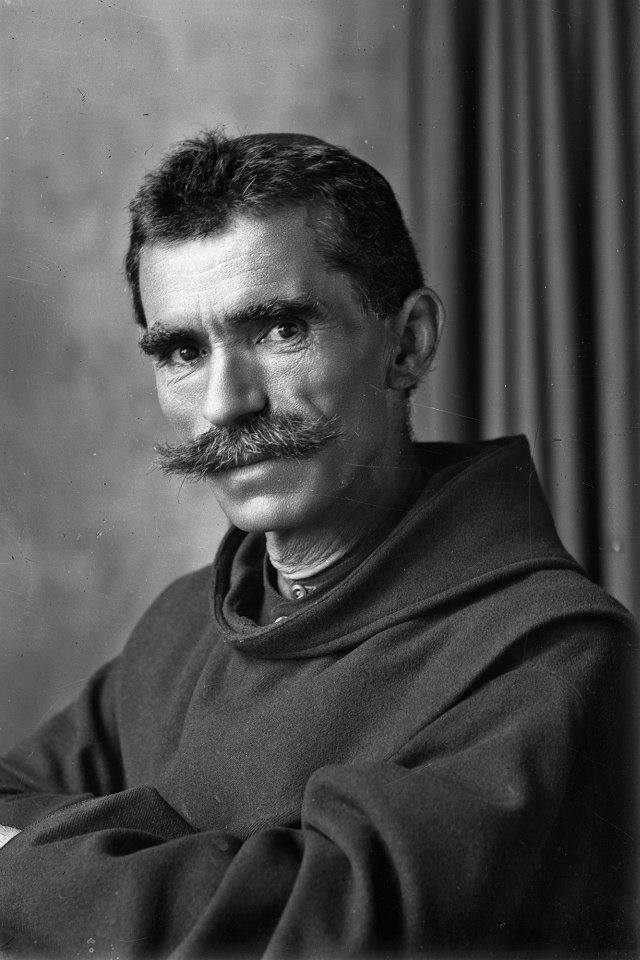
Shtjefën Gjeçovi considered the father of Albanian folklore studies.

- Mehdi Bardhi (1927–1994)
- Anton Berisha (born 1946)
- Martin Camaj (1925–1992)
- Anton Çetta (1920–1995)
- Tahir Dizdari (1900–1972)
- Visar Dodani (1857–1939)
- Nikollë Filja (1691–1769), Italian: Nicola Figlia – Arbëreshë Byzantine rite priest, and writer of the 18th century; known for his translations of biblical fragments into Arbëreshë for children; Arbëreshë folklorist
- Shtjefën Gjeçovi (1874–1929) – Catholic priest, ethnologist and folklorist; known for being the father of Albanian folklore studies
- Karl Gurakuqi (1895–1971) – Albanian linguist and folklorist
- Qemal Haxhihasani (1916–1991)
- Petro Janura (1911–1983) – a main personality of the Albanian language, literature, and folklore in Yugoslavia in the 50s through mid-80s
- Zef Jubani
- Sotir Kolea (1872–1945) – Albanian folklorist, diplomat and activist of the Albanian National Awakening
- Donat Kurti (1903–1983)
- Thimi Mitko (1820–1890) – activist of the Albanian National Awakening and folklorist
- Bernardin Palaj (1894–1947)
- Gjergj Pekmezi (1872–1938) – also known as Georg Pekmezi; Albanian linguist and folklorist; in 1916 became a member of the Literary Commission of Shkodër, which established the first standard form of the Albanian language
- Girolamo de Rada (1814–1903) – Albanian writer of Italo-Albanian literature; of Arbëreshë descent; foremost figure of the Albanian National Awakening in 19th-century Italy
- Giuseppe Schirò (1865–1927) – Arbëreshë neo-classical poet, linguist, publicist and folklorist
- Shefqet Pllana (1918–1994)
- Dhimitër Shuteriqi (1915–2003)
- Ramadan Sokoli (1920–2008)
- Tonin Çobani (born 1947)

=== Translators ===
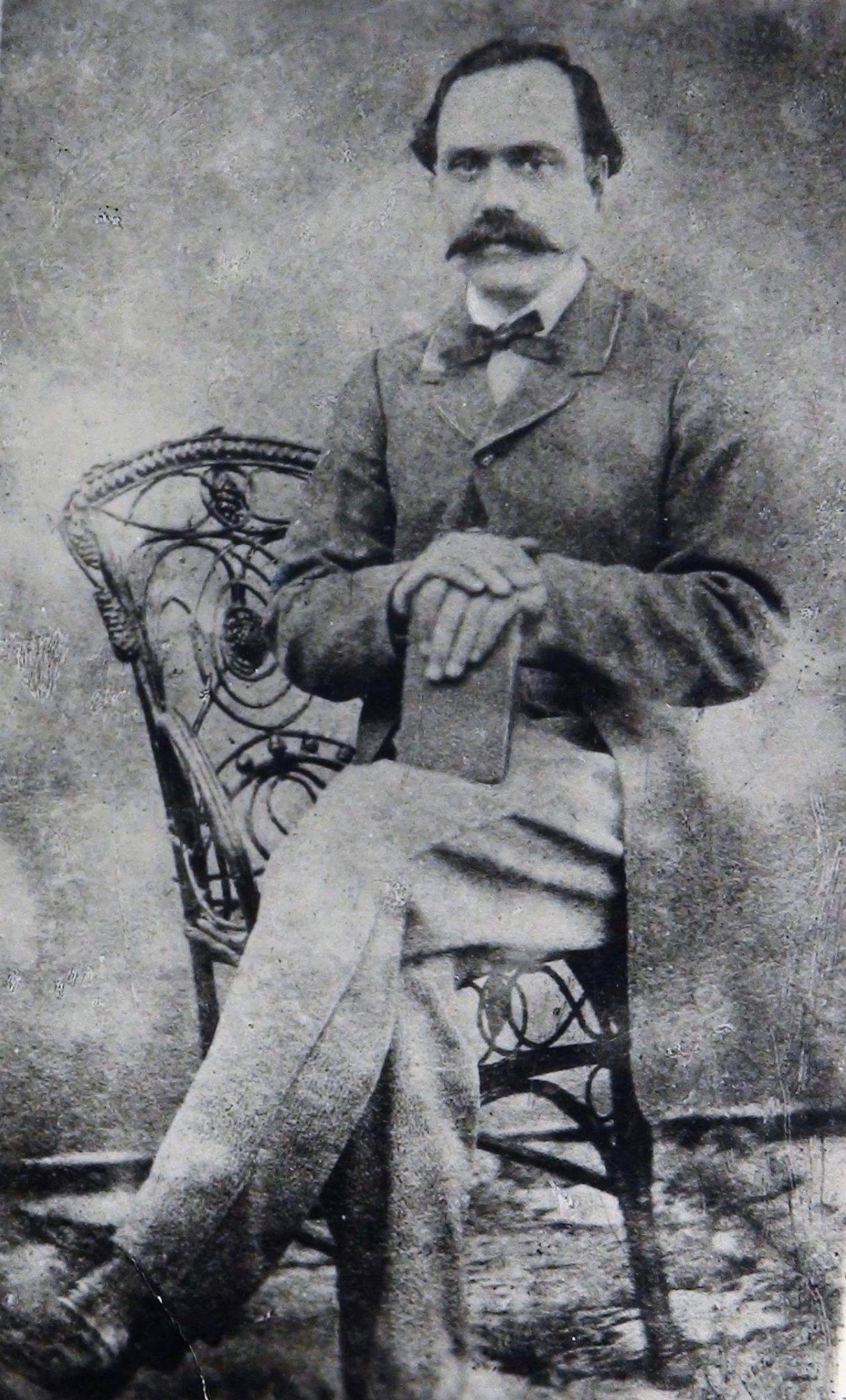
Scholar and translator Kostandin Kristoforidhi.

- Idriz Ajeti
- Fatos Arapi
- Mehdi Bardhi
- Muharrem Blakçori
- Dionis Bubani
- Gjergj Bubani
- Gjon Buzuku
- Refo Çapari
- Costa Chekrezi
- Shaban Demiraj
- Visar Dodani
- Nikollë Filja
- Gjergj Fishta
- Kristo Floqi
- Mid'hat Frashëri
- Naim Frashëri
- Lola Gjoka
- Gregory IV of Athens
- Milto Sotir Gurra
- Ibrahim Dalliu
- Halil Jaçellari
- Petro Janura
- Zef Jubani
- Ardian Klosi
- Jolanda Kodra
- Vedat Kokona
- Ernest Koliqi
- Shahin Kolonja
- Kostandin Kristoforidhi
- Çezar Kurti
- Donat Kurti
- Henrik Lacaj
- Loni Logori
- Gjekë Marinaj
- Vangjel Meksi
- Esad Mekuli
- Betim Muço
- Faruk Myrtaj
- Fan S. Noli
- Dhimitër Pasko
- Aurel Plasari
- Lasgush Poradeci
- Athanas Sina
- Skënder Luarasi
- Luan Starova
- Misto Treska
- Ardian Vehbiu
- Jan Evstrat Vithkuqari
- Eqrem Vlora
- Isuf Vrioni
- Tajar Zavalani
- Petro Zheji

== Academic sciences ==
=== Scientists ===
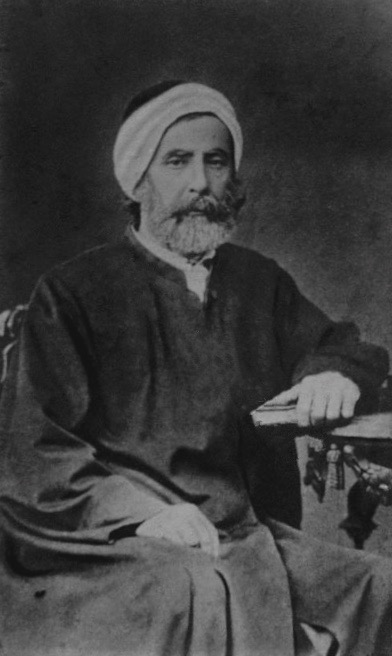
Scholar and philosopher Hasan Tahsini first rector of Istanbul University.

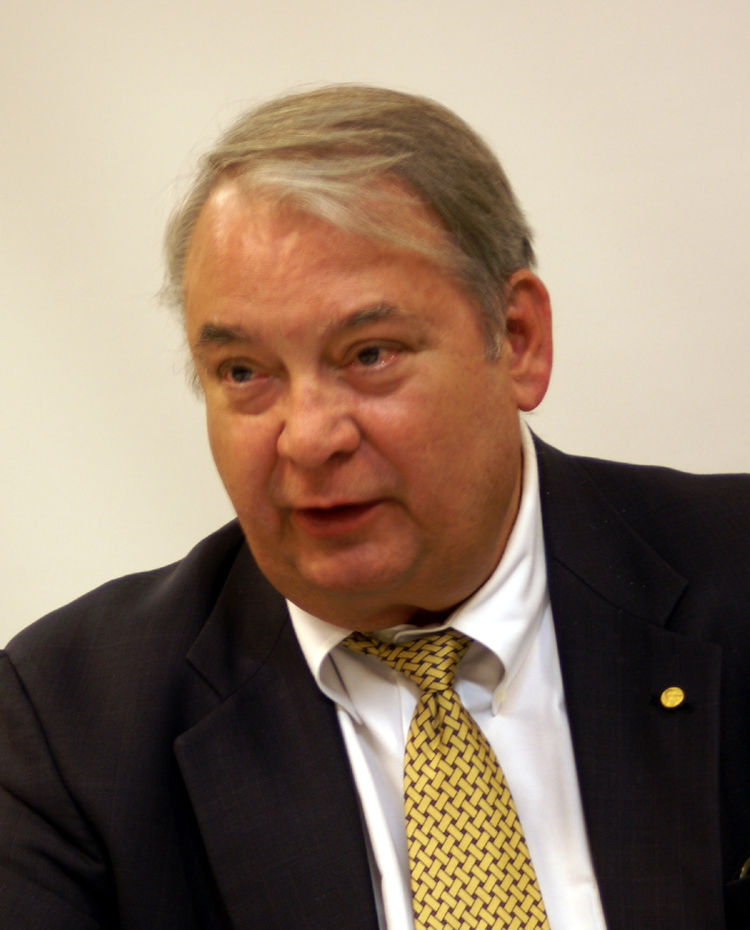
Ferid Murad physician and pharmacologist, and co-winner of the 1998 Nobel Prize in Physiology or Medicine.

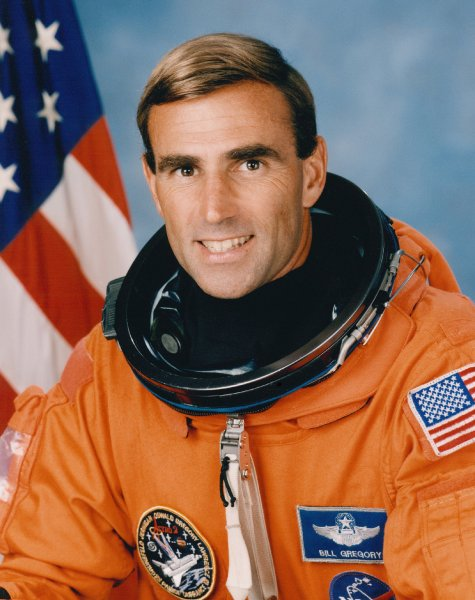
Albanian-American astronaut William G. Gregory.

- Teki Biçoku (1926–2009) – geologist; former member and president of the Academy of Sciences of Albania
- Gjon Gazulli (1400–1465) – astronomer
- Pandi Geço – geographer
- Shtjefën Gjeçovi (1874–1929) – ethnographer
- Sotir Kuneshka – physicist
- Rexhep Meidani – physicist
- Laura Mersini-Houghton – Albanian-American cosmologist and theoretical physicist; associate professor at the University of North Carolina at Chapel Hill; proponent of the multiverse hypothesis which holds that our universe is one of many
- Betim Muço – seismologist
- Ferid Murad (1936–2023) – physician and pharmacologist; co-winner of the 1998 Nobel Prize in Physiology or Medicine
- Shefqet Pllana (1918–1994) – ethnographer
- Niko Qafzezi (1914–1998) – agronomist and pedagogue
- Nijazi Ramadani (born 1964) – ethnographer
- Andrea Shundi (1934–2024) – agronomist of the 20th and 21st century
- Xhezair Teliti – mathematician

=== Philosophers ===
- Marin Beçikemi (1468–1526) – 15th- and 16th-century humanist, orator, and chronist
- Sami Frashëri (1850–1904)
- Gani Bobi (1943–1995) – philosopher and sociologist from Kosovo
- Ibrahim Gashi (born 1963) – Kosovar Albanian academic and philosopher
- Ukshin Hoti (1943–1999) – Kosovo Albanian philosopher and activist
- Zef Jubani (1818–1880)
- Muhamedin Kullashi
- Shkëlzen Maliqi (born 1947) – Kosovo Albanian philosopher, art critic, political analyst and intellectual; was involved in politics in the 1990s
- Arshi Pipa (1920–1997) – Albanian-American philosopher, writer, poet and literary critic
- Petro Zheji (1929–2015) – linguist, translator, philosopher, and author from Gjirokastër; lived and worked in Tirana, Albania

=== Social scientists ===
- Gëzim Alpion – academic, political analyst, writer, playwright, and civil society activist
- Albert Doja (born 1957) – social anthropologist, member of the National Albanian Academy of Sciences and University Professor of Anthropology at the University of Lille, France.

=== Historians ===
- Frang Bardhi, Frang Bardhi (Latin: Franciscus Blancus, Italian: Francesco Bianchi, 1606–1643) – bishop and author of the early eras of Albanian literature
- Marin Barleti (1450–1512/13) – historian and Catholic priest from Shkodra; considered the first Albanian historian because of his 1504 eyewitness account of the 1478 siege of Shkodra; better known for his second work, a biography on Skanderbeg, translated into many languages in the 16th to the 20th centuries
- Aleks Buda (1910–1993) – Albanian historian
- Jorgo Bulo (1939–2015) – philologist, historian, and literary critic; member of the Albanian Academy of Arts and Sciences
- Eqrem Çabej (1908–1980) – historical linguist and scholar who, through the publication of numerous studies gained a reputation as a key expert in research on Albanian language, literature, ethnology, and linguistics
- Kostandin Çekrezi (1892–1959)
- Midhat Frashëri (1880–1949)
- Naim Frashëri (1846–1900)
- Demetrio Franco (1443–1525) – scholar, soldier and Catholic priest; known for Comentario de le cose de' Turchi, et del S. Georgio Scanderbeg, principe d' Epyro, a biography of the national hero of Albania Skanderbeg
- Ibrahim Gashi
- Marka Gjoni
- Qemal Haxhihasani (1916–1991)
- Muzafer Korkuti (born 1936)
- Rexhep Krasniqi (1906–1999)
- Gjon Markagjoni (1888–1966)
- Beqir Meta
- Ndoc Nikaj (1864–1951) – priest, writer, and historian
- Fan Noli (1882–1965) – writer, scholar, diplomat, politician, historian, orator, and founder of the Albanian Orthodox Church; as prime minister and regent of Albania in 1924 during the June Revolution
- Aurel Plasari (born 1956)
- Ilo Mitkë Qafëzezi (1889–1964)
- Skënder Rizaj (1930–2021)
- Dhimitër Shuteriqi (1915–2003)
- Stavro Skëndi (1905–1989)
- Mehmet Tahsini (1864–?)
- Pashko Vasa (born 1825–1892), also known as Vaso Pasha, Wasa Pasha or Vaso Pashë Shkodrani – writer, poet and publicist of the Albanian National Awakening, and Governor of Lebanon from 1882 until his death
- Marenglen Verli (born 1951)
- Eqrem Vlora (1885–1964)
- Mihal Zallari (1896–1976)
- Tajar Zavalani (1903–1966)

=== Economists ===
- Kostandin Boshnjaku (1888–1953) – banker, politician, one of the earliest Albanian communists
- Shkëlqim Cani (born 1956) – Governor of the Bank of Albania, 1997–2004
- Sokrat Dodbiba (1899–1956) – economist and politician who served as Minister of Finance of Albania, 1943–44
- Ardian Fullani (born 1955)
- Ilir Hoti (1957–2016) – economist and banker
- Arben Malaj (born 1961)
- Qirjako Mihali (1929–2009)
- Filip Noga (1867/1868–1917) – politician; Minister of Finance of the country for four months in 1914; also known as Philippe Nogga
- Gramoz Pashko (1955–2006) – economist and politician
- Ferit Vokopola (1887–1969)
- Vrioni family – one of the great aristocratic and biggest landowner families of Albania

=== Publishers ===
- Dionis Bubani
- Gjergj Bubani
- Anastas Byku
- Kostandin Çekrezi
- Xhovalin Delia
- Vehbi Dibra
- Milo Duçi
- Arlinda Dudaj (Hovi)
- Midhat Frashëri
- Milto Sotir Gurra
- Baton Haxhiu
- Ibrahim Dalliu
- Irhan Jubica
- Ernest Koliqi
- Shahin Kolonja
- Rexhep Krasniqi
- Kyrias family
- Anselmo Lorecchio
- Kristo Luarasi
- Fatos Lubonja
- Halil Mëniku
- Thimi Mitko
- Ndoc Nikaj
- Sotir Peçi
- Marigo Posio
- Leon Qafzezi
- Gjergj Qiriazi
- Girolamo de Rada
- Drago Siliqi
- Risto Siliqi
- Flaka Surroi
- Veton Surroi
- Gëzim Tafa
- Fatmir Toçi
- Jani Vruho
- Bilal Xhaferri
- Fehim Zavalani
- Tajar Zavalani

=== Scholars and linguists ===
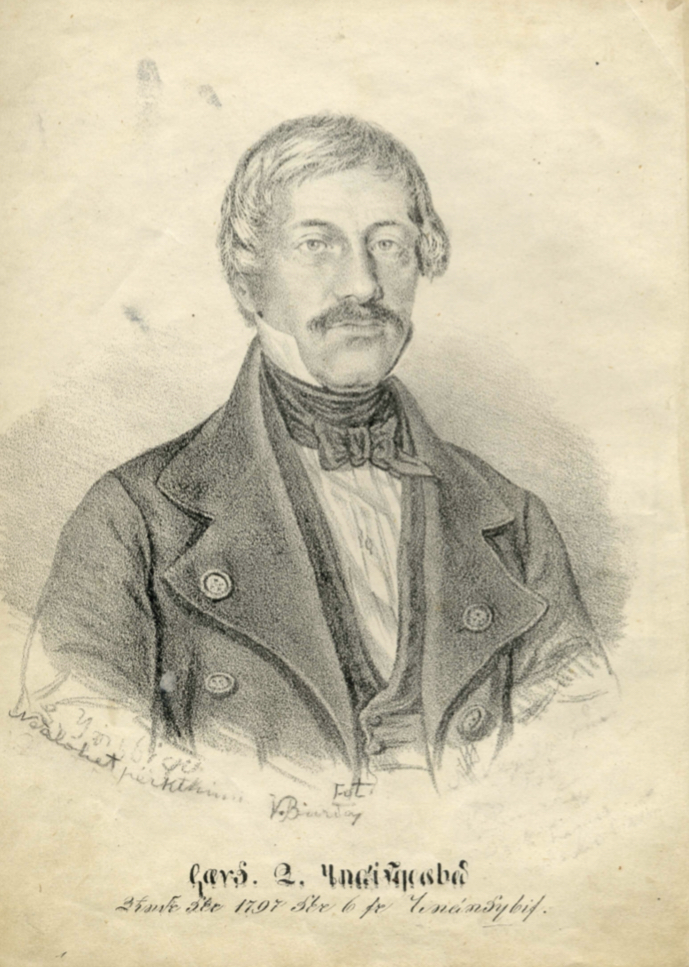
scholar of the early Albanian National Awakening period, Naum Veqilharxhi, wrote the first textbook in the Albanian language, created a unique alphabet known as the Vithkuqi script.

- Androkli Kostallari
- Androkli Kostallari
- Eqrem Çabej
- Fatmir Agalliu
- Gjergj Pekmezi
- Henrik Lacaj
- Jan Evstrat Vithkuqari
- Karl Gurakuqi
- Mahir Domi
- Martin Camaj
- Mati Logoreci
- Mirela Kumbaro
- Namik Resuli
- Namik Resuli
- Naum Veqilharxhi
- Ndoc Nikaj
- Parashqevi Qiriazi
- Petro Zheji
- Sami Frashëri
- Selman Riza
- Sevasti Qiriazi
- Shaban Demiraj
- Tahir Dizdari

== Rulers ==
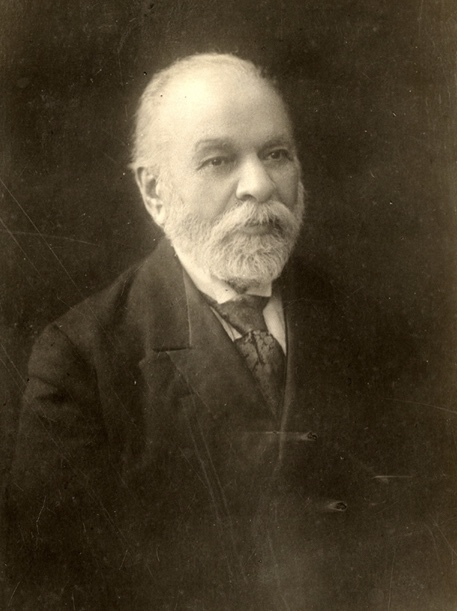
Ismail Kemal founder of modern-day Albania and country's first prime minister

- Skanderbeg (1405–1468) – 15th-century Albanian lord; "Hero of Christianism"; initiated and organized the League of Lezhë, which proclaimed him Chief of the League of the Albanian people
- Karl Thopia (Albanian: Karl Topia; 1331 – January 1388) was an Albanian feudal prince and warlord who ruled Albanian domains from 1358 until the first Ottoman conquest of Albania in 1388. He claimed the titles Prince of Albania, Lord of Krujë and Duke of Durrës
- Andrea II Muzaka (c. 1318-1372) was an Albanian nobleman of the Muzaka family and the ruler of the Principality of Muzaka in the 14th century. He inherited the principality from his father, Teodor I Muzaka, who died around 1331. Andrea II is known for having expanded the Principality of Muzaka to its greatest extent, from the southern Adriatic coastline of Albania in the west to Kastoria in the east by the time of his death in 1372. He claimed the titles Despot of the Kingdom of Albania, Marshal of Albania and Despot of Epirus.
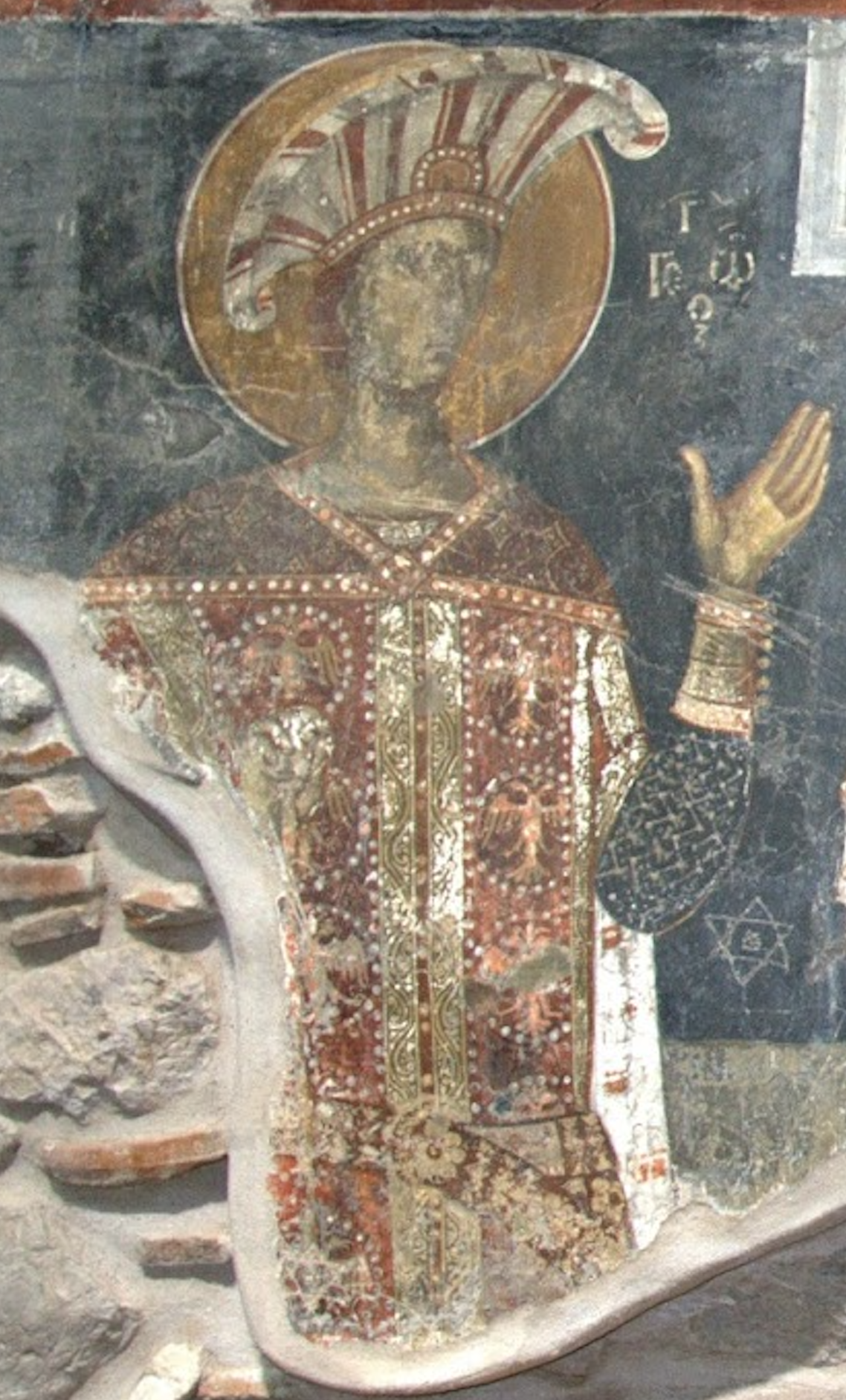
  Depiction of Andrea II Muzaka in the Church of St. Athanasius of Mouzaki in Kastoria
- Demetrio Progoni (Albanian: Dhimitër Progoni) was an Albanian leader who ruled as Prince of the Albanians from 1208 to 1216 the Principality of Arbanon, the first Albanian state. He was the successor and brother of Gjin Progoni and their father, Progon of Kruja.
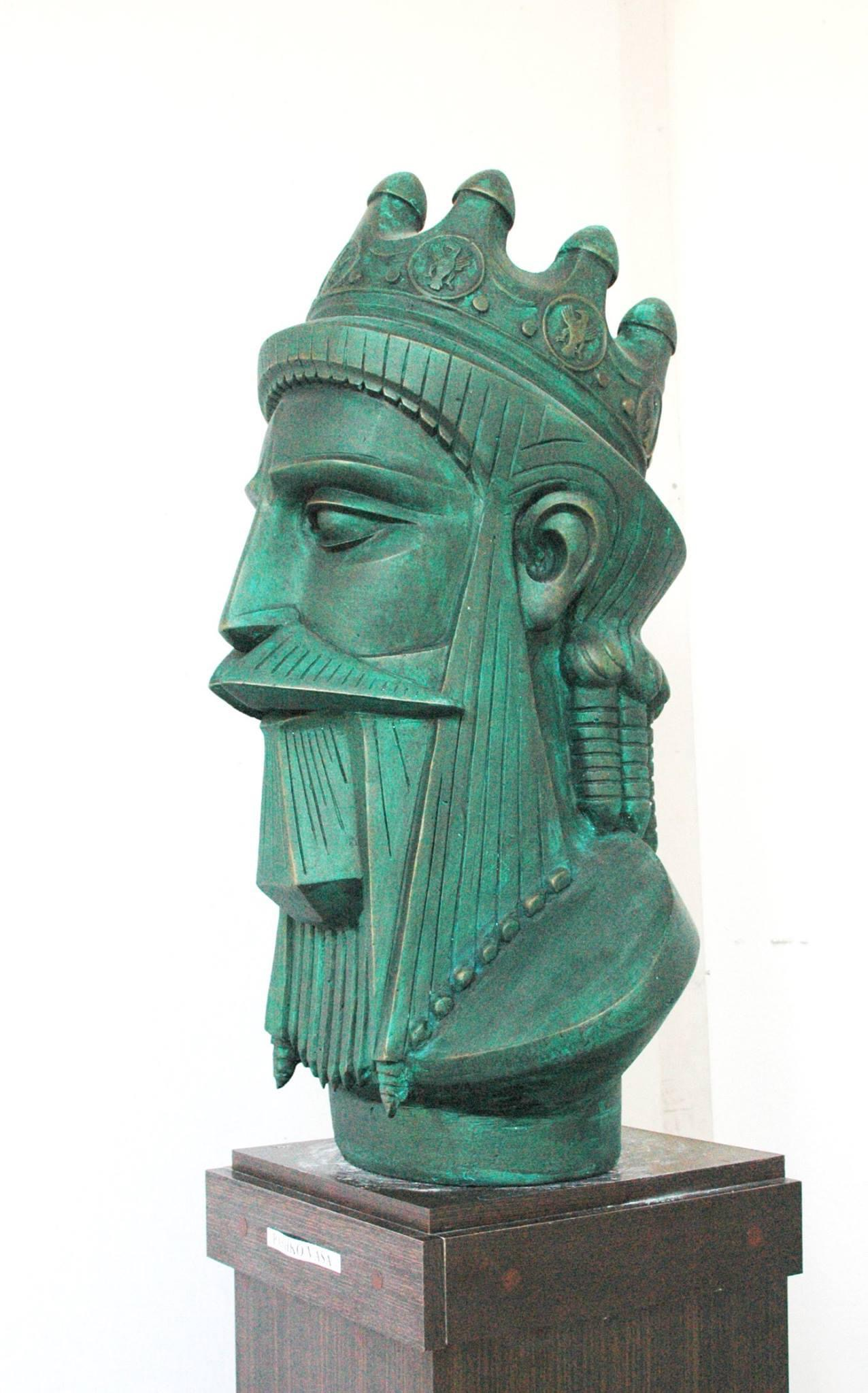
  Bust of Demetrio Progoni
  Gjin Progoni (Latin: Ginius) was an archon (or lord) of Kruja, located in present-day Albania, from c. 1198 until his death in 1208. He succeeded his father, Progon of Kruja, becoming the second ruler of the Principality of Arbanon. During his reign, he controlled the areas around Elbasan and the fortress of Krujë. He also maintained good ties with the Despotate of Epirus due to the Venetian threat in northern Epirus. Gjin was succeeded by his younger brother Dhimitër Progoni.
- Progon was the first Albanian ruler known by name, an archon of the Kruja Fortress (modern Krujë) and its surroundings, known as the Principality of Arbanon. He ruled between 1190 and 1198. Progon was succeeded by his two sons, Gjin, and Dimitri.
- Gregorios Kamonas (fl. c. 1215 – ?) was the Greek-Albanian Lord or Prince of Krujë (Arbanon) in c. 1215. Demetrios Chomatenos (1216–1236) mentioned him as having the title of sebastos, given to him by the emperor Alexios III Angelos after 1205, during his stay in the Despotate of Epirus at the court of his nephew Michael I Komnenos Doukas. He first married the daughter of Gjin Progoni, then married Serbian princess Komnena Nemanjić, the daughter of King Stefan Nemanjić and widow of Dimitri Progoni, thus inheriting the rule of Arbanon. He strengthened ties with Serbia and secured Arbanon through an Orthodox alliance. He had a daughter together with Komnena, who married Golem of Kruja the later lord of Kruje.
- Golem of Kruja was an Albanian nobleman who ruled the Principality of Arbanon, in its phase of semi-independency. He was the last ruler of Arbanon before its final annexation in the reemerging Byzantine Empire. His holdings included Krujë and probably Ohrid.
- Leke III Dukagjini (1410-1481) was a 15th-century member of the Albanian nobility, from the Dukagjini family. A contemporary of Skanderbeg, Dukagjini is known for the Kanuni i Lekë Dukagjinit, a code of law instituted among the tribes of northern Albania. Dukagjini is believed to have been born in Lipjan, Kosovo.
- Zog (born Ahmed Muhtar Zogolli; 8 October 1895 – 9 April 1961) was the leader of Albania from 1922 to 1939. At age 27, he first served as Albania's youngest ever Prime Minister (1922–1924), then as president (1925–1928), and finally as king (1928–1939).

== Politicians and diplomats ==
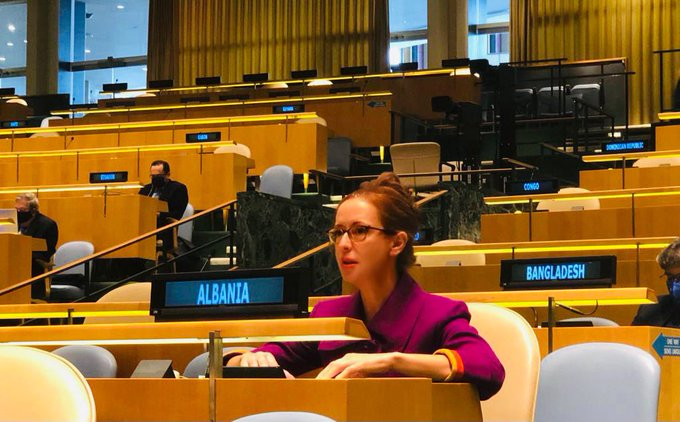
Ambassador Besiana Kadare in the UN General Assembly hall

- Ramiz Alia (1925-2011)
- Taulant Balla (born 1977)
- Sali Berisha (born 1944)
- Elona Gjebrea (born 1968)
- Enver Hoxha (1908-1985)
- Besiana Kadare (born 1973)
- Ravesa Lleshi (born 1976)
- Ilir Meta (born 1969)
- Fatos Nano (1952–2025)
- Agim Nesho (born 1956)
- Ismail Kemal (1844-1919)
- Edi Rama (born 1964)
- Ibrahim Rugova (1944-2006)
- Dashnor Shehi, 20th-century
- Mehmet Shehu (1913-1981)
- Hashim Thaçi (born 1968)
- Esad Toptani (died 1920)
- Ahmet Zogu (1895-1961)

== Visual arts ==
=== Multimedia artists ===
- Anri Sala (born 1974) – contemporary artist
- Armando Lulaj (born 1980) - contemporary artist
- Burim Myftiu (born 1961) – contemporary photographer
- Ilia Xhokaxhi (1948–2007) – scenographer
- Pleurad Xhafa (born 1984) - contemporary artist
- Saimir Strati (born 1966) – multi-media artist, achieved six Guinness World Records

=== Architects ===
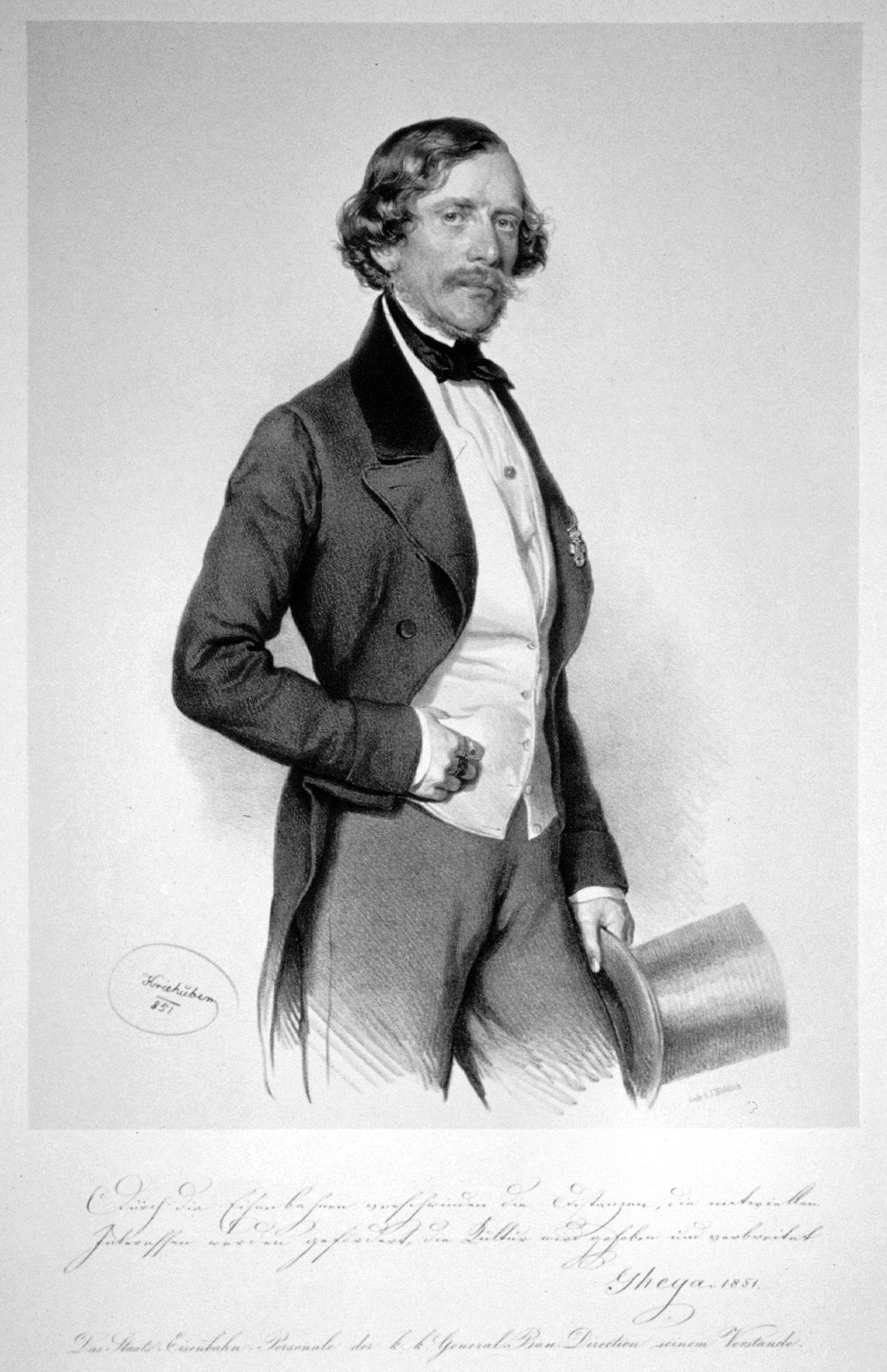
Carl Ritter von Ghega Albanian-Austrian engineer and architect who designed the Semmering railway, the world's first mountain railway.

- Andrea Alessi (1425–1505) – architect, painter and sculptor
- Architect Kasemi (1570–1659) – master of Ottoman classical architecture
- Carl Ritter von Ghega (1802–1860) – engineer and designer of railways
- Enver Faja (1992–1996) – architect and diplomat
- Petro Korçari (c. 1770–1812), Albanian architect and master builder, chief architect of Ali Pasha of Ioannina; designed Gjirokastër Castle, Porto Palermo Castle and the Gjirokastër Aqueduct
- Qemal Butka (1907–1997) – architect, painter, politician and postage stamps engraver
- Sedefkar Mehmed Agha (1540–1617) – chief architect of the Sultan Ahmed Mosque.
- Valentina Pistoli (1928–1993) – architect

=== Painters ===
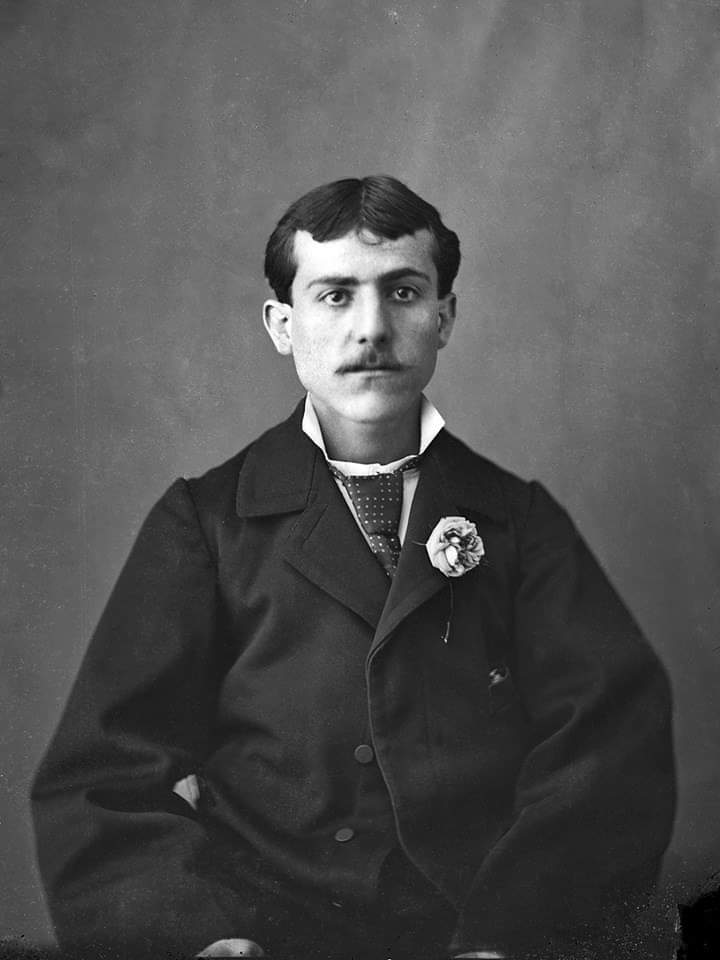
Portrait of a young Kolë Idromeno.

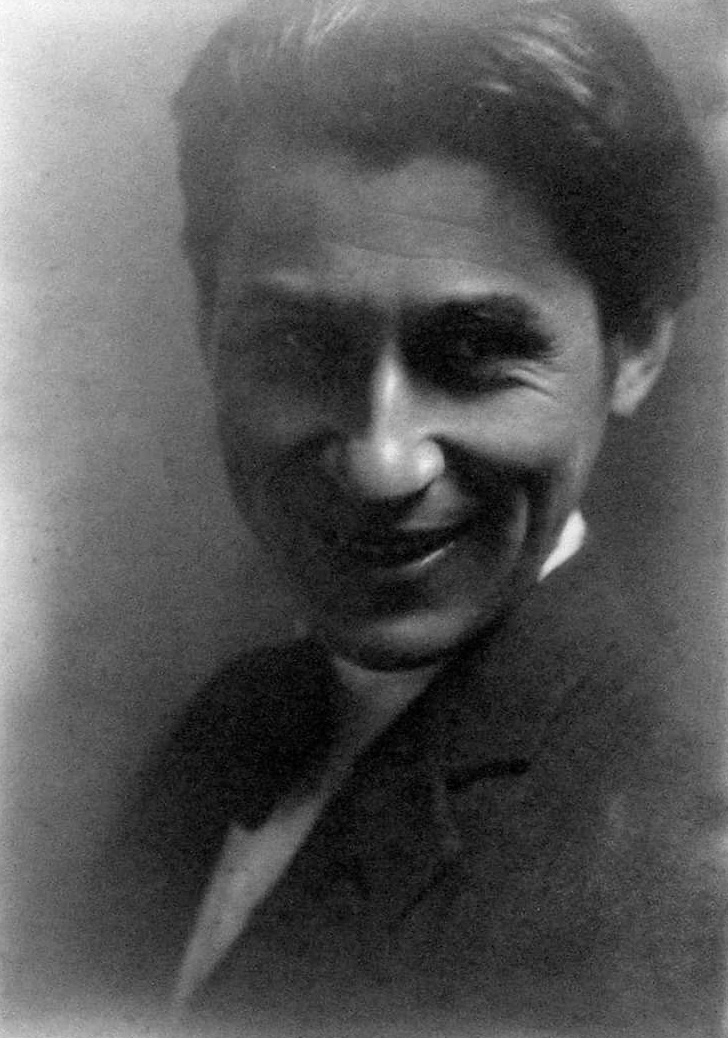
Impressionist painter Vangjush Mio.

- Abdullah Gërguri (1931–1994) – artist in restoration and conservation of icons and frescoes
- Abdurrahim Buza (1905–1986) – painter
- Agim Zajmi (1936–2013) – painter
- Andrea Kushi (1884–1959) – painter
- Arthur Tashko (1901–1994) – modern painter, lawyer and musician
- Chatin Sarachi (1899–1974) – painter and politician
- David Selenica (17th century) – painter of the late 17th and the early 18th century
- Eltjon Valle (born 1984) – painter
- Esat Valla (born 1944) – painter
- Eshref Qahili (born 1960) – painter, contemporary and conceptual visual artist
- Fatmir Haxhiu (1927–2001) – painter
- Gazmend Leka (born 1953) – painter, artistic director and scholar
- George Pali (born 1957) – painter, contemporary visual artist
- Helidon Gjergji – contemporary artist
- Ibrahim Kodra (1918–2006) – painter and writer
- Kolë Idromeno (1860–1939) – painter, sculptor, photographer, architect and engineer
- Kostandin Shpataraku (1736–1767) – Orthodox icon and fresco painter of the Post-Byzantine period in the eighteenth century.
- Marco Basaiti (c. 1470–1530) – Renaissance painter
- Ndoc Martini (1880–1916) – painter
- Nexhmedin Zajmi (1916–1991)
- Omer Kaleshi (1932–2022) – painter
- Onufri (16th century) – Orthodox icon painter and Archpriest of Elbasan
- Sabri Berkel (1907–1993) – modernist painter
- Sadri Ahmeti (1939–2010) – painter and poet
- Vangjush Mio (1891–1957) – painter
- Xhovalin Delia (born 1959) – painter, publicist and film director
- Zef Kolombi (1907–1949) – painter
- Zef Shoshi (born 1939) – painter
- Zografi Brothers (18th century) – painters of post-Byzantine icon art

=== Cartoonists and illustrators ===
- Agim Sulaj (born 1960) – illustrator and cartoonist
- Ali Dino (1889–1938) – cartoonist
- Fahri Axhanela – cartoonist
- Shyqri Nimani (1941–2023) – graphic designer

=== Sculptors ===
- Dhimitër Çani (1904–1990)
- Agim Çavdarbasha (1944–1999)
- Sadik Kaceli (1914–2000)
- Kristina Koljaka (1916–2005)
- Genc Mulliqi (born 1966)
- Vasiliev Nini (born 1954)
- Janaq Paço (1914–1991)
- Odhise Paskali (1903–1985)
- Ardian Pepa (born 1977)
- Agim Rada (1953–2023)
- Kristaq Rama (1932–1998)
- Murad Toptani (1867–1918)
- Sislej Xhafa (born 1970)
- Helidon Xhixha (born 1970)

=== Photographers ===
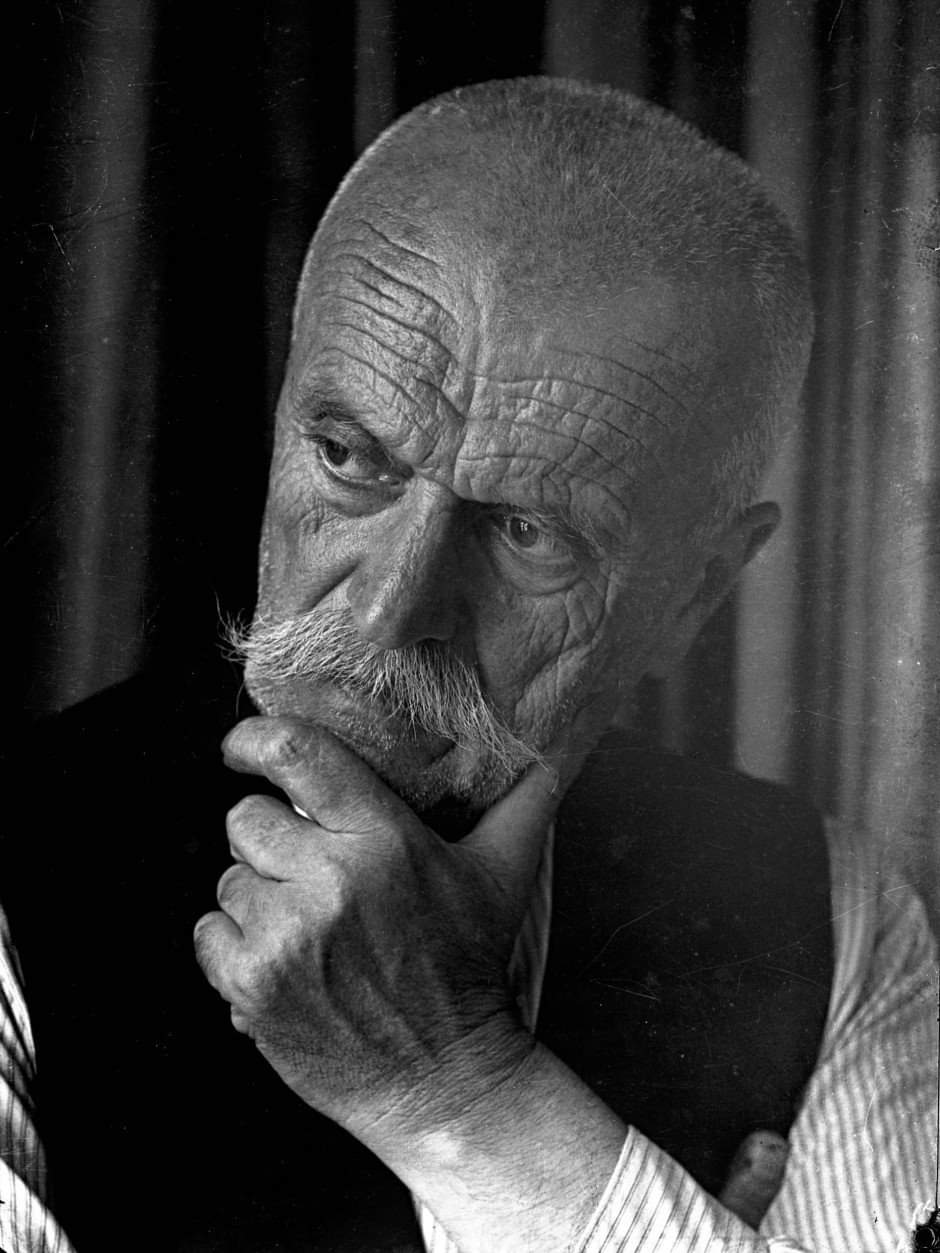
Kel Marubi photographer during the post-Independence years.

- Fadil Berisha (born 1973) – official photographer for Miss Universe, Miss USA and Rolex
- Emin Kadi – fashion photographer, journalist, art director and magazine publisher
- Gegë Marubi (1907–1984) – photographer
- Kel Marubi (1870–1940) – photographer
- Gjon Mili (1904–1984) – photographer known for his work published in Life Magazine
- Burim Myftiu (born 1961) – photographer
- Kristo Sulidhi (1858–1938) – photographer and writer
- George Tames (1919–1994) – photographer for The New York Times
- Mimoza Veliu (born 1979) – photographer

== Performing arts ==
=== Actors and actresses ===
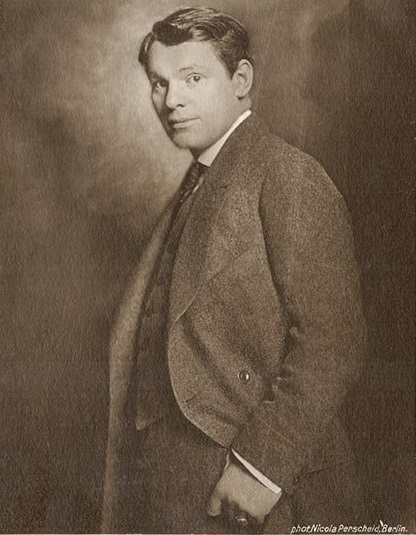
Aleksandër Moisiu actor of European stage.

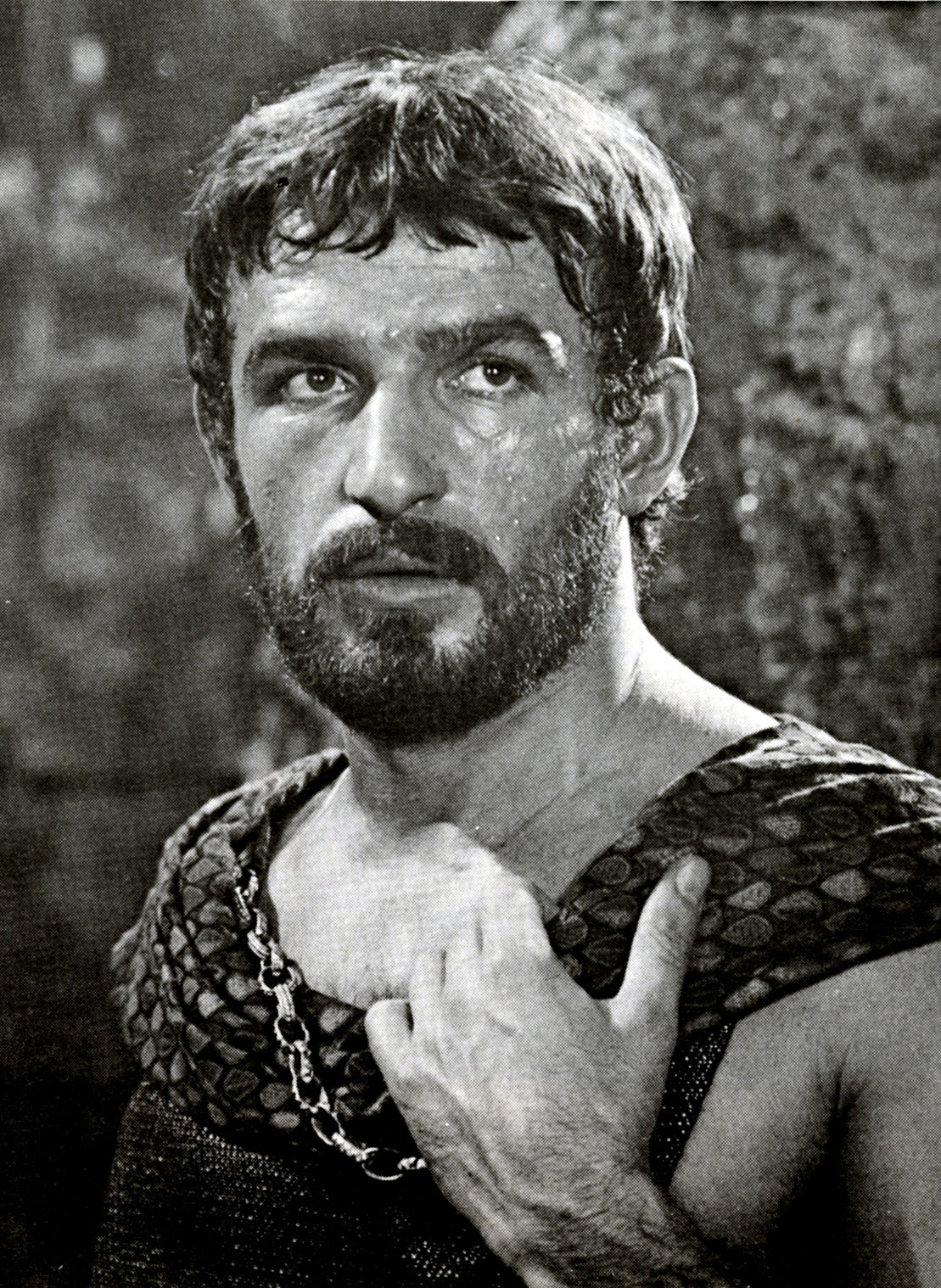
Bekim Fehmiu

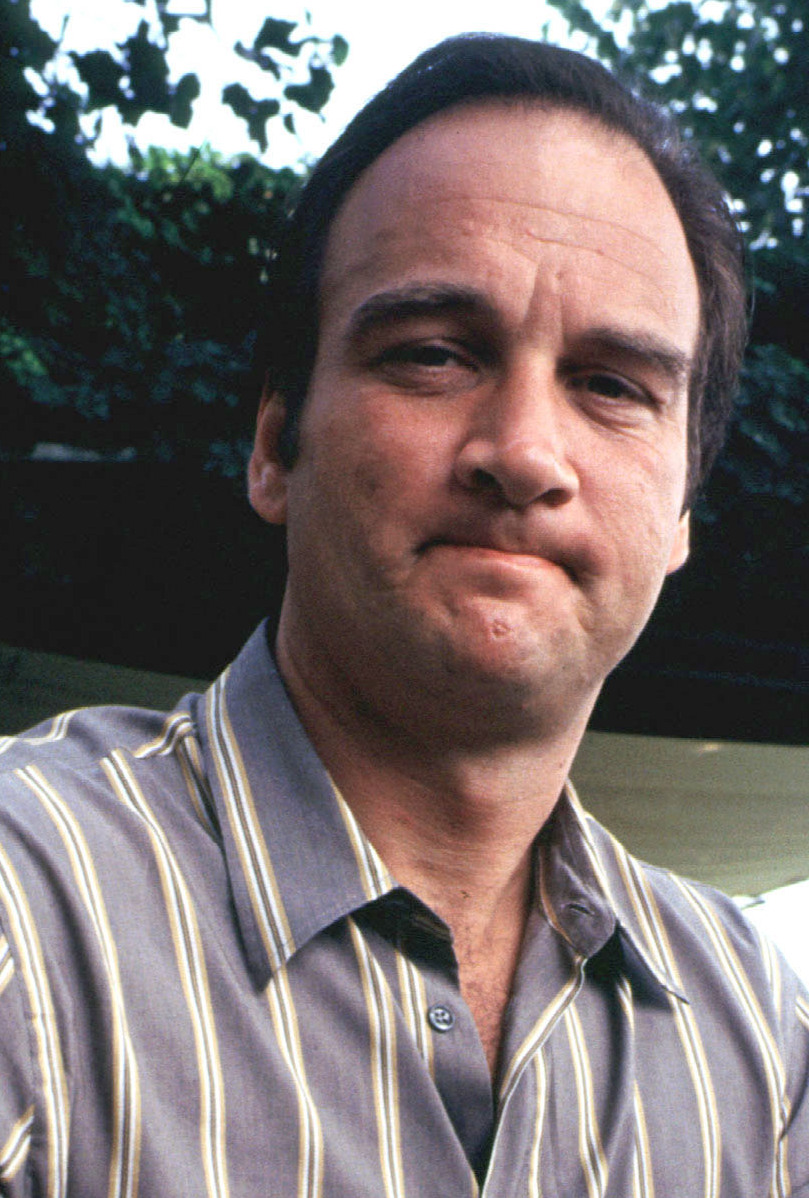
Actor Jim Belushi born in Chicago to Albanian parents.

- Melihate Ajeti (1935–2005)
- Arben Bajraktaraj (born 1973) – actor, best known for his role as the Death Eater Antonin Dolohov in the Harry Potter films
- Faruk Begolli (1944–2007)
- James Belushi (born 1954) – American actor; of Albanian descent; brother of John Belushi
- John Belushi (1949–1982) – American comedian, actor, and musician; one of the original cast members of Saturday Night Live; also known for 1978 film Animal House and as one of The Blues Brothers; of Albanian descent
- James Biberi (born 1965)
- Luli Bitri (born 1976)
- Cecilia Bolocco (born 1965) – Chilean actress, TV host and beauty queen; Miss Universo Chile 1987 and Miss Universe 1987; of Albanian descent
- Rajmonda Bulku (born 1965)
- Tracee Chimo – has Albanian ancestry
- Melpomeni Çobani (1928–2016)
- Pjetër Gjoka (1912–1982)
- Blerim Destani – actor and producer; best known for his roles in Time of the Comet and Dossier K.
- Besim Dina (born 1971)
- Arta Dobroshi (born 1980) – first Kosovar actress to walk the red carpet at the Cannes Film Festival, the Berlin International Film Festival and the Sundance Film Festival, and to be nominated for the European Film Award
- Eliza Dushku (born 1980) – of Albanian descent
- Halit Ergenç (born 1970) – Turkish actor; mother of Albanian descent
- Bekim Fehmiu (1936–2010) – Yugoslavian theater and film actor of Albanian ethnicity; first Eastern European actor to star in Hollywood during the Cold War
- Victor Gojcaj (born 1983)
- Ana Golja (born 1996) – Canadian actress and singer of Albanian descent, best known for playing Zoë Rivas in the teen drama Degrassi: Next Class and Ariana Berlin in the TV movie Full Out
- Katarina Josipi (1923–1969)
- Agim Kaba (born 1980) – American actor, artist and filmmaker of Albanian descent; best known for his role of Aaron Snyder on As the World Turns
- Mirush Kabashi (1948–2023)
- Florina Kaja (born 1982)
- Flonja Kodheli
- Tinka Kurti (born 1932)
- Marie Logoreci (1920–1988)
- Jon Lolis
- Ndrek Luca (1927–1995)
- Masiela Lusha (born 1985) – Albanian-American actress, author, producer and humanitarian; played Carmen Consuela Lopez on the globally syndicated ABC sitcom George Lopez
- Pjetër Malota (born 1959) – best known for his appearances in films starring
- Violeta Manushi (1926–2007)
- Alexander Moissi (1879–1935) – stage actor
- Yllka Mujo (born 1953)
- Robert Ndrenika (born 1942)
- Antoneta Papapavli (1938–2013)
- Drita Pelingu (1926–2013)
- Enver Petrovci (1954–2025)
- Sulejman Pitarka (1924–2007)
- Sandër Prosi (1920–1985)
- Muharrem Qena (1930–2006)
- Kadri Roshi (1924–2007)
- Skënder Sallaku (1935–2014)
- Laert Vasili (born 1974)
- Liza Vorfi (1924–2011)
- Albert Vërria (1936–2015)
- Nik Xhelilaj (born 1983) – film and stage actor; has won several "Best Actor" Awards in various international film festivals
- Margarita Xhepa (born 1932)
- Can Yaman (born 1989)
- Lec Bushati (1923–1996)

=== Comedians and satirists ===
- Spiro Çomora (1918–1973)
- Besim Dina (born 1971)
- Zyrafete Gashi (1955–2013)
- Ermal Mamaqi (born 1982)

=== Film and television directors ===
- Dhimitër Anagnosti (born 1936)
- Besnik Bisha (born 1958)
- Kujtim Çashku (born 1950)
- Arian Çuliqi (born 1960)
- Kristaq Dhamo (1933–2022)
- Stan Dragoti (1932–2018)
- Shqipe N. Duka (born 1980)
- Gëzim Erebara (1929–2007)
- Kujtim Gjonaj (1946–2021)
- Hysen Hakani (1932–2011)
- Xhanfise Keko (1928–2007)
- Saim Kokona (1934–2012)
- Saimir Kumbaro (born 1945)
- Gjergj Xhuvani (born 1963)
- Ibrahim Muçaj (1944–2010)
- Kristaq Mitro (1945–2023)
- Andamion Murataj (born 1970)
- Leon Qafzezi (born 1953)
- Isa Qosja (born 1949)
- Besim Sahatçiu (born 1935)
- Shaqir Veseli (born 1957)

=== Dancers and choreographers ===
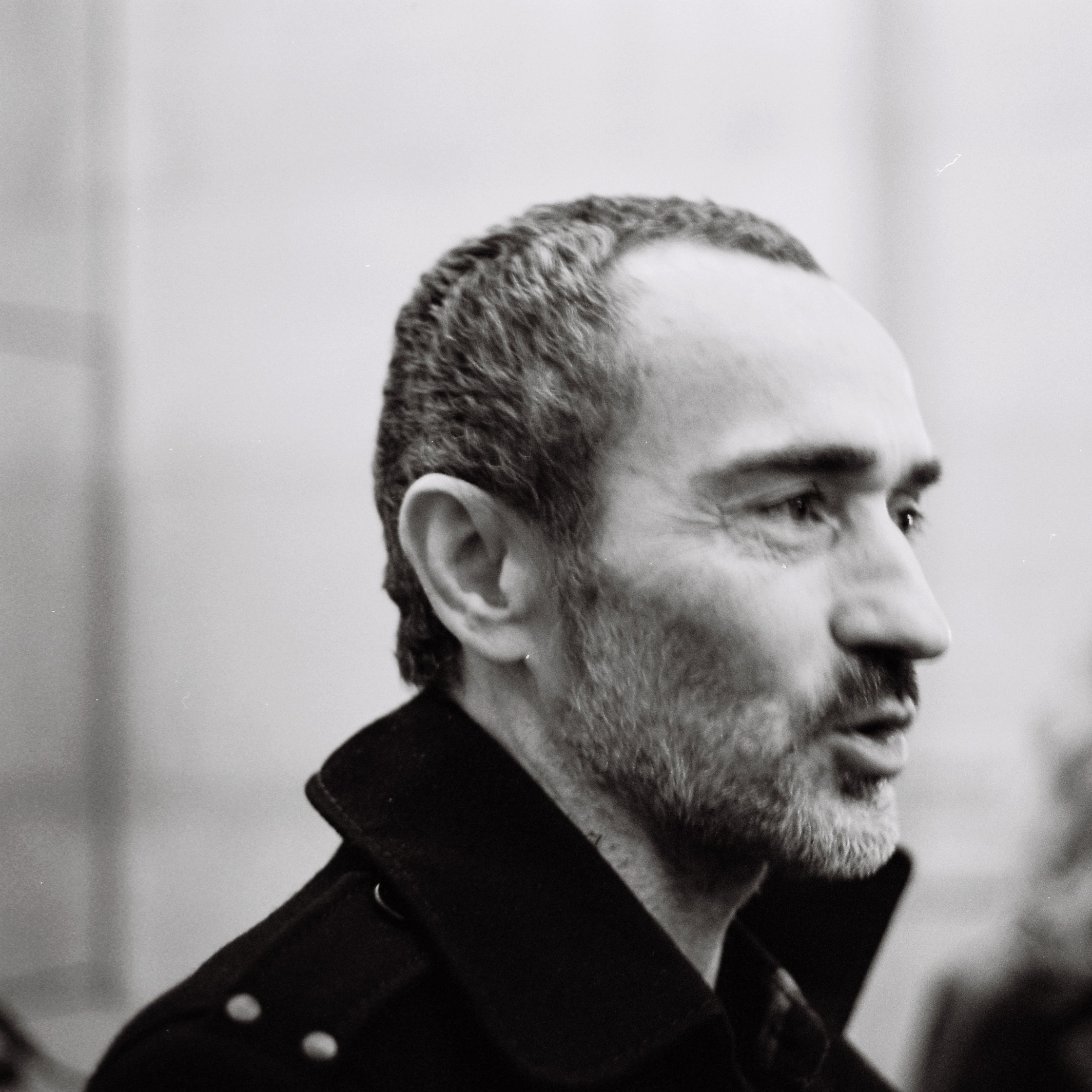
Dancer and choreographer Angelin Preljocaj is a recipient of the Prix Benois de la Danse award.

- Olta Ahmetaj – choreographer and dancer
- Esdalin Gorani – ballet dancer
- Tringa Hysa – ballet dancer
- Ilir Kerni – ballet dancer
- Spartak Hoxha – ballet dancer
- Kledi Kadiu – dancer on the popular talent show Amici di Maria De Filippi; starred in Passa a Due in 2005
- Altin Kaftira – ballet dancer
- Eno Peçi – ballet dancer
- Enkel Zhuti – ballet dancer
- Tony Dovolani (born 1973) – Albanian-American professional ballroom dancer, instructor and judge; known for his involvement in the American version of Dancing with the Stars; appeared in Shall We Dance?; spent time coaching actress Jennifer Lopez
- Angelin Preljocaj (born 1957) – choreographer of contemporary dance
- Ferbent Shehu – dancer and choreographer

=== Models and beauty pageant participants ===
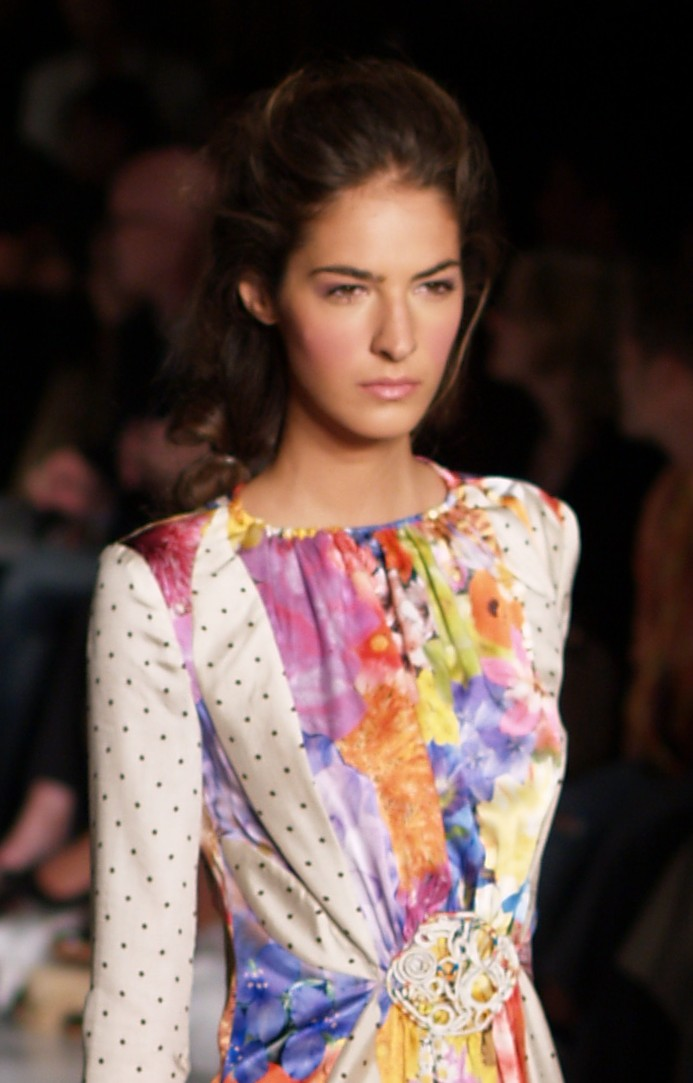
Supermodel Emina Cunmulaj

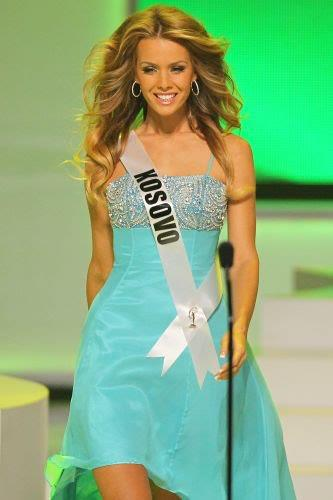
Fashion model Afërdita Dreshaj is married to former Czech ice hockey player Jakub Kindl.

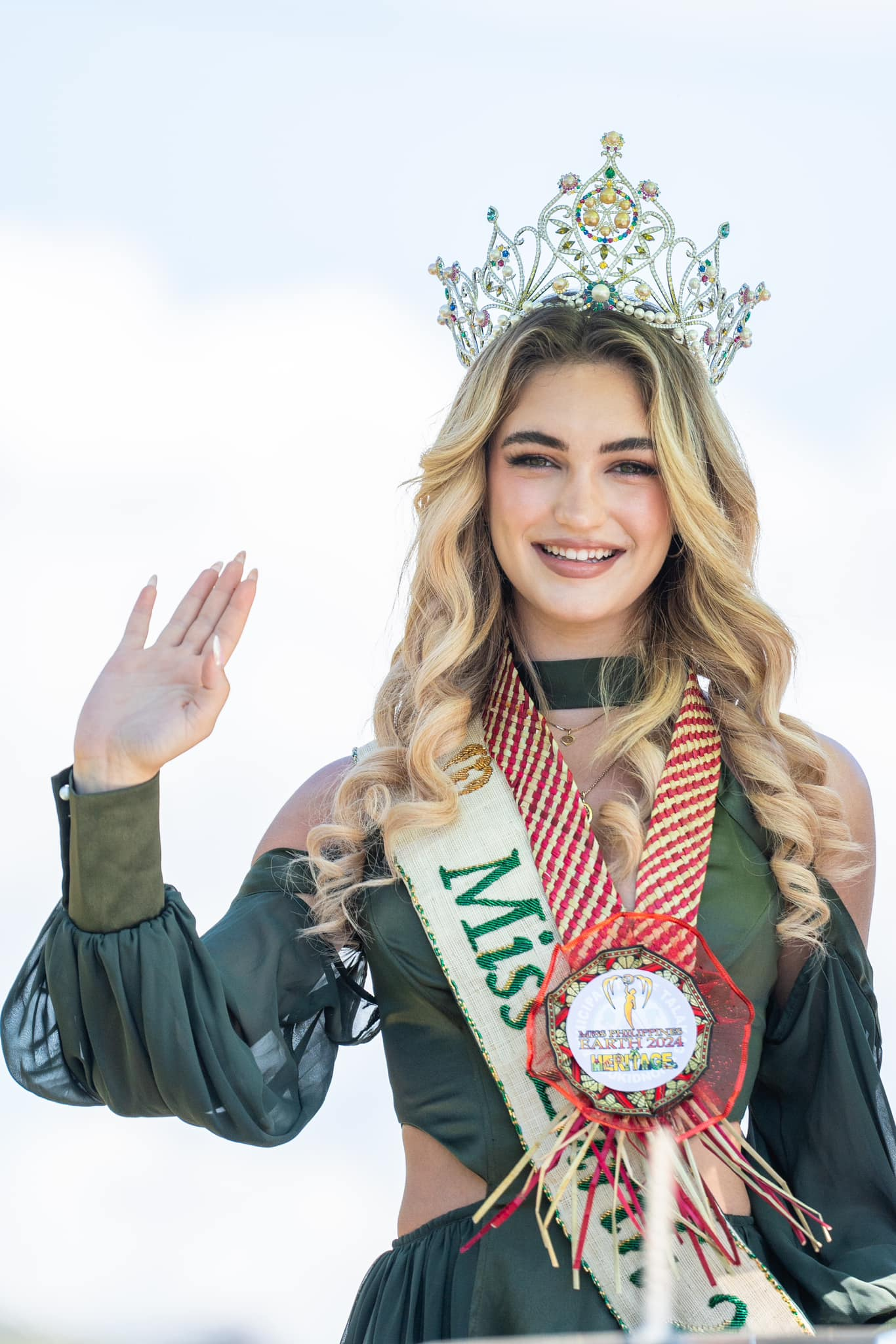
Beauty queen, model, and TV personality Drita Ziri won Miss Earth 2023. And became the first Albanian woman to win any of the Big Four international beauty pageants.

- Almeda Abazi (born 1992) – Miss Globe 2008
- Kleoniki Delijorgji (born 1996) – Miss Globe 2012
- Lorinda Kolgeci (born 1999) – Miss Globe 2020
- Hygerta Sako (born 1977) – semi-finalist at Miss Europe 1996
- Anisa Kospiri (born 1980) – Miss Universe 2002 Top 10
- Zana Krasniqi (born 1988) – Miss Universe 2008 Top 10
- Hasna Xhukiçi (born 1988) – Miss Universe 2009 Top 10
- Marigona Dragusha (born 1990) Miss Universe 2009 Second Runner Up
- Diana Avdiu (born 1993) – Miss Universe 2012 Top 16
- Claudia Conserva (born 1974) – Chilean actress, model and television presenter; of Arbëreshë) descent
- Angela Martini (born 1986) – Miss Universe 2010 Top 6
- Afërdita Dreshaj (born 1986) – Miss Universe 2011 Top 16
- Cindy Marina (born 1998) – Miss Universe 2019 Top 20
- Drita Ziri (born 2005) – Miss Earth 2023
- Martina Ivezaj (born 1991) – Miss World Germany 2012
- Egzonita Ala (born 1995) – Miss World Germany 2014
- Albjona Muharremaj (born 1996) – Miss World Germany 2015
- Adriana Gerxhalija (born 1992) – Miss World Finland 2017
- Erika Kolani (born 1996) – Miss World Greece 2019
- Leona Novoberdaliu (born 1997) – Miss World Slovakia 2020
- Cindy Toli (born 1993) – Greece's Next Top Model Season 2 Winner
- Aleksia Trajko (born 2003) – Greece's Next Top Model Season 7 Winner
- Angela Tanuzi (born 2002) – beauty queen
- Yllka Berisha (born 1990) – beauty queen
- Emina Cunmulaj (born 1984) – High Fashion Model in the USA
- Erjona Ala (born 1995) – High Fashion Model
- Endi Demneri (born 1999) – model and beauty queen
- Adrola Dushi (born 1993) – model and beauty queen
- Egla Harxhi (born 1991) – beauty queen
- Adelina Ismajli (born 1979) – model and singer
- Oriola Marashi (born 1996) – model and one of the main faces of Guess
- Trejsi Sejdini (born 2000) – beauty queen
- Mirjeta Shala (born 1994) – beauty queen
- Monika Zguro (born 1971) – beauty queen
- Ledina Çelo (born 1977) – model and singer

==== Television personalities ====
- Blendi Fevziu (born 1969) – television host
- Ardit Gjebrea (born 1963) – producer, television host, singer-songwriter
- Baton Haxhiu (born 1967) – journalist, television host
- Claudia Conserva (born 1974) – Chilean actress, model and television presenter; of Italian-Albanian (Arbëreshë) descent
- Benet Kaci (born 1978) – Kosovan television personality; from Kosovo
- Florina Kaja (born 1982) – American reality-television participant, singer and actress
- Drita D'Avanzo – reality TV star on the VH1 series Mob Wives

== Music ==
=== Composers ===
- Agim Krajka (1937–2021)
- Akil Mark Koci (born 1936)
- Aleksandër Peçi (born 1951)
- Avni Mula (1928–2020)
- Çesk Zadeja (1927–1997)
- Endri Sina (born 1967)
- Feim Ibrahimi (1935–1997)
- Gjon Simoni (1936–1999)
- Ibrahim Tukiqi (1926–2004)
- Kristo Kono (1907–1991)
- Lejla Agolli (born 1950)
- Limoz Dizdari (born 1942)
- Lorenc Antoni (1909–1991)
- Mustafa Krantja (1921–2002)
- Mustafa Krantja (1921–2002)
- Neço Muko (1899–1934)
- Nikolla Zoraqi (1921–1991)
- Palokë Kurti (1858–1920)
- Prenkë Jakova (1917–1969)
- Rexho Mulliqi (1923–1982)
- Simon Gjoni (1925–1991)
- Taip Kadiu (1928–2013)
- Thomas Simaku (born 1958)
- Tish Daija (1926–2004)
- Tonin Harapi (1925–1991)
- Vasil Tole (born 1963)

=== Pianists ===
- Ilir Bajri (born 1969)
- Lola Gjoka (1910-1985)
- Mariela Cingo (born 1978)
- Paul Leka (1943-2011)
- Pjetër Dungu (1908-1989)

=== Violinists ===
- Shkëlzen Doli (born 1971)

=== Guitarists ===
- Bledar Sejko (born 1985)
- Dren Abazi (born 1985)
- Faton Macula (born 1972)
- Petrit Çeku (born 1985)

=== Singers ===
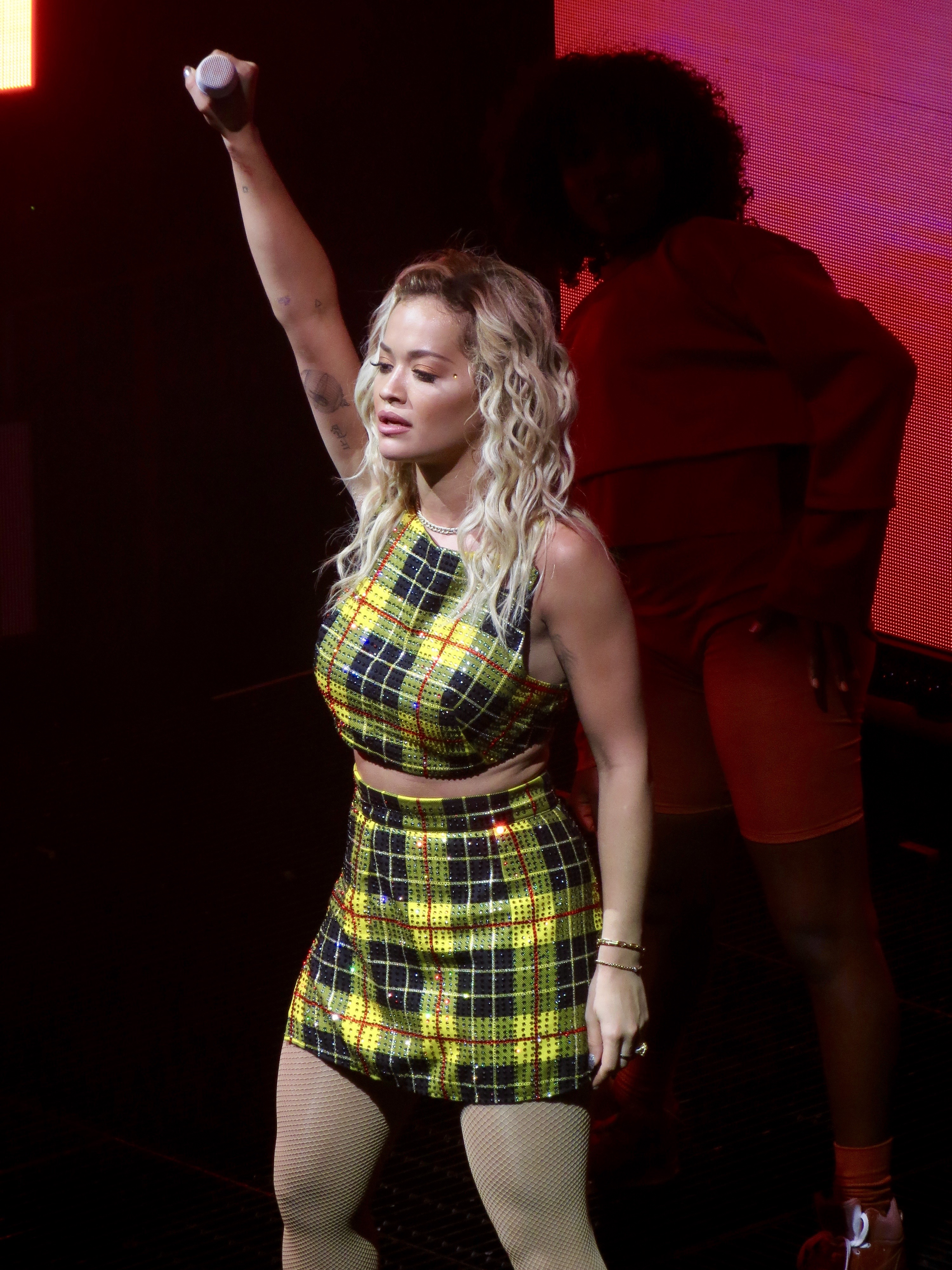
Rita Ora during a performance in Glasgow.

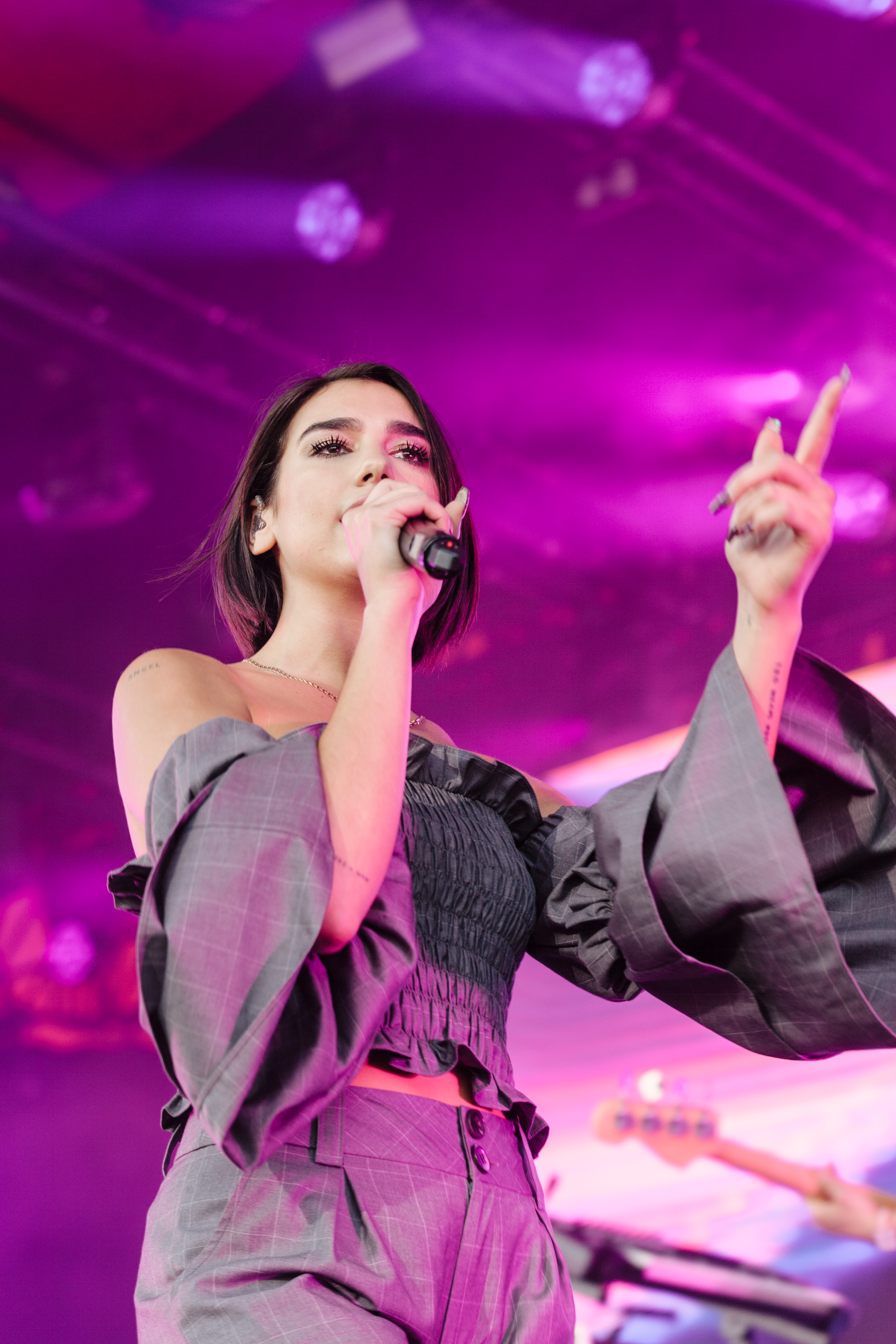
Dua Lipa at the Roskilde music festival.

- Action Bronson
- Adelina Ismajli
- Adrian Gaxha
- Adrian Lulgjuraj
- Alban Ramosaj
- Alban Skënderaj
- Albert Stanaj
- Albina Kelmendi
- Alida Hisku
- Alis
- Anjeza Shahini
- Antonia Iacobescu
- Anxhela Peristeri
- Anxhelina Hadërgjonaj
- Ardian Bujupi
- Arilena Ara
- Aurela Gaçe
- Ava Max
- Avni Mula
- Azet
- BARDHI
- Bebe Rexha
- Besa Kokëdhima
- Bledar Sejko
- Bleona
- Blerando
- Buta
- Butrint Imeri
- Capital T
- Çiljeta
- Claydee
- Dafina Zeqiri
- Dardan
- David Dreshaj
- Don Xhoni
- Dr. Flori
- Dren Abazi
- Dua Lipa
- Edita Aradinović
- Elai
- Eleni Foureira
- Elhaida Dani
- Eli Fara
- Elina Duni
- Elsa Lila
- Elvana Gjata
- Enca
- Eneda Tarifa
- Enisa Nikaj
- Era Istrefi
- Ermal Fejzullahu
- Ermal Meta
- Eugent Bushpepa
- Fero
- Fifi
- Fitnete Rexha
- Flaka Krelani
- Florat
- Flori Mumajesi
- Frederik Ndoci
- GASHI
- Genta Ismajli
- Gjon's Tears
- Hersi Matmuja
- Ilira Gashi
- Ingrid Gjoni
- Inis Neziri
- Irma Libohova
- Ismet Peja
- JMSN
- Jonida Maliqi
- Juliana Pasha
- Kastro Zizo
- Kejsi Tola
- Kidda
- Killua
- Laver Bariu
- Ledina Çelo
- Ledri Vula
- Leonora Jakupi
- Lindita
- Lindon Berisha
- Loredana Zefi
- Luiz Ejlli
- Lyrical Son
- Majk
- MC Kresha
- Melinda Ademi
- Mentor Xhemali
- Miriam Cani
- Mozzik
- Neço Muko
- Nexhmije Pagarusha
- Nikollë Nikprelaj
- Njomza
- Noizy
- Nora Istrefi
- Olta Boka
- Parashqevi Simaku
- Pirro Çako
- Rina Balaj
- Rita Ora
- Rona Nishliu
- Ronela Hajati
- Rosela Gjylbegu
- Rovena Stefa
- Shpat Kasapi
- Silva Gunbardhi
- Sin Boy
- Soni Malaj
- Tahir Gjoci
- Tayna
- Toquel
- Tuna
- Unikkatil
- Vaçe Zela
- Vanessa Krasniqi
- Vedat Ademi
- Vesa Luma
- Xhensila Myrtezaj
- Yll Limani
- Yon Idy
- Zana Nimani

=== Tenors and sopranos ===
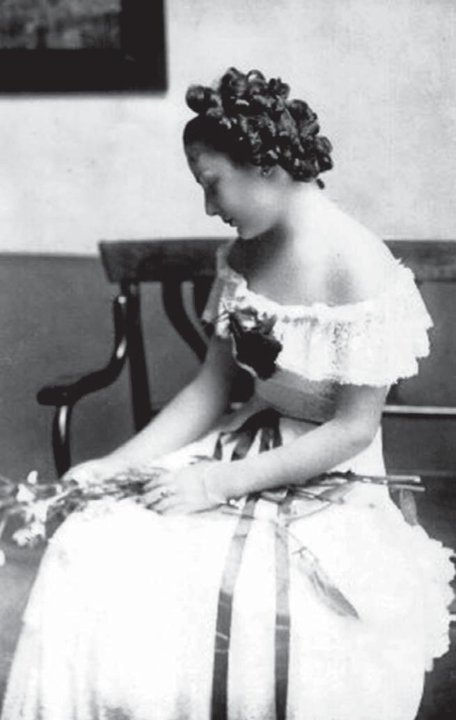
Tefta Tashko operatic singer of the pre-war period.

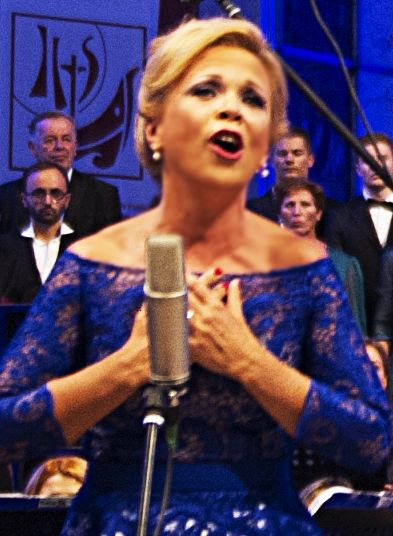
Inva Mula during a performance.

- Kristaq Antoniu (1907–1979)
- Gaqo Çako (1935 - 2018)
- Jorgjia Filçe-Truja (1907–1994)
- Agim Hushi (born 1964)
- Ermonela Jaho (born 1974) – described by The Economist as "the world's most acclaimed soprano".
- Tefta Tashko (1910–1947) – singer of the 1930s, was posthumously awarded the title People's Artist of Albania.
- Marie Kraja (1911–1999)
- Palokë Kurti (1858–1920)
- Inva Mula (born 1963) – known for portraying the voice of the Diva Plavalaguna in the film The Fifth Element
- Kristaq Paspali (1928–2001)
- Ramiz Kovaçi (1929–1994)
- Saimir Pirgu (born 1981) – Pirgu was recognized with the Franco Corelli award in 2009 in Ancona and with the "Pavarotti d'Oro Award" in 2013.

== Sports ==
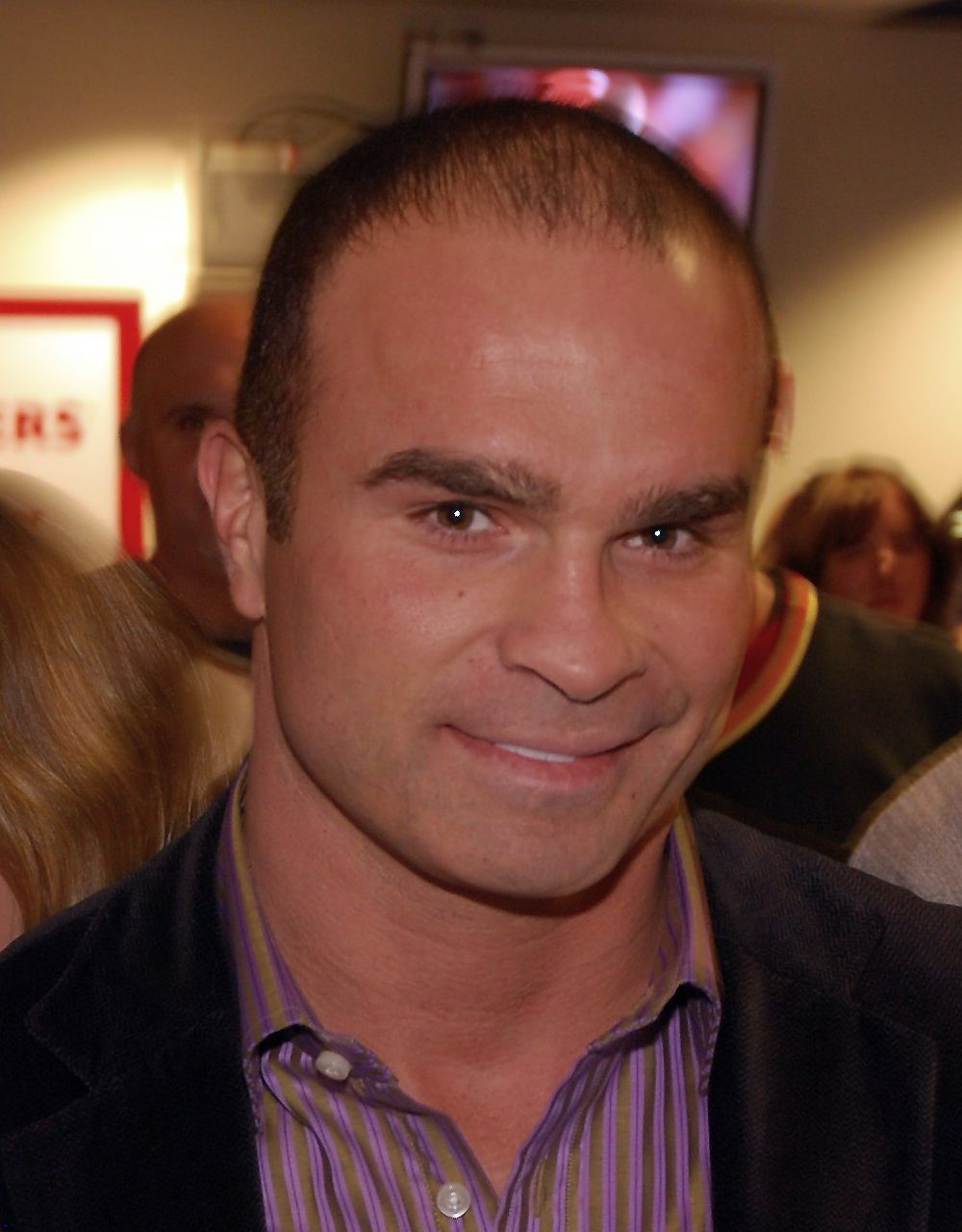
Tie Domi former professional ice hockey player known for his time as the enforcer of the Toronto Maple Leafs.

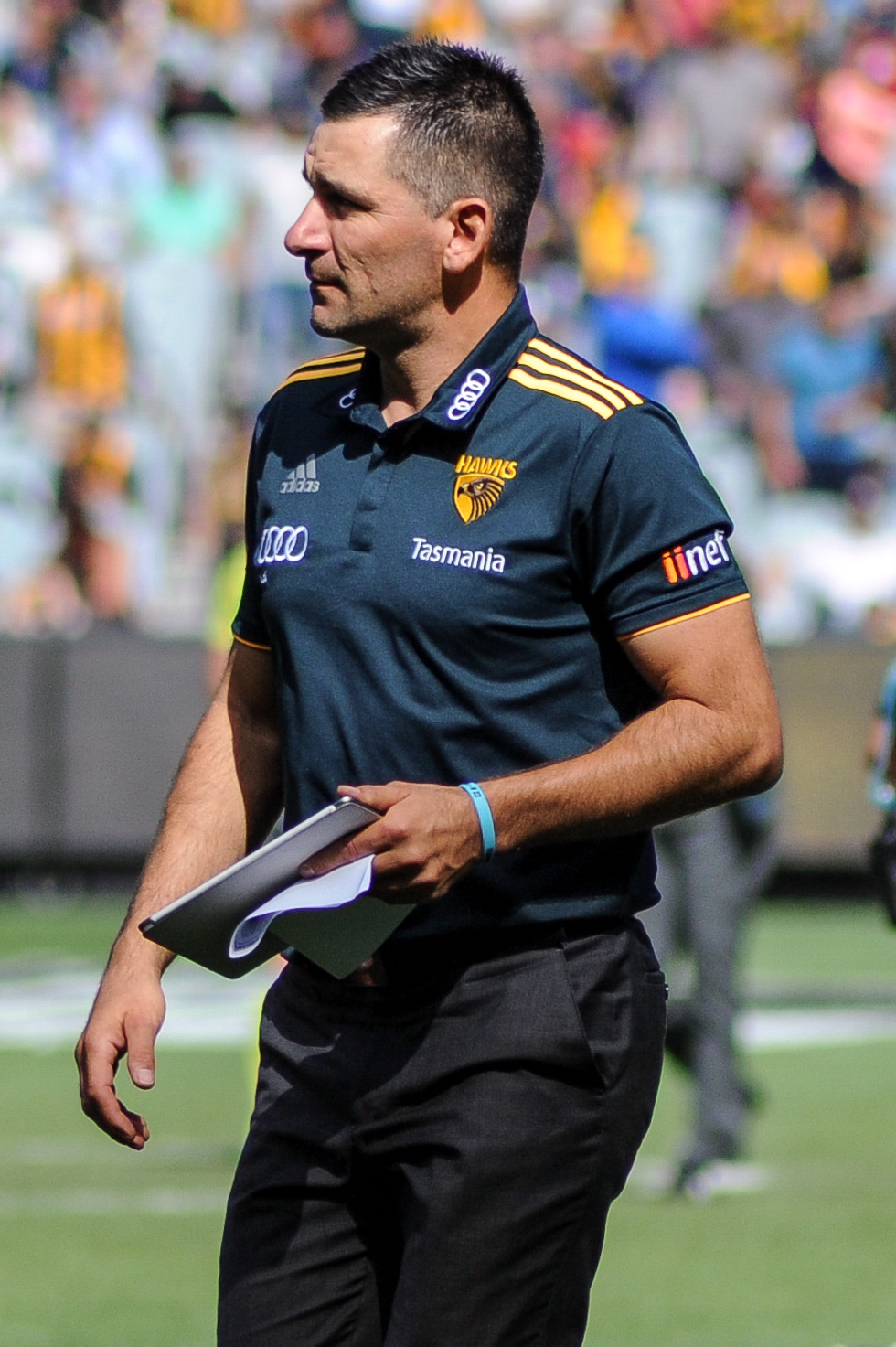
Australian rules footballer Adem Yze.

=== Football players and officials ===
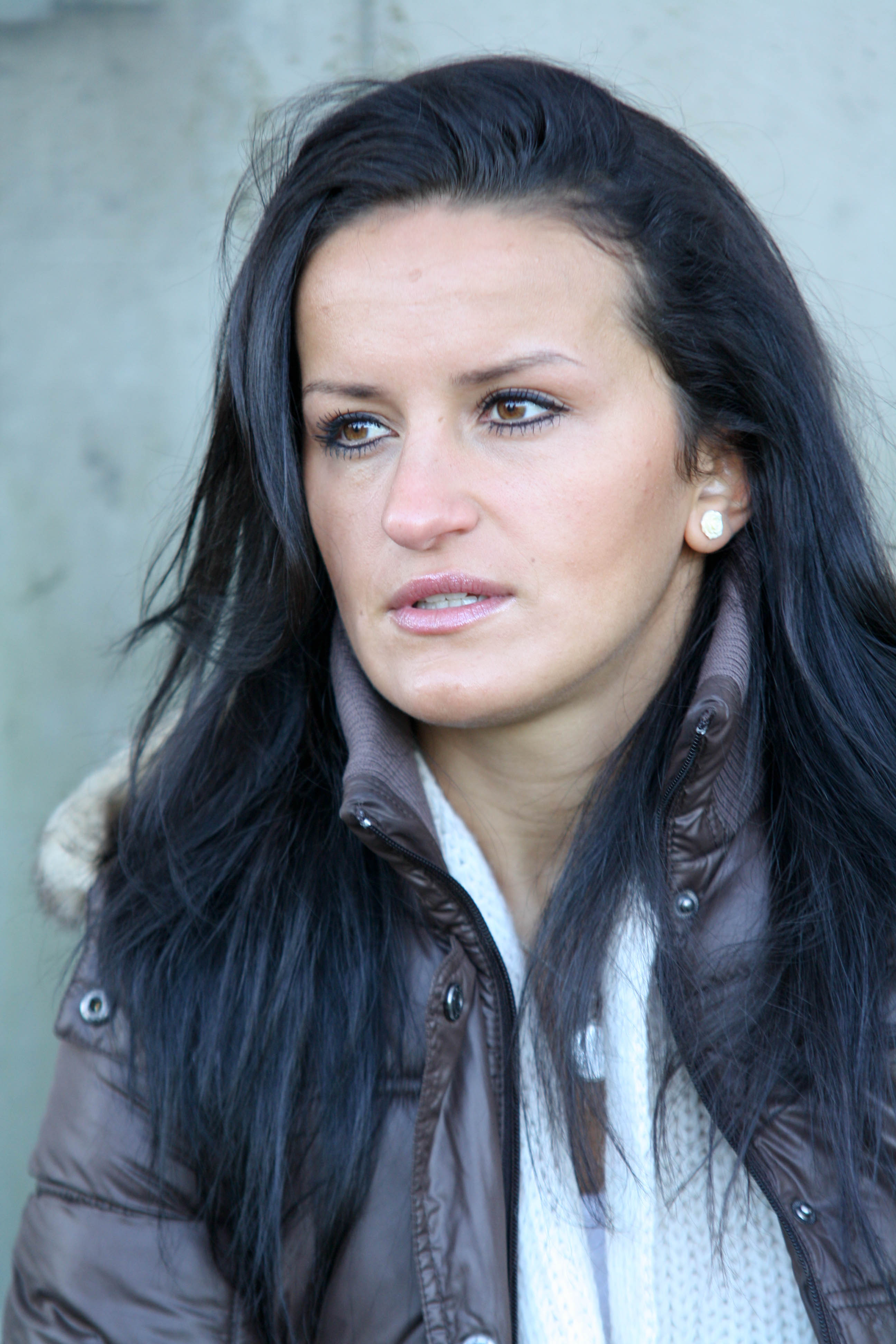
Fatmire Bajramaj former World Cup winning midfielder who placed third in the 2010 FIFA Ballon d'Or competition, an annual award given to the world's best player.

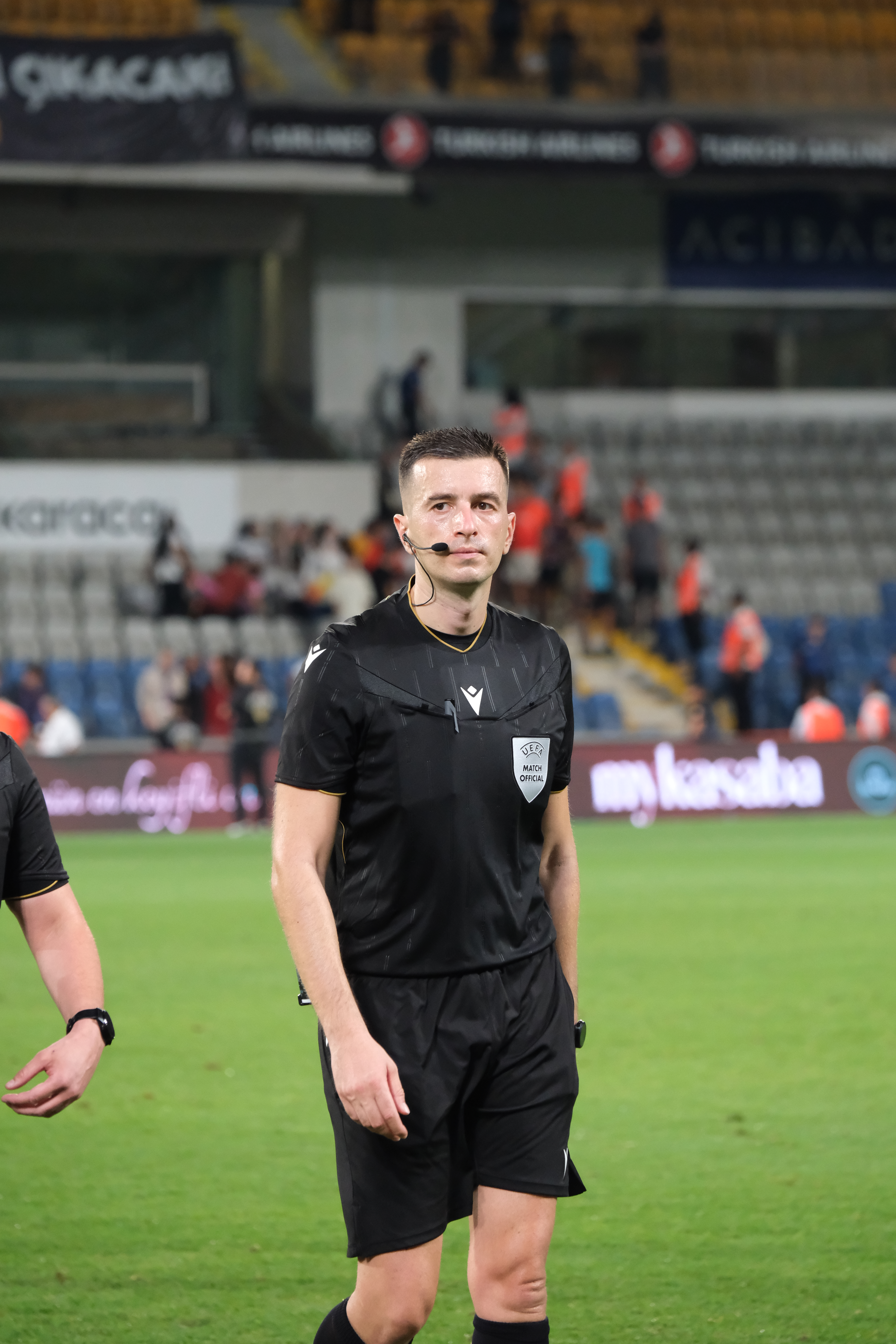
Referee Juxhin Xhaja is FIFA-listed since 2018

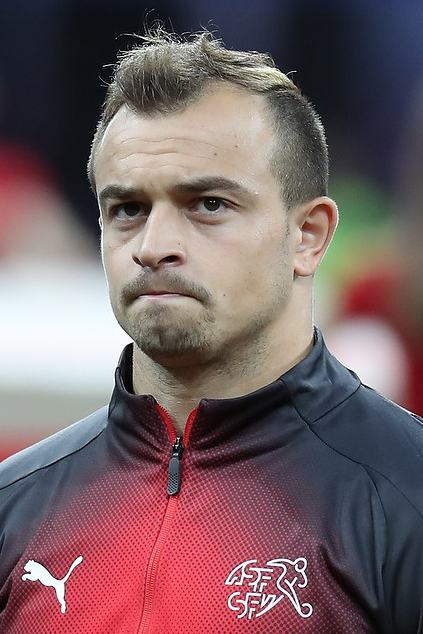
Footballer Xherdan Shaqiri was one of four players of Albanian descent who represented Switzerland at the 2018 FIFA World Cup.

- Admir Mehmedi (born 1991)
- Altin Rraklli (born 1970)
- Andi Lila (born 1986)
- Ansi Agolli (born 1982)
- Anxhelo Mumajesi (born 1997)
- Armando Sadiku (born 1991)
- Artim Shaqiri (born 1973)
- Besart Berisha (born 1985)
- Blerim Džemaili (born 1986)
- Cyme Lulaj (born 1989)
- Elseid Hysaj (born 1994)
- Erjon Bogdani (born 1977)
- Ervin Skela (born 1976)
- Fatmire Bajramaj (born 1988)
- Granit Xhaka (born 1992)
- Hamdi Salihi (born 1984)
- Igli Tare (born 1973)
- Kosovare Asllani (born 1989)
- Kristjan Asllani (born 2002)
- Lorik Cana (born 1983)
- Loro Boriçi (1922–1984)
- Mehmet Durakovic (born 1965)
- Migjen Basha (born 1987)
- Nedim Bajrami (born 1999)
- Panajot Pano (1939–2010)
- Perlat Musta (born 1958)
- Qemal Vogli (1929–2004)
- Rudi Vata (born 1969)
- Shkodran Mustafi (born 1992)
- Sulejman Demollari (born 1964)
- Taulant Xhaka (born 1991)
- Thomas Strakosha (born 1995)
- Valon Behrami (born 1985)
- Juxhin Xhaja (born 1990)
- Xherdan Shaqiri (born 1991)

=== Martial artists ===
- Azem Maksutaj – kickboxer
- Aziz Salihu – boxer
- Besim Kabashi – kickboxer
- Elis Guri – wrestler
- Enver Idrizi – Karate World Champion
- Ilir Latifi – MMA fighter
- Kreshnik Qato – boxer
- Luan Krasniqi – boxer
- Majlinda Kelmendi – judoka
- Naim Terbunja – boxer
- Nuri Seferi – boxer
- Gzim Selmani – MMA fighter and pro wrestler
- Sahit Prizreni – wrestler
- Shaban Sejdiu – wrestler
- Shaban Tërstena – wrestler
- Valdrin Vatnikaj – kickboxer
- Xhavit Bajrami – boxer and kickboxer

=== Other sports ===
- Adem Yze (born 1977) – Australian rules footballer
- Aldo Zadrima (born 1948) – former national chess champion
- Donald Suxho (born 1976) – US Olympic team volleyball player
- Emerson Jeka (born 2001) – Australian rules footballer
- Erjon Tola (born 1986) – Olympic skier
- Ermal Kuqo (born 1980) – basketball player for the Turkish team Anadolu Efes
- Frank Leskaj (born 1971) – Olympic swimmer
- Harley Reid (born 2005) – Australian rules footballer
- John Ibrahim (born 1943) – Australian rules footballer
- Linda Zetchiri (born 1987) – badminton player
- Molly Qerim (born 1984) – sports anchor and moderator for ESPN's First Take.
- Rrapush Papoj (born 1965) – cyclist, coach
- Tie Domi (born 1969) – ice hockey player

== Ottoman era Albanians ==
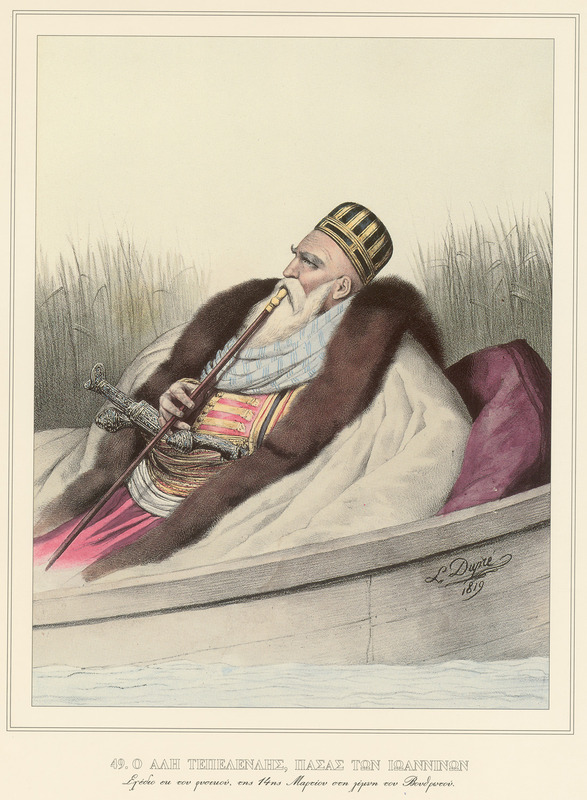
Ali Pasha of Ioannina was an Ottoman Albanian ruler who served as pasha of a large part of western Rumelia, the Ottoman Empire's European territories, which was referred to as the Pashalik of Yanina.

- Marinus Becichemus Scodrensis – Venetian-Albanian chronicler
- Hayreddin Barbarossa (c. 1478–1546), Ottoman-Albanian Admiral(Possible)
- Safiye Sultan (mother of Mehmed III) (1550–1619) – Haseki Sultan and the Valide Sultan of the Ottoman Empire. One of the most Influential Woman in Ottoman History.
- Sedefkar Mehmed Agha (1540–1617)
- Ballaban Badera – commander of Ottoman Empire
- Marin Barleti – historian and Catholic priest; considered the first Albanian historian, especially because of his biography on Skanderbeg, translated in many languages in the 16th to the 18th centuries
- Bekim Berisha
- Bardhok Biba
- Isa Boletini
- Ibrahim Bushati
- Kara Mahmud Bushati (1740–1796)
- Mehmed Bushati
- Mustafa Bushati
- Prek Cali
- Dervish Cara – leader of the Albanian Revolt of 1843–1844
- Pope Clement XI (Giovanni Francesco Albani) (1649–1721)
- Bajram Curri
- Ahmet Delia (1850–1913) – freedom fighter
- Ali Demi (1918–1943)
- Nicholas Pal Dukagjini – prince and member of Dukagjini family
- Lekë Dukagjini – prince and member of Dukagjini family; contemporary of Skanderbeg; known for the Kanuni i Lekë Dukagjinit, a code of law instituted in northern Albania
- Pal Engjëlli – Catholic clergyman; Archbishop of Durrës and Cardinal of Albania; in 1462, wrote the first known document retrieved so far in the Albanian language
- Mehmet Âkif Ersoy (1873–1936) – of Albanian descent
- Nezim Frakulla (1680–1760)
- Shote Galica
- Carl Ritter von Ghega (1802–1860) – designer of the Semmering Railway
- George Ghica – founder of the Ghica family
- Shtjefën Gjeçovi (1873–1929) – Catholic priest, ethnologist and folklorist; known for being the father of Albanians' folklore studies
- Luigj Gurakuqi
- Hamëz Jashari
- Branko Kadija
- Hamza Kastrioti
- Ali Kelmendi
- Ded Gjo Luli
- Iljas Mirahori (1408–1512)
- Hasan Moglica (1854–1915) – also known as Hoxhë Moglica scholar, educator, leader, engineer, philosopher, patriot, nationalist figure proclaimed "martyr of Albanian language and nation" by the Albanian government
- Selam Musai
- Bule Naipi
- Zahir Pajaziti
- Ahmet Kurt Pasha
- Ali Pasha of Tepelena (1740–1822)
- Ali Pasha of Gucia (1828–1885)
- Edhem Pasha (1851–1909)
- Ibrahim Pasha of Berat
- Ibrahim Pasha of Egypt (1789–1848)
- Kara Murat Pasha
- Koca Davud Pasha (14??–1498)
- Köprülü Fazıl Ahmed Pasha (1635–1676)
- Köprülü Mehmed Pasha (1575–1661)
- Lütfi Pasha (1488–1564) – grand vizier of Ottoman Empire
- Mahmud Dramali Pasha (1780–1822)
- Muhammad Ali of Egypt (1769–1849)
- Ismail Kemal (1844–1919) – leader of the Albanian national movement; founder of the modern Albanian state and its first head of state and government
- Mustafa Reshiti
- Perlat Rexhepi
- Haxhi Shehreti
- Hodo Sokoli (1836–1883)
- Karl Topia (1331–1388) – prince of Albania
- Pretash Zekaj Ulaj (known as Pretash Zekaj)
- Mujo Ulqinaku
- Cafo Beg Ulqini
- Vrana Konti (Count Vrana) (1442–1458) – Skanderbeg's general
- Omer Vrioni
- Muhamet Xhemajli
- Tahir Zemaj

== Others ==
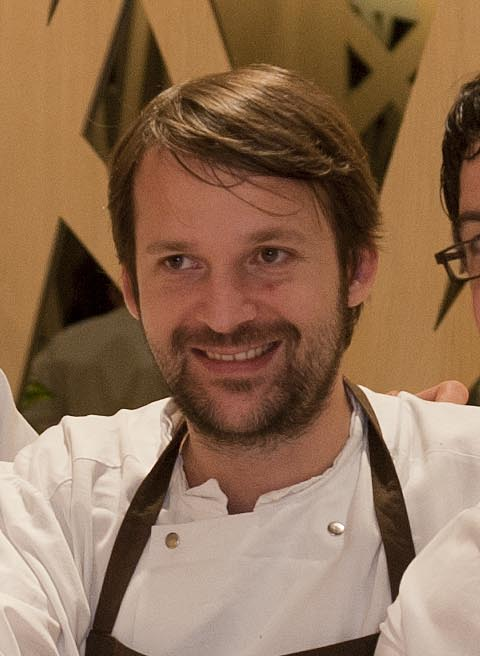
Albanian-Danish chef René Redzepi founded the two-Michelin star restaurant Noma in 2003.

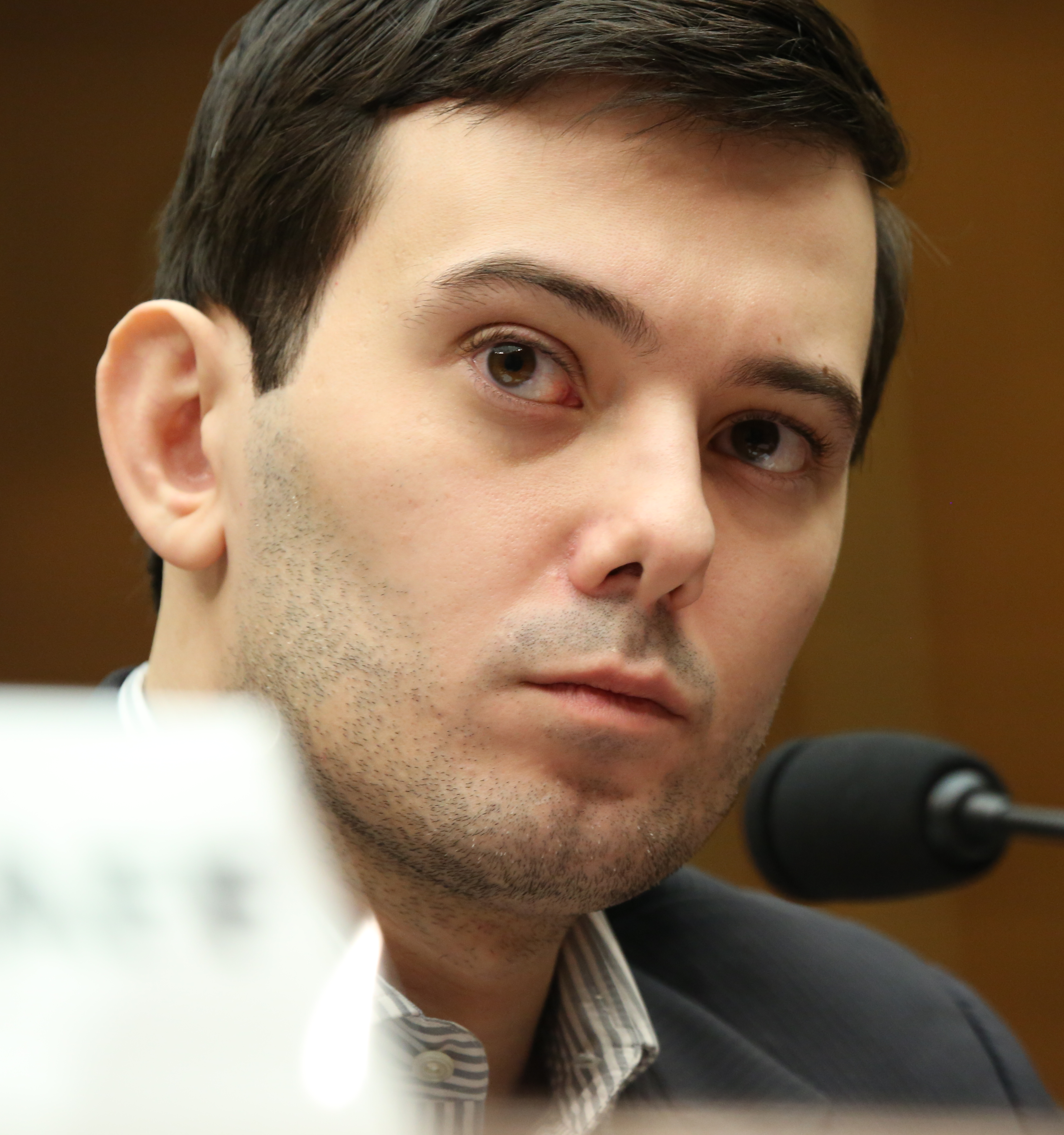
Martin Shkreli gained notoriety for raising the price of life-saving drug Daraprim by 5,000 percent.

- Joseph Ardizzone (born 1884, vanished 1931) – organized crime boss
- Joseph J. DioGuardi (born 1940) – American certified public accountant and a Republican politician; his family traces its roots to the Arbëreshë people
- Kara DioGuardi (born 1970) – American contemporary composer of Albanian descent
- Donald Lambro (1940–2023) – American journalist; chief political correspondent of The Washington Times; columnist nationally syndicated by United Feature Syndicate
- Laura Mersini-Houghton – Theoretical Physicist-Cosmologist; Professor at the University of North Carolina at Chapel Hill
- Martin Shkreli (born 1983) – Pharma executive and convict.

== See also ==
- List of Kosovo Albanians
- Albanian Australians
- Albanians in Austria
- Albanians in Belgium
- Albanians in Bosnia and Herzegovina
- Albanians in Bulgaria
- Albanians in Canada
- Albanians of Croatia
- Albanians in Egypt
- Albanians in France
- List of Albanians in Germany
- Albanian communities in Greece
- Albanians in Hungary
- Albanians in Italy
- Albanians in the Netherlands
- Albanians in the Nordic countries
- Albanians of Romania
- Albanians in Serbia
- Albanians in South America
- Albanians in Syria
- Albanians in Switzerland
- Albanians in Turkey
- Albanians in Ukraine
- Albanians in the United Kingdom
- Albanians in the United States

=== Native communities ===
- Arbanasi
- Arbëreshë people
- Arvanites
- Cham Albanians
- Albanians in Kosovo
- Albanians in Montenegro
- Albanians in North Macedonia
