= List of Albanian academics =

This is a list of Albanian academics.

== Academics ==
- Eshref Ademaj (1940–1994)
- Fatmir Agalliu (1933–1998)
- Idriz Ajeti (1917–2019)
- Gëzim Alpion (born 1962)
- Mehdi Bardhi (1927–1994)
- Anton Berisha (born 1946)
- Eqrem Çabej (1908–1980)
- Shaban Demiraj (1920–2014)
- Albert Doja (born 1957)
- Andrea Ekonomi (1879–1934)
- Ibrahim Gashi (born 1963)
- Petro Janura (1911–1983)
- Dhori Kule (born 1957)
- Skënder Luarasi (1900–1982)
- Sehadete Mekuli (1928–2013)
- Paskal Milo (born 1949)
- Adrian Neritani (born 1967)
- Edmond Panariti (born 1960)
- Ylli Pango (born 1952)
- Aurel Plasari (born 1956)
- Rexhep Qosja (born 1936)
- Namik Resuli (1908–1985)
- Dhimitër Shuteriqi (1915–2003)
- Abdulla Tafa (1947–2015)
- Myqerem Tafaj (born 1957)
- Xhezair Teliti (born 1948)
- Kolë Xhumari (1912–2006)
