= List of magazines in Albania =

Following the collapse of the communist regime in Albania in 1991, the number of magazines increased. It was 71 in 2001 based on the data of the Albanian Media Institute in Tirana. In the following year it was 70. In terms of frequency, the magazines were mostly weekly, bimonthly and quarterly.

The following is an incomplete list of current and defunct magazines published in Albania. They may be published in Albanian or in other languages.

== A ==
- AKS
- Albania
- Albanian Journal of Natural and Technical Sciences
- Albanian Observer
- Albania Today
- Aleph

== D ==
- Drita

== F ==
- Fiamuri Arbërit
- Fjala e Tokësorit

== G ==
- Gjuha Jonë
- Gazeta e Pavarur

== H ==
- Hosteni
- Hylli i Dritës

== K ==
- Klan
- Kritika
- Kultura Popullore

== L ==
- Les lettres albanaises

== M ==
- Mapo
- Mehr Licht
- Monitor

== O ==
- OK! Albania

== P ==
- Përpjekja
- Përpjekja shqiptare

== S ==
- Spekter
- Studia Albanica
- Studime Filologjike
- Studime Historike

== See also ==
List of newspapers in Albania
