= Gjuha Shqipe =

Albanian scientific magazine

The Albanian Language
- Editor in chief: Qemal Murati
- Publisher: Albanological Institute of Prishtina
- Founded: 1982
- Company: Ace
- Country: Kosovo
- Based in: Prishtina
- Language: Albanian
- ISSN: 0352-1109
- OCLC: 21486356

Gjuha Shqipe is a scientific magazine published by the Albanological Institute. It focuses on topics related to the Albanian language, its purification, spread, and development, and possible changes on its standard form.

The magazine started in 1982. The necessity for a such magazine came due to difficulties that the linguistic situation in Kosovo, North Macedonia, and other Albanian inhabited areas inside Yugoslavia. The Albanological Institute in Prishtina called a symposium to deal with the Albanian language issues raised so far, in December 1980. One of the outcomes of the symposium was the decision to create a magazine which would constantly visit the topics discussed. The magazine was named Gjuha Shqipe (The Albanian Language), similarly to the one which was recently coming out in Tirana, named Gjuha Jonë (Our Language), published back than by the Institute of Linguistics ad Literature (Albanian: Instituti i Gjuhësisë dhe Letërsisë).

Since then, it has given a major contribute in the enhancement of the Albanian language. The editorial staff has always solicited collaborators outside of former Yugoslavian republics, in Albania, in Arbereshe communities, and elsewhere, being a major characteristic of the magazine. Out of 278 contributors names, 108 are from Albania. This because of the same standard and literary issues that the Albanian language faced and still does in general, and the editorial's goal of keeping the newspaper open to all and not local.

The frequency of the newspaper has varied in time due to political situation that the Albanological Institute encountered from 1982 till today. 3 volumes were published in 2015.

== Editors in chief ==
- Idriz Ajeti 1982–1986
- Shaqir Berani 1987–1988
- Qemal Murati 1989–1990
- Ragip Mulaku 1997-2004
- Qemal Murati 2005-

== See also ==
- University of Prishtina
- Gjurmime Albanologjike
- Studime Filologjike
