= Albanian Orthography Congress =

Linguistics conference (1972-)

- Native name: Kongresi i Drejtshkrimit të Gjuhës Shqipe
- Date: November 20–25, 1972
- Location: Tirana, People's Socialist Republic of Albania
- Theme: One Nation, One Language
- Cause: To establish a unified standard of written Albanian
- Organised by: Institute of Linguistics and Literature
- Participants: 87
- Outcome: The establishment of the Standardized Albanian language

The Albanian Orthography Congress (Albanian: Kongresi i Drejtshkrimit të Gjuhës Shqipe) was a linguistics event held in Tirana, People's Republic of Albania, in 1972. It established for the first time the unified orthographic rules of the Albanian language which are still in use today.

== Background ==
The efforts of establishing unified orthographic rules for the Albanian language had started in 1916 with the Literary Commission, in Shkodër, which aimed mainly in establishing a literary standard and established an "as phonetic as possible" approach of the future set of orthographic rules. After World War II, the differences and divergences between writing from within Albania and its adjacent Albanian populated regions were becoming visible. With the establishment of the University of Prishtina and the spread of Albanian literature in Yugoslavia, the unification of orthographic rules became crucial. Serious attempts were made in the 60s toward the standardization, starting with the publication Rregullat e drejtshkrimit të shqipes (Rules of Albanian language orthography) by a joint project of the University of Tirana and the Institute of Linguistics and Literature led by Androkli Kostallari. A conference was held in Pristina in 1968, the Linguistic Conference of Pristina (Alb: Konsulta gjuhësore e Prishtinës), where the literary standard used so far in Albania and based in the Tosk Albanian dialect was adopted by the Albanians of Yugoslavia at the expense of the Gheg dialect.

== Event ==
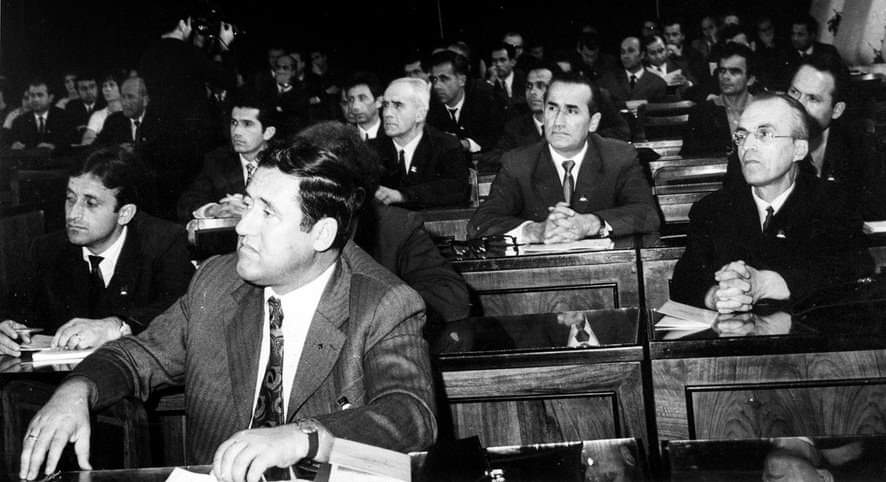
Photo from one of the sessions, November 1972

The congress took place in Tirana from 20 to 25 November 1972. Its moto was "One nation, one language". It was organized by the Institute of Linguistics and Literature (Instituti i gjuhësisë) and the University of Tirana. 87 delegates from Albania, Yugoslavia, and Arbëreshë participated. The congress issued a resolution which established the rules and principles of the standard Albanian orthography as developed up to that time. The conclusions of the congress were further elaborated by a post-deployment commission (Androkli Kostallari, Eqerem Çabej, Mahir Domi, Emil Lafe) which published and distributed the volumes Orthography of the Albanian language (Alb: Drejtshkrimi i gjuhës shqipe) of 1973 and Orthographic dictionary of the Albanian language (Alb: Fjalor drejtshkrimor i gjuhës shqipe) of 1976.

The standard established by the congress is still in place today with very few changes by other recent Albanian language-related conferences.

== Notable participants ==
The following list of notable participants were signatories of the decision adopted by the congress of the new orthographic standards:

- Thoma Deliana, Minister of Education and Culture of Albania.
- Androkli Kostallari, director of the Institute of Linguistics and Literature of Albania.
- Mahir Domi, linguist and pedagogue, head of the grammar and dialectology sections of the Institute of Linguistics and Literature.
- Eqrem Çabej, linguist and albanologist.
- Idriz Ajeti, dean of the Faculty of Philosophy of the University of Pristina.
- Dhimitër Shuteriqi, chairman of the Albanian League of Writers and Artists.
- Aleks Buda, historian.
- Rexhep Qosja, director of the Albanological Institute of Pristina.
- Shaban Demiraj, member of the organizing commission, director of the Linguistics Catedra of the University of Tirana.
- Emil Lafe, linguist.
- Ali Abdihoxha, writer and director of the Naim Frashëri Publishing House
- Giuseppe Ferrari, theologian and priest of the Italo-Albanian Catholic Church, pedagogue of the Albanian language in the University of Bari.
- Bedri Dedja, deputy Minister of Education and Culture of Albania.
- Dritëro Agolli, writer.
- Dhimitër (Miço) Samara, linguist of the Institute of Linguistics and Literature of Albania.
- Fatmir Gjata, writer.
- Isa Bajcinca, pedagogue of the Albanian language in the Faculty of Philosophy in Pristina.
- Ismail Kadare, writer.
- Jakov Xoxa, writer.
- Jorgo Bulo, historian of the Albanian literature from the Institute of Linguistics and Literature of Albania.
- Koço Bihiku, deputy Director of the Institute of Linguistics and Literature of Albania.
- Lasgush Poradeci, poet.
- Llazar Siliqi, poet.
- Osman Myderrizi, linguist and veteran teacher.
- Petro Janura, Director of the Albanian Language Catedra of the University of Skopje, former editor-in-chief of the Flaka e vëllazërimit (Flame of Brotherhood) newspaper, and editor-in-chief of the Jehona (Echo) newspaper in Skopje.
- Sterjo Spasse, writer.
- Shevqet Musaraj, writer.
- Xhevat Lloshi, linguist of the Institute of Linguistics and Literature of Albania.
- Zihni Sako, Director of the Institute of Folklore of Albania.
- Besim Bokshi, Director of the High Pedagogical Institute in Gjakova, Kosovo.

== Importance ==
The congress was a milestone event in the history of the Albanian language. The unification of orthography was crucial for the identity of the Albanian language. It was considered a big success the encompassing of the Yugoslavia-based literature and press under the umbrella of the linguistic authorities of Tirana, thus contributing in a stronger unified Albanian identity.

== Criticism ==
Arshi Pipa, was one of the strongest critics of the time toward the congress and the rules that came out if it, due to the deprivation of Gheg element in favour of the Tosk one. Similar discussions continue as to date. In addition to the limitations induced by the young age of the academic institutions in the Albanian world, deep concerns were raised due to the delegate selection criteria to meet the communist political agenda, participation of simple elementary school teachers without any academic background, low number of academic titles of the delegates in overall, as well as non-specific Albanian language concentration of the ones that did have academic titles. Concretely, 72 out of 85 did not have a scientific degree, out of 15 others 5 of them had scientific degrees in other fields (not linguistics). Out of 5 linguists with scientific degrees, one was on Russian language (Kostallari). For the rest, over 2/3 of the delegates had the only foreign language the Russian language or the Serbo-Croatian one. 37 of the delegates did not make it to enter the Albanian Encyclopedic Dictionary (Alb: Fjalori Enciklopedik Shqiptar).

Many other researchers and albanologists have reacted in favor of the congress's decisions, sending petitions to Prime Minister Edi Rama that the standard should not be revised. Kristo Frashëri, Albania's main personality in the field of history, rejected any criticism. According to Frashëri, "the language is not a monopoly of the linguists, it belongs to all those who speak the language, the standard has incorporated many aspects of the Gheg dialect as well, and that two orthography standards would lead to two separate nations, just like Croats and Serbs".

== See also ==
- Congress of Manastir
