= Studime Filologjike =

Philological Studies
- Frequency: Currently: quarterly
- Publisher: Albanian Institute of Linguistics and Literature
- Founded: 1964
- Country: Albania
- Based in: Tirana
- Language: Albanian, French, English
- ISSN: 0563-5780
- OCLC: 2268583

Studime Filologjike ("Philological Studies") is a scientific magazine on Albanian language and literature, published by the Centre of Albanological Studies. It publishes linguistics studies, literary historical studies, old texts, resumes of scientific work on literature criticism and linguistics, etc.

== History ==
The magazine started as Buletini i Institutit të Studimeve (Bulletin of the Institute of Studies), published by the Albanian Institute of History established in 1946, representing the first scientific institute in post World War II Albania. It had separate sections for linguistics, literary studies, and history. After the first issue with this name, it promptly changed to Buletin i Institutit të Shkencave (Bulletin of the Institute of Sciences), published by the Albanian Institute of Science (1948-1957) which had replaced the Institute of Studies. The magazine preserved it previous structure. In 1952, it split in two separate publications: Buletini për Shkencat Natyrore (Bulletin for the Natural Sciences), and Bulletini për Shkencat Shoqërore (Bulletin for Social Studies). The later one focused on linguistics, history, archaeology, ethnography, etc. Articles started being accompanied by a resume in French.

In 1955, the corresponding sections of social studies merged into the Albanian Institute of History and Linguistics (Albanian: Instituti i Historisë dhe i Gjuhësisë), which affiliated with the University of Tirana during 1957-1972. During 1957-1964, the magazine came out as Buletin i Universitetit të Tiranës - seria shkencat shoqërore (Bulletin of the University of Tirana - series on social studies). After 1964, the Institute of History and Linguistics started publishing Studime Historike, and the other magazine Studime filologjike (Philological studies), both quarterly. The articles were followed by a resume in English or French.

With the establishment of the Albanian Academy of Sciences in 1972, the Institute of History and Linguistics split into the Instituti i Historisë (Institute of History) and Instituti i Gjuhës dhe Letërsisë (Institute of Linguistics and Literature) which served as the main institutions of albanology, both affiliated with the Academy of Sciences. In 2008, the Institute was disaffiliated with the Albanian Academy of Sciences, joining the Centre of Albanological Studies.

== Notable contributors ==
- Jorgji Gjinari
- Androkli Kostallari
- Dhimitër Shuteriqi
- Eqerem Çabej
- Koço Bihiku
- Mahir Domi
- Spiro Floqi
- Shaban Demiraj
- Zihni Sako
- Gjovalin Shkurtaj
- Jorgo Bulo

== See also ==
- Gjuha Jonë
- Kultura Popullore
- List of magazines in Albania
