= Çelo Hoxha =

Albanian historian and author

- Citizenship: Albania
- Education: Institute of History, Academy of Albanological Studies (MA, PhD)
- Occupations: Historian; Journalist & columnist
- Organization: Institute for the Study of the Crimes and Consequences of Communism (ISKK)
- Known for: Research on the history of the communist regime in Albania

Çelo Hoxha is an Albanian historian and author, who has served as director of the Institute for the Study of the Crimes and Consequences of Communism (ISKK), and is known for his research on the political repression during the communist period in Albania.

== Life and career ==
Hoxha studied and received master and doctoral degrees at the Institute of History of the Academy of Albanological Studies in Tirana.

His work concentrates on documenting political persecution, statal institutions, and other mechanisms of repression under communist Albania, with a particular interest on what he calls "the illigitimacy of communist power in Albania".

Hoxha has been and employee of ISKK since its establishment in 2010, participating in institutional activities and public exhibitions addressing communist-era persecutions, and subsequently has served in various leadership roles, including as deputy director and then director. As director of ISKK he has emphasized the need for a clearer teaching of the communist dictatorship in Albanian school curricula, focusing on history education and collective memory.

Hoxha is the author of numerous studies and articles, and has contributed to large-scale projects such as the multi-volume Encyclopedia of Victims of Communist Terror, published by ISKK.

His 2014 book "Crimes of the Communists during the War, 1941-45" (Albanian: "Krimet e komunistëve gjatë luftës në vitet 1941-1945"), sparked a public debate 5 years after being published, and has been one of the most debated study books in the post-communist period in Albania.

Besides his academic activity, he has also worked as a journalist and columnist for different newspapers.
