= Androkli Kostallari =

Albanian linguist and scholar (1922–1992)

- Androkli Kostallari in 1981
- Born: 7 November 1922; Leusë, Përmet, Albania
- Died: 22 March 1992 (aged 69); Tirana, Albania
- Occupation: Academic

Androkli Kostallari (7 November 1922 – 22 March 1992) was an Albanian linguist and scholar. He was one of the central figures of the Albanian language studies and founding member and director of the Albanian Institute of History and Linguistics, and later Institute of Linguistics and Literature (Alb: Instituti i Gjuhësisë dhe Letërsisë). Kostallari is remembered for being one of the key expert contributor to the present Albanian language orthography established by the Congress of Orthography of 1972.

== Life and work ==
Kostallari was born in Leusë near Përmet. He pursued his high school studies in Shkodër and later in Tirana. An active participant of the National Liberation Movement during World War II, he worked in the post-war press-organs where he succeeded in management positions though at a young age.

He studied philology in the Lomonosov Moscow State University, where he studied Russian language and literature profiling in journalism, and graduating in 1954. Upon his return in Albania he started working in the Institute of Sciences (Alb: Instituti i Shkencave), a precursor of the Academy of Sciences of Albania, and later in the Faculty of History and Philology of the newly founded University of Tirana where he would later reach the position of the dean.

In 1958, he was elected as Director of the Institute of History and Linguistics (Alb: Instituti i Historisë dhe i Gjuhësisë) of Tirana, and after it was restructured, the Institute of Linguistics and Literature (Alb: Instituti i Gjuhësisë dhe i Letërsisë) until 1990. He served as editor-in-chief of the Studime filologjike magazine during 1964–1991, and Studia albanica during 1964–1980. Kostallari was also one of the founding members of the Academy of Sciences of Albania in 1972 and its presidium.

The main focus of his scientific and pedagogic work was on the linguistics fields lexicology and lexicography, word formation, onomastics, general linguistics, and the history of the literary Albanian language. He served as chief of the Lexicology and Lexicography section of the University of Tirana during 1955–1990. He was also the scientific director of the two Albanian dictionaries: Fjalor i gjuhës së sotme shqipe (Dictionary of today's Albanian language) of 1980, and Fjalor i shqipes së sotme (Dictionary of present Albanian language) of 1984.

Another field where Kostallari contributed was the history of the formation and development of the literary standard of the Albanian language, and its structural and functional characteristics. He was part of the commission which drafted the "Orthography of the Albanian language" in 1956, head of the commission for the project Rules of the Albanian Orthography of 1967, Chairman of the Congress of Orthography of 1972, director the later commissions of the orthography of 1973 and Orthographic dictionary of 1976. He was also co-aithor of various terminology dictionaries.

In 1960 he became member of the International Council of Onomastic Sciences, in 1963 member of the AIESEE (Association Internationale d'Etudes du Sud-Est Europeen) where he would also become member of its bureau in 1974 and vice-president.

Kostallari was also the author of the new Albanian personal names dictionary (or list), still very popular today as a source of first names.

== Awards and titles ==
- Doctor Honoris Causa from the University of Gothenburg.
- "Çmimi i Republikës të Shkallës së Parë" (English: First Grade Republic Prize), twice.
- "Mësues i Popullit" (English: People's Teacher).

== See also ==
- Idriz Ajeti
- Francesco Altimari
- Shaban Demiraj
- Mahir Domi
- Eqrem Çabej
