= Selman Riza =

Albanian linguist

Selman Riza (1909–1988) was an Albanian linguist and Albanologist. Riza was one of the founding members of the Albanological Institute of Pristina in 1953.

== Early life ==
Selman Riza was born in Yakova (now Gjakova), Ottoman Empire on 21 December 1909. In 1922 he migrated to Albania, where he first studied in the "Naim Frashëri" school. At the time of his graduation in 1925 he was honored as the best student of the school and gained a scholarship in the National Lyceum of Korçë in 1925. As Riza graduated three years earlier than the regular duration of the studies the lyceum's director Leon Perre suggested him for the annual scholarship of the ministry of education. In 1931 he gained a scholarship in the University of Toulouse, where in three years he graduated from both the faculties of French language and literature and that of law. Later he studied in the University of Heidelberg, where he graduated from the faculty of German language. After returning to Albania he joined the faculty of the National Lyceum of Korçë.

== Politics ==
After the Italian invasion of Albania protests were held in many parts of Albania. Selman Riza was arrested by the Italian authorities in the protest of Korçë held in the national day of Albania, on 28 November 1939. The documents of the town's fascist militia describe him as an anti-Italian activist, who disseminated antifascist material among his students. In 1940 Riza was arrested again and transferred to the Santo Stefano internment camp. In October 1941 he was released and moved to Durrës and in July 1942 to Kosovo, where he founded the Irredentist Antifascist Movement, an anti-nazi and anticommunist organization. The manifesto of the organization was published in Tiranë in December 1943. In 1945 he returned to the city, but was arrested one day later by the Communist regime. Yugoslav authorities asked for his extradition, which was initially accepted but later the decision was overturned after the intervention of the minister of justice Manol Konomi. In 1948 a new extradition request was accepted and he was moved to Yugoslav prisons. Riza was released in 1951, because he was heavily afflicted by scurvy.

== Later life ==
After his release he co-founded the Albanological Institute of Pristina along with Ilhami Nimani, Mehdi Bardhi, and Ali Rexha. In 1955 he returned to Albania and worked at the Institute of Linguistics and Literature in Tirana and the faculty of philology of the University of Tirana. In April 1967 he was again put to trial and as a result his writing and publishing rights were revoked. After being transferred to Berat his right to borrow books from the library was revoked too. Selman Riza died in 1988, while most of his works were published post-mortem. In 2005 Ibrahim Rugova, President of Kosovo, posthumously awarded him with the Golden Medal of the League of Prizren and in 2009 Fatmir Sejdiu, his successor awarded Riza with the Golden Medal of Freedom.

== Works ==
In 1944 his commentary work on Albanological studies, titled Tri Monografina Albanologjike, was published in Tiranë. His works' main subjects include variants of the Albanian language used in early Albanian literature, especially with Gjon Buzuku's Meshari. His 1952 study on the Serbo-Croatian grammar is regarded as a work of contrastive analysis, although that theory was not formulated until five years later by Robert Lado.
