= Aleksandra Mano =

Albanian archaeologist

Aleksandra Mano (22 April 1924 – 10 August 2005) was an Albanian archaeologist. She made significant contributions to the study of Illyrian archaeology.

== Biography ==
Aleksandra Mano was born on 22 April 1924, in Postenan, Leskovik, Albania. After completing her primary and secondary education, she began her university studies in Tirana.

In 1955, having finished her studies at the Historical-Geographical Faculty of the University of Tirana, she embarked on a scientific career in the field of archeology at the Academy of Sciences of Albania, specializing primarily in the knowledge of ancient ceramics.

Throughout her career, Aleksandra Mano directed excavations in several cities in Albania, including Apollonia, Vlora, Durrës, Dimal, Oricum, and Lushnje, contributing significantly to uncovering the rich history and culture of Illyria.

In 1975, she was appointed as the director of the Archaeology Sector at the Institute of Historical Studies in Albania. The following year, in 1976, she became the first director of the Center for Archaeological Studies, (Academy of Albanological Studies) a role she held until her retirement.

One of her most well-known contributions lies in the field of Illyrian ceramics, where, through her research, she meticulously documented and categorized various types of Illyrian pottery, significantly contributing to the understanding of Illyrian chronology and development. She was a founding member of the Albanian Archaeological Society and served as the editor of its journal, "Iliria," for many years.

Aleksandra Mano died on 10 August 2005 in Tirana.

== Selected publications ==
- Mano, Aleksandra (1976). "Les rapports commerciaux d'Apollonie avec l'arrière-pays illyrien". Iliria. 4 (1): 307–316. doi:10.3406/iliri.1976.1191.
- Mano, Aleksandra (1983). "Problemi della colonizzazione ellenica nell'Illiria meridionale". Publications de l'École Française de Rome. 67 (1): 227–238.
- Mano, Aleksandra (1998). "Evoluimi i mendimit arkeologjik shqiptar për kolonizimin helen në Ilirinë e Jugut / The Evolution of the Albanian Archaeological Thinking about the Hellenic Colonization of Southern Illyria". Iliria. 28 (1): 129–137. doi:10.3406/iliri.1998.1693.<
- Mano, Aleksandra (1999). "Teatri Antik i Apolonisë / The Ancient Theatre of Apolonia". Iliria. 29 (1): 183–210. doi:10.3406/iliri.1999.1712.
- Mano, Aleksandra (2003). "Apolonia nëpër analet e historisë / Apollonia dans les annales de l'histoire". Iliria. 31 (1): 149–162. doi:10.3406/iliri.2003.1049.
- Apollonia e Ilirisë (2006) OCLC 84153031
