= Marenglen Verli =

Albanian historian and scholar

Marenglen Verli (born 19 December 1951) is an Albanian historian and scholar. Since 2009, he is a member of the Academy of Sciences of Albania.

== Life ==
Verli was born in Tirana on 19 December 1951. After finishing the high school "Petro Nini Luarasi", he entered the Faculty of History-Philology of the University of Tirana, History-Geography branch. During 1973–79 he worked as teacher in the town of Laç. In 1979 he started in the Institute of History in Tirana (Albanian: Instituti i Historisë), holding the position of the "scientific personnel" until 2013. In 1985 he revived the title "Kandidat i shkencave historike" (Candidate of history sciences), and "Doktor i Shkencave" (Doctor of Sciences) in 1994, in 1997 "Associated Professor", and in 2001 "Professor". From 2005–2008 he served also as director of the Institute of History, and editor-in-chief of the Studime historike periodical. With the establishment of the Centre of Albanological Studies (CAS) in 2008, Verli started as departmental director of the Institute of History, now part of CAS, and member of the CAS Academic Senate. Since 2009, he is an Associated Academic (Albanian: Akademik i asociuar) of the Academy of Science of Albania.
For over 30 years, he has been a lecturer of the University of Tirana (Faculty of History-Philology, and Faculty of Social Sciences), Doctorate Center of CAS, and Aleksandër Xhuvani University in Elbasan. As an author and co-author, he lists many publications, profiled in the history of the Albanians within former Yugoslavia areas.

== Publications ==
As of 2015:

- Fjalor enciklopedik shqiptar (Encyclopedic Albanian Dictionary), as co-author, Academy of Sciences, Tirana: 1985. OCLC 15296028.
- E vërteta mbi Kosovën dhe shqiptarët në Jugosllavi (Truth on Kosovo and Albanians in Yugoslavia), Academy of Sciences, Tirana: 1992. OCLC 31243172.
- Reforma agrare kolonizuese në Kosovë (1918–1941) (The colonizing agrarian reform in Kosovo [1918–1941]), Tirana: Akademia e Shkencave e Republikës së Shqiperisë Instituti i Historisë; Bonn: Iliria, OCLC 760927766.
- Shfrytëzimi ekonomik i Kosovës në vitet ‘70-‘90 (Economic exploitation of Kosovo during '70–'90s), Tirana: Shtëpia Botuese "Dituria", 1994. OCLC 39216954.
- Plava e Gucia në Lëvizjen Kombëtare Shqiptare (1876–1919) (Plav and Gusinje in the Albanian national movement [1876–1919]), Elmaz B. Plava, M.Verli as editor and arranger, Tirana: Shtëpia Botuese "Marin Barleti", 1995. OCLC 37228348.
- Ballafaqime politike në Shqipëri (1898–1942) (Political confrontations in Albania [1898–1942]), Sejfi Vllamasi, M.Versli as editor, Tirana: Shtëpia Botuese "Marin Barleti", 1995. OCLC 37228559.
- Çështja e Kosovës një problem historik dhe aktual (Kosovo question, a historical and current problem), as co-author, Tirana: Eurorilindja, 1996.
- Kujtime të Tafil Boletinit: "Përballë sfidave të kohës" (Memoirs of Tafil Boletini: "In front of the challenges over time"), Tirana: Botimpex, 1996; 2003. ISBN 9789992782347.
- Kujtime të Tafil Boletinit: "Pranë Isa Boletinit" (Memoirs of Tafil Boletini: "Close to Isa Boletini"), Tetovo : Ndërmarrja Gazetare-Botuese Album, 1996. OCLC 38841879.
- Kosova në vështrim enciklopedik (Kosovo in an encyclopedic view), as co-author, Tiranea: Botimet Toena, 1999. ISBN 9789992711705.
- Ekonomia e Kosovës në vargonjtë e politikës jugosllave (1945–1990) (Economy of Kosovo chained by the Yugoslav politics [1945–1990)], Tirana: Shtëpia Botuese "Mësonjëtorja e parë", 2000. OCLC 49001814.
- Kosova në fokusin e historisë (Kosovo in the focus of history), vol.I, Tirana: Botimpex, 2002. ISBN 9789992782316.
- Kosova në fokusin e historisë (Kosovo in the focus of history), vol.II, Tirana: Botimpex, 2003. ISBN 9789992782316.
- Komiteti "Mbrojtja Kombëtare e Kosovës", ("National Defence of Kosovo" Committee), Tirana: Akad. e Shkencave, 2004. ISBN 9789994365302.
- Nga Kosova për Kosovën. Profile biografike (From Kosovo to Kosovo. Biographical profiles), Tirana: Botimpex, 2006. ISBN 9789994380114.
- Pavarësia e Shqipërisë dhe sfidat e shtetit shqiptar gjatë shek. XX (Independence of Albania and the challenges of the Albanian state during XX century), Tirana: Instituti i Historisë Universiteti i Tiranës, 2008. ISBN 9789995664817.
- Lef Nosi – Dokumente Historike 1912–1918 (Lef Nosi – Historical documents 1912–1928), as editor, Tirana: Instituti i Historisë, 2007. ISBN 9789995610043.
- Shqipëria dhe Kosova – historia e një aspirate (Albania and Kosovo – story of an aspiration), vol. I-II, Tirana: Botimpex, 2007. ISBN 9789994380145.
- Fjalori enciklopedik shqiptar (Albanian Encyclopedic Dictionary), vol. I-II, as co-author and editor, Tirana: Academy of Sciences, 2007.
- Historia e Popullit Shqiptar / Monografi kolektive (History of the Albanian people / collective monograph), as co-author, vol.III, Tirana: Instituti i Historisë, 2007.
- Kosova – sfida shqiptare në historinë e një shekulli (Kosovo – the Albanian challenge in the history of a century), Tirana: Botimpex, 2007. ISBN 9789994380138.
- Lidhja Shqiptare e Prizrenit në dokumentet austro-hungareze (Albanian League of Prizren from the Austro-Hungarian documents), as editor, Tirana: Albanica, 2008. ISBN 9789951873529.
- Historia e Shqipërisë e viteve 1912–1964 në Kujtimet e Spiro Kosovës (History of Albania 1912–1964 in the memoirs of Spiro Kosova), vol.I as editor; vol.III as co-author and editor, Tirana: Klean, 2008. ISBN 9789995664855.
- Historia e Popullit Shqiptar / Monografi kolektive (History of the Albanian people / collective monograph), as co-author, vol.IV, Tirana: Instituti i Historisë, 2008.
- Fjalori enciklopedik shqiptar (Albanian Encyclopedic Dictionary), vol. I-II, as co-author and editor, Tirana: Academy of Sciences, 2008.
- Monarkia shqiptare (1928–1939) / Vëllim me studime (Albanian monarchy (1928–1939) / Volume of studies), as co-author and editor, Tirana: Botimet Toena, 2011. ISBN 9789994317219.
- Dokumente britanike për çështjen shqiptare në Konferencën e Ambasadorëve në Londër 1912–1913 (British documents for the Albanian cause from the Conference of the Ambassadors in London 1912–1913), as co-editor, Tirana: Botimet "Toena", 2012. ISBN 9789994318032.
- Dokumente franceze për Shqipërinë dhe shqiptarët më 1912 (French documents on Albania and Albanians in 1912), as editor, Tirana: Botimet "Toena", 2012. ISBN 9789994317981.
- Franc Nopça, Fiset e Malësisë së Shqipërisë Veriore dhe e drejta zakonore e tyre (Franz Nopcsa, The northern Albania highland tribes and their customary law), as co-editor, Tirana: Shtepia botuese "Eneas", 2013. ISBN 9789928110350.
- Franc Nopça, Pikëpamjet fetare, doket dhe zakonet e Malcisë së Madhe (Franz Nopcsa, Religious views, customs, and traditions of the Grand Highland), as co-editor, Tirana: Centre of Albanlogical Studies, 2012. ISBN 9789928110299.
- Shqipëria në dokumentet austro-hungareze (Albania through Austro-Hungarian documents), as co-author and editor, vol.VI, Tirana: Centre of Albanological Studies, 2012. OCLC 842993501.
- Syrja Vlora. Kujtime – Nga fundi i sundimit osman në Luftën e Vlorës (Syrja Vlora. Memoirs – from the late Ottoman rule to the Vlora War), as co-editor, Tirana: "Iceberg" Publishing House, 2013. ISBN 9789928414045.
- Shqipëria në dokumentet austro-hungareze (Albania through Austro-Hungarian documents), as co-author and editor, vol.VII, Tirana: Centre of Albanological Studies, 2014. OCLC 842993501.
- Shqiptarët gjatë Luftës së Dytë Botërore / Vëllim me studime (Albanians during WWII / Volume of studies), as co-author and editor, Prishtina: Instituti i Historise "Ali Hadri", Tirana: Instituti i Historisë, 2014. OCLC 907948318.
- Shqiptarët në optikën e diplomacisë austro-hungareze 1878–1918 (Albanians through the optics of the Austro-Hungarian diplomacy), Tirana: Klean, 2014. ISBN 9789928420930.
- Aspekte rreth krijimit dhe zgjidhjes së çështjes shqiptare (Aspects of the creation and resolution of the Albanian cause), vol.I, Tirana: Klean, 2014. ISBN 9789928420978.
- Shqipëria në Konferencën e Paqes 1919–1920 (Albania at the Peace Conference 1919–1920), 2015.
