= Gjuha Jonë =

Magazine est. 1981 in Tirana, Albania

- Frequency: Quarterly
- Publisher: Albanian Institute of Linguistics and Literature
- Founded: 1981
- Country: Albania
- Based in: Tirana
- Language: Albanian
- ISSN: 1728-4813
- OCLC: 13078072

Gjuha Jonë (Our Language) is a magazine published in Tirana, Albania, focusing on the standard and literary Albanian language. It is published by the Centre of Albanological Studies. Its main functions consist of enlarging the functionality of the standard Albanian language and elevation of its social prestige, the educational system and staff, strategies on augmentation of press organs and publishing media, and increase of the researchers in the linguistics field.

The magazine was first proposed in February 1979 by Eqrem Çabej during the work sessions of the Academy of Sciences in Tirana. It was followed by a legal act (act-decision) of the Albanian Council of Ministers, demanding permanent and extensive research on the standard and literary language; one of the topics mentioned was the creation of a scientific magazine on that purpose. The magazine started in 1981, published by the Academy of Sciences of Albania. A homologue one started in 1982 in Pristina, Kosovo, named Gjuha Shqipe (Albanian Language), targeting the same topics. It was published by the Albanological Institute of Pristina.
In 2008, the Institute of Linguistics and Literature (Albanian: Instituti i Gjuhës dhe Letërsisë) split with the Albanian Academy of Sciences and joined the Centre of Albanological Studies, carried over the magazine as well.
Gjuha Jonë is published quarterly.

== See also ==
- Studime Historike
- Studime Filologjike
- Kultura Popullore
- Gjuha Shqipe
