= More Light =

More Light may refer to:

- More Light Presbyterians, an American religious movement
- More Light (J Mascis + The Fog album), 2000
- More Light (Primal Scream album), 2013

== See also ==
- "Mehr Licht!" (German, 'More light!'), the supposed last words of Johann Wolfgang von Goethe
  - Mehr Licht!, an Albanian literary and cultural magazine
