= Besim Bokshi =

Albanian poet (1930–2014)

- Born: November 12, 1930; Gjakova, Kingdom of Yugoslavia
- Died: August 16, 2014 (aged 83)
- Occupation(s): Pedagogue, scholar
- Known for: President of the Academy of Arts and Sciences of Kosovo

Besim Bokshi (12 November 1930 – 16 August 2014) was an Albanian poet, linguist and philologist. He served as the president of the Academy of Sciences and Arts of Kosovo during 2008-2011.

== Career ==
Besim Bokshi was born in Gjakova, Kingdom of Yugoslavia. His family moved to Albania when he was a child and he finished elementary education in a school in Dukat, a village near Vlorë. A few years later he studied in Tirana.

In 1945, he returned to Gjakova and studied at the Catedra of Albanology of the University of Belgrade until 1959, followed by post-graduate studies on linguistics still in Belgrade. During 1961-63, he taught Albanian language in the Gjakova High School, being also its director. From 1967 to 1973, he lectured morphology at the High Pedagogical School in Gjakova, being also its director during 1967-71. During this time, he worked for the Albanological Institute of Pristina for a period of eight months. From 1974, he lectured the "Historical morphology" course in the Albanian Language and Literature branch of the Philological Faculty of the University of Pristina. In 1977 he finished his doctorate in philology in the University of Pristina. He was a member and president of the Academy of Sciences and Arts of Kosovo, while in the past he has served as its vice-president.

Bokshi was a member of the Conclusions Commission during the Linguistic Consult of Pristina in 1968, a linguistics event on the topic of the orthography standard of the Albanian language. He was also a delegate in the Orthography Congress held in Tirana in November 1973, and in the Southeastern European Studies Congress held in Ankara, Turkey in 1978.

Bokshi died on 16 August 2014.

== Works ==
=== Poetry ===
- In Expectation (Në Pritje), Pristina, 1966
- Broken Shadows (Hije të këputura), Peć, 1996

=== Linguistics ===
- Development of the Formation of the Present Nominal Flexion of Albanian (Rruga e formimit të sotëm nominal të shqipes), Pristina, 1980
- Postposition of the article in Balkan languages (Prapavendosja e nyjes në gjuhët ballkanike), Pristina, 1984
- The Participle in Albanian: A Diachronic View (Pjesorja e shqipes: vështrim diakronik), Pristina, 1998
- On Personal Pronouns in Albanian (Për vetorët e shqipes), Pristina, 2004.
