= Illyria =

- Historical region
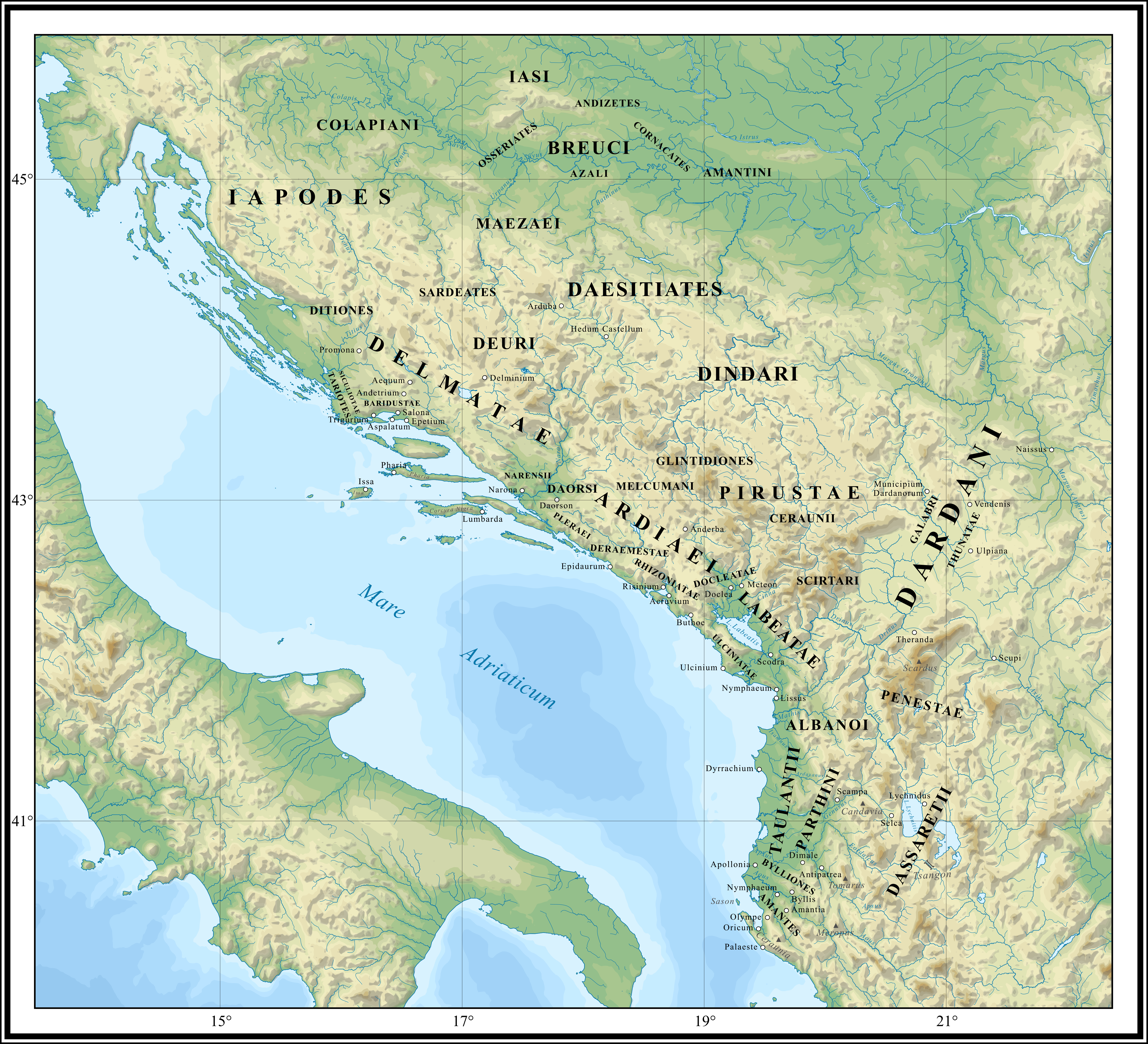
- Approximate area settled by Illyrian tribes during classical antiquity
- Area: Southeast Europe
- Region: Western Balkan

In classical and late antiquity, Illyria (/ɪ.ˈlɪər.i.ə/, ih-LEER-ee-ə; Ancient Greek: Ἰλλυρία, Illyría or Ἰλλυρίς, Illyrís; Latin: Illyria, Illyricum) was a region in the western part of the Balkan Peninsula inhabited by numerous tribes of people collectively known as the Illyrians.

The Ancient Greeks initially used the term Illyris to define approximately the area of northern and central present-day Albania down to the Aoös valley (modern Vjosa) and the Bay of Vlorë, including in most periods much of the lakeland area (Ohrid and Prespa). It corresponded to the region that neighboured Macedonia and Epirus. In Roman times the terms Illyria, Illyris, or Illyricum were extended from the territory that was roughly located in the area of the south-eastern Adriatic coast (modern Albania and Montenegro) and its hinterland (entire modern Bosnia and Herzegovina, Western Serbia), to a broader region stretching between the whole eastern Adriatic and the Danube.

From about mid-1st century BC the term Illyricum was used by the Romans for the province of the Empire that stretched along the eastern Adriatic coast north of the Drin river, south of which the Roman province of Macedonia began including the southern part of the traditional region of Illyria. The southeastern part, to the north of Macedonia, was organized within the province of Moesia Superior. From about 69-79 AD the province of Illyricum was subsumed into the provinces of Dalmatia and Pannonia. In the Late Roman Empire the name was used for the praetorian prefecture of Illyricum.

== Name ==
The region took its name from its inhabitants, the Illyrians, a group of Balkan Indo-European speaking peoples that inhabited the western part of the Peninsula in ancient times.

== Illyrian kingdoms ==
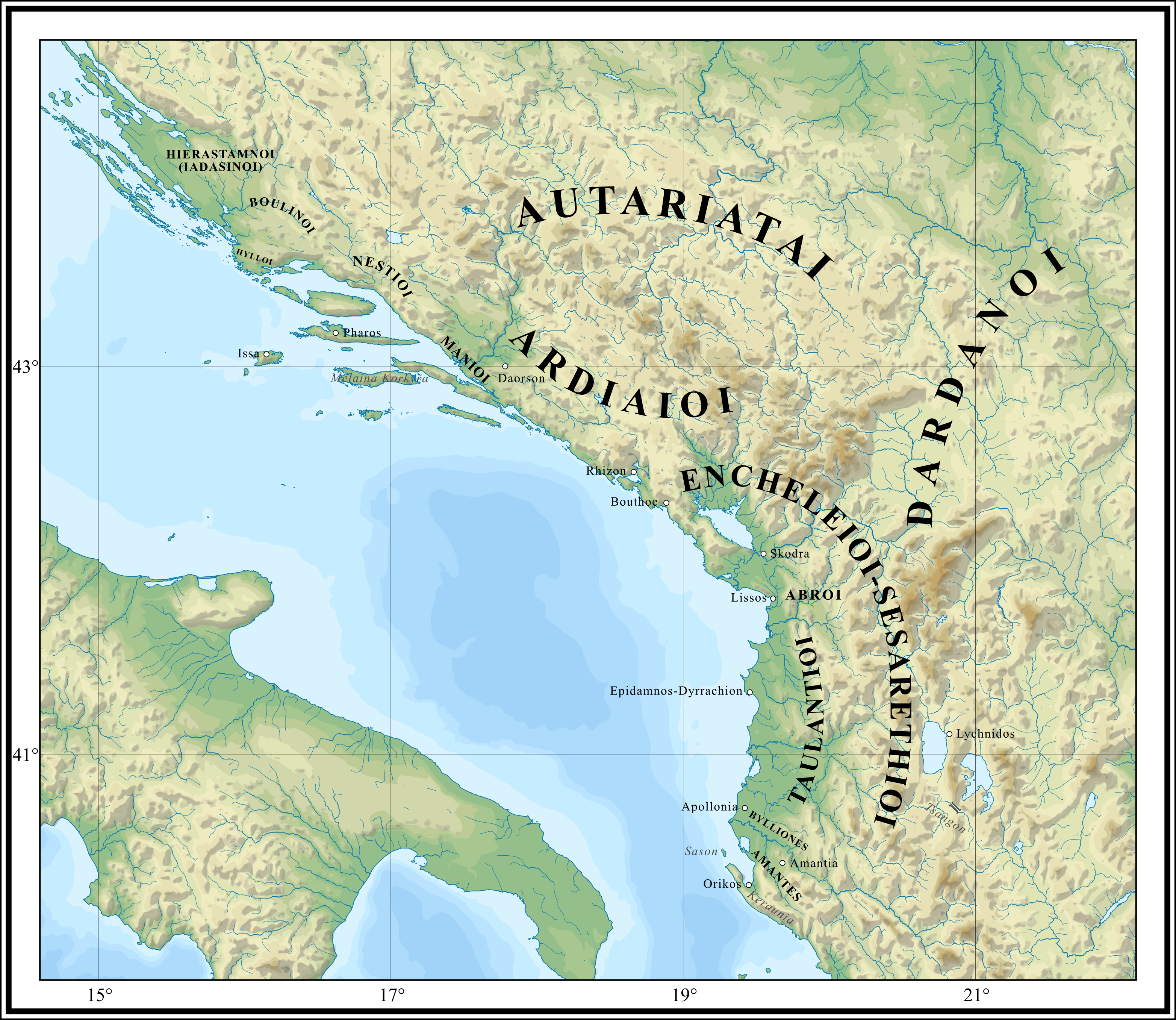
Illyrian tribes in the 7th–4th centuries BCE

The earliest recorded Illyrian kingdom was that of the Enchele in the 8th century BC. The era in which we observe other Illyrian kingdoms begins approximately at 400 BC and ends at 167 BC. The Autariatae under Pleurias (337 BC) were considered to have been a kingdom. The Kingdom of the Ardiaei began at 230 BC and ended at 167 BC. The most notable Illyrian kingdoms and dynasties were those of Bardyllis of the Dardani and of Agron of the Ardiaei who created the last and best-known Illyrian kingdom. Agron ruled over the Ardiaei and had extended his rule to other tribes as well. As for the Dardanians, they always had separate domains from the rest of the Illyrians.

The Illyrian kingdoms were composed of small areas within the region of Illyria. Only the Romans ruled the entire region. The internal organization of the south Illyrian kingdoms points to imitation of their neighbouring Greek kingdoms and influence from the Greek and Hellenistic world in the growth of their urban centres. Polybius gives as an image of society within an Illyrian kingdom as peasant infantry fought under aristocrats which he calls in Greek Polydynastae (Greek: Πολυδυνάστες) where each one controlled a town within the kingdom. The monarchy was established on hereditary lines and Illyrian rulers used marriages as a means of alliance with other powers. Pliny (23–79 AD) writes that the people that formed the nucleus of the Illyrian kingdom were 'Illyrians proper' or Illyrii proprie dicti. They were the Taulantii, the Pleraei, the Endirudini, Sasaei, Grabaei and the Labeatae. These later joined to form the Docleatae.

== Roman Protectorate of Illyricum ==
After the Roman victory in the First Illyrian War, Illyrian Queen Teuta was forced to retreat to the Bay of Kotor, and in 228 BC the Romans imposed a protectorate on the islands of Issa and Corcyra, as well as on the cities of Epidamnos, Apollonia and Oricum. The protectorate area corresponded to the usage of the Roman concept of Illyricum.

During the Macedonian Wars, the territory of southern Illyria, which Rome had aimed to protect and control periodically for thirty years since the First Illyrian War, was involved in the conflict between Rome and Macedon. Macedon aimed to conquer, without success, the southern Illyrian ports because they would have been good bases for an attack upon the Italian Peninsula.

The Romans defeated Gentius, the last king of Illyria, at Scodra (in present-day Albania) in 168 BC and captured him, bringing him to Rome in 165 BC. Four client-republics were set up, which were in fact ruled by Rome. Later, the region was directly governed by Rome and organized as a province, with Scodra as its capital.

== Roman rule ==
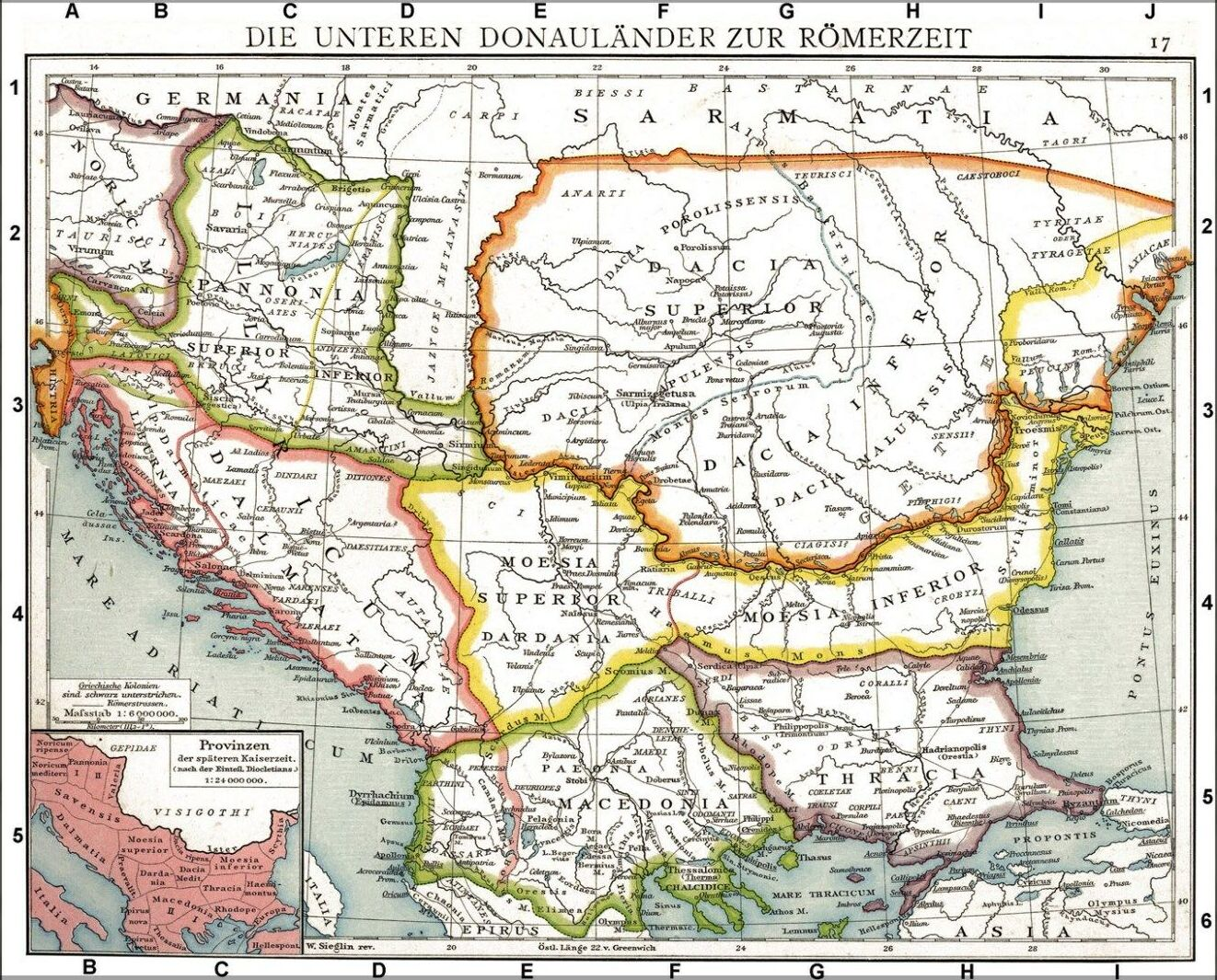
Map of the Roman administrative divisions in Southeast Europe

Illyrian territories were organized during the Roman administration into the provinces of Illyricum, Macedonia, and Moesia Superior.

The Roman province of Illyricum roughly encompassed the territories of the last Illyrian kingdom. It stretched from the Drilon river in modern Albania to Istria (Croatia) in the west and to the Sava river (Bosnia and Herzegovina) in the north. Salona (near modern Split in Croatia) functioned as its capital.

After subduing a troublesome revolt of Pannonians and Daesitiates, Roman administrators dissolved the province of Illyricum and divided its lands between the new provinces of Pannonia in the north and Dalmatia in the south. Although this division occurred in 10 AD, the term Illyria remained in use in Late Latin and throughout the medieval period. After the division of the Roman Empire, the bishops of Thessalonica appointed papal vicars for Illyricum. The first of these vicars is said to have been Bishop Acholius or Ascholius (died 383 or 384), the friend of St. Basil. In the 5th century, the bishops of Illyria withdrew from communion with Rome, without attaching themselves to Constantinople, and remained for a time independent, but in 515, forty Illyrian bishops renewed their loyalty to Rome by declaring allegiance to Pope Hormisdas. The patriarchs of Constantinople succeeded in bringing Illyria under their jurisdiction in the 8th century.

Jewish presence in Illyricum is attested during and after its incorporation into the Roman Empire. As Roman military and trade networks expanded into the region following the defeat of King Gentius, Jewish merchants, artisans, and possibly freed slaves settled in Dalmatian and Pannonian cities such as Salona, Narona, and Sirmium. These communities, often Greek-speaking and aligned with Jerusalem-based traditions, operated within Roman legal frameworks and sometimes held status as collegia. Although no literary corpus survives from Illyrian Jews, archaeological evidence, including menorahs and inscriptions, supports their presence. Some scholars suggest that these Jews formed part of broader Hellenistic Judaism diaspora patterns reaching as far as Tanais in the Crimea and Stobi in Macedonia.

== See also ==
- Illyrian Tribes
- List of ancient tribes in Illyria
- Illyrian language
- Proposed Illyrian vocabulary
- List of rulers of Illyria
- Illyrian warfare
- Timeline of Illyrian history
