= Gjon Buzuku =

Albanian priest and writer (1499–1577)

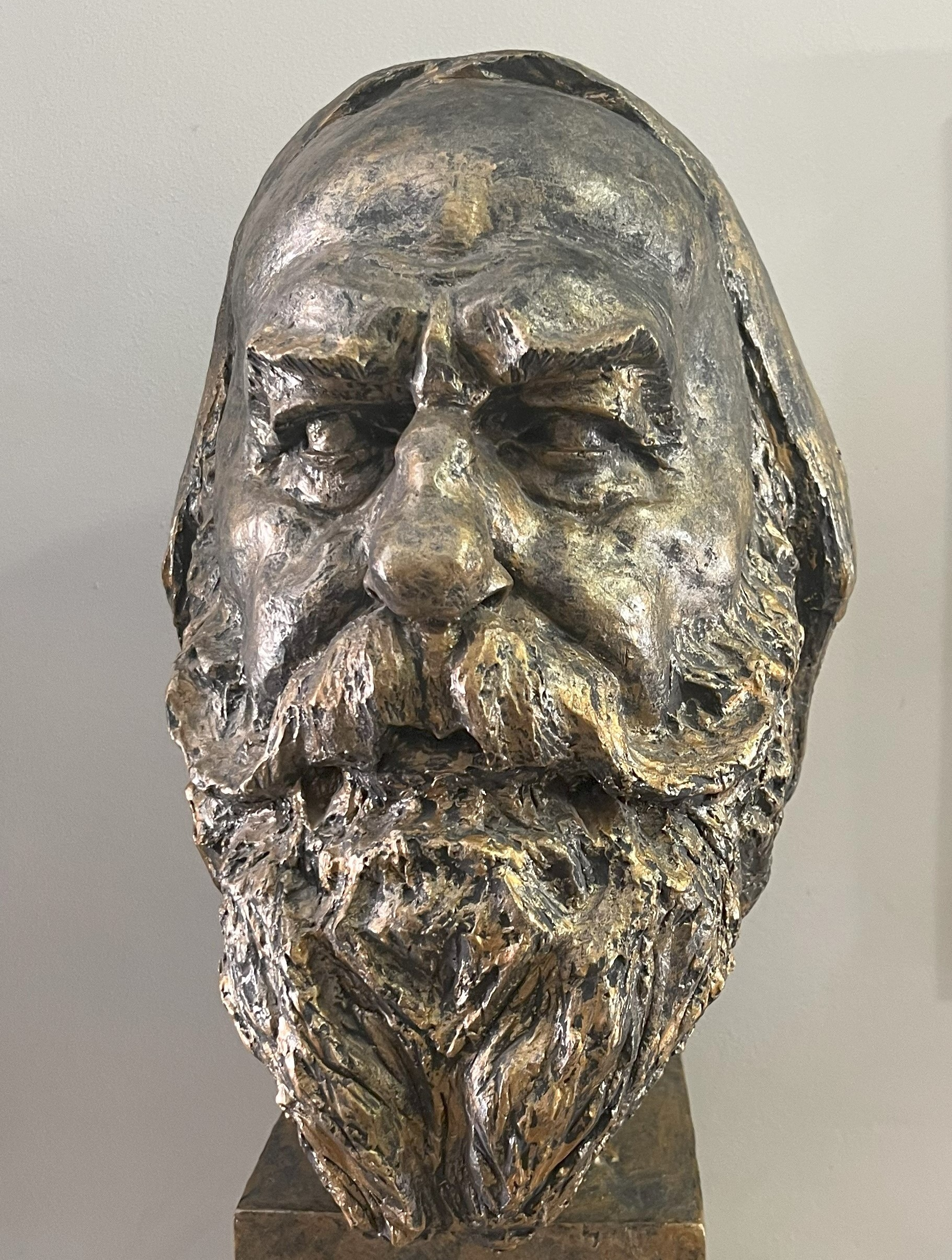
- Born: 1499
- Died: 1577 (aged 77–78)
- Occupation: Catholic priest
- Notable work: Meshari
- Father: Bdek (Benedict) Buzuku
- Family: Buzuku

Gjon Buzuku (c. 1499 – c. 1577) was an Albanian Catholic priest and a prominent Old Albanian author from the Renaissance, who wrote the first known printed book in Albanian. Commonly referred to as the Missal, this book is considered an important monument of Albanian studies, being the oldest source for studying the Albanian language.

== Life ==
Very little that is known about Gjon Buzuku comes from the last page of his book, where he mentions being the son of a certain Bdek (Benedict) Buzuku. It is thought that he was from the region of Shestan - Kraje, where he was also a priest in the church of Saint Dimitri (Shen Mitri) in the village of Brisk, where it is said that he also had a house near the church. The version of gheg dialect that the missal is written in confirms this fact as in the village of Brisk this dialect is spoken to this day.

From March 20, 1554, to January 5, 1555, he wrote a translation of the Catholic missal into the Gheg dialect of Albanian. He published it as a book of 220 pages. The Apostolic Library in the Vatican holds the only known copy of the book. It is missing the frontispiece and the first 16 sheets, which explains why the title and year of publication of the work are not known. Buzuku gives a few clues on his motives in the short text at the end,

I, John, son of Benedict Buzuku, having often considered that our language had in it nothing intelligible from the Holy Scriptures, wished for the sake of our people to attempt, as far as I was able, to enlighten the minds of those who understand, so that they may comprehend how great and powerful and forgiving our Lord is to those who love him with all their hearts. I beg of you from today on to go to church more often to hear the word of God.

Based from the Albanian dialect used, it is obvious that Buzuku came from a Gheg area of Albanian milieu. Sometimes this is defined further to be in the village of Brisk Posht in Shestan near Krajë region, close to Northern Albania (Krajë is located on the shores of Shkodra Lake), then Ottoman Empire. Not much else is known about Buzuku. His presence is not recorded in any of the archival documents of the time. It remains to be seen if a recent discovery from the archives of Padua might add a few more details. A certain Gjon Buzuku is recorded there at the University of Padua finishing his doctoral studies in 1567.

== The first Albanian book ==
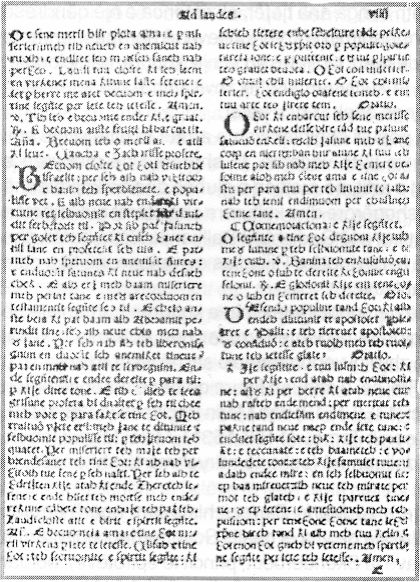
A page from the Meshari.

Considered to be the oldest published book in Albanian, Meshari was discovered in 1740 by Gjon Nikollë Kazazi, the archbishop of Skopje. In other libraries there are three photocopies from the original, one of them in Tirana. In 1996, the librarians were not able to locate the book, which had been used in 1984 for the last time. Eqrem Çabej wrote a monograph on the book in 1968. The dialect used in Meshari was one of the main subjects of Selman Riza's works.

The place the book was printed is thought to be either Venice or Shkodër. Though recent studies by Lucia Nadin give convincing evidence that make Venice as the place where Meshari was printed. According to Nadin, it was at the workshop of Bernardino Bindoni that this might have happened. Another hypothesis is that it was printed at the workshop of the Scotto family in Venice.

The book contains the liturgies of the main holidays. There are also texts of prayers and rituals and catechetical texts. Every page contains two columns. The initials are decorated. The grammar and the vocabulary are more archaic than in the Gheg text from the 17th century. The text is very valuable from the viewpoint of the history of language. The vocabulary is quite rich. The archaic text is easily read due to the circumstance that it is mainly a translation of known texts, in particular the Bible. Most of the Gospels of Matthew, Luke and John were translated in the book. It also contains passages from the Psalms, the Book of Isaiah, the Book of Jeremiah, the Letters to the Corinthians, and many illustrations.

The orthography is peculiar. The Latin alphabet with some additional letters is used. The consequent character of orthography and grammar seems to indicate an earlier tradition of writing.

In Albanian, the book is known as Meshari (The Missal). All we know about the author is from the book's colophon written by Buzuku himself in Albanian. The language used is a pre-runner to the official Gheg dialect of Albanian. However, it is clear that the Gheg dialect was used. Even today one can hear words and expressions from older Malësians that sound as if jumping from the pages of the missal.
