= Mahir Domi =

Albanian linguist, professor, and academic

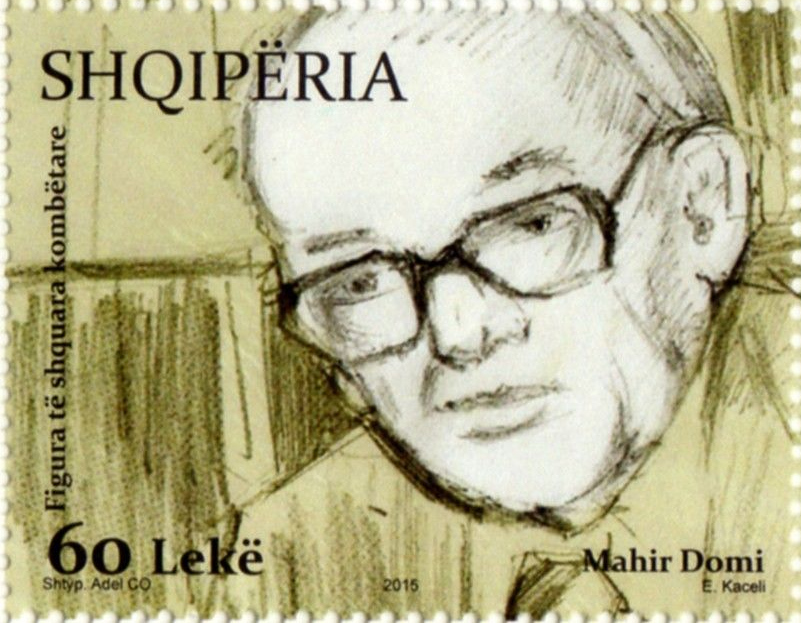
- Mahir Domi on a 2015 stamp of Albania
- Born: March 12, 1915; Elbasan, Albania
- Died: October 19, 2000 (aged 85); Tirana, Albania
- Occupations: Linguist, academic

Mahir Domi (1915–2000) was an Albanian linguist, professor, and academic. He was one of the organizers and main participants of the Albanian Orthography Congress, and member of the follow-up commission responsible for deploying the orthographic rules of the Standard Albanian language.

== Biography ==
Domi was born in Elbasan, Albania on 12 March,1915. He started his high school studies in the Norman School there, and finished them in the French Lyceum of Korçë in 1937. After that he registered in the University of Grenoble in France, from where he graduated in classic philology in 1941. The same year he started teaching at the Normal School of Elbasan, and later he became its director. From 1947, he started working in the Institute of Sciences (an early precursor of the Albanian Academy of Sciences) and lecturer at the High Pedagogical Institute in Tirana. Domi participated as co-editor in the Albanian language dictionary (Albanian: Fjalori i gjuhës shqipe) in 1954. With the establishment of the University of Tirana (UT), he was put in charge of the Albanian language catedra (1957–1962), and also of the grammar and dialectology section of the Institute of Language and Literature (Albanian: Instituti i Gjuhësisë dhe i Letërsisë) during 1957–1991. He taught the courses "Syntax of the Albanian language", "Historical morphology of the Albanian language", and "History of Albanology". He was one of the founding members of the Academy of Sciences and member of its presidium.

Domi's scientific activity covers many of fields of philology: grammar (syntax and morphology), language history, history of Albanology, dialectology and onomastics, normative linguistics, language culture, scientific critics, history of literature, etc. He directed the work for establishing the cartotheque of grammar and the important work Gramatika e gjuhës shqipe (The grammar of the Albanian language), in two volumes; he was its chief editor, and co-author and editor of its second volume (Syntax). He drafted out the academic textbooks Morfologjia historike e shqipes (Historical morphology of the Albanian language) of 1961, Sintaksa e gjuhës shqipe (Syntax of the Albanian language), part I in 1968 and part II in 1969. He also contributed with a series of scientific articles and researches over general topics of the Albanian syntax and its structural development. In the field of the history of literature, Domi wrote articles and researches over the origins of the Albanian language, its connection to other Balkan languages, especially with Romanian, i.e. Prapashtesa ilire dhe shqipe, përkime dhe paralelizma (Illyrian and Albanian prefixes, correspondences, and parallelisms) of 1974, Konsiderata mbi tiparet e përbashkëta të shqipes me gjuhët ballkanike dhe mbi studimin e tyre (Considerations over the shared features of the Albanian language with other Balkan languages and their study) of 1975, Mbi disa përkime dhe paralelizma sintaksore shqipe-rumune (Over some Albanian-Romanian correspondences and parallelisms) of 1977, Probleme të historisë së formimit të gjuhës shqipe, arritje dhe detyra (Problems of the history of the Albanian language formation, achievements and tasks) of 1982.

As one of the main personalities in linguistics, Domi was member of the commissions who carries the task of standardizing the Albanian orthography, in 1956 and 1967, co-organizer and participant of the Orthography Congress of November 1972, member of the follow-up commission for deploying the new orthographic rules and co-author of the Drejtshkrimi i gjuhës shqipe (Orthography of the Albanian language) of 1973, Fjalori drejtshkrimor (Orthographic dictionary) of 1976, Rregullat e pikësimit në gjuhën shqipe (Punctuation rules in the Albanian language) of 1981 (another edition in 2002).

Domi participated in many commissions which would draft out dictionaries of terminologies from various fields, between others Fjalori i termave të gjuhësisë (Dictionary of the linguistics's terms) of 1975. He was the organizer and main co-contributor to the work that resulted in the publishing of the Atlasi dialektologjik i gjuhës shqipe (Dialectical atlas of the Albanian language), Dialektologjia shqiptare (Albanian dialectics), both works of major importance. He was also initiator of the collection of the onomastic material, co-author of the questionnaire for the collection of toponymy, and articles on them.

Domi also studied also the old Albanian literature written in Arabic alphabet, and contributed to the literature section in the major work Historia e letërsisë shqipe (History of Albanian Literature), vol. I of 1959, published by the University of Tirana, and served as editor for the second volume of 1983 published by the Academy of Sciences of Albania. As a recensé, Domi contributed in the evolvement of the scientific critics culture in Albania.

== Recognition ==
- "Mësues i Popullit" (People's Teacher).
- "Çmimi i Republikës i shkallës së parë" (First Grade Republic's Prize), twice.

== See also ==
- Shaban Demiraj
- Androkli Kostallari
- Eqrem Çabej
- Idriz Ajeti
