= Instituti i Studimit të Krimeve dhe Pasojave të Komunizmit =

Independent public research institution in Albania

Instituti i Studimit për Krimet dhe Pasojat e Komunizmit (ISKK)
- Established: February 25, 2010
- Focus: Research, documentation, and public education on the crimes and consequences of the communist regime in Albania (1944–1991)
- Key people: Agron Tufa (founding director, 2010–2019); Çelo Hoxha
- Owner: Albanian state (publicly funded)
- Location: Tirana, Albania
- Website: iskk.gov.al

The Institute for the Study of the Crimes and Consequences of Communism (Albanian: Instituti i Studimit për Krimet dhe Pasojat e Komunizmit) also known as Instituti i Studimit të Krimeve të Komunizmit, (ISKK) is and independent public institution in Albania, established by the Albanian parliament through Law Nr. 10242 on February 25, 2010. The Institute’s role is to collect and analyze documents and facts about the communist period in Albania. It is funded by the government budget and other sources.

== Objective ==
ISKK is dedicated to researching and objectively evaluating the crimes and damages inflicted during the communist era. Its mission is to uncover and document these realities in a substantiated and indisputable manner. Beyond raising public awareness, the Institute's work has focused on collecting oral and material testimonies from survivors of the communist dictatorship, and in particular on conducting thorough research within official archives.

== Scientific activities and international cooperation ==
In addition to numerous publications, ISKK has organized and collaborated on serveral international scientific conferences addressing the repressive aspects of the communist regime in albania. Some of the activities are:

- 30 August 2017. "National Memorial of Labour Camps", a project commemorating the victims who were persecuted and subjected to punishment in forced labour camps in Albania during the communist dictatorship.
- 30–31 October 2018. "The outcast from the power: the eviction/deportation system and the use of forced labor in Albania 1945-1990".
- 17 May 2019. "The portrait of ‘people’s enemy’ during the dictatorship of proletariat in Albania (1944-1990)".
- 19 February 2020. "Patriots or traitors? Albanian political emigration in 1944-1990".
- 28 August 2020. "95 years of Martin Camaj, work and persecution".

By 2019, ISKK had already published approximately 100 titles on the crimes of communism.

== Administration ==
Since its establishment, ISKK has been led by Agron Tufa (founding director) who served until 2019. Following the 2019 departure of Tufa due to threats and intimidations, the institution was headed by Çelo Hoxha. Since April 2025 the Chairman of the Board of Directors is Mentor Beqa.
