= Meshari =

Book written by Gjon Buzuku, a Catholic cleric in 1555

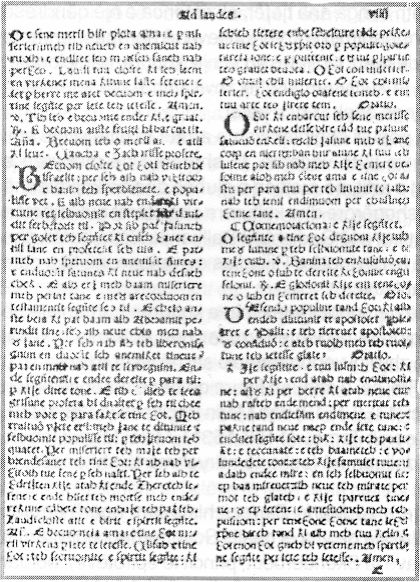
Excerpt from Meshari by Gjon Buzuku.

Meshari (Albanian for "Missal") is the oldest published book in Albanian. The book was written by Gjon Buzuku, a Catholic cleric in 1555. The book contains 188 pages and is written in two columns. Meshari is the translation of the main parts of the Catholic Liturgy into Albanian. It contains the liturgies of the main religious holidays of the year, comments from the book of prayers, excerpts from the Bible as well as excerpts from the ritual and catechism. It was written to help Christians pray daily religious services. The only original known copy of this book currently is in the Library of the Vatican.

Meshari is written in the Gheg Albanian dialect and uses Latin alphabet as well as some letters from medieval Cyrillic and Greek. The book has a rich vocabulary and its orthography and grammatical forms seem to be well established, which is indicative of an earlier tradition in the writing of the Albanian language. The dialect used in Meshari was one of the main subjects of Selman Riza's works.

== Discovery ==
Meshari was discovered in 1740 by Gjon Nikollë Kazazi, then lost and rediscovered in 1909. In 1930, the book was photocopied for the first time by Father Justin Rrota, who brought a copy to Albania. In 1968 it was published with transliterations and comments by linguists.

Below is the first paragraph of the Meshari's epilogue, written by Buzuku:

I, John, son of Benedict Buzuku, having often considered that our language had in it nothing intelligible from the Holy Scriptures, wished for the sake of our people to attempt, as far as I was able, to enlighten the minds of those who understand, so that they may comprehend how great and powerful and forgiving our Lord is to those who love him with all their hearts. I beg of you from today on to go to church more often to hear the word of God. If you do this, may our Lord have mercy upon you. Those who have suffered up to now shall suffer no longer. May you be the elect of our Lord. He will be with you at all times if you pursue righteousness and avoid iniquity. By so doing, the Lord shall give you increase, for your harvest shall last until the vintage and the vintage shall last until the time of sowing. I, moreover, wish to finish my work if it please God. I began it in the year 1554 on the 12th day of August and finished it in the year 1555 on the 12th day of August. If perchance mistakes have been made in any part, I pray and beg of those who are more learned than I to correct them. For I should not be surprised if I have made mistakes, this being the very first work, great and difficult to render into our language. Those who printed it had great difficulty and thus could not fail to make mistakes, for I was not able to be with them all the time. Running a church, I had to serve in two places. And now I beg of you all to pray to the Lord on my behalf.

== See also ==
- History of Albania
- Albanian language
- Albanian literature
