= Gjon Nikollë Kazazi =

Albanian Catholic cleric

His Excellency Gjon Nikollë Kazazi Th.D

Personal details
- Born: 1 January 1702 Gjakova, Ottoman Empire (modern day Kosovo)
- Died: 5 August 1752 (aged 50) Gjakova, Ottoman Empire (modern day Kosovo)
- Denomination: Roman Catholic
- Occupation: Catholic priest, bishop, researcher
- Education: Doctor of Philosophy in Theological Studies

Gjon Nikollë Kazazi (in Italian: Giovanni Battista Nicolovich Casasi) was an Albanian Catholic cleric, who served as Archbishop of the Diocese of Skopje, known for discovering Meshari of Gjon Buzuku.

== Biography ==
Monsignor Gjon Nikollë Kazazi was born on 1 January 1702 in Gjakova, Ottoman Empire (modern day Kosovo). He was an ethnic Albanian born into a Roman Catholic family, his family spoke in the Gheg dialect of the Albanian language. He finished elementary school in Gjakova, at 18 he continued theological studies at Illyric College of St. Peter in Fermo and graduated in 1727 at Illyric College of Loreto, in which he studied philosophy, rhetoric and grammar, in 1727 he got the title of doctor of philosophy and theology. After graduating he became a priest, in 1743 he became Archbishop of Shkup In 1740 he discovered Meshari of Gjon Buzuku. Monsignor Kazazi was the first Albanian researcher in Vatican Secret Archives. Kazaz also referred to detecting fever medicine against disease. He died and was buried in his hometown.
