= Fiamuri Arbërit =

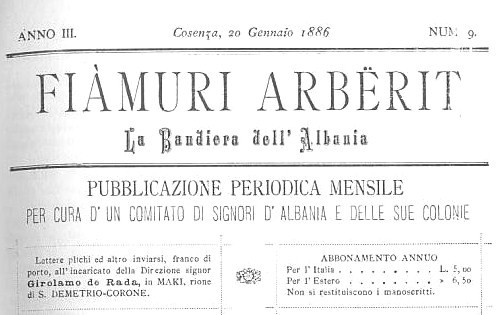
- January 1886 Italian-language issue of Fiamuri Arbërit
- Editor: Jeronim de Rada
- Categories: Politics, Literature, History, Folklore
- Frequency: Monthly
- First issue: January 2, 1883
- Final issue: 1887
- Country: Kingdom of Italy; Ottoman Empire; Kingdom of Greece
- Language: Albanian later Italian translations

Fiamuri Arbërit or Flamuri i Arbërit (English: Flag of Albania) was an Albanian magazine published from 1883 to 1887 by Jeronim de Rada, one of the most prominent figures of Albanian culture of the 19th century.

== History ==
Fiamuri Arbërit's first issue was published on 20 July 1883 in Cosenza, Italy by Jeronim de Rada, one of the leading figures of Albanian literature of the 19th century. Initially it was published only in Albanian in a Latin-based alphabet invented by de Rada, but later translations in Italian were also distributed. The journal, which featured subjects regarding Albanian literature, politics, history and folklore quickly became popular among Albanians and was widely distributed. The magazine was censored in the Ottoman Empire and the Kingdom of Greece.

In 1887 Anton Santori published for the first time parts of his best-known play Emira in Fiamuri Arbërit. Although the journal was officially disestablished in 1887, it was replaced by Arbri i Ri (Albanian: The Young Albanian) published by Zef Skiroi, who later also published Flamur i Shqipërisë.

== See also ==
- List of magazines in Albania
