= Shpresa Gjongecaj =

Albanian archaeologist

- Born: February 6, 1952 (age 74); Tirana, PR Albania
- Occupation: archaeologist

Shpresa Gjongecaj Vangjeli (born 6 February 1952) is an Albanian archaeologist and numismatist, who was the Director of the Institute of Archaeology at the Academy of Albanological Studies from 2008 to 2013. She is the recipient of the Vermeil Token from the French Numismatic Society and was appointed a Corresponding Member of the Archaeological Institute of America, both in recognition of her scholarship and services to numismatics.

== Biography ==
Gjongecaj was born on 6 February 1952 in Tirana, Albania. She studied at the Faculty of Philology at the University of Tirana in 1969 and graduated in Classical Languages (Latin and Ancient Greek) in 1973. She later received specialized training in numismatics with Olivier Picard at the Sorbonne (Paris IV) and the French School at Athens, with Michel Amandry in the Medal Office in Paris, and with Giovani Gorini (gl) at the University of Padua. In 1983 she was awarded her doctorate, with a thesis entitled "Coins of Illyrian Cities", under the direction of Selim Islami (sq).

Since 1974 she has been professionally linked to the Institute of Archaeology at the Academy of Albanological Studies. In 1994 she held a Visiting Fellowship at the Heberden Coin Room at the Ashmolean Museum, Oxford. Between 1999 and 2007 she was the head of the Department of Antiquities in the Institute of Archaeology at the Academy of Albanological Studies, and from 2008 to 2013 she was Director of the Institute of Archaeology.

Gjongecaj is also Professor of Numismatics at the University of Tirana and has participated in a number of archaeological expeditions and research projects. She led research on the Hija e Korbit Hoard, an assemblage of 618 silver coins. She has also worked on the Roman coins of Butrint, with Sam Moorhead and Richard Abdy. She has worked on coins from the prehistoric burial tumulus of Lofkënd in Albania.

== Recognition ==
- In 2000 she was awarded the Vermeil Token - the medal of the French Numismatic Society (fr).
- In 2010 she was appointed a Corresponding Member of the Archaeological Institute of America.

== Selected works ==
=== Monographs ===
- Thesare me monedha antike të gjetura në Shqipëri (shek. V-I p.Kr) (Tirana, 2015).
- Trésors de monnaies antiques trouvés en Albanie (Ve-Ier siècle av. J.-C.), with O. Picard (École française d'Athènes, Athens, 2019).

=== Articles ===
- (1995). "Le monnayage d'argent d'Égine et le trésor de Hollm (Albanie) 1991", with H. Nicolet-Pierre, in Bulletin de Correspondance Hellénique, 119-1. Páxinas 283-338.
- (1998). "Le trésor de Dimalla 1973 et le passage du monnayage hellénistique au monnayage impérial à Apollonia d'Illyrie", with O. Picard, in Bulletin de Correspondance Hellénique, 122-2. Páxinas 511-527.
- (2001). "Apollonia et le monnayage épirote: le trésor de Bakërr", with O. Picard, in Revue Numismatique, 157. Páxinas 323-249.
- (2003). "Monnaies d’Apollonia", with O. Picard, in Iliria, 31. Páxinas 259-266.
- (2010). "Le monnayage de Phoinikè sous l’empire romain", in Revue Numismatique, 166. Páxinas 383-396.
- (1998). Gjongecaj, Shpresa. "Le trésor de Kreshpan (Albanie)." Revue numismatique 6.153, 81-102.
