= Petran =

- Administrative unit
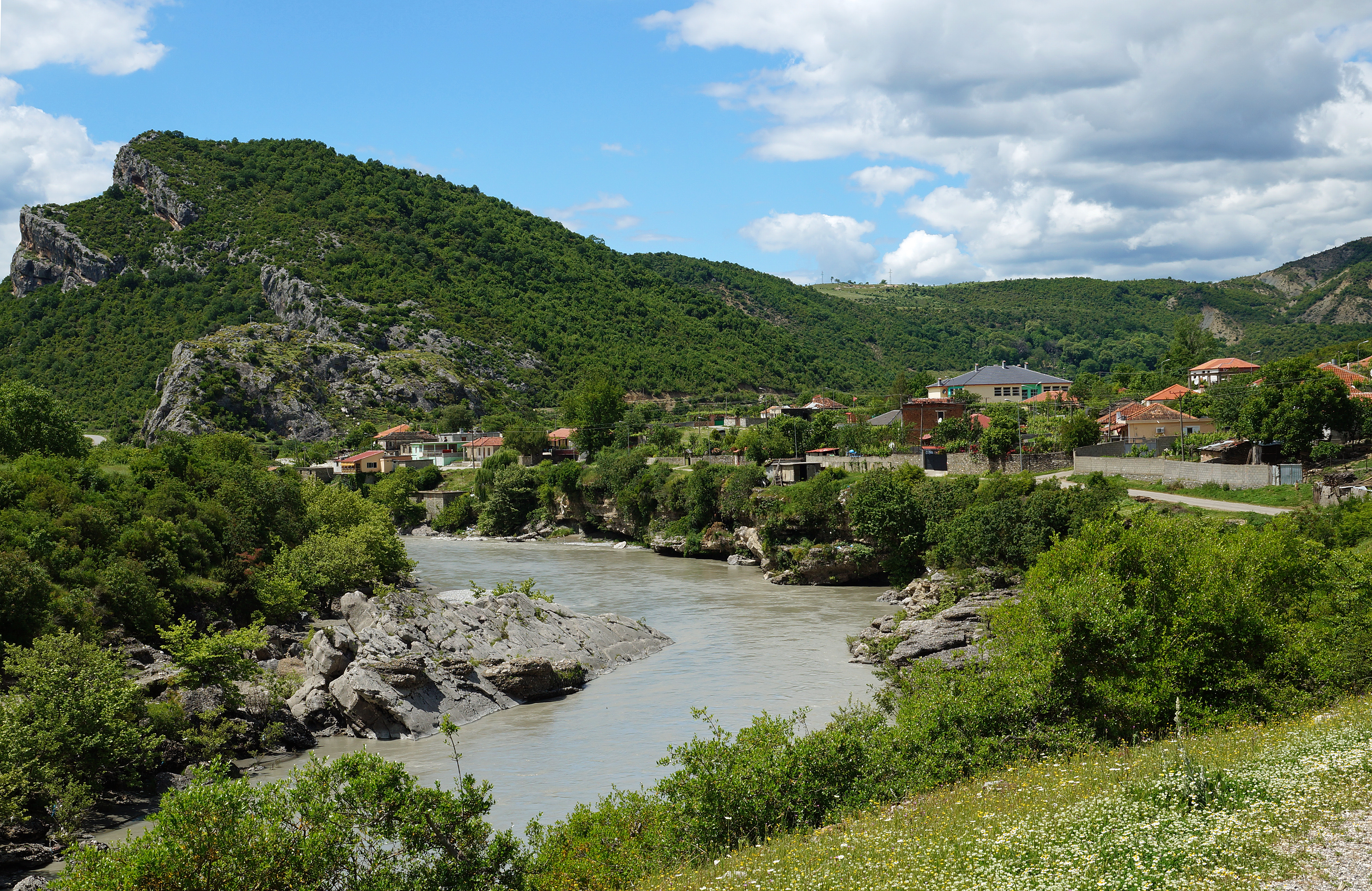
- The village of Petran

- Location within Albania
- Coordinates: 40°12′N 20°24′E
- Country: Albania
- County: Gjirokastër
- Municipality: Përmet

Population (2011)
  - Administrative unit: 1,622
- Time zone: UTC+1 (CET)
  - Summer (DST): UTC+2 (CEST)

Petran is a village and a former municipality in Gjirokastër County, southern Albania. At the 2015 local government reform it became a subdivision of the municipality Përmet. The population at the 2011 census was 1,622. The municipal unit consists of the villages Petran, Leshnicë, Leusë, Lipë, Qilarishtë, Badilonjë, Benjë-Novoselë, Delvinë, Kaludh, Lupckë, Gjinakar (Gjinkar), Ogdunan, Izgar, Lipivan-Trabozishtë, Tremisht and Bodar.

== Notable people ==
- Stath Melani, Orthodox priest and participant in the Congress of Manastir, from Melan.

== Sources ==
- Lauria, Antonio; Flora, Valbona; Guza, Kamela (2020). Five Albanian Villages : guidelines for a Sustainable Tourism Development through the Enhancement of the Cultural Heritage (PDF). Firenze University Press. ISBN 978-88-5518-174-7. Archived from the original (PDF) on 2021-11-21.
