= Tupale =

Tupale Тупале (Serbian) Tupallë (Albanian)
- Village
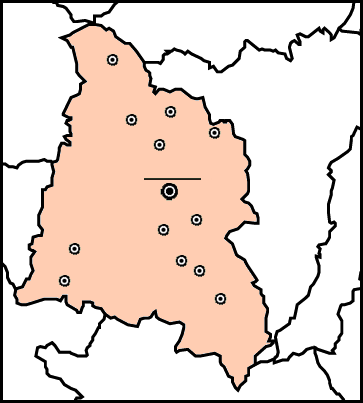

- Location within Serbia
- Country: Serbia
- District: Jablanica District
- Municipality: Medveđa

Population (2002)
  - Total: 725
- Time zone: UTC+1 (CET)
  - Summer (DST): UTC+2 (CEST)

Tupale (Serbian Cyrillic: Тупале, Albanian: Tupallë) is a village in Serbia. It is located in the Medveđa municipality, in the Jablanica District. According to the 2002 census, the town had a population of 725. Of these, 723 (99,72 %) were ethnic Albanians, and 2 (0,27 %) others.

== Notable people ==
- Idriz Ajeti
