= Abdulla Tafa =

Albanian art critic and academic (1947–2015)

Abdulla Tafa (27 July 1947 – 1 July 2015) was an Albanian art critic and academic researcher. He was the author of many essays, articles and books dedicated to famous Albanian artists such as the painter Ibrahim Kodra and composer Mustafa Krantja. Tafa was also a member of the European Academy of Sciences and Arts.

== See also ==
- Modern Albanian art
