= Idriz Ajeti =

Albanian linguist

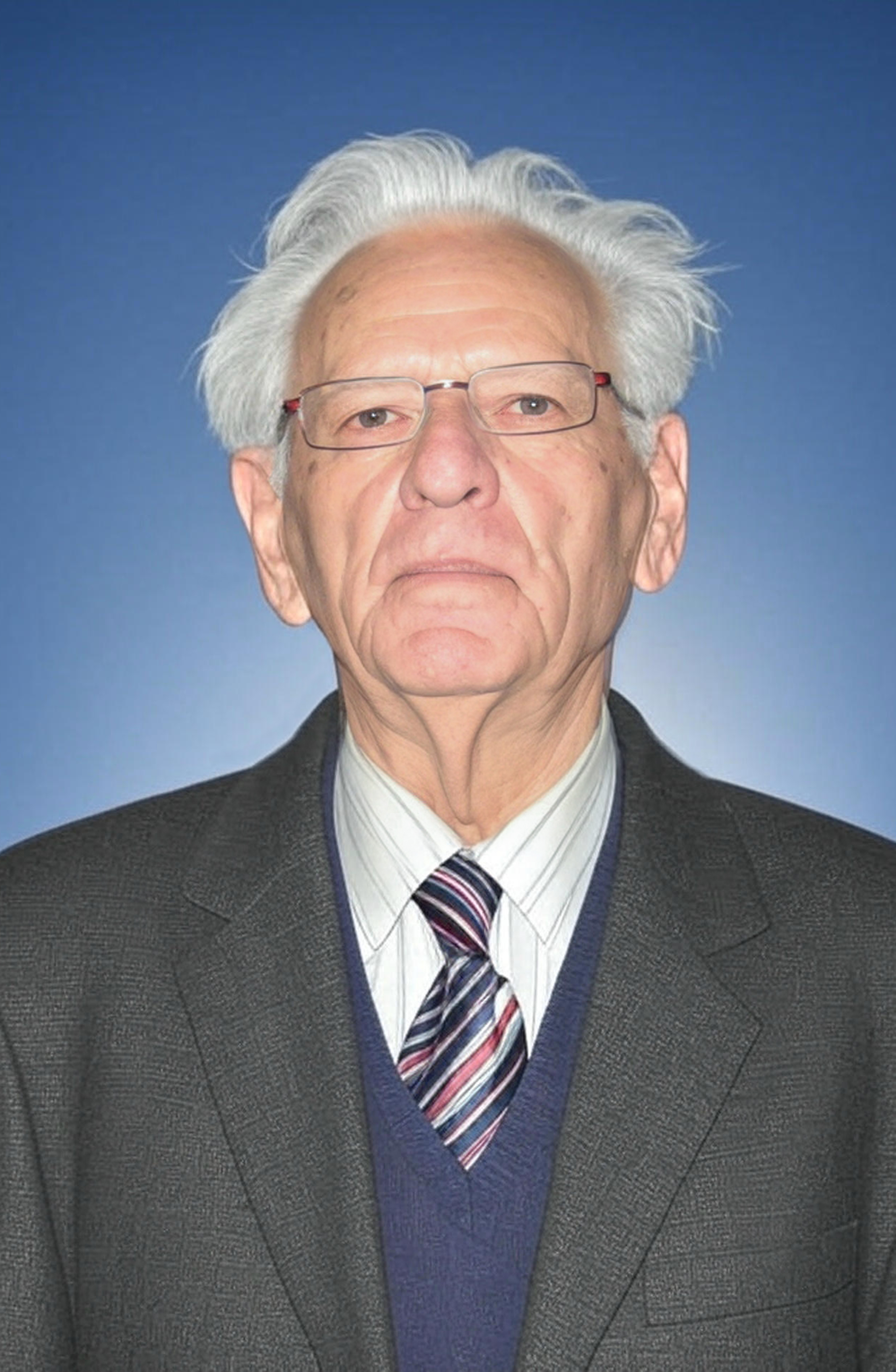
- Ajeti in 2008
- Born: June 26, 1917; Tupale, Bulgarian-Occupied Serbia
- Died: February 13, 2019 (aged 101); Pristina, Kosovo
- Occupation: Albanologist

Idriz Ajeti (26 June 1917 – 13 February 2019) was an Albanologist from Kosovo and one of the main researchers and authorities on the Albanian language studies of post World War II. He was involved for a long period in the academic life of the University of Pristina, and was a member of the Academy of Sciences and Arts of Kosovo, serving as its chairman for seven years.

== Life ==
Ajeti was born on 26 June 1917 in the Tupale (Albanian: Tupallë) village of the Upper Jablanica region in Serbia (modern Medveđa municipality). He finished the Serbian language elementary school in the nearby Sijarinska Banja village which he finished by 1930, and high school studies in the Royal Madrasa in Skopje in 1938. Ajeti registered in the Romanistics branch of the Faculty of Philosophy of the University of Zagreb, but finished his studies after the end of World War II, precisely in 1949, graduating from the Faculty of Philosophy in the University of Belgrade.

From 1949 to 1953 he taught Albanian at a high school in Pristina; from 1953 to 1960 he worked as pedagogue in the Albanology branch of the University of Belgrade. In 1958 he gave his dissertation thesis Zhvillimi historik i së folmes gege të shqiptarëve të Zarës së Dalmacisë (Historical development of the Gheg dialect of the Albanians of Zadar in Dalmatia).

In 1960 he received the academic title of Docent, and in 1968 the Professor one, at the same time lecturing in Albanian Language and Literature in the Faculty of Philosophy of the University of Pristina. He was one of the initiators of the Gjurmime Albanologjike ("Albanological Reconnaissance") scientific magazine. Another achievement was the establishment of the Albanian culture seminary for the foreign albanologists.

During 1969–71, Ajeti served as Director of the Albanological Institute, during 1971–73 as dean of Faculty of Philosophy in Pristina, and during 1973–75 as rector of the University of Pristina. He was also Chairman of the Academy of Sciences and Arts of Kosovo during 1979–81, and 1996–99.

He participated in the Orthography Congress of 1972 in Tirana, where the standard orthographic rules of the Albanian language were defined, and was a signatory.

He has received several acknowledgments and honors, between others "7 July" award of the SR Serbia and the AVNOJ one.

== Work ==
Ajeti's work concentrated on the research on the Albanian language dialects from the diachronic point of view, old linguistic documents written in Ottoman Alphabet, and reciprocal Albania-Serbian relations. He also touched topics on nowadays Albanian language, being an initiator and contributor to many linguistic consults and symposiums. He also co-authored Albanian language and literature textbooks for high school and college students.

== Main publications ==
Books

- Pamje historike e ligjërimit shqip të Gjakovës në fillim të shekullit XIX ("Historical view of the Albanian speaking in Gjakova at beginning of the 19th century"), Pristina: "Rilindja", 1960.
- Istorijski razvitak gegijskog govora Arbanasa kod Zadar ("Historical development of the Gheg dialect of the Albanians of Zadar"), Sarajevo: Balkanološki institut Naučnog društva BiH, 1961.
- Hymje në historinë e gjuhës shqipe ("Introduction to the history of the Albanian language"), Pristina: Fakulteti Filozofik i Prishtinës, Katedra albanologjike, 1963.
- Ortografia e gjuhës shqipe ("Orthography of the Albanian language"), as co-author with Sulejman Drini, Hasan Vokshi, Mehdi Bardhi, and Latif Mulaku, Belgrade: Entity of textbooks publishing of the SR Serbia, 1964.
- Hymje në historinë e gjuhës shqipe ("Introduction to the history of the Albanian language"), II edition, Pristina: Fakulteti Filozofik i Prishtinës, Katedra Albanologjike, 1965.
- Historia e gjuhës shqipe (Morfologjia historike) ("The history of the Albanian language [historical morphology]"), Pristina, 1969.
- Probleme të historisë së gjuhës shqipe ("Issues on the history of the Albanian language"), as editor, Pristina: "Rilindja", 1971.
- Studije iz istorije albanskog jezika I ("Linguistic studies on the Albanian language I"), Pristina: ASHAK, 1982.
- Historia e gjuhës shqipe (morfologjia historike) ("The history of the Albanian language [historical morphology]"), II edition, Pristina: Enti i Teksteve dhe i Mjeteve Mësimore, 1983.
- Studime gjuhësore në fushë të shqipes II ("Linguistic studies on the Albanian language II"), Pristina: "Rilindja", 1985.
- Studime gjuhësore në fushë të shqipes III ("Linguistic studies on the Albanian language III"), Pristina: "Rilindja", 1985.
- Studime gjuhësore në fushë të shqipes IV ("Linguistic studies on the Albanian language IV"), Pristina: "Rilindja", 1989.
- Shqiptarët dhe gjuha e tyre ("Albanians and their language"), Pristina:A SHAK – special editions, 1994.
- Për të vërtetën shkencore ("For the scientific truth"), Pristina: ASHAK, 2006.
- Pararendësi ("The precursor"), Pristina: "Botimet Koha", 2011.

His work was recently collected in 5 volumes and published by the Academy of Sciences of Kosovo (ASHAK) in Pristina:

- Vepra 1 (Work 1), 1997, of 175 pages.
- Vepra 2 (Work 2), 1998, of 303 pages.
- Vepra 3 (Work 3), 1998, of 301 pages.
- Vepra 4 (Work 4), 2001, of 294 pages.
- Vepra 5 (Work 5), 2002, of 288 pages.

Textbooks and translations

- Letërsia jugosllave ("Yugoslav literature"), dispense, Pristina 1947.
- Libër leximi për klasën IV të shkollave fillore ("Reading textbook for the 4th grade of the elementary school"), as co-author with Stathi Kostari and Jani Gjinon, Pristina, 1948.
- Nga letërsia shqipe ("From the Albanian literature"), as co-author with Hasan Vokshi and Mustafa Bakija, Pristina 1951.
- Arkadije Gajdar, Timuri dhe çeta e tij ("Arkady Gaidar, Timur, and his cheta"), translation from Serbo-Croatian together with Mustafa Bakija, Pristina 1951.
- Nga proza jugosllave ("From the Yugoslav prose"), co-author with Tajar Hatipi, Nebil Dino, Vehap Shita, and Mustafa Bakija, Pristina 1952.
- Libër leximi për klasën V të shkollës tetëvjeçare ("Reading textbook for the 5th grade of the elementary school"), as co-author with Anton Çeta and Mustafa Bakija, Pristina 1954.
- Libër për klasën V të shkollës tetëvjeçare ("Book for 5th grade of elementary school"), II edition, as co-author with Anton Çeta and Mustafa Bakija, Pristina 1955.
- Ndodhinat e Nikoletin Bursaçit ("Adventures of Nikoletina Bursać") of Branko Ćopić, translation from Serbo-Croatian, Pristina: "Milladin Popoviq", 1957.
- Šiptarski u 30 lekcija za srpskohrvatskog čitaoca ("Albanian language in 30 lessons for the Serbo-Croatian readers"), as co-author with Dragutin Mićović, Pristina: "Jedinstvo", 1959.

Ajeti has also written a vast number of scientific articles and monographs.

== See also ==
- Rexhep Qosja
- Shaban Demiraj
- Androkli Kostallari
- Eqrem Çabej
- Mahir Domi
