= Studime Historike =

Scientific magazine on Albanian studies

Historical Studies
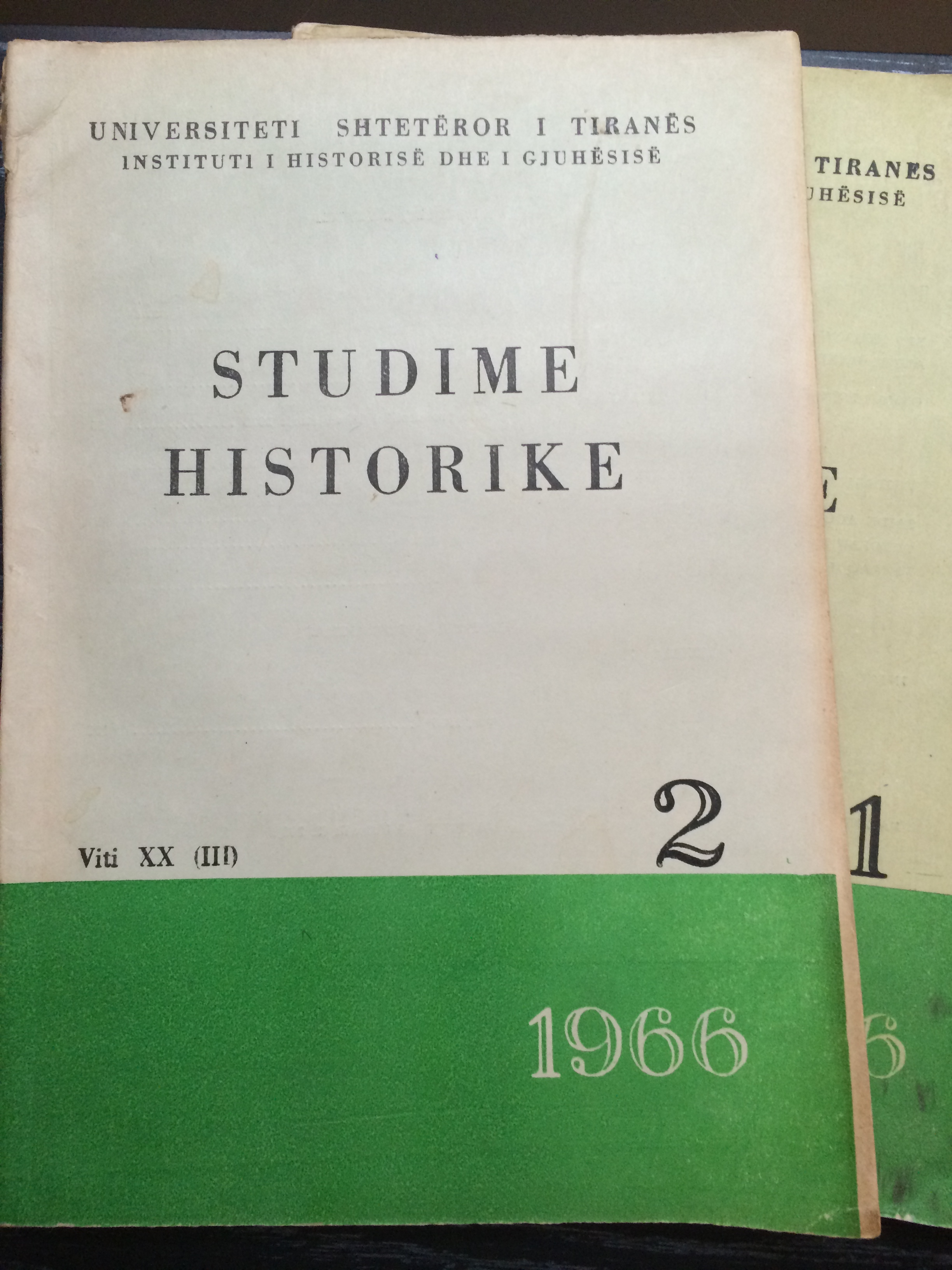
- Frequency: Currently: quarterly Previously: (see History section)
- Publisher: Albanian Institute of History
- Founded: 1964
- Country: Albania
- Based in: Tirana
- Language: Albanian, French, English
- ISSN: 0563-5799
- OCLC: 557456467

Studime Historike ("Historical Studies") is a scientific magazine on albanology. It is published by the Institute of History, part of the Centre of Albanological Studies in Tirana, Albania.

It is profilised as a bulletin short studies or articles dealing with Albanian history, from antiquity to nowadays. Beside historical thematic, it publishes studies presented in scientific events as conferences and symposiums, archival documents, pieces of historical memoirs and materials, information of scientific activities organised by the Institute of History, etc.

It provides information of latest publications of the Albanian Institute of History, both Albanian and foreign albanologists.

== History ==
Studime Historike is the first historical magazine in Albania. It started as Buletini i Institutit të Studimeve (Bulletin of the Institute of Studies), published by the Albanian Institute of History established in 1946, representing the first scientific institute in post World War II Albania. It had separate sections for linguistics, literary studies, and history. After the first issue with this name, it promptly changed to Buletin i Institutit të Shkencave (Bulletin of the Institute of Sciences), published by the Albanian Institute of Science (1948–1957) which had replaced the Institute of Studies. The magazine preserved it previous structure. In 1952, it split in two separate publications: Buletini për Shkencat Natyrore (Bulletin for the Natural Sciences), and Bulletini për Shkencat Shoqërore (Bulletin for Social Studies). The later one focused on linguistics, history, archaeology, ethnography, etc. Articles started being accompanied by a resume in French.

In 1955, the corresponding sections of social studies merged into the Albanian Institute of History and Linguistics (Albanian: Instituti i Historisë dhe i Gjuhësisë), which affiliated with the University of Tirana during 1957–1972. During 1957–1964, the magazine came out as Buletin i Universitetit të Tiranës – seria shkencat shoqërore (Bulletin of the University of Tirana – series on social studies). After 1964, the Institute of History and Linguistics started publishing Studime Historike (one issue every three months), and the other magazine Studime Filologjike (Philological studies).

With the establishment of the Albanian Academy of Sciences in 1972, the Institute of History and Linguistics split into the Instituti i Historisë (Institute of History) and Instituti i Gjuhës dhe Letërsisë (Institute of Linguistics and Literature) which served as the main institutions of albanology, both affiliated with the Academy of Sciences. Starting from 1973, "Studime Historike", restarted coming out 4 times per year. In 1979, the Institute of History grew and expanded with additional sections, each focusing on separate periods of history, i.e. sections for Albanian National Awakening, Albania during World War II, Ethnic History, History of Kosovo, etc. Around 35 historians and albanologues contributed during this period. The articles were still accompanied by a resume in French.

After 1991, with the fall of communism in Albania, the number of associated staff of the Institute of History decreased significantly. After the issues 3-4 of 1991, "Studime Historike" stopped publishing for two years. It restarted in 1994 until 1997 once a year, and later twice a year with around 250-300 pages each issue. In 2008, the institute was disaffiliated with the Albanian Academy of Sciences, joining the Centre of Albanological Studies. It continued with 16 members in 3 departments (Middle Ages and National Awakening, post Independence, and Contemporary Studies).

== Staff ==
Editors-in-chief:

- Stefanaq Pollo (1964–1991)
- Kasem Biçoku (1994–1996)
- Ana Lalaj (1997–2005)
- Marenglen Verli (2005–2007)
- Beqir Meta (2008–2014)

Other main contributors were Aleks Buda, Deko Rusi, Gani Strazimiri, Luan Omari, Mentar Belegu, Petro Lalaj, Rrok Zojzi, Selim Islami, Zija Xholi, Muin Çami, Hasan Ceka, Ndreçi Plasari, Viron Koka, Vladimir Misja, Aleksandër Meksi, Kristaq Prifti, Arben Puto, Besim Bardhoshi, Dervish Gjiriti, Koço Bozhori, Dhorka Dhamo, Myzafer Korkuti, Shyqyri Ballvora, Selami Pulaha, Stavri Naçi, Iliaz Fishta, Gazmend Shpuza, Zihni Haskaj, Veniamin Toçi, Xhemil Frashëri, Xhelal Gjeçovi, Jorgo Bulo, Luan Malltezi, Lefter Nasi, Dilaver Sadikaj, Hysni Myzyri, Ferit Duka, Pëllumb Xhufi, Demir Dyrmishi, Fatmira Musaj, Hamit Kaba, Enriketa Kambo, Muharrem Dezhgiu, Dritan Egro, Ledia Dushku, Sonila Boçi, Edmond Malaj etc.

== See also ==
- Gjuha Jonë
- Kultura Popullore
- List of magazines in Albania
