= Kultura Popullore =

Folkloric Culture
- Frequency: Currently: semi-annual
- Publisher: Albanian Institute of Folkloric Culture (Centre of Albanological Studies)
- Founded: 1980
- Country: Albania
- Based in: Rr. Kont Urani, 3, Tirana
- Language: Albanian, English
- ISSN: 0452-8034
- OCLC: 183342960

Kultura Popullore (Folkloric Culture) is a quarterly magazine published in Tirana, Albania by the Centre of Albanological Studies. It publishes scientific articles on different fields of Albanian ethnography and folklore.

The magazine started in 1980, as one of scientific magazines of the Albanian Academy of Sciences, specifically the Institute of Folkloric Culture, established in 1979 by merging the former Institute of Folklore with the Ethnography Section of the Institute of History, both branches of the Academy of Science.
With the creation of the Centre of Albanological Studies in 1980, the Institute of Folkloric Culture merged into it and disaffiliated with the Academy, carrying over all its periodicals.

== See also ==
- Studime Historike
- Studime Filologjike
- Gjuha Jonë
