= Andrea Ekonomi =

Albanian teacher (1879–1934)

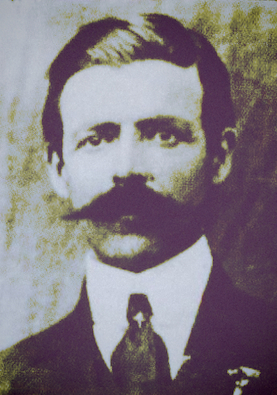
- Born: July 14, 1879; Kavajë, Ottoman Empire (now Albania)
- Died: 11 March 1934 (aged 54); Tirana, Albania
- Occupations: Educator; activist
- Awards: People's Teacher

Andrea Ilia Ekonomi (14 July 1879 – 11 March 1934) was an Albanian teacher, patriot and intellectual. Along with Pal Xhumari, he represented Kavajë at the Church Congress of Berat in 1922.

== Early life ==
Andrea Ekonomi was born in Kavajë to the well-known Ekonomi family. After completing studies at the local Greek school in his hometown he went on to study for a brief period in Romania.

== Career ==
He returned home in 1902 and began teaching written Albanian to the local population despite the disliked from the central Ottoman authorities. Ekonomi would later move to Egypt and there he was acquainted with intellectuals Jani Vruho and Thanas Tashko. Persuaded to return home by Ottoman authorities, he transferred to the southern town of Gjirokastër in 1908 where he opened the first official secularist Albanian language school there, "Iliria". In 1913, he was elected president of the "Ditunia" society which struggled to promote education on a national level. After the departure of Prince Wied like many other Albanians, Ekonomi migrated to Bari, Italy. He returned home in 1920 and two years later was elected as one of the delegates to represent Kavajë at the Church Congress of Berat, which established the autonomous Albanian Orthodox Church.

== Death and legacy ==
Ekonomi died suddenly and suspiciously in 1934 at a hospital in Tirana. On November 26, 1962, he was posthumously awarded the Order "For Patriotic Duties Class III." and on December 10, 1992, he was awarded the title "People's Teacher".
