= Leusë =

Village in Gjirokastër County, Albania

- Village
- Location within Albania
- Coordinates: 40.218°N 20.356°E
- Country: Albania
- County: Gjirokastër
- Municipality: Përmet
- Administrative unit: Petran
- Time zone: UTC+1 (CET)
  - Summer (DST): UTC+2 (CEST)

Leusë (Albanian definite form: Leusa) is a village in Gjirokastër County, southern Albania. At the 2015 local government reform it became part of the municipality Përmet.

== Name ==
Leusë takes its name from the Greek word "Eleusa" (Ελεούσα), which means "merciful". "Virgin Eleusa" is also one of the names of the Virgin Mary in Eastern Orthodox tradition.

== History ==
The settlement of Leusë is first mentioned in Ottoman fiscal records as far back as 1431. The location of the village perhaps derived from its vicinity to an easy route toward Ioannina that thus ensured a swift communication with Greece. As of 1880, Aromanians of the Farsharot subgroup inhabited the village. A school was opened in 1920. The village suffered great damage during World War II.

With the advent of the Albanian communist regime, most of the original inhabitants of the village emigrated and were replaced by peasant families from surrounding villages that worked in the new collectivised structures.

== Geography ==
Leusë is located on the slopes of Dhëmbel mountain, 1.3 kilometres (0.81 miles) from Përmet.

== Population ==
Nearly all the inhabitants of Leusë are Eastern Orthodox Christians. As of 2019, the village was left with around 120 residents, mostly elderly.

== Major festivities ==
The Feast of the Dormition of Mary is celebrated in Leusë according to a ritual which takes place throughout villages in southern Albania. People gather around the church on the night of 14 August and concludes with a mass in honour of the Virgin Mary on the following morning. Leusë's church falls within the general category of post-Byzantine churches in Albania.

A street festival also takes place in the narrow streets of Leusë at 14 August with live music performed by local folk groups.

== Economy ==
Transhumance is still practiced in Leusë. The inhabitants of Leusë face a critical situation regarding the supply of both water and electricity. The village does not have a sewage network.
