= Timeline of Illyrian history =

The Illyrians (Ancient Greek: Ἰλλυριοί, Illyrioi; Latin: Illyrii) were a group of Indo-European speaking peoples, who inhabited the western Balkan Peninsula in ancient times. They constituted one of the three main Paleo-Balkan populations, along with the Thracians and Greeks.

== Timeline ==
- Enchelii under Cadmus against Illyrians in Illyria, Illyrian defeat

=== 25th century BC ===
- Around 2500 BC, the proto-Illyrian culture begins to form when indigenous Danubian farmers were invaded by warrior-herders belonging to the Yamnaya culture from the Plateau of Phrygia. They inhabit the western half of the Balkan Peninsula.

=== 12th century BC ===
- 1200BC (or perhaps earlier), some Illyrians begin a movement to Gaul, Spain, England, northern and central Italy, Poland and even Scandinavia.

=== 10th century BC ===
- 1000 BC, Illyrians mining salt in Gmunden, present-day Austria; by 900 BC they had lost their silver mines in Oberzeiring to the Celts.

=== 8th century BC ===
- 800 BC, Illyrian culture begins to flourish on the coasts of the Adriatic, centered in Glasinac and Shkodra.
- 735 BC, Liburnians abandon Corfu under pressure from Corinthian ruler Hersikrates. First recorded battle between Illyrians and Greeks.

=== 7th century BC ===
- 691 BC. First Illyrian invasion of Macedonia after bad relations developed.
- ? BC. Gaularos, ruler of the Taulanti state wages war on the Macedonians.
- 628 BC. Liburnians expelled from Durrës by Corinthians which were invited as aid by the neighbouring Taulantii.
- 602 BC. Philip I of Macedon is killed in battle by the Illyrians

=== 6th century BC ===
- 524 BC. Etruscans defeat the Liburnians in order to open trade routes to the Aegean.
- 524 BC. Aristodemus of Cumae defeats the allied Daunian and Etruscan armies
- 511 BC. Persians under Megabazus defeat the Paeonians and depart two of their tribes to Darius in Asia.
- 500 BC. Start of the Tarentine-Iapygian wars results in an Iapygian defeat

=== 5th century BC ===
- 490 BC. Tarentines defeat the Messapians.
- 466 BC. Taranto again defeated by the Iapygians.
- 460 BC. Competitive trading leads to the destruction of Thronion by Apollonia.
- 460 BC. Opis of the Iapyges falls in battle against Taranto.
- 440 BC. Brindidi and Thurrii enter into an alliance against Taranto.
- 436 BC. Taulantii attack the city of Epidamnos contributing to the start of the Peloponnesian War.
- 433 BC. Messapian-Thurian victory over the Lucanians in the Sybaris lain.
- 432 BC. Messapian-Thurian forces successfully throw off another Lucanian invasion in the Crati gorge.
- 430 BC. Grabus of the royal house of the Grabaei enters an alliance with Athens.
- 429 BC. Agrianes become subject to the Odrysian kingdom.
- 424 BC. Autariatae expand their territory, pushing the Thracian Triballi eastwards into western Serbia and Bulgaria.
- 423 BC. Illyrians & Lyncestians cause the Macedonians to flee and the Spartans to escape during the Peloponnesian War (Battle of Lyncestis).
- 418 BC. Artas made a proxenos of Athens as operations in Sicily begin.
- 413 BC. Artas supplies Athens with one hundred and fifty javelin-throwers for the war against Syracuse.

=== 4th century BC ===
- 399 BC. New conflict develops between Sirras and Archelaus I of Macedonian over the Lyncestian case
- 393 BC. Dardanians rule Macedonia through a puppet king after defeating Amyntas III of Macedon under Argaeus II
- 392 BC. Amyntas III allied with the Thessalians takes Macedonia under his rule from the Dardanians
- 385 BC. Bardyllis raids Epirus after defeating the Mollosians
- 385 BC. Agesilaus of Sparta drives off the Dardanians under Bardyllis, expelling them from Epirus
- 360 BC. Arymbas of the Mollosians defeats the Illyrians after they raided and looted Epirus
- 360 BC. Southern Paeonian tribes launch raids against Macedonia in support of an Illyrian invasion
- 359 BC. The death of Agis leads to the subjection of the Paeonian State by Macedonia
- 359 BC. Perdiccas III of Macedon killed in an attempt to reconquer upper Macedonia
- 358 BC. Philip II of Macedon defeats the Illyrians. Bardyllis probably died during the battle at the age of 90. Illyrians sued for peace.
- 356 BC. Lycceius joins the anti-Macedonian coalition led by Athens which includes Grabos
- 356 BC. Parmenio surprises Grabos with a defeat before he is able to converge with his allies in Athens and Thrace and Paeonia
- 352 BC. Agrianes become allies of Philip II
- 344 BC. Caeria loses her life in a battle against Cynane and her army is defeated
- 344 BC. The Taulantii State is limited to the lands along the Adriatic after the defeat of Pleuratus I against Philip II
- 337 BC. Pleurias almost succeeds in killing Philip II during his Balkan campaigns
- 335 BC. Alexander the Great subjects the Illyrian states defeating Cleitus and Glaukias in the battle of Pelium
- 335 BC. First part of the Illyrian Revolt ends in failure with the defeat of Pleurias
- 323 BC. Cynane, an Illyrian herself leads a Macedonian army to victory over the Illyrians
- 317 BC. Glaucias enters in league with the Greek colonies while Cassander is at a low ebb
- 312 BC. Acrotatus of Sparta aids Glaucias in abolishing the Macedonian garrison in Apollonia
- 312 BC. Glaucias obtains control of Epidamus
- 310 BC. The Autariatae State ceases to exist after continuous Celtic migrations and conflicts
- 307 BC. Glaucias invades Epirus and establishes Pyrrhus as king

=== 3rd century BC ===
- 280 BC. Celts invade the Balkan peninsula, crossing through Dardanian and Paeonian territory into Macedonia and Greece, reaching Thermopylae by 279 BC. Dardanian please for help unanswered by Macedonian king Ptolemy Keraunos.
- 279 BC. Celts defeated after raiding Delphi by a Greek coalition. They hastily retreat to the north. Along the way they are attacked by Dardanians and lose most of their plunder. Autariatai absorbed by the Celts.
- 231 BC. Agron, king of the Ardiaei, sends his fleet to relieve the Acarnanian city Medeon from a siege by the Aetolians. His army carries a large victory
- 230 BC. Longarus, king of the Dardanians captures Bylazora from the Paeonians
- 230 BC. Queen Teuta starts her pirate campaign by capturing the Epirote capital Phoenice
- 229 BC. Illyrian and Acarnanian ships defeat a combined Aetolian and Achaean fleet off the island of Paxos
- 229 BC. The Illyrian commander Demetrius of Pharos occupies the island of Corcyra, but soon prefers to pass it over to the Romans
- 229 BC. Start of the First Illyrian War, the Romans cross the Adriatic for the first time in reaction to Teuta's threats of Roman trade routes
- 228 BC. Illyrians suffer multiple defeats by the Romans. End of First Illyrian War
- 220 BC. Start of the Second Illyrian War when Demetrius of Pharos builds up a new Illyrian navy and violates the Roman-Illyrian treaty by attacking Aegean cities
- 219 BC. Aemilius Paulus commands the Roman armies against the Illyrians under Demetrius of Pharos inflicting multiple Illyrian defeats. This causes Demetrius to flee to Macedonia thus ending the Second Illyrian War
- 218 BC. Scerdilaidas, an ally of Macedonia helps Philip during the Social War.

=== 2nd century BC ===
Collapse of southern Illyrian nations and the start of Roman campaigns against Illyrian interior

- 183 BC. Philip V of Macedon makes an alliance with the Bastarnae to settle in Dardanian territory and wipe out the Dardanians. Philips plan fails, Bastarnae raid Dardanian territory but do not settle and go back.
- 181 BC. The Histri attempt to prevent the Romans from building Aquileia to no avail. Shortly after this Epulon becomes ruler of the Histri and unites much of Histria ruling from Nesactium.
- 180 BC. Dalmatians declares themselves independent from the rule of Gentius, king of the Ardiaei.
- 177 BC. Istrian Peninsula captured by Romans by diverting a river which protected Epulon's stronghold Nesactium, and provided it with water. Last stand of the Histri.
- 170 BC. Gentius and Perseus of Macedonia start forming alliance to counter the Romans
- 168 BC. Romans defeat Gentius at the Ardiaean capital Skodra bringing an end to the Illyrian kingdom. King Gentius was brought to Rome as a prisoner.
- 155 BC. Romans destroy the Dalmatian capital Delminium
- 119 BC. Pannonians defeated by Romans in Siscia

=== 1st century BC ===
- 76 BC. Final defeat of the Dalmatians with the capture of the city port of Salona
- 51 BC. Delmatae defeat Liburnians, Roman main allies and clients on the Adriatic. Because of this conflict Delmatae will join Pompey in the civil war while Liburnians would support Caesar with their navies. Iapodes use the entire situation to slip away from Roman control and stop paying tribute for several decades.
- 49 BC. Liburnian communities take different sides in the civil war against Caesar and Pompey near the island of Krk
- 48 BC. Cornificius and Gabinus ambushed by Dalmatae during their return from campaign
- 39 BC. Gaius Asinius Pollio against Partheni, Illyrian defeat
- 35 BC. Octavius against Pannonians in Siscia, Illyrian defeat
- 34 BC. Iapydes finally conquered by the Romans under Octavius Augustus.
- 28 BC. Dardania get annexed by the Romans
- 9 BC. Tiberius (since 12 BC) and Scordisci against Illyrians in Dalmatia, Illyrian defeat

=== 1st century AD ===
- 6 AD. The Daesitiates under their ruler Bato I start Great Illyrian uprising also known as Bellum Batonianum. After initial successes against Romans the insurrection spreads.
- 7 AD. Caecina Severus defeats Daesitiates and Breuci. Despite their defeat the Illyrians late inflict heavy casualties at the Battle of Sirmium and are later strengthened when more Illyrian tribes join in the rebellion
- 7 AD. Three Roman generals and legionaries sent to defeat the massive Illyrian army
- 8 AD. Bato II surrenders his forces to Tiberius
- 9 AD. After fierce fighting Bato I surrenders to the Romans marking the last Illyrian attempt for independence

=== 7th century AD ===
- The term "Illyrians" last appears in the historical record in the 7th century, referring to a Byzantine garrison operating within the former Roman province of Illyricum.

== See also ==
- Illyria
- Illyrian kingdom
