= Mapo (magazine) =

Weekly magazine published in Albania

- Frequency: Weekly
- Founded: 2006
- Final issue: 9 September 2011
- Country: Albania
- Based in: Tirana
- Language: Albanian

Mapo was a weekly magazine published in Albania existed between 2006 and 2011.

== History and profile ==
Mapo was started 2006 in as a joint initiative between the European University of Tirana and Albanian businessman, Agim Shënediella. It had an oppositional stance.

The magazine was closed on 9 September 2011. It is alleged that the reasons behind its closing the doors were not economical but were related to the magazine's anti-government stance. In 2012 it was restarted as a daily newspaper.
