= Acholius =

3rd-century Roman historian and official

Acholius only appears four times in Historia Augusta and according Ronald Syme, is a hoax from imagination of Historia Augusta's author.

Historia Augusta said about Acholius this doubtfully career:

Acholius held the office of Magister Admissionum in the reign of Valerian (253—260 AD). One of his works was titled Acta, and contained an account of the history of Aurelian. It was in nine books at least. He also wrote a life of Alexander Severus.

== Bibliography ==
- Syme, Ronald (1983). Historia Augusta Papers. United Kingdom: Clarendon Press. ISBN 978-0-19-814853-1.
