= Mehr Licht! =

Albanian quarterly literary and cultural magazine

- Editor-in-chief: Mira Meksi
- Categories: Literary magazine Cultural magazine
- Frequency: Quarterly
- Founded: 1996; 29 years ago
- Country: Albania
- Language: Albanian

Mehr Licht! (German for 'More Light') is an Albanian-language quarterly literary and cultural magazine published in Albania. It has been in circulation since 1996.

== History and profile ==
Mehr Licht! was established by Mira Meksi and Vebi Velija in 1996. Mira Meksi is also the editor-in-chief of the magazine which is published quarterly.

The title of the magazine is in German and refers to the last words of Goethe, meaning “more illumination, more knowledge, more reality.”

Mehr Licht! provides articles about literature and culture. The magazine is a member of the Eurozine, European network of literary magazines. In 2011 it started a prize for the best cultural essay written in Albania.

== See also ==
- List of magazines in Albania
