= Shaban Demiraj =

Albanian linguist (1920–2014)

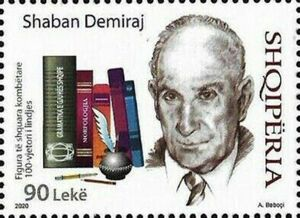
- Demiraj on a 2021 stamp of Albania
- Born: 1 January 1920; Vlorë, Albania
- Died: 30 August 2014 (aged 94)
- Citizenship: Albanian
- Occupations: Linguist, Albanologist

Shaban Demiraj (1 January 1920 – 30 August 2014) was an Albanian albanologist, linguist, professor at the University of Tirana from 1972–1990, and chairman of the Academy of Sciences of Albania during the period of 1993–1997.

== Life ==
Demiraj was born on 1 January 1920 in Vlorë. Despite financial difficulties and the lack of academic institutions in Albania, he managed to study and learn Latin, ancient Greek, and the major European languages. After completing his studies at the Madrasa of Tirana in 1939, he studied Albanian language in the two-year curriculum Pedagogical Institute, branch of Albanian language and literature (1946–1948), and later in the High Pedagogical Institute (1954–1955).

From 1948 to 1954, Demiraj worked as language and literature teacher in various high schools in Gjirokastër and Tirana. In 1954, he started working as a lector in the same High Pedagogical Institute from where he graduated, and later in the University of Tirana (UT), holding that position until 1990. From 1962 to 1989, he was in charge of the Albanian language chair, and from 1962 to 1966, he served as deputy dean of the Faculty of History and Philology of the UT.

Demiraj's areas of expertise were: the morphology of modern Albanian, Albanian historical grammar, the history of the Albanian writing (18th–19th centuries), and a special course on Balkan linguistics. In 1989, he became member of the Albanian Academy of Sciences, and was its chairman during 1993–97. Apart from his research publications, Demiraj also published many scientific articles inside Albania and abroad on topics as history of the Albanian language, grammar and phonetics, and Balkanology. He transcribed and adapted the work of Gabriele Dara Kënga e sprasme e Balës (The last song of Bala) in 1994. He also worked as a translator, having produced the Albanian edition of Martin Eden, a novel by Jack London, in 1959.

Demiraj was part of the committee that organized the Orthography Congress of 1972, Albanian: Kongresi i Drejtshkrimit, where the orthographic rules of the Albanian language were standardized, and he was also a signatory to the orthography.

He is the father of linguist Bardhyl Demiraj.

== Work ==
Some of his main works include:

- Demiraj, Shaban (1969). "Rreth disa problemeve të paskajores në gjuhën shqipe". Studime Filologjike (I).
- Çështje të sistemit emëror të gjuhës shqipe [Questions of the noun system of the Albanian language]. Pristina: Pristina University Press, 1972.
- Gramatikë historike e gjuhës shqipe. Tirana: Tirana University Press, 1986.
  - German translation: Austrian Academy of Sciences. Historische Grammatik der albanischen Sprache. Vienna: Verlag der Österreichischen Akademie der Wissenschaften, 1993.
- Gjuha shqipe dhe historia e saj [Albanian language and its history]. Tirana: Tirana University Press, 1988
  - Italian translation: La lingua albanese – origine, storia, strutture. Rende: Centro Editoriale e Librario, Università degli Studi della Calabria, 1997.
- Gjuhësi ballkanike [Balkanic linguistics]. Skopje: Logos-A 1994 (in Albanian and Macedonian), republished in Tirana in 2004
- Fonologjia historike e gjuhës shqipe (Historical phonology of the Albanian language), 1996
- Prejardhja e Shqiptarëve në dritën e dëshmive të gjuhës shqipe (Origin of the Albanians in the light of the Albanian language testimonies), 1999, a second edition in English as The Origin of the Albanians (linguistically investigated), 2006
- Eqrem Çabej (Eqrem Çabej), 1990
- Epiri, Pellazgët, Etruskët dhe Shqiptarët (Epirus, the Pelasgians, the Etruscans, and the Albanians), 2008.
- Gramatikë e gjuhës shqipe, vëll. I Morfologjia (Grammar of Albanian language, vol. I Morphology), 1976, other editions 1995, 2002, as editor and co-author.

== Awards ==
- "Mësues i Popullit" (People's Teacher).
- "Çmimi i Republikës i shkallës së parë" (First Grade Republic's Prize).
- "Çmimi i Republikës i shkallës së dytë" (Second Grade Republic's Prize), twice.
- "Mjeshtër i Madh i Punës" (Great Work Master) Order.
- "Honorary Citizenship" from Vlorë municipality

== See also ==
- Androkli Kostallari
- Eqerem Çabej
- Idriz Ajeti
- Mahir Domi
