= Mehdi Bardhi =

Kosovar linguist

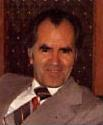
- Born: 14 September 1927; Prizren, Kingdom of Serbs, Croats and Slovenes
- Died: 3 April 1994 (aged 66); Pristina, FR Yugoslavia
- Education: University of Belgrade Faculty of Philosophy
- Occupations: Linguist, author and teacher

Mehdi Bardhi (14 September 1927 – 3 April 1994) was a Kosovar linguist, author, and teacher.

== Life ==
Bardhi was born in Prizren, Kingdom of Serbs, Croats and Slovenes. He completed his primary and secondary education in Prizren and Pristina. After working as a teacher during the immediate post-war period, he continued his studies within the University of Belgrade Faculty of Philosophy. His post-graduate studies were completed in the 50s in the same university in Belgrade, where he presented his degree on the subject of the specifics of the spoken language of Has region.

After completing his post-graduate studies in Belgrade, Prof. Mehdi Bardhi returns to work in Pristina, first at the Superior Pedagogical School and then at the Institute of Albanology in Pristina. He also worked as an Educational Counselor of the Institute of Education Advancement, Associate Professor of the Faculty of Philosophy in Pristina, Vice-President of the Pedagogical School in Prizren, Chief of Department of the Albanian language and literature of the Superior Pedagogical School of Pristina and the Faculty of Philosophy, and Dean of the Faculty of Philosophy, University of Pristina.

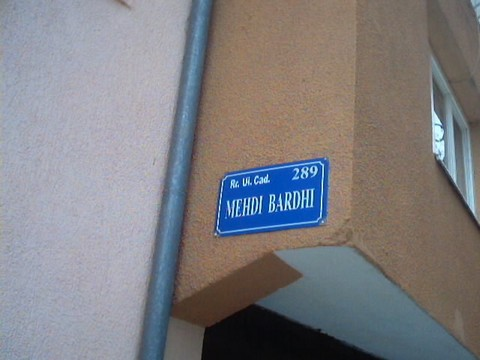
A street in Prizren named after Prof. Mehdi Bardhi.

At the University of Pristina, he has lectured on Albanian language subjects such as: Phonetics, Morphology, Syntax, Introduction to the Linguistics, History of the language, Lexicology and Old Textbooks.

During the academic year 1989/90, he was a visiting professor of the Albanian language in the Foreign Languages University in Beijing, China, where he published the book of Albanian grammar for Chinese students.

He was one of the original three founders of the Institute of Albanology in Pristina.

He was a board member of several magazines, such as: Advancement, Bulletin of Superior Pedagogical School of Pristina, Bulletin of Faculty of Philosophy, Gjurmime Albanologjike, Language Studies I – Dialectology, Studia Humanistica, International Seminar of the Albanian language, literature and culture. He was honored with the State Golden Medal for his lifetime work efforts.

Professor Bardhi authored and co-authored seventeen books and dictionaries, six academic brochures, over thirty published articles in scientific journals, seventeen translated books, collector of folkloric songs which were published by the Institute of Albanology, among others.

He died on 3 April 1994 in Pristina, FR Yugoslavia.

== Works ==
- Serbocroatian-Albanian Dictionary, Institute of Albanology, Pristina, 1974
- Albanian-Serbocroatian Dictionary, Institute of Albanology, Pristina, 1981
- Learn Albanian, Enti i Teksteve dhe i Mjeteve Mësimore i Krahinës Socialiste Autonome të Kosovës, 1986
- Foreign Words Dictionary
- Modernes albanisch im Selbststudium, Univ. Bibl., Auswertungsstelle für Ostsprachen, 1977, 366 pages
- Mësojmë shqip: për klasën VI të shkollës fillore, Enti i Teksteve dhe i Mjeteve Mësimore i Krahinës Socialiste Autonome të Kosovës, 1977
- Fjalor serbokroatisht shqip: Srpskohrvatsko albanski rečnik, Rilindja, 1989
- Ditët gazmore: libër leximi : për klasën V të shkollës fillore, Enti i Teksteve dhe i Mjeteve Mësimore i Krahinës Socialiste Autonome të Kosovës, 1985
- Zgjimi i jetës: libër leximi për klasen V të shkollës fillore, Enti i teksteve dhe i mjetevë mësimore i krakinës socialiste autonome të Kosovës, 1976, 165 pages
- Erë të mbarë "Shpend i kaltër", Rilindja, 1985
- Teksti i gjuhes shqipe per te huaj, 1974, 164 pages
- Učimo šiptarski: priručnik za učenike V i VI razreda osnovne škole sa srpskohrvatskim nastavnim jezikom, Zavod za izdavanje udžbenika Socijalističke Republike Srbije, 1963, 144 pages
- Teksti i gjuhës shqipe për të huaj, Univ. Bibliothek, 1977, 366 pages
