= Eqrem Çabej =

Albanian historical linguist (1908–1980)

- Born: 6 August 1908; Eskişehir, Ottoman Empire
- Died: 13 August 1980 (aged 72); Rome, Italy
- Occupations: Linguist, Albanologist, academic
- Years active: 1930–1980
- Known for: Albanian studies
- Awards: Honor of the Nation

Eqrem Çabej (Albanian pronunciation: [ˈɛcɾɛm tʃaˈbɛj]; 6 August 1908 – 13 August 1980) was an Albanian historical linguist and scholar who, through the publication of numerous studies gained a reputation as a key expert in research on Albanian language, literature, ethnology and linguistics.

== Educational background ==
Eqrem Çabej was born in Eskişehir, Hüdavendigâr vilayet and completed his elementary education in Gjirokastër, southern Albania, in 1921. He then left Albania, at the age of 12, and moved to Austria to continue his studies: first in St. Pölten then in Klagenfurt (1923–26), where he obtained his bachelor's degree. He went to University first in Graz (1927) and later in Vienna (1930–33). Attending lectures of renowned language scholars such as Paul Kretschmer, Karl Patsch, Nikolai Trubetzkoy, and Norbert Jokl, Çabej became interested in the historical development of the Albanian language. Before returning to Albania at the end of 1933, he submitted, at the University of Vienna, the Italoalbanische Studien (Italo-Albanian Studies in English) as his doctoral dissertation.

== Career as an educator and scholar ==
Home after a 13-year absence, the 25-year-old Çabej returned to Albania and spent five years as a secondary school teacher in: Shkodra, Elbasan, Gjirokastër and Tirana. After Albania's occupation by Mussolini's Italy on 7 April 1939, he was sent away from Albania and confined to Rome, Italy. In 1942, he received an invitation to join the newly formed Institute of Albanian Studies, which he declined, and, in 1943, was offered the position of minister of education in the government headed by Prime Minister Rexhep Mitrovica which he refused also. Returning to Albania in the spring of 1944, he continued to work as a teacher and, in 1947, was appointed as a researcher in Instituti i Shkencavet (The Institute of Sciences) in Tirana, the precursor institution of the University of Tirana. From 1952 to 1967, he served as a professor of the history of Albanian and historical phonology. In 1972, he became a founding member of Academy of Sciences of Albania. He worked as a researcher at the Institute of Linguistics and Literature in Tirana until the end of his life.

Çabej died in a clinic in Rome, Italy, a week after his 72nd birthday.

== Works and tributes ==
Among Eqrem Çabej's numerous works dealing with Albanian and its history include:

- Hyrje në historinë e gjuhës shqipe (Introduction to the History of the Albanian language; Tirana 1958; reprinted 2008)
- "Parashtesat e gjuhës shqipe" (Prefixes in Albanian) in collaboration with Aleksandër Xhuvani, 1956
- "Prapashtesat e gjuhës shqipe" (Suffixes in Albanian) in collaboration with Aleksandër Xhuvani, 1962
- "Die älteren Wohnsitze der Albaner auf der Balkanhalbinsel im Lichte der Sprache und der Ortsnamen" Atti dil VII Congresso Internazionale di Scienze Onomastiche 7, 1962: 241–251. (Reprinted in Albanian "Vendbanimi i hershëm i shqiptarëve në Gadishullin Ballkan në dritën e gjuhës e të emrave të vendeve." in Rexhep Ismajli, et al., eds., Studime Shqiptare: Vepra të zgjedhura Prishtinë, Akadëmia e Shkencave dhe e Artëve, 2008: 515–524.)
- "Meshari" i Gjon Buzukut (The Missal of Gjon Buzuku) a critical edition (Tirana 1962–68)
- "Einige Grundprobleme der alteren albanischen Sprachgeschichte," Studia Albanica 1 (1964): 69–89.
- Fonetika historike e shqipes (Historical Phonology of Albanian). Tirana 1968.
- Shumësi i singularizuar në gjuhën shqipe (The Singularized Plural in Albanian) 1967.
- "Mbi disa izoglosa të shqipes me sllavishten", Studime Filologjike 2 (1976): 63–74.
- Studime etimologjike në fushë të shqipes (Etymological Studies in Albanian). 7 vols. Tirana: Akademia et Shkencave e Republikës Popullore të Shqipërisë, Instituti i Gjuhësisë dhe i Letërsisë, 1976–2014.
  - Vol. II: A–B. – 1976, 617 p.;
  - Vol. I: Hyrje (Introduction) – 1982, 343 pages;
  - Vol. III: C–D. – 1987, 565 p.;
  - Vol. IV: Dh–J. – 1996, 624 p.;
  - Vol. VI: N–Rr. – 2002, 522 p.;
  - Vol. VII: S–Zh. – 2006, 434 p.;
  - Vol. V: K–M. – 2014, 478 pages – ISBN 978-99956-35-20-6)

His articles and monographs were collected into the 9-volume Studime gjuhësore (Linguistic Studies). Pristina: 1976–1977. The Eqrem Çabej University in Gjirokastër is named in his honor.

== See also ==
- Shaban Demiraj
- Androkli Kostallari
- Mahir Domi
- Idriz Ajeti
