= Albanological Institute of Pristina =

Albanian History institute in Kosovo

- Established: 1 June 1953; 73 years ago
- Historic Director: Rexhep Qosja
- Location: Rr. Eqrem Çabej p.n. 10.000, Prishtina, Kosovo
- Website: www.institutialbanologjik.org

Albanological Institute of Pristina (Albanian: Instituti Albanologjik i Prishtinës or Instituti Albanologjik – Prishtinë) is the main Institute of Albanology in Pristina, Kosovo. It is an independent public institution. Together with the Centre of Albanological Studies in Tirana, they represent the core scientific research centers on Albanology.

== History ==
The institute was founded on 1 June 1953, in Pristina, in Autonomous Region of Kosovo and Metohija of Yugoslavia. Initially, the staff consisted of four researchers (Ilhami Nimani, Selman Riza, Mehdi Bardhi, and Ali Rexha) and several external collaborators. The Yugoslav authorities terminated the project on 25 December 1955, since they failed to put its activities under censure. The UDBA secret services sequestered all materials.

In the 1960s, with the establishment of the University of Pristina, Albanological scholarship in Kosovo entered a new phase. The institute was reorganized on 28 February 1967, with a staff of five people. During the first decade of its activities, the institute made significant contributions across all fields of Albanology. Considerable effort was devoted to training new generations of researchers and collecting materials in folklore, ethnology, linguistics, and related fields. A library was established and enriched with a vast number of publications. From 1972 to 1981, the Albanological Institute was headed by Rexhep Qosja, who in 1971 became the first Doctor of Philological Sciences to defend a doctoral dissertation at the University of Pristina. With the increase in the number of staff and research fields, the institute moved in 1977 into its newly constructed building.

After 1981, with the denigration of the political autonomy of Kosovo, the institute was placed under censure and political control. At the same time, all cooperation with institutions and researchers from Albania was prohibited. Some major projects as Atlasi dialektologjik i të folmeve shqipe (Dialectical Atlas of the Albanian Speakings) and Leksikoni i shkrimtarëve shqiptarë (The lexicon of Albanian writers) remained unfinished.

Its work continued even during the turmoils of the '90s. On 8 March 1994, the Serbian police enter the building and dragged the employees outside, beaten and covered in blood. Nevertheless, the work continued in private establishments, until 1 April 1998, when an Albanian-Serbian agreement was reached with some international intermediation, and the building was restored to the institute.

As of 2015, the institute had 34 researchers and 15 administrative employees.

== Structure ==
The institute is structured in branches and sections:

1. Linguistics branch:
  1. Dialectology section
  2. Lexicography section
  3. Language Culture section
  4. Onomastics section
2. Literature branch:
  1. General section
3. Folklore branch:
  1. Folkloric literature section
  2. Ethno-musicology section
4. History branch
  1. History section
  2. Archaeology section
5. Ethnology branch

== Publishing ==
The periodicals consist of:

- Gjurmime Albanologjike (Albanological Reconnaissance) bulletin with 3 series:
  - Philological Sciences, ISSN 0351-2223.
  - Folklore and Ethnology, ISSN 0350-7998.
  - History Sciences, ISSN 0350-6258.

There are 41 issues of each series published so far. For a period of time, selected articles are published also in French in a special edition named Recherche Albanologique. From 2008, all the three series can be read online at the Central and Eastern European Online Library.

- Gjuha Shqipe (Albanian Language), practical-scientific magazine which focuses on applied linguistics and language culture. ISSN 0352-1109.

Both the periodicals above are published in cooperation with other Albanian and foreign researchers.

Special Editions comprise published projects, monographs, biographies, folkloric materials, etc. So far, there are over 500 titles published.

== See also ==
- University of Pristina
