= Academy of Albanological Studies =

Albanian History institute

Institutet e Albanologjisë
- Founder: Albanian Council of Ministers
- Established: August 22, 2007
- Location: Mother Teresa Square Nr.3, Tirana, Tirana, Albania
- Website: akad.gov.al

The Academy of Albanological Studies (AAS; Albanian: Akademia e Studimeve Albanologjike; stylised asa) is the main institution of albanology in Albania.

== History ==
The Academy of Albanological Studies started as part of the reconstruction and modernization of the Albanian academical and university system. The decision was taken by the Albanian Government in August 2007. It derived from joining the four existing institutions: Institute of Archaeology, Institute of Linguistics and Literature, Institute of History, and Institute of Cultural Anthropology and Art Studies, with two research units: Art Studies and Albanian Encyclopedia which used to belong Albanian Academy of Sciences.

The centre was reorganised on 10 March 2008 as a scientific research institute and received the status of the inter-university organ. It inherited the staff of specialist and a rich archive of a high importance. Along with the research in the fields of history, archaeology, cultural anthropology, art study, linguistics, literature, etc., part of its work focus is the investigation, evaluation, conservation, and promotion of the material and spiritual inheritance of the Albanian culture, both past and present. It is one of the core albanology institutes in overall. It also offers master and PhD courses and studies on all the fields that the institute covers.

== Institutes ==
=== Institute of Archaeology ===
The scientific work on archaeology in Albanian started after World War II, when all the cultural and historical valuable entities were placed under state protection. The first institution of this nature was the Archaeological-Ethnographic Museum (Albanian: Muzeu Arkeologjik-Etnografik), established in Tirana in 1948. With the establishment of the Institute of History and Linguistics in 1955, an Archaeology Section was also created. It handled archaeological research and studies countrywide. In 1976, the section was transformed into the Centre of Archaeological Research (Albanian: Qendra e Kërkimeve Arkeologjike), as part of the Academy of Sciences, with threes scientific sectors: prehistory, Illyrian antiquity, and Middle Ages. Eight scientific groups were established in various towns of the country. In 1992, the centre gained the "institute" status and became the Institute of Archaeology.

Its main activities consist of excavations and archaeological studies throughout the Albanian territory, and the scientific and methodical direction of the archaeologic museum that it has under its jurisdiction, in Tirana, Durrës, Apollonia, Butrint, and Korçë. Structurally, the institute contains the following departments: Department of Prehistory, Department of Antiquity, and Department of Late Antiquity and Middle Age.

Directors:

- Selim Islami 1955–1966
- Muzafer Korkuti 1967–1976
- Aleksandra Mano 1976–1982
- Muzafer Korkuti 1982–1990
- Neritan Ceka 1990–1993
- Namik Bodinaku 1993–1997
- Muzafer Korkuti 1997–

Periodicals:

- Iliria (Illyria) magazine, OCLC 2661500.
- Separate section in other periodicals:
  - Studime Historike magazine of the Institute of History.
  - Studia Albanica magazine of the Albanian Academy of Sciences, ISSN 0585-5047.
  - Monumentet (The monuments) of the Albanian Institute of Monuments, OCLC 3460148.
  - Other special publications from conferences, congresses, convents, etc.

=== Institute of Linguistics and Literature ===
The institute traces its origin in the Institute of Albanian Studies of April 1940. In 1946, the Institute of Scientific Research (Albanian: Instituti i Kërkimeve Shkencore) took over, and was renamed in 1948 to Institute of Sciences (Albanian: Instituti i Shkencave). As its activity spread, it split in 1955 as the Institute of History and Linguistics. In 1972, the history and linguistics-literature section split, each creating its own institute as part of the Academy of Sciences.

The main objective of its scientific-research work is the Albanian language and literature. In the field of linguistics, the institute focuses on studying the Albanian dialects, their current status and historical transgression, compilation of scientific grammars, technical terminology dictionaries, study on standard Albanian language, language norms, and language-related culture. In the field of literature, it focuses on studying the historical development of the Albanian literature, bibliographies on the life and work of its prominent protagonists, compilation of generalizing literary-historical work, and scientific-critical publications on the classics of the Albanian literary tradition.

The archive conserved manuscripts on the old Albanian texts, documentary materials, and monographs on linguistic and literary-historical works, published or not. The library conserved over 50,000 volumes and a huge number of periodical issues. The file archive contains 3 million lexical files.

Directors:

- Androkli Kostallari 1972–1990
- Jorgo Bulo 1990–1993
- Bahri Beci 1993–1997
- Jorgo Bulo 1997–

Periodicals:

- Studime Filologjike (Philological Studies), quarterly, ISSN 0563-5780
- Gjuha Jonë (Our Language), quarterly, ISSN 1728-4813

=== Institute of history ===
The institute started as a scientific-research institute in 1972. The first attempts for establishing such institute had started in April 1940. After World War II, the Institute of Albanian Studies (Albanian: Instituti i Studimeve Shqiptare), was established in 1946, comprising the sections of history and sociology. Other departments were added on the way: archaeology, ancient history, medieval history, recent history, medieval art, ethnography, and other linguistic-literary sections which were all included under the Institute of History and Linguistics (Albanian: Instituti i Historisë e i Gjuhësisë) in 1955. With the establishment of the University of Tirana (UT) in 1957, the institute was placed under UT's umbrella. With the establishment of the Academy of Sciences in 1972, the sections related to history went apart and formed the Institute of History. During the 70s the section of ethnography and archaeology split from it and became independent parallel institutes.

The institute's main focus is on:

- Studying the history of the Albanian people inside and outside the territory of Albania, from antiquity till today.
- Preparation and publishing of documentary collections, articles, and monographs.
- Organization of scientific activities as symposiums, round tables, workshops, and conferences for presenting the history of the political, socioeconomic, cultural, and diplomatic events of Albania in Balkanic, European, and wider perspective.
- Lecturing in various universities in Albania, diploma and PhD thesis recenses.

Its main activities dedicate the departmental structure as well, based on epochs:

- History of Albanian people in medieval times.
- Albanian under Ottoman Empire (16th–18th centuries).
- Albanian National Awakening.
- Independent Albanian State (1913–1939).
- History of National Liberation War (World War II).
- Albania during the Communist regime (1944–1990).
- History of ethnic Albania and diaspora.

The institute contains a huge archive of documents and monographs, most of them provided by foreign archives worldwide. Its library contains 70,000 copies of books and magazines on Albannological studies, the second in Albania after the National Library.

Directors:

- Stefanaq Pollo 1972–1989
- Selami Pulaha 1989–1990
- Kristaq Prifti 1990–1993
- Kasem Bicoku 1993–1997
- Ana Lalaj 1997–2005
- Marenglen Verli 2005–

Periodicals:

- Buletini i Shkencave (Bulletin of Sciences) magazine, before being restructured in 1957 as:
  - Buletini i Universitetit të Tiranës [Seria e Shkencave Shoqërore] (Bulletin of the University of Tirana [Social Sciences Series]) magazine, before being restructured in 1964 as:
    - Studime Historike (Historical Studies) magazine, currently quarterly, ISSN 0563-5799.
- Kosova (Kosovo) magazine.

=== Institute of Cultural Anthropology and Art Studies ===
The institute started in 1979 as a merge project between the Institute of Folklore and the Ethnography section of the Institute of History. It was under the umbrella of the Academy of Sciences and was named Institute of Folkloric Culture (Albanian: Instituti i Kulturës Popullore). The Institute of Folklore itself had started in 1961, based on the Folklore Section of the former "Institute of Studies" (Alb: Instituti i Studimeve) of 1947. The Ethnography Section was established in 1947 as well. In 2008, a special structure focusing in art studies was added, thus resulting in the current "Institute of Cultural Anthropology and Art Studies".

Its activity covers field research, collection, registration of different genres of ethno-folklore, archiving and filing, studies, publication of periodicals and scientific resumes, publishing of monographs and collections of materials, illustrative publishing, and in particular publishing the "Albanian Cultural Heritage" series.

In the beginning, its work focused on collecting the Albanian material cultural pieces in the terrain. It built a collection of songs, dances, musical instruments, prose and poetry, etc. As a result, the first six archives were created: the archive of the objects and material culture, the archive of written ethnography, photothèque, sketch archive, archive of music, and the written folklore archive. The archive of the objects and material culture conserves about 33,000 objects representing various aspects of life such as agriculture, animal husbandry, crafts, folkloric art, traditional dresses, ornaments, work tools, etc. The archive of written ethnography conserves material noted by the researches during expeditions, materials and notes provided by the foreign collaborators, translations from the original materials of former travelers and researches during their expedition in Albania, etc. The photothèque conserves over 22,000 photo negatives and dispositives in different media depicting traditional dresses since the start of the 20th century, fragments from work, various ceremonies, folkloric activities, etc. The sketch archive conserves over 3500 sketches and planimetries of traditional home environments and constructions. The music archive conserves over 35,000 songs, melodies, dances, and ceremonials, while the archive of written folklore conserves over 1.5 million verses, and around 200,000 pages of folkloric prose.

Another field of its activity is the organisation of folkloric activities, the establishment of the ethnography museums, and ethnographic exhibits. A considerable number of exhibits have been gone through in Greece, Romania, Hungary, Italy, France, Austria, Nordic countries, former Soviet Union countries, China, etc.

Directors:

- Zihni Sako 1961–1979
- Alfred Uçi 1979–1988
- Ali Xhiku 1988–1993
- Beniamin Kruta 1993–1995
- Agron Xhagolli 1995–1999
- Afërdita Onuzi 1999–

Periodicals:

- Etnografia Shqiptare (Albanian Ethnography), started in 1962. ISSN 0425-466X. It publishes researches and studies. 18 volumes published so far.
- Kultura Popullore (Folkloric Culture), semiannual, started in 1980. ISSN 0257-6082.
- Çështje të folklorit shqiptar (Albanian Folklore Topics), collections, started in 1982. Covers problematic topics, studies and approaches on folkloric prose, poetry, music, dance, instruments, etc. OCLC 15404050.

== Academic Senate ==
The Academic Senate as of 2015:

- Ardian Marashi
- Beqir Meta
- Miaser Dibra
- Valter Memishaj
- Shpresa Gjongecaj
- Adem Bunguri
- Ferid Hudhri
- Shaban Sinani
- Marenglen Verli
- Arben Skënderi
- Raimond Perolla
- Sali Kodrija

== See also ==
- List of universities in Albania
- Quality Assurance Agency of Higher Education
- Albanological Institute of Pristina
- University of Tirana
- Royal Institute of the Albanian Studies
- Education in Albania
