= List of Albanian folklorists =

This is a list of Albanian folklorists.

== Folklorists ==
- Mehdi Bardhi (1927–1994)
- Anton Berisha (born 1946)
- Tahir Dizdari (1900–1972)
- Visar Dodani (1857–1939)
- Nikollë Filja (1691–1769)
- Shtjefën Gjeçovi (1874–1929)
- Karl Gurakuqi (1895–1971)
- Petro Janura (1911–1983)
- Zef Jubani (1818–1880)
- Sotir Kolea (1872–1945)
- Donat Kurti (1903–1983)
- Thimi Mitko (1820–1890)
- Bernardin Palaj (1894–1947)
- Gjergj Pekmezi (1872–1938)
- Girolamo de Rada (1814–1903)
- Giuseppe Schirò (1865–1927)
- Shefqet Pllana (1918–1994)
- Dhimitër Shuteriqi (1915–2003)
- Ramadan Sokoli (1920–2008)
- Tonin Çobani (born 1947)
