= Albanian epic poetry =

Form of epic poetry

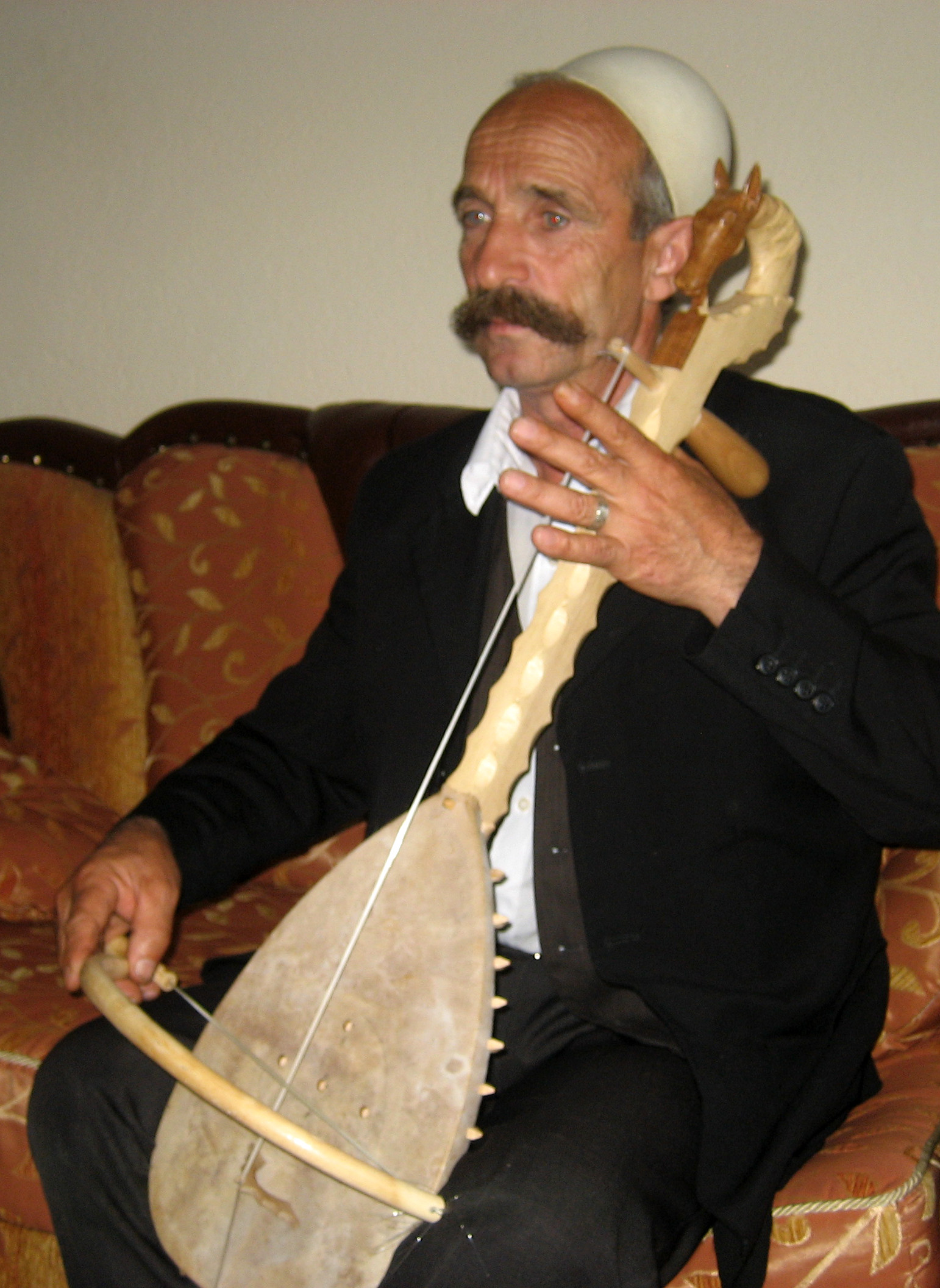
Albanian lahutar ("rhapsode" or "bard") Isë Elezi-Lekëgjekaj from Rugova, singing to the accompaniment of the lahutë. He is considered one of the most important and acclaimed living practitioners of this oral epic tradition.

Albanian epic poetry is a form of epic poetry created by the Albanian people. It consists of a longstanding oral tradition still very much alive. A good number of Albanian epic singers (Albanian: lahutarë or rapsodë, 'bards' or 'rhapsodes') can be found today in Kosovo and northern Albania, and some also in Montenegro. The Albanian traditional singing of epic verse from memory is one of the last survivors of its kind in modern Europe, and the last survivor of the Balkan traditions.

Albanian epic poetry has been analysed by Homeric scholars to acquire a better understanding of Homeric epics. The long oral tradition that has sustained Albanian epic poetry reinforces the idea that pre-Homeric epic poetry was oral. The theory of oral-formulaic composition was developed also through the scholarly study of Albanian epic verse.

Northern Albanian epic poetry is performed singing to the accompaniment of the lahutë or çifteli. Within the Albanian epic poetry, Kângë Kreshnikësh constitute the most important heroic non-historical cycle, while the songs of Skanderbeg form the most important historical cycle.

== Documentation ==
Albanian traditions have been handed down orally across generations. They have been preserved through traditional memory systems that have survived intact into modern times in Albania, a phenomenon that is explained by the lack of state formation among Albanians and their ancestors – the Illyrians, being able to preserve their "tribally" organized society. This distinguished them from civilizations such as Ancient Egypt, Minoans and Mycenaeans, who underwent state formation.

Albanian myths and legends have been written down since the period of the oldest Albanian literary works (from the 15th century onwards), but the systematic collection of Albanian customs and folklore material began only in the 19th century.

=== 19th century ===
During the 19th century many foreign scholars took interest in Albanian folklore. The first writer to mention Albanian heroic songs was Lord Byron in his Childe Harold's Pilgrimage (1812–1818). In 1830 Vuk Karadžić recorded from Dovica Obadović from Đurakovac near Peć 12 Albanian songs and one riddle for Jernej Kopitar. This collection constitutes one of the earliest written records of Albanian oral verse from Kosovo. The complete collection was first published by Norbert Jokl. The extracts of songs of this collection seems to be based on historical or legendary events. The collection contains heroic and lyric songs, including also laments.

The Albanian national awareness is likely to have been a source of the motivation to record the songs. In the late 19th century, Romanticism in Europe and in particular in Eastern Europe triggered a desire to cultivate and solidify national cultural identities. Thus, importance was placed on the Albanian epic verse because of the cultural history it contains. When in Italy the interest in folklore prevailed, the Arbëreshë writers were among the first to take the opportunity to make known their culture and folklore. In 1847, Vincenzo Dorsa published in Naples Su gli Albanesi, ricerche e pensieri, which contains three Albanian poems translated into Italian. The songs were from the villages of Calabria. German physician Karl H. Reinhold was the first collector of Albanian songs in Greece, who recorded Albanian folk poems from the Greco-Albanian sailors from the islands of Poros and Hydra while he was serving as a doctor in the Greek navy. He published his collection in Noctes Pelasgicae (Pelasgic Nights, with the term "Pelasgic" meaning Albanian) in 1855.

An important Arbëresh publisher of Albanian folklore was the linguist Demetrio Camarda, who included in his 1866 Appendice al Saggio di grammatologia comparata (Appendix to the Essay on the Comparative Grammar) a great number of Albanian songs from Sicily and Calabria, some folk poems from Albania proper and a few from Albanian settlements in Greece. In this collection there are some Arbëresh epic songs. Arbëresh writer Girolamo De Rada, who was already imbued with a passion for his Albanian lineage in the first half of the 19th century, began collecting folklore material at an early age. De Rada published in 1866 the collection Rapsodie di un poema albanese (Rhapsodies of an Albanian Poem), which consists of 72 epic poems from the colonies of Napolitano, with also the Italian translation. The rhapsodies are divided into three parts: "Gli Albanesi allo stato libero" with 20 songs; "Gli Albanesi in guerra col Turco" with 20 songs; "Gli Albanesi vinti ed in esilio" with 32 songs. However, there is some doubt about the complete originality of this collection, since he himself admitted to have made a few changes in it.

Stimulated by the collections of the Arbëreshë writers and foreigners, the interest of native Albanians in collecting Albanian oral creations grow with the Albanian National Awakening (Rilindja) in the second half of the 19th century. The first Albanian collector of oral epic songs from Albania proper was Zef Jubani. From 1848 he served as interpreter to French consul in Shkodra, Louis Hyacinthe Hécquard, who was very interested in folklore and decided to prepare a book on northern Albanian oral tradition. They travelled through the northern Albanian mountains and recorded folklore material which were published in French translation in the 1858 Hécquard's pioneering Histoire et description de la Haute Albanie ou Guégarie (History and Description of High Albania or Gegaria”). This collection contains twelve songs in French, without the original Albanian, which were lost later in the flood that devastated the city of Shkodra on 13 January 1866. Jubani published in 1871 the original Albanian songs with Italian translation in the collection Raccolta di canti popolari e rapsodie di poemi albanesi (Collection of Albanian Folk Songs and Rhapsodies), which constitutes the first collection of Geg folk songs and the first folkloristic work to be published by an Albanian who lived in Albania. This collection contains also a number of poems sung in Shkodra.

One of the best collections of Albanian oral tradition is Alvaniki melissa – Belietta Sskiypetare (The Albanian Bee) published in Alexandria by Thimi Mitko in the year 1878. Mitko compiled and classified the material according to genres. The most important part of this collection are the lyric poems. It contains 123 heroic songs, 97 in the Tosk dialect and 26 in the Gheg dialect of Albanian. They celebrate the battles of the Albanians in the different parts of the Ottoman Empire, including the heroic deeds of beys and those of the Souliotes.

=== 20th century ===
An important collection of Albanian epic poems was published by Michele Marchianò in Canti popolari albanesi delle colonie d'Italia in 1908. The poems of this collections maintain exactly the original form as they were found in a 1737 manuscript. In 1911 and 1912 he also published Canti popolari albanesi della Capitanata e del Molise in Rivista d'Apulia. K. D. Sotiriou published in 1909 the collection "Short Songs and Tales of the Albanians" written in the Arvanitika dialect of the village of Markopulo in Attica and the island of Spetses. In 1923 Giuseppe Schirò published the remarkable collection Canti tradizionali ed altri saggi delle colonie albanesi di Sicilia.

Franciscan priests and scholars active in the northern Albanian mountains recorded Northern Albanian epic songs in the early decades of the 20th century by. Among the most important Albanian folklorists were Shtjefën Gjeçovi, Bernardin Palaj and Donat Kurti, who collected folk songs on their travels through the mountains and wrote articles on Gheg Albanian folklore and tribal customs. Palaj and Kurti published in 1937—on the 25th anniversary of Albanian independence—the most important collection of Albanian epic verse, Kângë kreshnikësh dhe legenda (The Songs of the Frontier Warriors and Legends), in the series called Visaret e Kombit (The Treasures of the Nation).

Harvard Scholars Milman Parry and Albert Bates Lord began to explore the traditional Albanian songs, seeking to uncover how the Homeric epics were composed. In order to answer that question, they sought to illuminate and study first-hand the extant oral traditions. This led them to the mountainous regions of the Balkans, where reciters of the ancient songs were still around. Up until this point, documentation of any oral verse had been done by hand. Recording by hand caused the documentation to be done in an unnatural manner. Lord's remarkable collection of over 100 songs containing about 25,000 verses is now preserved in the Milman Parry Collection at Harvard University.

=== 21st century ===
A considerable amount of work has been done in the last decades. Led for many years by Anton Çeta and Qemal Haxhihasani, Albanologists published multiple volumes on epic, with research carried out by scholars like Rrustem Berisha, Anton Nikë Berisha, and Zymer Ujkan Neziri. Until the beginning of the 21st century, there have been collected about half a million verses of the Kreshnikësh cycle (a number that also includes variations of the songs). 23 songs containing 6,165 verses from the collection of Palaj and Kurti were translated into English by Robert Elsie and Janice Mathie-Heck, who in 2004 published them in the book Songs of the Frontier Warriors (Këngë Kreshnikësh). In 2021 Nicola Scaldaferri and his collaborators Victor Friedman, John Kolsti and Zymer U. Neziri published Wild Songs, Sweet Songs: The Albanian Epic in the Collections of Milman Parry and Albert B. Lord. Providing a complete catalogue of Albanian texts and recordings collected by Parry and Lord with a selection of twelve of the most remarkable songs in Albanian including the English translations, the book represents an authoritative guide to one of the most important collections of Balkan folk epic in existence.

== Performance ==
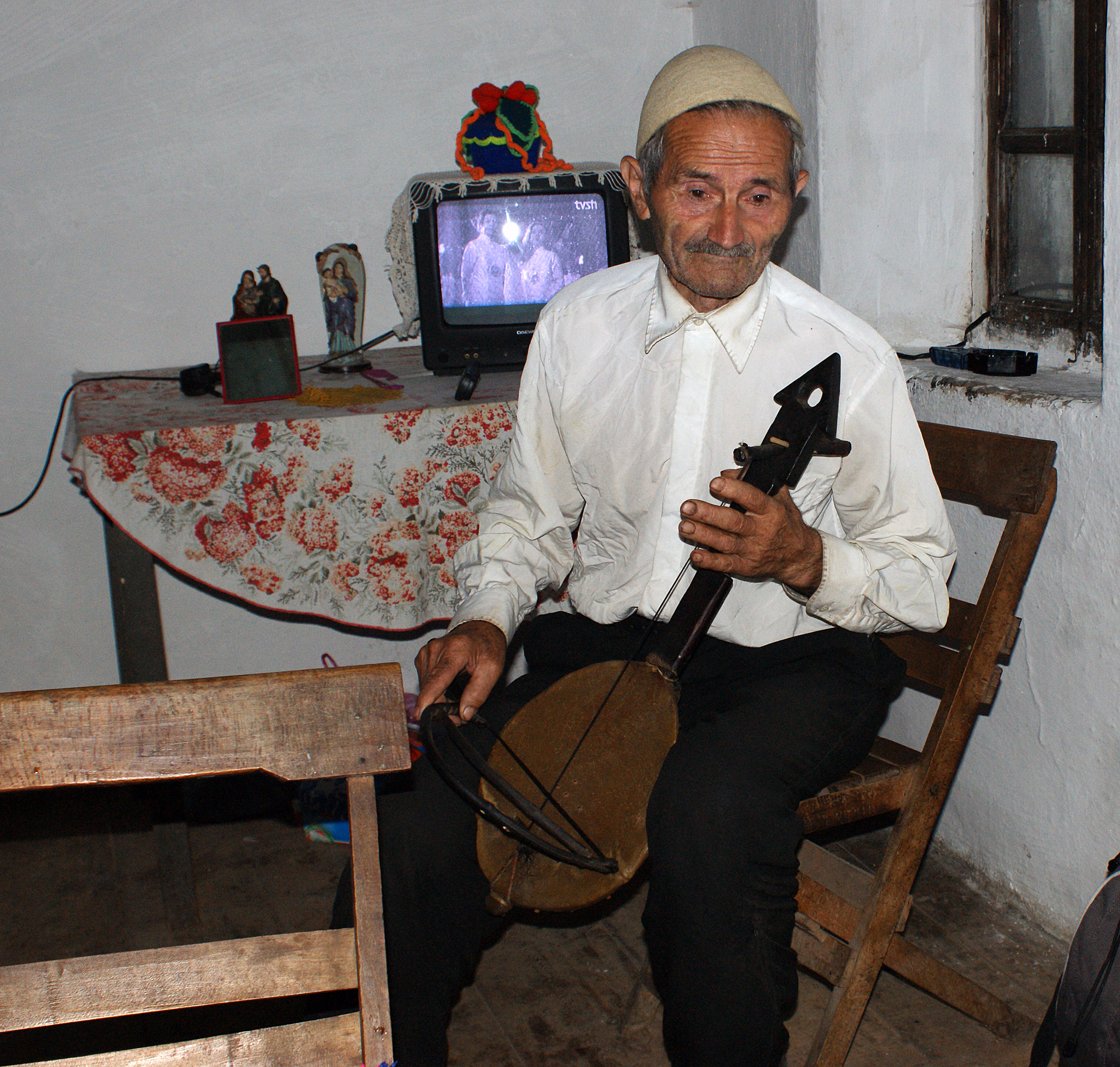
Lahutar in Shala, northern Albania

Today, the Albanian heroic non-historical cycle – Kângë Kreshnikësh – is still sung by elderly men called lahutars, who sing while playing a one-stringed instrument called a lahuta or gusle. Many lahutars can be found in Kosovo (where the majority of the population is Albanian), northern Albania, and some in Montenegro. These men are considered to be the last traditional, European singers of epic verse.

Oral epics are "performance traditions", fundamentally a complex communication of emotion, culture, and history that imbue meaning by more than written text. Because of this, these songs are not done justice by a simple transcription. A by-product of transcription is the song cannot be performed the whole way through, it must stop and start to allow the transcriber to write what they hear. Luckily, Parry and Lord were researching at the right time and had support from the right people. Doing research for Harvard, the wound up in the Balkans with audio recorders, which made the process of recording the epic verse easier and yielded a product truer to the real performance.

=== Accompanying instruments ===
The Northern Albanian epic poetry is performed singing to the accompaniment of the lahutë or çifteli.

Lahuta is a one-stringed musical instrument with a long neck and oval shaped body. It consists of a sound box made of carved wood (usually maple as it is considered as the best material) covered with an animal skin, and a long neck which is decorated at the top, usually with the head of a goat, a ram or a horse. The string of the Lahuta is made of horsehair. The instrument is held vertically between the knees, with the left hand fingers on the neck. It is played with a bow pulled over the string which is never pressed to the neck, creating a dramatic and sharp sound, expressive and difficult to master. In singing, the voice follows the harmonic and unique sound produced by the instrument.

Çiftelia is a plucked two-stringed musical instrument with a long neck and oval shaped body. It is most often tuned to B_{3} and E_{3} (comparable to the top two strings of a guitar, which is classically tuned as "E_{2} A_{2} D_{3} G_{3} B_{3} E_{4}"). One string carries the melody, the other is usually played as a drone.

== The Highland Lute ==
The Albanian national epic poem The Highland Lute (Albanian: Lahuta e Malcís) was written by Albanian Catholic friar Gjergj Fishta and published in 1937. It consists of 30 songs and over 17,000 verses. The poem has been inspired by northern Albanian oral epic poetry.

== Scholarship ==
Albanian epic verse is a longstanding Balkan tradition that, unlike most known similar oral traditions, is still alive today. Albanian folk poetry is so rich with ancient motifs that it can shed light on the mythology of the pagan ancestors of the Albanians, as well as on the comparative mythology of the old and new peoples of the Balkans. Albanian folk poetry can also contribute to the solution of Homeric problems. In particular, Albanian epic poetry has been analysed to acquire a better understanding of the creation of the Homeric epics, and the long orality that has sustained the Albanian tradition reinforces the idea that pre-Homeric epic poetry was oral. Albanian epic verse has been studied to develop the theory of oral-formulaic composition.

Due to the Albanian language barrier, this tradition has lacked substantial international scholarship, translation, and recognition as an important source of cultural history. Albanian literature as a whole is an under-translated and understudied material, relative to similar academic areas. This can be attributed to a few large reasons. First, the language barrier: Albanian is an Indo-European language, though dissimilar to all other modern languages. It maintains many archaic structures and its closest relative would be the very ancient Balto-Slavic languages. Dacian and Illyrian seem to be close relatives, predecessors, or ancestors. The second impediment to scholarship of the Albanian literature is its political history. Under tight control by Stalinist leaders in the second half of the 20th century, Albania was effectively isolated from the rest of the world. The closed borders kept out outsiders and kept in Albanians who wished to leave, cutting off external study, contact, and heavily impeded the development of substantive cultural exchange and research. Albanian's lack of representation in the world literary scene is not due to quality, but to dearth of external interest and difficulty of access.

=== Non-English-language scholars of Albanian epic poetry ===
- Matthias Murko (1861–1952)
- Gerhard Gesemann (1888–1948)
- Fulvio Cordignano (1887–1952)
- Maximilian Lambertz (1882–1963)
- Joesf Matl (1897–1972)
- Alois Schmaus (1901–1970)
- Maximilian Braun (1903–1984)
- Walther Wünsch (1908–1991)
- Agnija Vasiljevna Desnickaja (1912–1992)

=== English-language scholars of Albanian epic poetry ===
- Baron Edward Bulwer-Lytton (1803–1873)
- Laza Kostić (1841–1910)
- Hector Munro Chadwick (1870–1947)
- Nora Kershaw Chadwick (1891–1972)
- Milman Parry (1902–1935)
- Clarence Manning (1893–1972)
- Albert Lord (1912–1991)
- Anne Pennington (1934–1981)
- John Miles Foley (1947–2012)

== See also ==
- Albanian folk beliefs
- The File on H, a novel by Ismail Kadare about two Irish researchers engaging with the Albanian epic tradition in the 1930s

== Sources ==
=== Bibliography ===
- Blum, Stephen (2023). Music Theory in Ethnomusicology. Oxford theory in ethnomusicology. Oxford University Press. ISBN 9780199303526.
- Broughton, Simon; Ellingham, Mark; Trillo, Richard (1999). World Music: Africa, Europe and the Middle East. Rough Guides. p. 2. ISBN 9781858286358.
- Di Lellio, Anna; Dushi, Arbnora (2024). "Gender Performance and Gendered Warriors in Albanian Epic Poetry". In Lothspeich, Pamela (ed.). The Epic World. Routledge Worlds. Taylor & Francis. ISBN 9781000912203.
- Dushi, Arbnora (May 2014). "On Collecting and Publishing the Albanian Oral Epic". Approaching Religion. 4: 37–44. doi:10.30664/ar.67535.
- Elmer, David (2013). "The Milman Parry Collection of Oral Literature". Oral Tradition. 28 (2): 341–354. doi:10.1353/ort.2013.0020. hdl:10355/65316. S2CID 162892594.
- Elsie, Robert (1994). Albanian Folktales and Legends. Naim Frashëri Publishing Company. Archived from the original (pdf) on 28 July 2009.
- Elsie, Robert (2001b). Albanian Folktales and Legends. Dukagjini Publishing House.
- Elsie, Robert; Mathie-Heck, Janice (January 2004). Songs of the Frontier Warriors. Bolchazy-Carducci Publishers. ISBN 978-0-86516-412-3.
- Elsie, Robert (2010). Historical Dictionary of Albania (PDF). Historical Dictionaries of Europe. Vol. 75 (2 ed.). Scarecrow Press. p. 255. ISBN 978-0810861886. Archived from the original (PDF) on 6 October 2014.
- Elsie, Robert (2001a). A Dictionary of Albanian Religion, Mythology and Folk Culture. London: Hurst & Company. ISBN 1-85065-570-7.
- Elsie, Robert (2005). Albanian Literature: A Short History. I.B.Tauris. ISBN 978-1-84511-031-4.
- Elsie, Robert (2007). "The Rediscovery of folk literature in Albania" (PDF). In Marcel Cornis-Pope; John Neubauer (eds.). History of the literary cultures of East-Central Europe: junctures and disjunctures in the 19th and 20th centuries. Vol. III. Amsterdam & Philadelphia: John Benjamins. pp. 335–338. ISBN 978-90-272-3455-1.
- Elsie, Robert (2014). "Why Is Albanian Epic Verse So Neglected?" (PDF). Paper Presented at the International Conference on the Albanian Epic of Legendary Songs in Five Balkan Countries: Albania, Kosova, Macedonia, Serbia and Montenegro. Pristina: Institute of Albanian Studies.
- Elsie, Robert. "Oral Verse". albanianliterature.net. Archived from the original on 9 October 2017.
- Gadamer, Hans-Georg (2013) [1989]. Truth and Method (revised second ed.). Bloomsbury. ISBN 9781780936581.
- Galaty, Michael L. (2018). Memory and Nation Building: From Ancient Times to the Islamic State. Rowman & Littlefield. ISBN 9780759122628.
- Ling, Jan (1997). "Narrative Song in the Balkans". A History of European Folk Music. University Rochester Press. ISBN 978-1-878822-77-2.
- Lloyd, A. L. (1968). "Albanian Folk Song". Folk Music Journal. 1 (4): 205–222. JSTOR 4521791.
- Neziri, Zymer U. (2001). Xhevat Syla (ed.). Këngë të kreshnikëve. Libri Shkollor.
- Neziri, Zymer U. (2008). Institute of Albanology of Prishtina (ed.). Studime për folklorin: Epika gojore dhe etnokultura [The Study of Folklore: The Oral Epic and Ethnoculture]. Vol. II. Grafobeni.
- Neziri, Zymer U.; Scaldaferri, Nicola (2016). From the Archive to the Field: New Research on Albanian Epic Songs. Singers and Tales in the 21st Century; The Legacies of Milman Parry and Albert Lord. Washington DC: Center for Hellenic Studies..
- Preminger, Alex (1975). "Albanian Poetry". Princeton Encyclopaedia of Poetry and Poetics (enlarged ed.). London and Basingstoke: Macmillan Press. pp. 8–9. ISBN 9781349156177.
- Ruches, Pyrrhus J. (1967). Albanian Historical Folksongs 1716-1943. A Survey of Oral Epic Poetry from Southern Albania with Orig. Texts Coll. and Transl. Argonaut.
- Samson, Jim (2013). Music in the Balkans. Brill. ISBN 978-90-04-25038-3.
- Scaldaferri, Nicola, ed. (2021). Wild Songs, Sweet Songs: The Albanian Epic in the Collections of Milman Parry and Albert B. Lord. Publications of the Milman Parry Collection of Oral Literature Series. Vol. 5. In collaboration with Victor Friedman, John Kolsti, Zymer U. Neziri. Harvard University, Center for Hellenic Studies. ISBN 9780674271333.
- Skendi, Stavro (1954). Albanian and South Slavic Oral Epic Poetry. Philadelphia: American Folklore Society. OCLC 3794368.
- Sokoli, Ramadan (2013) [1999]. "The Albanian World in the Folk Teller's Stories". In Margaret Read MacDonald (ed.). Traditional Storytelling Today: An International Sourcebook. Translated by Pranvera Xhelo. Routledge. ISBN 9781135917142.
- Tarifa, Fatos (2008). "Of Time, Honor, and Memory: Oral Law in Albania" (PDF). Oral Tradition. 23 (1): 3–14. doi:10.1353/ort.0.0017.
