= Gjergj Elez Alia =

Legendary hero in literature of Bosnia and Albania

Gjergj Elez Alia or Đerzelez Alija is a legendary character found in the epic poetry and literature of Northern Albania, Kosovo, Bosnia and Herzegovina, and Gora. The legendary character is believed to have been a popular Muslim epic hero of the Bosnian Krajina (frontier region) from the end of the 15th century. In the Albanian tradition, however, the figure is associated with an older layer of legendary epic poetry containing pre-Christian elements and themes linked to Albanian paganism. He is one of the well known legendary heroes and a symbol of brotherly loyalty to both the Bosniaks and Albanians, and typically features as a secondary character in the folk poetry of the Serbs.

== Name ==
The name of the legendary character is spelled in Albanian: Gjergj Elez Alia, in Bosnian: Đerzelez Alija or Đerđelez Alija, in Hungarian: Gerz Ilyas, in Serbo-Croatian: Ђерзелез Алија, Đerzelez Alija, in Turkish: Gürz Ilyas.

The name Gürz is derived from the Turkish word gürzi (mace) and means warrior with the mace. The name Gjergj is the Albanian rendering of George, which is pronounced by Bosniaks the same way as in Albanian, but spelled as Đerđ/Djerdj in Bosnian. The name Gjergjelez has therefore been explained as a compound of Gjergj and Elez, the latter corresponding to the name of the prophet Iliaz (Elias). The tripartite-compound names such as in the case of Gjergj Elez Alia are typically found in northern Albanian tribes as well as in some southern Albanian mountain peoples.

The different bases which form the foundation of the name in both Albanian and South Slavic tradition - Gjergj/Xherxh, Gjer/Xher, Gerg, Ger - are of Albanian linguistic origin and serve as evidence of the inherent Albanian stratum in these songs. The third part of the compound name, Ali, is an Ottoman Turkish name of Arabic origin, meaning "high, noble", which is used to highlight a peculiar trait of this legendary character.

== Historical background ==
It is believed by some scholars that the legendary figure of Gjergj Elez Alia was inspired by Gerz-Iljas (alternatively Gürz Ilyas), who first appears in Ottoman registries as a landowner in 1455. Gerz-Iljas is again recorded as a landowner in the defter of 1485, with his timar (land grant) being situated in the nahiya of Dobrun near Višegrad. In the account of Ottoman chronicler Ibn Kemal, Gerz-Iljas was mentioned as a hero in the fighting of the Bosnian borderland in the years 1479-1480, having saved Gazi Husrev Bey and rescuing him from defeat. There is a turbe (mausoleum) in the village of Gerzovo (near Mrkonjić Grad, Bosnia and Herzegovina) which according to legend is his burial place.

The legendary character is therefore believed to have been a popular Muslim epic hero of the Bosnian Krajina (frontier region) from the end of the 15th century. The myth of Gjergj Elez Ali has its roots in the origins of common beliefs and a set of interests linked to the preservation of the lineage. This was accomplished by the Bosniaks through religion, and by the Albanians through language. As such, he is a well known legendary hero and a symbol of fraternal loyalty to both the Bosniaks and Albanians. In the Albanian tradition, however, the song preserves a substantially older layer of legendary epic poetry. Its undefined setting, pre-Christian themes, reverence for ancestors, weapons and the dead, and its links with ancient customary law and older Albanian ballads can be associated with an indigenous Albanian development that may reach back to antiquity.

== In Bosniak tradition ==
Đerzelez Alija was most popular in the Bosnian Krajina (Frontier) region, where he, as opposed to Albanian tradition, is mostly seen as a Muslim fighting against Christians. Many stories of him fighting Christians or mythological beings exist. The most prominent ones where he fights important Christian figures are "Gjerzelez Alija i Car od Stambola" (Gjerzelez Alija and the Tsar from Istanbul) where a duel between Đerzelez and John Hunyadi, known as "Sibinjanin Janko" in South Slavic epic poetry, occurs. There are instances of Đerzelez being portrayed as a dragon, the Dragon in South Slavic mythology is usually considered to be benevolent. The cycle of Bosnian Muslim songs about Đerzelez remains historically enigmatic in many respects, and the epic tradition of the Serbo-Croatian linguistic region adopts two contrasting attitudes toward the legendary figure. In Muslim songs, Đerzelez appears in most cases as a positive hero; in Serbian and Croatian songs, by contrast, he appears as a violent foreigner and an opponent of the song's principal heroes. In general, the folk literature of the South Slavs contains songs with ecclesiastical motifs, including the motif of Saint George. This is reflected to some extent in both the Muslim and the Christian songs that feature Đerzelez.

Some of the poems which include the name of Đerzelez in their titles are:

- Đerđelez Alija, the Emperor's Champion
- Đerđelez Alija i Vuk Despotović
- Marko Kraljević i Đerzelez Alija (Marko Kralyević and Djerzelez Aliya)
- Banović Sekul i Đerđelez Alija
- Oblačić Rade i Đerđelez Alija
- Đerđelez Alija i Starina Novak
- Đerđelez Alija deli mejdan sa Sibinjanin Jankom
- Ženidba Đerđelez Alije
- Sedam kralja traže glavu Đerđelez Alije
- Junaštvo Đerđelez Alije
- Đerđelez Alija i tri gorska hajduka
- Vuk Jajčanin i Đerđelez Alija
- Komlen kapetan traži glavu Đerđelez Alije
- Đerđelez Alija i ban od Karlova
- Zadarski ban i Đerđelez Alija
- Smrt Đerđelez Alije
- Đerđelez Alija ide u Toku
- Tokalija kralj traži glavu Đerđelez Alije
- Đerzelezovo bolovanje
- Otkud je Đerđelez

Đerzelez is one of the main characters of many other poems without his name in their title, like:

- Porča of Avala and Vuk the Fiery Dragon
- The Marriage of Vuk the Dragon-Despot

According to the legend, Đerzelez also has an epic horse (sometimes called Šarac, as the horse of Prince Marko) and he is a good friend of fairies who help him when he is in danger. Legend says that he was killed during his prayer (salat) because he did not want to interrupt it despite being aware that he would be killed. Another legend mentions Đerzelez and Prince Marko as being bloodbrothers, and Marko considering Đerzelez to be a fierce warrior equal to him. Although it is one of many similarities between the epic poetry of the Bosniaks and that of the Serbs and Croats, Gjergj Elez Alia is not the protagonist but merely a secondary character in Christian tradition. By contrast, the figure is a frequent hero of epic songs amongst the Bosniaks, and songs about him have therefore been published in entire volumes.

== In Albanian tradition ==
In Albanian folklore, Gjergj Elez Alia is regarded as a great warrior and his legend is one of the most popular in Albanian culture. A song of Gjergj Elez Alia was recorded by Bernardin Palaj and Donat Kurti in Nikaj (Tropojë District) and published in Tirana in 1937. This version of the song is regarded as the purest version in Albanian folk literature for a number of reasons. It was recorded in Nikaj, in the Highlands of Gjakova; the Northern Highlands are considered to be the homeland of this epic tradition amongst the Albanians, and considering the wide geographical distribution of the song, certain features of the song's variants in peripheral Albanian-inhabited regions and the ancient cultural values and elements found in the Northern Highlands make it likely that the version recorded in Nikaj is the foundation of the Albanian variants.

In contrast to the South Slavic groups, purely ecclesiastical or broadly religious motifs are absent from Albanian folk literature and especially from its epic tradition, except for several songs whose motifs were brought from the Middle East and were based on the legends and oral traditions of Islam. As such, the Albanian variants of Gjergj Elez Alia are entirely absent of these religious motifs, and among the Albanian variants, only the version from Shala e Bajgorës (the northernmost Albanian version) shares significant elements with the Serbian and Bosniak songs. The common elements are due to direct contact between Albanian and Slavic-speaking groups in these regions, as well as the newer Ottoman layer; the heroes fight to save the sultan's daughter, and after victory they receive rewards or free the people of their homeland from feudal obligations to the sultan.

The main Albanian variants of Gjergj Elez Alia contain many elements that originate in ancient Albanian paganism. The absence of a defined setting in the Albanian song convey that it belongs to an ancient and archaic type of legendary epic song, and the motif may preserve memories of ancient maritime threats to the Albanians. The term bajloz - Gjergj Elez Alia's adversary - may be derived from Latin the baiulus and contrasts with the later Ottoman-era term arap, which may serve as further evidence of the song's antiquity. The Albanian song is distinguished from related Balkan traditions by its setting and its complex system of themes; its use of paganistic Albanian traditions together with its links to older Albanian ballads and customary law indicate that the song developed within a specifically Albanian tradition rather than being borrowed from neighbouring peoples.

The song is usually sung accompanied by the lahuta (gusle), or occasionally with çifteli, by the rapsod (performer of epic poetry). The song of Gjergj Elez Alia is part of the heroic non-historical cycle of Albanian epic poetry, the Kângë Kreshnikësh ("Songs of Heroes"), however it is not related to the epic cycle of the pair of heroic brothers Muji and Halili. In its poetic and compositional structure, the song contains distinctive archaic elements and stands very close to Albanian ballads that deal with the complexity of family relations.

In variants of the legend collected amongst Albanian populations of Kosovo and North Macedonia, Gjergj Elez Alia also appears under other Islamic names, e.g. Hysen Aga, Hysen Kreshniku, Shishman Mehmet Aga, Deli Bajraktari. The farther these variants spread into the peripheral regions of Albanian-inhabited territories, the more faded they become by acquiring similarities to songs with the same motif among other Balkan peoples.

Gjergj Elez Alia had nine wounds on his body and lay suffering for nine years in his house and everybody had forgotten him. Only his sister took care of him night and day for nine years. Then news came that another enemy, Balozi i Zi (black knight) had come from the sea and was killing people and destroying villages every day.
One day Gjergj felt some drops of water on his face and thought that his house had become so old that the rain was coming in. His sister told him that it was not the rain, but her tears on his face. She told him that Balozi had requested her and sooner or later would come to get her. Gjergj then told her to take his horse and make it ready for war, as he was going to fight against the horrible Baloz. He met Baloz the next day and had the fight; Gjergj was victorious. He returned home to his sister and as they hugged with joy, both their hearts stopped beating and they died instantly together. They were then buried in the same grave and the place was never forgotten. Everyone that passed by stopped to remember his great actions.

Scenes of the legend of Gjergj Elez Ali, depicted on postage stamps of Albania (1990)

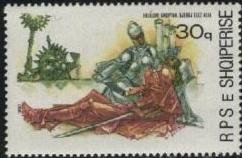
Gjergj Elez Ali lying wounded

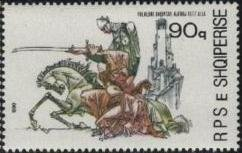
Gjergj Elez Ali being helped onto horse by his sister

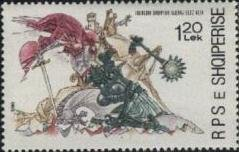
Gjergj Elez Ali fighting Bajloz

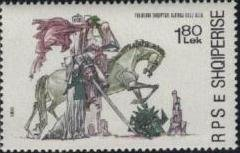
Gjergj Elez Ali on horseback over severed head of Bajloz

== Legacy ==
Ivo Andrić, the 1961 winner of the Nobel Prize in Literature, wrote Put Alije Đerzeleza (transl. The Journey of Alija Đerzelez), published in 1920, after two fragments (Djerzelez at the Inn and Djerzelez on the Road) were published in 1918 and 1919.

In Sarajevo, there is "The House of Alija Đerzelez," one of the oldest houses in the city, located on the Street of Alija Đerzelez. The Commission to Preserve National Monuments of Bosnia and Herzegovina declared it a national monument of Bosnia and Herzegovina in 2005 due to its architectural significance as a residential complex. There are streets in several towns in Bosnia and Herzegovina (Bihać, Gračanica, Zenica, etc.) named after him.

== Sources ==
- Elsie, Robert (2004). Songs of the frontier warriors. Bolchazy-Carducci Publishers. ISBN 978-0-86516-412-3.
- Popović, Tanya (1988). Prince Marko: the hero of South Slavic epics. Syracuse, N.Y.: Syracuse University Press. ISBN 978-0-8156-2444-8.
- Hadžijahić, Muhamed (1934), Narodne pjesme o Djerzelez Aliji [Folk songs about Djerzelez Alija] (in Croatian), Sarajevo: Št. O. Šehić, OCLC 444780203
- Pipa, Arshi (2017) [1982]. Aristea Kola, Lisandri Kola (ed.). "Rapsodë shqiptarë në serbokroatisht: cikli epik i kreshnikëve" (PDF). Kêns. Translated by Lisandri Kola: 25–79. ISSN 2521-7348.
- Prifti, Kristaq (2002). Instituti i Historisë (Akademia e Shkencave e RSH) (ed.). Historia e popullit shqiptar. Historia e popullit shqiptar në katër vëllime (in Albanian). Vol. 1. Botimet Toena. ISBN 9789992716229.
