= Qemal =

Given name

Qemal is a masculine given name. It may refer to:

- Qemal Butka (1907–1997), Albanian architect, painter, politician, and postage stamp engraver
- Qemal Haxhihasani (1916–1991), Albanian historian and folklorist
- Qemal Karaosmani (1875–1948), signatory of the Albanian Declaration of Independence, activist of Albanian education
- Qemal Karosmani, Albanian politician and mayor of Elbasan in 1939
- Qemal Mullai, 19th-century Albanian politician
- Qemal Mustafaraj (born 1995), Albanian professional footballer
- Qemal Omari, Turkish former football player, manager and referee who was of Albanian heritage
- Qemal Stafa (1920–1942), founding member of the Albanian Communist Party, and the leader of its youth section
- Ismail Qemal bey Vlora (1844–1919), leader of the Albanian national movement
- Qemal Vogli (1929–2004), Albanian footballer
- Qemal Bey Vrioni (1885–1946), Albanian political figure of 1930s and 1940s

== See also ==
- Qemal Stafa High School, high school, located in Tirana, Albania
- Qemal Stafa Stadium, the largest football stadium in Tirana, Albania
