= Zef (disambiguation) =

Zef (Afrikaans: [ˈzɛf]) is a South African counter-culture movement. Zef or ZEF may also refer to

- Zef (name), Albanian masculine given name, a short form of Yossef or Joseph
- Elkin Municipal Airport in North Carolina, United States (location identifier ZEF)
- ZEF, an acronym, standing for zygote, embryo and fetus (the three stages of prenatal development)
