= Pllana =

Pllana is an Albanian surname. Notable people with the surname include:

- Bujar Pllana (born 2001), Albanian footballer
- Leonard Pllana (born 1996), Kosovan footballer
- Shefqet Pllana (1918-1994), Kosovan ethnographer
