= Baloz =

Sea monster in Albanian mythology

Baloz or bajloz is a legendary character in Albanian mythology and folklore, who appears as an antagonist of the Albanian legendary heroes. He sometimes is described as a sea monster.

== Etymology ==
The word baloz or bajloz seems to be derived from the Latin word baiulus. The word baloz, in its Latin form, was used during the Byzantine period, while the title bailo designated the rulers or representatives of the Angevins and the Venetians. Maximilian Lambertz also suggested that the word 'Baloz' is derived from Italian bailo, the title of the Venetian ambassador to the Ottomans.

== Folklore ==
Baloz (as a character) has been found in many Albanian myths and legends about fighting against the Albanian nobles such as: Muji, Halili, Gjergj Elez Alia and Constantin. The monster is found in the Albanian Songs of the Frontier Warriors. In Albanian folklore, the Baloz is depicted as a colossal sea monster, often emerging from the depths to terrorize coastal regions, with its immense size causing the earth to tremble upon approach. Descriptions emphasize its gigantic stature, portraying it as a mighty giant far surpassing previous scourges in scale and power. The creature's form is frequently armored for battle, clad in a heavy coat of armor that underscores its warrior-like menace, complemented by a steel helmet protecting its head, it rides a similarly armored steed, amplifying its thunderous advance across the land. Upon defeat, the Baloz's blood flows black, capable of darkening entire rivers, highlighting its otherworldly and corrupting essence.

Detailed descriptions have been found in a collection of Albanian myths named Ancient Albanian Tales (Albanian: Tregime të Moçme Shqiptare) collected and rewritten by Dhimitër Pasko.

Baloz Sedelija was a Slavic warrior in Albanian folklore. Another character was Baloz(i) i Zi.
