= Shalë, Albania =

Shalë
- Administrative unit
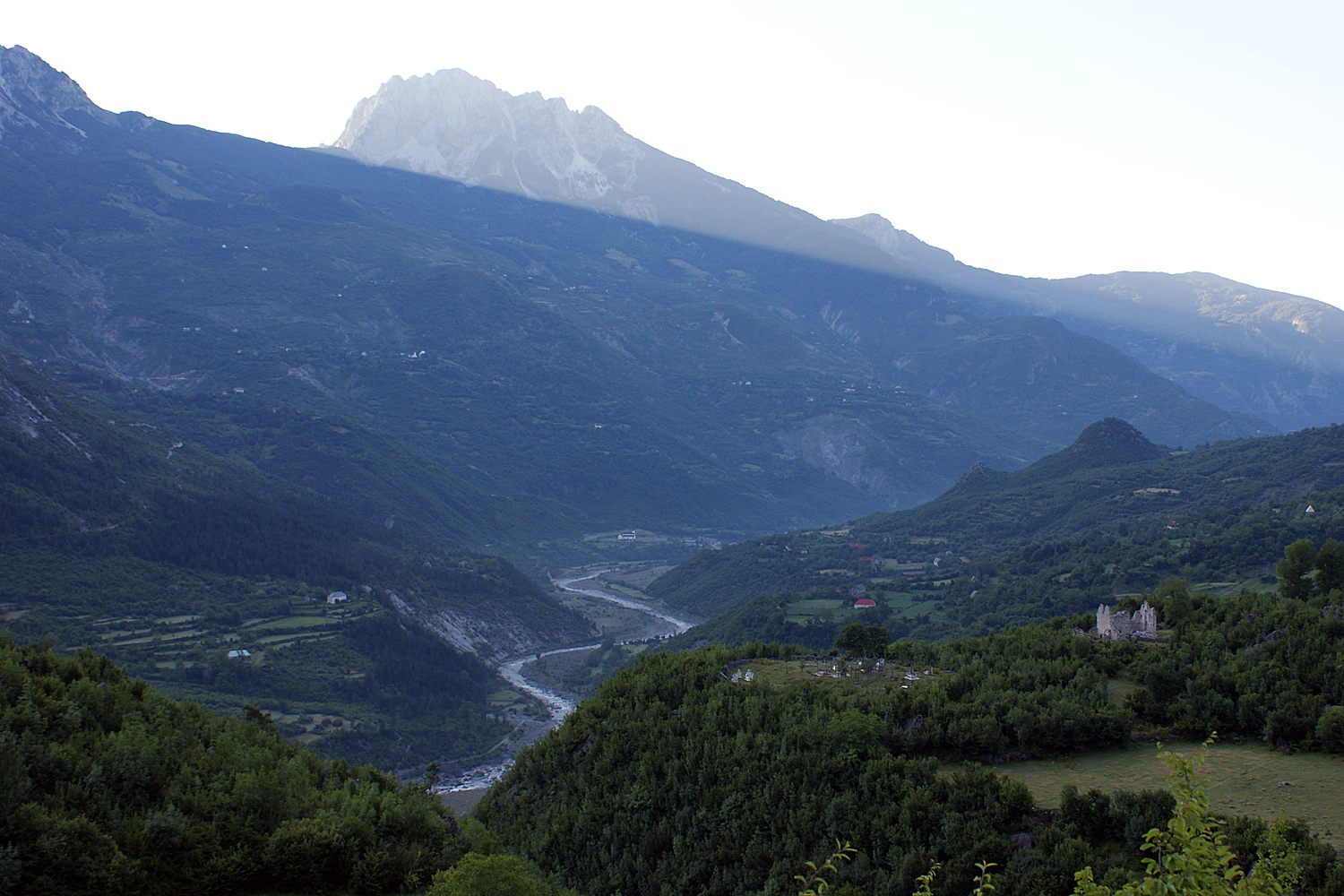
- Shalë river valley

- Location within Albania
- Coordinates: 42°18′N 19°48′E
- Country: Albania
- County: Shkodër
- Municipality: Shkodër

Population (2011)
  - Administrative unit: 1,804
- Time zone: UTC+1 (CET)
  - Summer (DST): UTC+2 (CEST)
- Website: www.komunashale.al

Shalë is a former municipality in the Shkodër County, northwestern Albania. At the 2015 local government reform it became a subdivision of the municipality Shkodër. The population at the 2011 census was 1,804. Its name comes from the Shala tribe which lives in the area. The municipal unit covers the upper course of the river Shalë, and part of the Accursed Mountains range. There are eleven small mountain villages in the municipality: Breg-Lumi, Abat, Nicaj-Shalë, Lekaj, Vuksanaj, Pecaj, Theth, Ndërlysaj, Gimaj, Nen-Mavriq, Mekshaj, and Lotaj. It is part of the Dukagjin Highlands region.

== Gallery ==
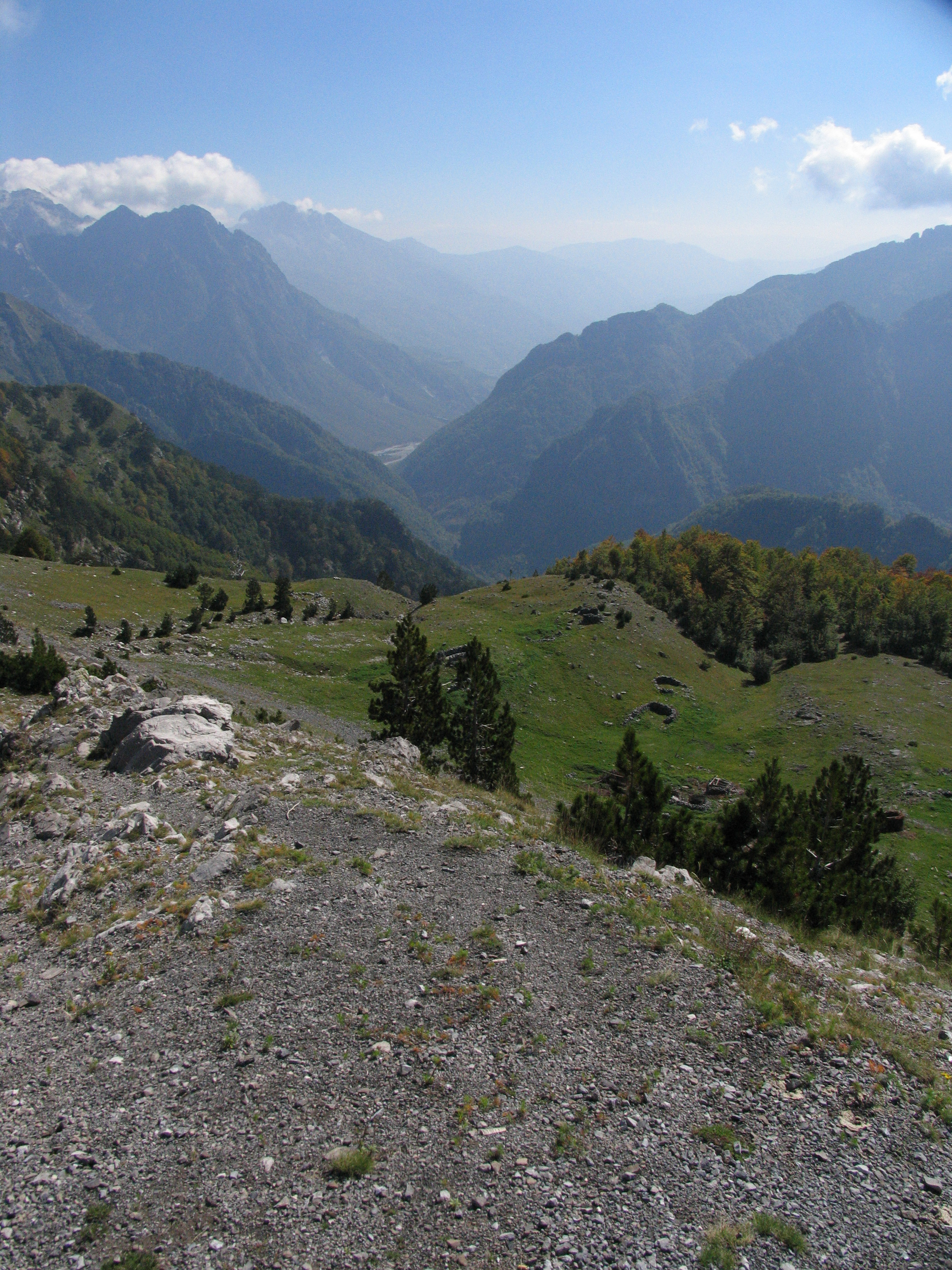
Theth valley

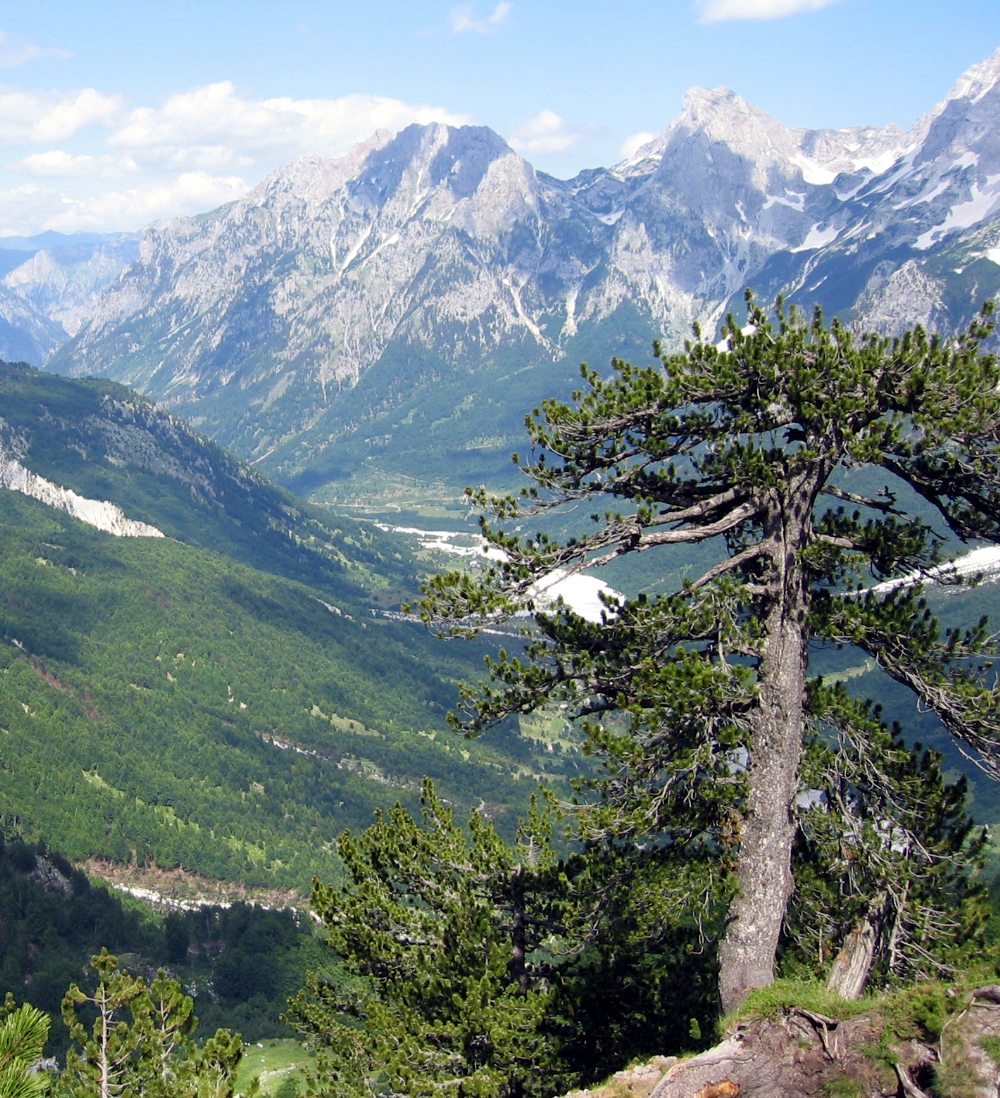
Theth valley
