= Zef (name) =

Zef is an Albanian masculine given name. It is a short form of the Hebrew name Yossef (יוֹסֵף) and a variant of Joseph. The name Zef may refer to:

== People ==
- Zef Bushati (born 1953), Albanian diplomat
- Zef Eisenberg (1973–2020), British motorcycle racer
- Zef Gashi (born 1938), Montenegrin archbishop
- Zef Jubani (1818–1880), Albanian writer
- Zef Kol Ndoka (1883–1924), Albanian military commander
- Zef Kolombi (1907–1949), Albanian painter
- Zef Mala (1915–1979), Albanian writer
- Zef Mazi (born 1956), Albanian diplomat
- Zef Mirdita (1936–2016), Kosovan historian from Prizren
- Zef Pllumi (1924–2007), Albanian priest and writer
- Zef Skiroi (1865–1927), Albanian writer
- Zef Serembe (1844–1901), Albanian poet
- Zef Shoshi (born 1939), Albanian painter
- Zef Simoni (1928–2009), Albanian priest

== See also ==
- Yossef (disambiguation)
- Zeff (surname)
- Zev (disambiguation)
