= Qemal Karosmani =

Albanian politician

Qemal Karosmani was an Albanian politician and mayor of Elbasan from 1939 through 1939.
