= Zeff (surname) =

Zeff is a surname.

Notable people with the surname include:

- Dan Zeff, British television director
- Leo Zeff (1912-1988), American psychologist
- Edward Zeff (1904–1974), British agent of the Special Operations Executive
- Stephen A. Zeff (born 1933), American economist
