= Tonin Çobani =

Albanian writer and folklorist (born 1947)

- Born: 5 November 1947 (age 78); Shkodër, Albania
- Education: University of Tirana
- Occupations: Folklorist; Writer; Historian; Journalist; Teacher
- Writing career
- Language: Albanian; Greek
- Genre: Mythology

Tonin Çobani (born 5 November 1947) is an Albanian writer, folklorist and scholar from the city of Shkodër in Northern Albania. He is known for his works revolving Albanian mythology and Illyrian mythology, as well as works on Albanian historical figures such as Lekë Dukagjini, Frang Bardhi and Naim Frashëri. Çobani also worked as an academic in multiple universities around Albania, most notably the University of Shkodra.

Tonin Çobani also studies the life of Gjergj Fishta as well as Fishta's book The Highland Lute, which he uses as the main source in his books and works on Albanian (Arbëresh) folklore. He has also made several works on the "mythological parts" of the book. Tonin is a descendant of the Çobani tribe, a notable tribe of Shkodër.

== Life ==
=== Childhood ===
Tonin Çobani was born on 5 November 1947 in the city of Shkodër, Albania. He is a descendant of the Çobani tribe, a tribe which has lived in the territory of Shkodër since 1734 according to documents found in the church of the city. He completed elementary, middle and high school in his city and was considered as a "notable student" with good grades. He completed the Pedagogical high school of Shkodër during 1961-1965.

=== Later education ===
Çobani's high school success led him to being accepted into the University of History in Tirana, in the language-literature branch during 1965-1969. After completing university, he also got his PhD from the Centre of Albanialogical Studies (CAS) after defending the thesis "Mythological conception in the Highland Lute" dedicated to the mythological aspects of Fishta's book. During 1977-1978, while working as an educator and writer, he also completed the post-university study of literature critic after defending the thesis "Attitude towards Naim frashëri and his works during 1912-1939".

=== Later life and occupations ===
After graduating from the University of Tirana, Tonin Çobani began working as a teacher in the high school of Lezhë where he also organized the school's music band which operated in local theaters and would regularly find themselves in the local press. During the same time, he also worked as an academic in the Luigj Kurakuqi university of Shkodër. From 1976, he began working in the local press article "Drita" where he published his first critical-literary work. Two years later, in 1978, he would go on to win the yearly award of the "Nëntori" article. In 1988, he began his writing career by writing the book "Kërkime letrare" together with Dhimitër Shuteriqi, Jup Kastrati and Razi Brahimi, a collection of essays and studies.

== Role in Albaniology ==
Throughout his life, Tonin Çobani had been invested in topics revolving around Albaniological studies, especially Albanian paganism. He would study the Lahuta e Malcis by Gjergj Fishta writing a series of works on it from 2008-2013.

In 2017, Çobani published the book "Mitologji Shqiptare" (Albanian Mythology), a 130-page book which talks about paganism throughout the history of the Albanians. The book is divided into 3 chapters, the first being on Pelasgian mythology, the second on Illyrian mythology and the third on Albanian paganism.

== Selected works ==
The following are a list of books published by Tonin Çobani:

=== Scientific books ===
- "The rumored prince Lekë Dukagjini", Tiranë 2003.
- "Frang Bardhi and his relations", Zagreb 2006
- "Pjetër Zarishi and the Creation of the World", Tiranë 2007
- "Mythological characters in the Highland Lute", Tiranë 2008
- "Mother Teresa, veneration in Albanian lands", Pristina 2010
- "The Highland Lute, mythological conception and dictionary of mythological figures", Tiranë 2012
- "Essayistics", Tiranë 2013
- "Albanian mythology", Tiranë 2017

=== Stories and novels ===
- "Kissing without kissing", Lezhë 1996
- "A woman facing herself", Lezhë 1997
- "Prose etudes, six triptychs", Tiranë 2002
- "Variations with the word nation", Tiranë 2004

=== Compilements of studies and essays ===
- "Literary research", Tiranë 1988
- "The Fishtan myth and anti-myth", Tiranë 1999
- "Cultural parallels of a city", Tiranë 2001
- "Fishtology", Lezhë 2006
