= Anton Berisha =

Albanian folklorist

- Born: 7 August 1946 (age 80); Klina, Kosovo
- Education: University of Pristina
- Occupations: Linguist, Albanian scholar and folklorist

Anton Nikë Berisha (born August 7, 1946) is an Albanian scholar and folklorist. He has been teaching Albanian at the University of Calabria since 1992, and is considered an expert in Albanian oral and Arbëreshë literature. He is one of the Albanologists who have carried out extensive research on Albanian epic poetry, in particular collecting and publishing Kângë Kreshnikësh, the traditional songs of the heroic legendary cycle of Albanian epic poetry.

== Biography ==
Anton Berisha was born on August 7, 1946, in Mirash in the municipality of Klina in Kosovo. He went to school at Ujmir and Pristina. He studied Albanian language and literature at the University of Pristina. He finished his postgraduate studies at the University of Zagreb, where he earned his doctorate in 1981.

On July 1, 1973, Berisha was appointed to the department of folklore of the Albanological Institute of Pristina, where he worked for many years. In 1991 he moved to Italy and has been teaching Albanian at the University of Calabria since 1992.

== Bibliography ==
- Elsie, Robert (2004). Historical dictionary of Kosova. Scarecrow Press. ISBN 0-8108-5309-4.
- Elsie, Robert; Mathie-Heck, Janice (2004). Songs of the Frontier Warriors. Wauconda, Illinois: Bolchazy-Carducci Publishers, Incorporated. ISBN 0-86516-412-6.
- Lanksch, Hans-Joachim (2010). "Der Dichter Martin Camaj (1925 – 1992). Ein Porträt". In Demiraj, Bardhyl (ed.). Wir sind die Deinen: Studien zur albanischen Sprache, Literatur und Kulturgeschichte, dem Gedenken an Martin Camaj (1925–1992) gewidmet. Otto Harrassowitz Verlag. ISBN 978-3-447-06221-3.
- Neziri, Zymer U.; Scaldaferri, Nicola (2016), "From the Archive to the Field: New Research on Albanian Epic Songs", Conference: Singers and Tales in the 21st Century; The Legacies of Milman Parry and Albert Lord, Washington DC: Center for Hellenic Studies
