= Abat =

- Village
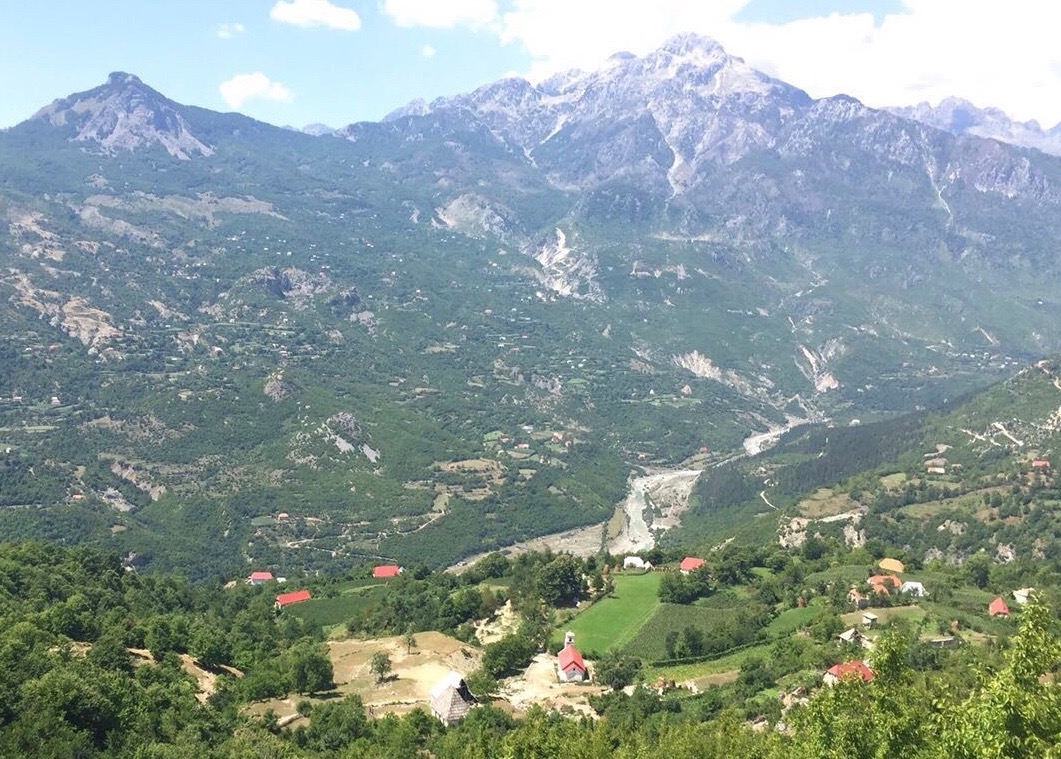

- Location within Albania
- Coordinates: 42°18′45″N 19°48′28″E
- Country: Albania
- County: Shkodër
- Municipality: Shkodër
- Administrative unit: Shalë
- Time zone: UTC+1 (CET)
  - Summer (DST): UTC+2 (CEST)

Abat is a community in the former Shalë municipality, Shkodër County, northern Albania. At the 2015 local government reform it became part of the municipality Shkodër.
