= Anton Çetta =

Albanian folklorist, academic and professor

Anton Çeta
- Born: 3 January 1920; Gjakova, Kosovo
- Died: 3 November 1995 (aged 75); Pristina, FR Yugoslavia (now Kosovo)

Anton Çeta (3 January 1920 – 4 November 1995) was an Albanian folklorist, academic and university professor from Kosovo.

== Biography ==
Anton Çetta was born in Gjakova, completed elementary school in his hometown and secondary school in Tirana and Korça, Albania. He graduated in Romance languages and culture at the University of Belgrade Faculty of Philosophy. For a period of time he worked as assistant professor at the department of Albanian Studies in Belgrade. From 1960 to 1968 he lectured on Old Albanian Literature, The History of Literature, and Latin language at the University of Pristina.

From 1968 he was chief of the Department of Folklore at the Institute of Albanian Studies in Prishtina. Since 1959, Çeta was collecting folklore material from all regions of Kosovo. From 1953 to 1987, he published 16 books of collected folklore from all regions of Kosovo (this includes fairy tales, myths, ballads, legends, songs etc.).

In 1990, he was the founder of the Reconciliation Committee for erasing blood feuds in Kosovo (Albanian: Komiteti për pajtimin e gjaqeve në Kosovë) which erased almost all blood-related hatred among Albanians in Kosovo in the 1990s. He also was president of the Mother Teresa Association, which provided medical care to people in Kosovo, a position taken over after his death by Don Lush Gjergji, his long-time collaborator in the anti blood feud campaign. He died in Pristina in 1995.

On 30 April 2010, he was awarded with the "Golden Medal for Peace, Democracy and Humanism-Dr. Ibrahim Rugova" prize, by the Kosovar president Fatmir Sejdiu.
