= Shefqet Pllana =

Albanian writer

Shefqet Pllana (1918–1994) was an ethnic Albanian ethnographer and scholar from Kosovo. He authored more than 140 articles in his lifetime and was specialized in Albanian folk music.
