= Zef Jubani =

Albanian philosopher (1818–1880)

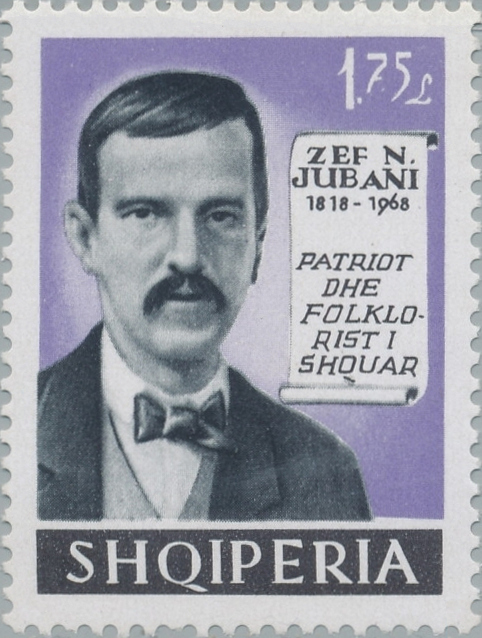
- Jubani on a 1968 stamp of Albania
- Born: Zef Ndokillia; 1818; Shkodër, Ottoman Empire, modern Albania
- Died: February 1, 1880 (aged 61–62)
- Occupations: folklorist, writer
- Writing career
- Language: Albanian; French; Italian
- Notable works: Collection of Albanian Folk Songs and Rhapsodies
- Literary movement: Albanian National Awakening

Zef Jubani or Giuseppe Jubany in Italian (born Zef Ndokillia; 1818 – February 1, 1880) was an Albanian folklorist and activist of the Albanian National Awakening. He is known for the publication of a Collection of Albanian Folk Songs and Rhapsodies in the Gheg Albanian dialect. Jubani advocated the creation of a unique alphabet of the Albanian language. For his political activities, which often were anti-clericalist, Jubani was denounced to the Holy See by the Jesuit missionaries of Shkodër.

== Life ==
Zef Jubani was born in 1818 in Shkodër, Ottoman Empire, to a notable merchant family from the nearby village of Juban. His mother was from Malta, so between 1830 and 1838 he studied there while living with his uncle. After returning to Shkodër he worked since 1848 as a secretary to the French consul of the city and also became the assistant of the vice consul of the United Kingdom in 1853. Jubani spent a significant part of his life in Trieste, Venice and modern Montenegro.

== Legacy ==
=== Works ===
Since 1850 Jubani documented the folklore of his home region. In 1858 part of his work was published in the Histoire et description de la Haute Albanie ou Guegarie written by Hyacinthe Hecguard, then French consul of Shkodër. The original texts of the folk songs documented by Jubani included in Hecguard's work were lost on 13 January 1866 during a flood in Shkodër. His best known work is the Collection of Albanian Folk Songs and Rhapsodies (Albanian: Përmbledhje këngësh popullore dhe rrapsodish shqiptare, Italian: Raccolta di canti popolari e rapsodie di poemi albanesi) published in 1871 in Trieste. The Collection of Albanian Folk Songs and Rhapsodies is the first collection of folk songs in the Gheg Albanian dialect and the first folklore work published by an Albanian who lived in Albania. The book was published along with two political and philosophical studies of Jubani the Current situation of the population of northern Albania (Albanian: Gjendja aktuale e popullit të Shqiperisë së Veriut) and Thoughts on the moral situation and intellectual culture of the Albanian people (Albanian: Kundrime mbi gjëndjen morale dhe mbi kulturën intelektuale të popullit shqiptar), which were introductory to his main work.

In the two introductory studies Jubani advocated for the formation of a literary commission for the purification of the Albanian language and the promotion of Albanian literature. Jubani also supported the creation of a unique alphabet for the Albanian language, arguing that since Albanian was a unique language, it should have a separate alphabet, and wrote a grammar textbook of the Albanian language. In Trieste he became one of the editors of a local newspaper and in 1873 he edited and translated from Ottoman Turkish to Italian Law, appendix and procedure of the Ottoman commerce (Italian: Codice e appendice e procedura commercialo ottomano), a book about commerce practices in the Ottoman Empire. In 1878 he published in Venice a pamphlet to encourage the use of steamships in routes between Albania and Italy. Jubani's study On the Albanian poetry and music was among the first works that dealt with the polyphonic music of the area of Myzeqe.

=== Political philosophy ===
Jubani's political philosophy was influenced largely by classical liberalism and anti-clericalism during his travels in Malta and Italy. He believed that reforms should be based on an industrial economic policy, the center of which would be an Albanian bourgeoisie, whose commerce with Europe would be encouraged and it would pay lower taxes, while that social class would heavily support the industrial development of Albania.

He often accused the Catholic and Muslim clergy of inciting and encouraging religious segregation and differences. Jubani criticized the Italian missionaries for teaching only in Italian, while in previous years Albanian had been used too. The Jesuit missionaries of Shkodër eventually denounced Jubani to the Holy See as an anti-clerical propagandist.
