= Qemal Haxhihasani =

Albanian historian and folklorist

Qemal Haxhihasani (1916–1991) was an Albanian historian and folklorist. He is regarded as a leading expert on epic and heroic verse.
