= Bernardin Palaj =

Albanian Franciscan friar, folklorist and poet

Blessed Bernardin Palaj O.F.M.
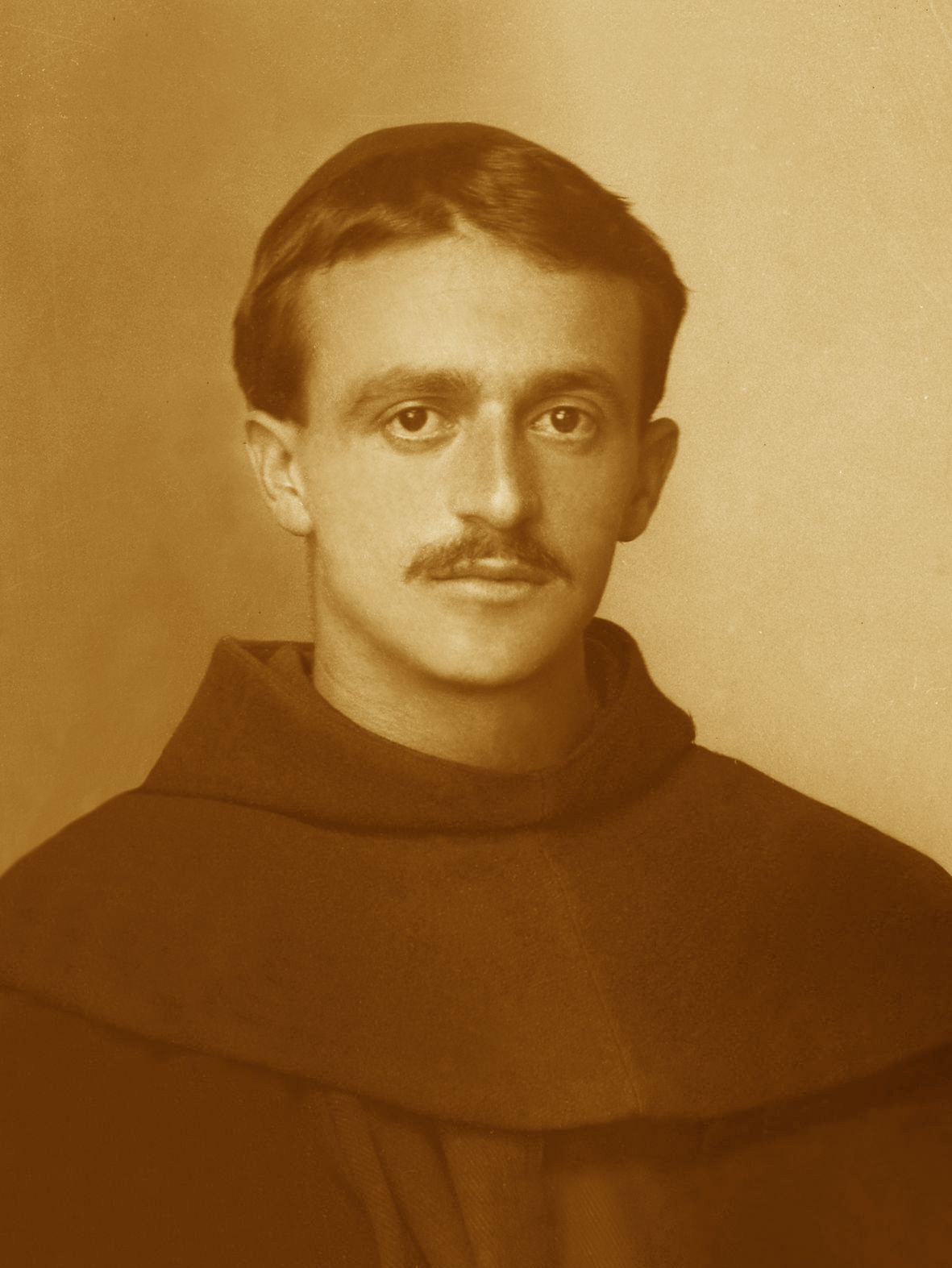
- Photo of Bernardin Palaj photographed by Kel Marubi
- Born: Zef Palaj; 2 December 1894; Shkodër, Scutari Vilayet, Ottoman Empire (today Albania)
- Died: 5 March 1945 (aged 53); Shkodër, Albania
- Venerated in: Roman Catholic Church
- Beatified: 5 November 2016, St. Stephen's Cathedral, Shkodër by Pope Francis
- Feast: 5 March (date of martyrdom)

Bernardin Palaj (20 October 1894 — 8 December 1947) was an Albanian Franciscan friar, folklorist and poet.

== Life ==
Born as Zef Palaj in Shkodër, to Gjon and Marta Dedaj, originally from the mountains of Shllak. Bernardin Palaj went to Franciscan schools in Shkodër, joined the Franciscan order in September 1911, and finished his education in Salzburg, Austria. Ordained as a priest in 1918, Palaj was an organist at the Franciscan church in Shkodra from 1916 to 1946, taught Albanian and Latin at the Collegium Illyricum (Illyrian College), and served as parish priest in Pult and Rubik. From April 1923 to December 1924, together with Shuk Gurakuqi, Ndre Mjeda, Gjergj Fishta and Anton Harapi, he edited the Shkodra weekly newspaper Ora e maleva (The mountain times), affiliated with the parliamentary opposition. He was arrested by Zogu in 1924 but released through the intervention of Archbishop Lazër Mjeda. In the period of 1919–1934, he collected folklore from the mountains, material that was published in the leading periodical Hylli i Dritës (The Daystar). Together with Donat Kurti, he published Kângë kreshnikës dhe legenda (Songs of the frontier Warriors and Legends) in the impressive Visaret e kombit (Treasures of the Nation) collection, Tirana 1937. From 1934 to 1941, he also increasingly produced literary works of his own, mostly classical lyric and elegiac verse and short stories. From 1939 to 1944, Palaj served as a police captain under Italian rule and German occupation, though he was apparently ill from 1942 onwards. He also devoted the war years to research on customary law and tribal organisation in northern Albania. His police work under the occupation, whatever form it took, did not endear him to the Partisans. With the Communist takeover in late 1944, Palaj fled to the mountains, but was arrested in Rubik in 1946. Palaj died in prison of tetanus in February or December 1946 before he could be sentenced, and was buried in the courtyard of the sanatorium in Shkodra.

Palaj and Donat Kurti were the first to record the Albanian language song 'Gjergj Elez Alia' which was published in Tirana in 1937.

== Sources ==
- Elsie, Robert (2004). Songs of the frontier warriors. Bolchazy-Carducci Publishers. ISBN 978-0-86516-412-3.
