= Donat Kurti =

Albanian translator (1903–1983)

- Born: September 3, 1903; Shkodër, Ottoman Empire
- Died: November 11, 1983 (aged 80); Albania
- Occupations: Catholic cleric, teacher, folklorist
- Known for: The Songs of the Frontier Warriors and Legends (1937)

Donat Kurti (1903–1983) was an Albanian franciscan friar, educator, scholar and folklorist. Donat Kurti was born in Shkodër, back then Ottoman Empire). He studied theology and philosophy at the Collegium Antonianum in Rome and was ordained as a Franciscan priest in 1927. After his return to Shkodra, he taught at the Illyrian college. Kurti was particularly interested in Albanian folklore and epic verse. With Bernardin Palaj, he published the best-known cycles of epic poetry in Kângë kreshnikësh dhe legenda (The Songs of the Frontier Warriors and Legends), Tirana, 1937.

After World War II, as many other Catholic priests, Kurti was arrested by the communists in 1946 and spent the next 17 years in various prisons (in Shkodra, Burrel, Beden, and other internment camps). During this period he translated the New Testament into Albanian. He is also remembered for his two-volume Prralla kombtare mbledhë prej gojës së popullit (National Folk Tales Collected from the Mouth of the People), Shkodra, 1940, 1942.

== See also ==
- Catholicism in Albania
- Thimi Mitko
- Shtjefën Gjeçovi
- Albanology
