= Misto Treska =

Albanian translator (1914–1993)

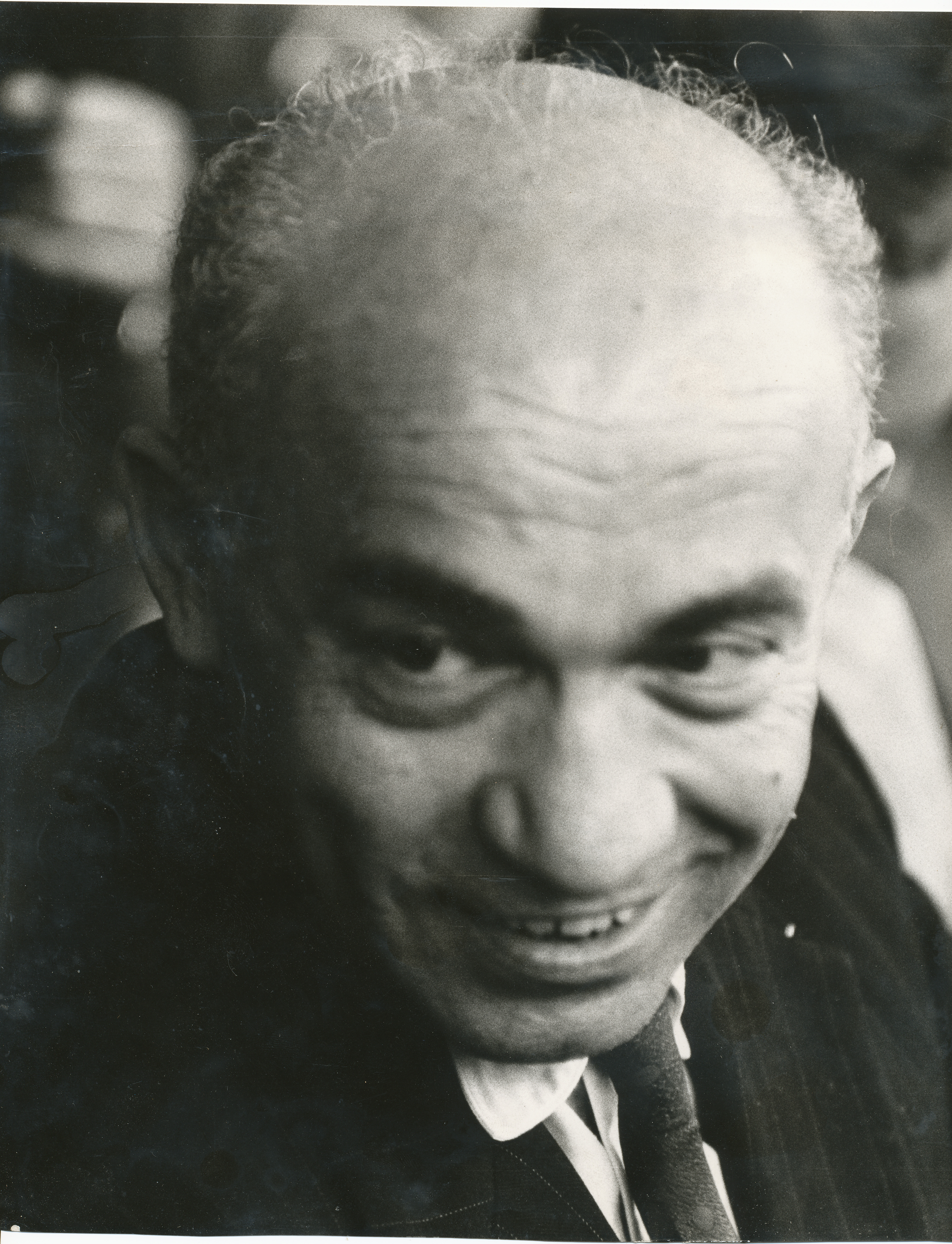
- Born: 19 April 1914; Treskë, Korçë, Albania
- Died: 23 June 1993 (aged 79); Tirana, Albania
- Other name: Mitre S. Toska
- Occupations: Translator, Diplomat (Ambassador), Writer
- Known for: Translation of French literature

Misto Treska (19 April 1914 – 23 June 1993) was an Albanian translator, diplomat (Ambassador), writer and politician of Albania during communist regime. He has translated French authors such as Hugo, Maupassant, Stendhal and Diderot into Albanian. He has served in the Albanian diplomacy, particularly in exchanges of cultural relations of Albania with foreign countries. He has notably been Ambassador in Paris. Treska was also one of the prosecutors of the military trial in which Axis collaborators Lef Nosi, Anton Harapi, Maliq Bushati were sentenced to death.

== Early life ==
Misto Treska was born in Treskë, Korçë, on 19 April 1914. He attended the Korçë Lyceum along with other outstanding names like Pandi Geço, Vedat Kokona and Mahir Domi. Since at his early life, he was distinguished for his active help in the cultural and artistic life of the city. Under the pen name Mitre S. Toska, he published regularly articles and translations in "Rilindja" (Eng. Renaissance) and "Bota e Re" (Eng. New World), the socio-political and literary journals of the time, together with the then distinguished writers, like Sterjo Spase, Migjeni, Petro Marko, Nonda Bulka etc. Also, Treska put on stage plays "Den Politiske Kandestøber" (Eng. The Political Tinker or The Pewterer turned Politician) by Ludvig Holberg, "En Folkefiende" (Eng. An Enemy of the People) by Henrik Ibsen, and other plays by Molière, Jean Racine and Victor Eftimiu, playing at the same time as an actor. In later years, he worked for the Albanian Encyclopedic Dictionary, entries dedicated to the period of the 1920s and 1930s.

== Years of World War II ==
Misto Treska took part in the first anti-fascist organizations of the city of Korçë. In April 1939, he was arrested for resistance against the Italian occupiers and was transferred into the prisons of Durrës, Zvërnec (in Vlorë), Krujë and from there to Messina, Italy, where he stayed for two years. Upon release from prison, he joined the Albanian Anti-Fascist National Liberation Army, the 20th Brigade, where he was ranked as its Commissar. The lyrics of this brigade would retain his signature. Throughout this period, Treska continued contribution to the country's literary life as a publicist, when his pen against the fascist invaders was felt particularly strong. He attended the Conference of Berati in 1944 and was one of the Albanian delegates to the Peace Conference in 1946. Being a member of the Presidium of the League of Writers and Artists of Albania, he submitted for publication novels of Maxim Gorky, "Malva" and "Birth of a Man", which were received warmly by readers.

== After World War II ==
He was one of the founders of the Albanian League of Writers and Artists. The opus of his translation is broad and multidimensional, not only as a translator of prose but also as a translator of poetry. He was awarded with various orders and medals in the field of diplomacy and he was evaluated and awarded as a translator several times. He enriched his translation by writing introductions for them, in which he gives explanations for the time they were written and ideas conveyed by the authors. Treska translated masterpieces: Les Misérables and Ninety-Three by Hugo, La Religieuse (Eng. The Nun) by Denis Diderot, Lucien Leuwen by Stendhal, Bel-Ami by Guy de Maupassant, Colas Breugnon by Romain Rolland, Le Petit Chose by Alphonse Daudet, poems by Louis Aragon and Paul Éluard, etc.

Translation of the epopee Les Misérables saw the light of translation in Albanian about a century after Sami Frashëri had translated it in Turkish. The then regime would not allow the full publication of this novel, but Misto Treska refused to step out even a small part. Better not published than to offer it in a mutilated form to the reader – he insisted. For this reason this work remained in his drawers for about 18 years. Treska's translations are to be found in Hugo Museum in Paris, together with one of his dedication introductions, titled Translating Hugo means translating France.

During the years 1957–1974, Misto Treska served as President of the Albanian Committee for Cultural and Friendly Relations with the Outside World. In the years 1979–1981, he was appointed ambassador to France, the Netherlands, Belgium and Luxembourg. On 24 January 1981, he was selected as an honorary citizen of the city of Rubelles, France. Treska developed close friendship with many French personalities prominent in the field of politics and culture.

=== Translations ===
Among the translations made by Treska are the following:

- Victor Hugo, Les Misérables, Quatrevingt-treize
- Guy de Maupassant, Bel-Ami
- Stendhal, Lucien Leuwen
- Denis Diderot, La Religieuse
- Alphonse Daudet, Le Petit Chose
- Maxim Gorky, Malva, Birth of a Man
- Louis Aragon, Le Fou d'Elsa, Selected Poems
- Paul Éluard, Selected Poems
- Gabriel Péri, Richard the Lionheart
- Romain Rolland, Colas Breugnon (This translation is awarded 'First Class Price of the Republic of Albania')
- Claire Etcherelli, Elise ou la vraie vie
- Jean Bruller (Vercors), Le Silence de la mer
- Harry Mulisch, De Aanslag (Eng. The Assault)
- Jean Racine, Les Plaideurs
- Molière, Les Fourberies de Scapin
- French Road Code and Rail Transport (available at the Ministry of Transports and Public Works)

== Post Mortem ==
Treska was awarded First Prize 'For Contribution in Relations between France and Albania'. In 2004, he is honoured with the title 'Honorary Citizen of Korçë'. In 2006, with the decision of the City Council, Library No. 5 in Tirana, is given the name 'Misto A. Treska'. In 2010, one of the streets of Tirana bears the name of Misto Treska, in tribute and respect to his work and contribution.
