= Lyceum =

Type of school, usually a secondary school

The lyceum is a category of educational institution defined within the education system of many countries, mainly in Europe. The definition varies among countries; usually it is a type of secondary school. Basic science and some introduction to specific professions are generally taught.

== History ==
Lyceum is a Latin rendering of the Ancient Greek Λύκειον (Lykeion), the name of a gymnasium in Classical Athens dedicated to Apollo Lyceus. This original lyceum is remembered as the location of the peripatetic school of Aristotle. Some countries derive the name for their modern schools from the Latin but use the Greek name for the ancient school: for example, Dutch has lykeion (ancient) and lyceum (modern), both rendered lyceum in English (note that in classical Latin the C in lyceum was always pronounced as a K, not a soft C, as in modern English).

The name lycée was retrieved and utilized by Napoleon in 1802 to name the main secondary education establishments. From France the name spread in many countries influenced by French culture.

== By country ==
=== Asia ===
==== India ====
The Liceu Nacional Afonso de Albuquerque in Panaji, Goa – established in 1854 in Portuguese Goa, following the Portuguese model – was the first public secondary school in the then-overseas Portuguese territory. Later, the Goa Lyceum received the official title of Liceu Nacional Afonso de Albuquerque (Afonso de Albuquerque National Lyceum).

The Christ University Lyceum in Bengaluru, Karnataka - established in 2021, where scholars sit and do their research work and have discussion.

==== Philippines ====
The Philippines follows its version of the K-12 system, where the term junior high school might be used instead of lyceum. However, there are schools that appropriate the word lyceum in their name. The Lyceum of the Philippines University (LPU) is a university in Manila established by former wartime president José P. Laurel. Among its notable alumni are former president Rodrigo Duterte, popular author Rene Villanueva, and actor Cesar Montano. LPU has campuses in Makati, Batangas, Laguna, Cavite, and Davao.

The Filipino word for lyceum is liseo from Spanish liceo which can be found in some names of various universities and educational institutions which are unaffiliated with LPU.

==== Sri Lanka ====
Lyceum International School (abbreviated as LIS), popularly known as Lyceum and its students as Lyceumers, is the largest International School network in Sri Lanka providing all pre-primary, primary and secondary education. Lyceum also holds the title as the largest school in Sri Lanka with over 25,000 students and 3,300 teachers and staff (as of 2025 February).

Lyceum International School was founded by Dr. Mohan Lal Grero in 1993, to foster all-round development through English-medium learning in Sri Lanka. At its inception, Lyceum International School had only seven students and four teachers. The school's motto is derived from the Ancient Greek aphorism "Know thyself".

==== Uzbekistan ====
Lyceums also emerged in the former Soviet Union countries after they became independent. One typical example is Uzbekistan, where all high schools were replaced with lyceums (litsey is the Russian term, derived from French lycée), offering a three-year educational program with a certain major in a certain direction. Unlike Turkey, Uzbek lyceums do not hold university entrance examinations, which gives students the right to enter a university, but they hold a kind of mock examination which is designed to test their eligibility for a certain university.

=== Europe ===
==== Albania ====
The Albanian National Lyceum was a high school in the city of Korçë, Albania, that emphasized French culture and European values. The school fully functioned with a French cultural emphasis from 1917 to 1939. The school was continued post World War II as the Raqi Qirinxhi High School.

==== Belarus ====
The Belarusian Humanities Lyceum is a private secondary school founded shortly after Belarus' independence from the USSR by intellectuals, such as Vincuk Viacorka and Uladzimir Kolas, with the stated aims of preserving and promoting native Belarusian culture, and raising a new Belarusian elite. It was shut down in 2003 by the Ministry of Education of Belarus allegedly for promoting enmity within Belarusian society and using the classroom as a political soapbox, indoctrinating students with biased views on history, ideology, politics, morality and values. The lyceum eventually switched to homeschooling with a limited number of underground homeschoolers.

==== Czech Republic ====
The term lyceum refers to a type of secondary education consisting of anywhere from four years ended by graduation. It is a type of schooling between grammar school and a technical high school. For example, the famous scientist Gerty Cori went to a lyceum school.

==== Finland ====
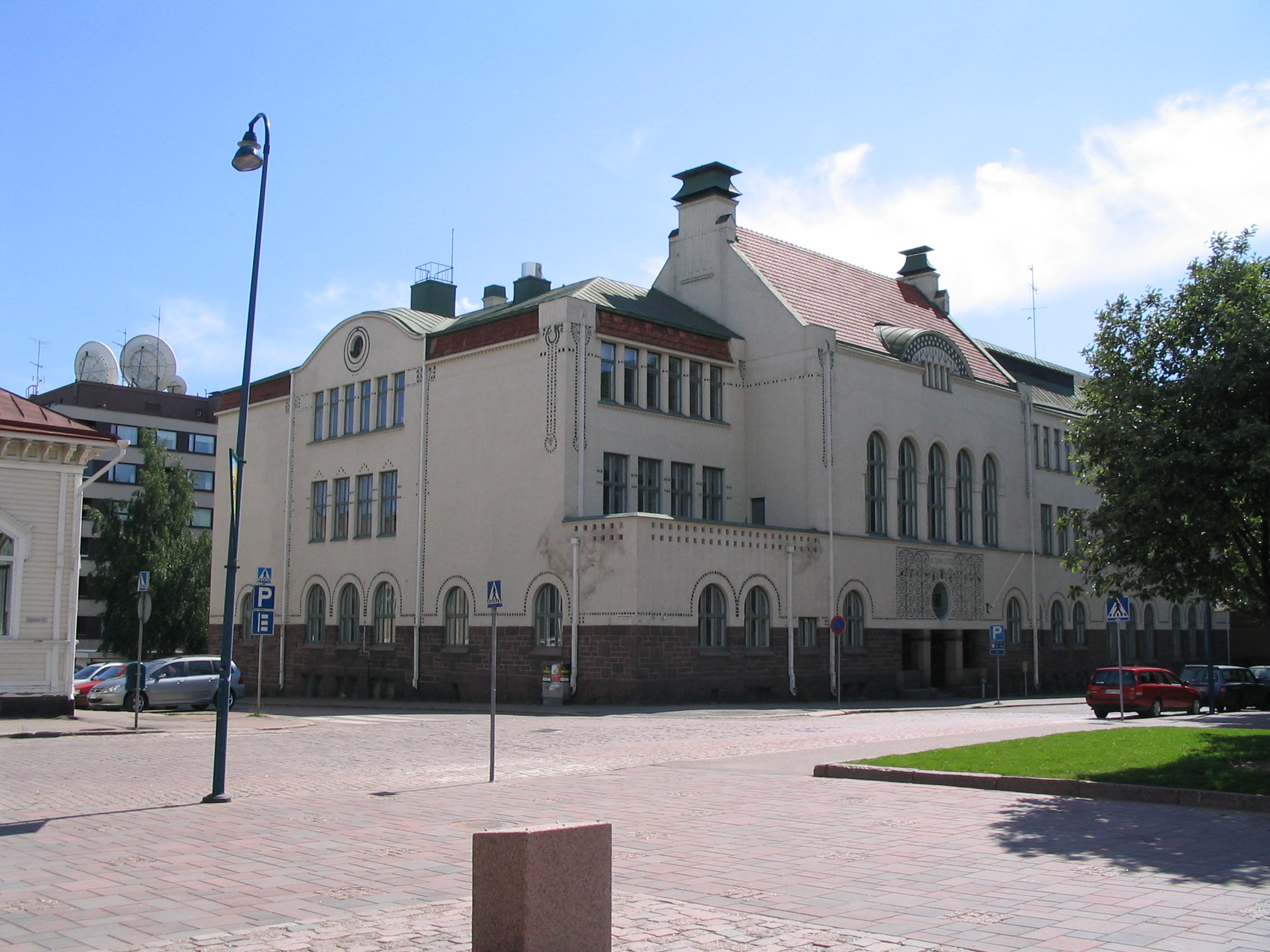
Kotka Lyceum in Kotka, Finland

The concept and name lyceum (in Swedish, lyseo in Finnish) entered Finland through Sweden. Traditionally, lycea were schools to prepare students to enter universities, as opposed to the typical, more general education. Some old schools continue to use the name lyceum, though their operations today vary. For example, Helsinki Normal Lyceum educates students in grades 7–12, while Oulu Lyceum enrolls students only in grades 10–12. The more commonly used term for upper secondary school in Finland is lukio in Finnish and gymnasium in Swedish.

==== France ====
The French word for an upper secondary school, lycée, derives from Lyceum. (see Secondary education in France.)

==== Germany ====
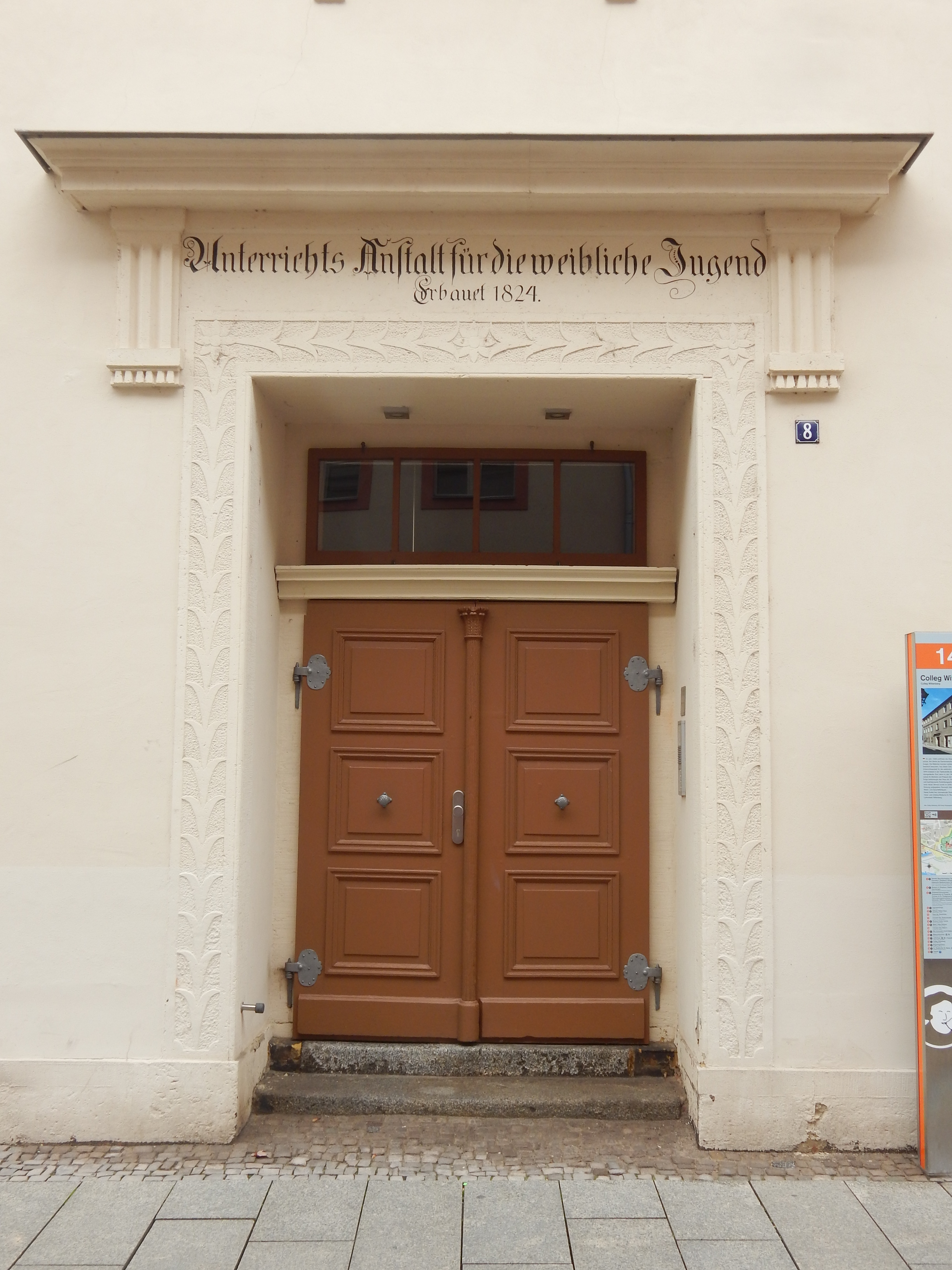
Mädchenschule (Lyzeum) in Wittenberg

The lyceum in Germany was known as an old term for a Gymnasium for girls. In Bavaria it was also a Hochschule to study theology and philosophy.

==== Greece ====
In Greece, Λύκειο refers to a type of upper secondary education school for students aged 15 to 18 or 20. The lyceum school first grade admitted students can have a maximum age up to 20 years old. Evening lyceum (Εσπερινό) is both for adult and underage working students, and lasts three years as of the 2020–2021 academic year, per Law 4547/2018. The lyceum awards the Απολυτήριο, apolytirio or apolyterio, which is the upper secondary education leaving certificate.

===== Upper secondary school (lyceum) =====
- Ειδικό Λύκειο (eidiko lykeio; special lyceum)
- Πρότυπο Λύκειο (protipo lykeio; model lyceum; 2015–present)
- Μουσικό Λύκειο (mousiko lykeio; musical lyceum; 3 years, 1998–present)
- Καλλιτεχνικό Λύκειο (kalitexniko lykeio; art lyceum; 3 years, 2003–present)
- Πειραματικό Λύκειο (peiramtiko lykeio; experimental lyceum; 3 years, 2015–present)
- Γενικό Λύκειο (ΓΕΛ; geniko lykeio; general lyceum; 3 years, 1976–1996, 2006–present)
- Γενικό Λύκειο Διαπολιτισμικής Εκπαίδευσης (ΓΕΛΔΕ; i.e. comprehensive lyceum;
  diapolitismiko lykeio, general lyceum of cross-cultural education; 3 years, 2018–present)
- Eπαγγελματικό Λύκειο (ΕΠΑΛ; epagelmatiko lykeio; vocational lyceum; EPAL; 3 years, 2006–present)
- Εσπερινό Γενικό Λύκειο (esperino geniko lykeio; evening general lyceum; 3 years, 1976–present)
- Εσπερινό Επαγγελματικό Λύκειο (esperino epagelmatiko lykeio; evening vocational lyceum; 3 years)
- Ενιαίο Ειδικό Επαγγελματικό Γυμνάσιο-Λύκειο (integrated special vocational gymnasium-lyceum; ΕΝ.Ε.Ε.ΓΥ-Λ)
- Γενικό Εκκλησιαστικό Λύκειο (ΓΕΕΛ; ekklisiastiko lykeio; ecclesiastical general lyceum; 3 years, 2006–present)

===== Defunct upper secondary school (lyceum) =====
- Αθλητικό Λύκειο (athlitiko lykeio; athletic lyceum; 3 years)
- Ενιαίο Λύκειο (eniaio lykeio; integrated lyceum; 3 years, 1997–2006)
- Τεχνικό Λύκειο (techniko lykeio; technical lyceum; 3 years, 1977–1985)
- Επαγγελματικό Λύκειο (epagelmatiko lykeio; vocational lyceum; 3 years; Law 576/1977; 1977–1985)
- Γυμνάσιο (gymnasium; integrated 3-year lower and 3-year upper secondary school)
- Ενιαίο Πολυκλαδικό Λύκειο (ΕΠΛ; eniaio polykladiko lykeio; integrated multifarious lyceum; 3 years, 1985–1997)
- Τεχνικό Επαγγελματικό Λύκειο (ΤΕΛ; techniko epagelmatiko lykeio; technical vocational lyceum; 3 years, 1985–1998)
- Τεχνικό Επαγγελματικό Εκπαιδευτήριο (ΤΕΕ; techniko epagelmatiko ekpaideftirio; technical vocational training centre; 3 years, 1998–2006)

==== Hungary ====
Before World War I, secondary education institutes with a primary goal of preparing for higher studies were often referred to by the word líceum.

In contemporary Hungarian, the most ubiquitous word for these institutions is gimnázium, but líceum lives on as an archaizing word referring to schools of high prestige and revered traditions, most notably Calvinist boarding schools.

==== Italy ====
The lyceum is often considered the hardest and most prestigious kind of secondary school in Italy.

The term liceo refers to a number of upper secondary school, which last five years (from 14 to 19 years of age) and generally teach more theoretical subjects compared to technical and professional schools (the other two types of Italian high schools), often including Philosophy and Latin. Most Liceo students choose it to prepare for university. It is divided into six different branches, each one specialized in certain subjects:

- Liceo classico (classical lyceum) is focused on the humanities, including history, literature, philosophy, ancient Greek and Latin.
- Liceo scientifico (scientific lyceum) focuses on maths, physics, biology and chemistry.
- Liceo linguistico (linguistic lyceum) focuses on learning a certain number of languages and their literatures. Each school can decide which language to teach, but Italian and English are always present.
- Liceo artistico (arts lyceum) focuses on arts history and practical arts (varying from drawing to painting to sculpturing).
- Liceo delle scienze umane (human and social sciences lyceum) focuses on the human sciences such as psychology, anthropology, sociology and pedagogy and on the study of history and philosophy.
- Liceo musicale e coreutico (music and choreutic lyceum) focuses on musical performance.

==== Latvia ====
The first Lyceum in Riga was founded in 1675 by the king Charles XI of Sweden (in Latin, Schola Carolina), and was renamed to the Imperial Lyceum of Riga (in German, Kaiserliches Lyceum zu Riga) in 1733. In September 1921, the Riga French Lycée, an upper secondary school supported by the Government of France was founded in Riga. In 1989, during the Latvian National Awakening, the Pushkin Lyceum of Riga (Puškina licejs) with education programs in Russian was established. In 2002, another Russian lyceum was established in Daugavpils (Daugavpils Krievu vidusskola - licejs), renamed to Daugavpils High School of Technologies (Daugavpils Tehnoloģiju vidusskola - licejs) in 2020.

==== Lithuania ====
Some gymnasiums are called licėjus, e.g. Vilnius Lyceum.

==== Malta ====
Junior lyceums refer to secondary education state owned schools.

==== Republic of Moldova ====
Until recently, in the Republic of Moldova the lyceum – called liceu – was an educational institution where students studied from the first to the twelfth grade and would obtain the baccalaureate degree upon completion. In most cases, the lyceums were specialized in a particular domain (fine art, theatre, language) that was relevant to the personality whose name the institution bore. In other respects, it was little different from any regular school, with the exception of slightly higher education standards and supposedly being more prestigious. After 2010, regular schools were all formally reformed into lyceums, although their quality remained of the same level as before and most did not get any particular specialization, thereby being dubbed 'theory lyceums' (liceu teoretic). One reason for the 2010 reform was to reduce the influence of the Soviet/Russian educational system and/or mentality in Moldova.

==== Netherlands ====
In the Netherlands, a lyceum is a selective secondary school for children aged 12–18 that offers "voorbereidend wetenschappelijk onderwijs" (vwo) and "hoger algemeen voortgezet onderwijs" (havo), the top and high levels of secondary education available in that country. Successful completion allows vwo students admission to university and havo students to hogeschool, comparable to vocational university. The term lyceum is also sometimes used for other vocational schools such as the Grafisch Lyceum, or Muzieklyceum Amsterdam, which grew into the Conservatorium van Amsterdam.

==== Poland ====
The liceum is the Polish secondary-education school. Polish liceums are attended by students aged 15 to 19–20 (see list below). Before graduating, pupils are subject to a final examination, the matura.

Polish liceums are of several types:

- general lyceum (15–19)
- specialised lyceum (15–19)
- complementary lyceum (17-20)

==== Portugal ====
From 1836 until 1978, in the Portuguese educational system, the lyceum (Portuguese: liceu), or national lyceum (liceu nacional), was a high school that prepared students to enter universities or more general education. On the other hand, the technical school (escola técnica) was a technical-oriented school.

After several education reforms, all these schools merged into a single system of "3rd cycle basic" and secondary schools (escolas básicas do 3.º ciclo e secundárias), offering grades 7 to 12.

==== Romania ====
The Romanian word for lyceum is liceu. It represents a post-secondary form of education. In order for a student to graduate the lyceum and obtain a baccalaureate diploma, they must pass the bac. The lyceum consists of four school years (ages 15–19). Although the lyceum is a pre-university educational institution, it can be enough for the graduates to find a job, mainly in office work.

==== Russia ====
In Imperial Russia, a lyceum was one of the following higher educational facilities: Demidov Lyceum of Law in Yaroslavl (1803), Alexander Lyceum in Tsarskoye Selo (1810), Richelieu Lyceum in Odessa (1817), and Imperial Katkov Lyceum in Moscow (1867).

The Tsarskoye Selo Lyceum was opened on October 19, 1811, in the neoclassical building designed by Vasily Stasov and situated next to the Catherine Palace. The first graduates included Aleksandr Pushkin and Alexander Gorchakov. The opening date was celebrated each year with carousals and revels, and Pushkin composed new verses for each of those occasions. In January 1844 the Lyceum was moved to Saint Petersburg.

During 33 years of the Tsarskoye Selo Lyceum's existence, there were 286 graduates. The most famous of these were Anton Delwig, Wilhelm Küchelbecher, Nicholas de Giers, Dmitry Tolstoy, Yakov Karlovich Grot, Nikolay Yakovlevich Danilevsky, Alexei Lobanov-Rostovsky and Mikhail Saltykov-Shchedrin.

Since the 1990s there are lyceums (special secondary schools) with in-depth study of humanitarian or natural science disciplines. As a rule, university professors teach in lyceums, and the educational system resembles that of a university. Later, the lyceums were renamed special general secondary schools.

==== Serbia ====
The Lyceum of the Principality of Serbia was the first higher education school in Serbia in which education was taught in Serbian. It was founded in 1838 on the initiative of Prince Miloš Obrenović in 1838 in Kragujevac, then the capital of Serbia. When Belgrade became the Serbian capital in 1841, the Serbian Lyceum opened there. In 1863 it became known as the Velika škola until 1905 when it officially changed its name to the University of Belgrade.

==== Turkey ====
The Turkish word for the latest part of pre-university education is lise which is derived from the French word lycée and corresponds to high school in English. It lasts four to five years with respect to the type of the high school. At the end of their lise education, students take the TYT/AYT test, i.e. university entrance examination, to get the right to enroll in a public university or a private university.

==== Ukraine ====
According to the Law of Ukraine "On Education", the lyceum is a level III secondary institution of education (or a structural unit of another institution of education) that provides field-specific secondary education. As it is planned, since 2017 a three-year senior school will be a lyceum of academic or vocational training. In vocational school, a student will master their first profession, whereas in an academic lyceum they will deepen personal knowledge of specific subjects that will be studied further at a higher education establishment. Graduates of academic lyceums will be able to obtain a bachelor's degree in three years (in most specialties) instead of four.

Other types of lyceums in Ukraine include military lyceums and lyceums with intensive military and physical training.

=== North America ===
==== United States ====
See lyceum movement and comparison of US and UK secondary school years (except Scotland).

=== South America ===
==== Chile ====
It is not uncommon in Chile to use the word liceo when referring to a high school. Another term is enseñanza media (secondary education); however, liceo is the most common term due to Chile's extensive European influence.

==== Uruguay ====
Liceo is commonly used to refer to secondary education. It was adopted from the French immigrants of the 19th century.

== See also ==
- Comparison of US and UK Education
- Educational stage
- Gymnasium (school)
- Lyceum (classical)
