= Drenovë Municipality =

Drenovë
- Administrative unit
- Location within Albania
- Coordinates: 40°35′N 20°47′E
- Country: Albania
- County: Korçë
- Municipality: Korçë

Population (2011)
  - Administrative unit: 5,581
- Time zone: UTC+1 (CET)
  - Summer (DST): UTC+2 (CEST)
- Postal Code: 7023
- Area Code: (0)863

Drenovë (Macedonian: Дреново, Drenovo) is a former municipality in the Korçë County, southeastern Albania. At the 2015 local government reform it became a subdivision of the municipality Korçë. The population at the 2011 census was 5,581. The municipal unit consists of the villages Drenovë, Mborje, Boboshticë, Moravë, Qatrom, Ravonik, Turan and Dardhë.

== Notable people ==
- Victor Eftimiu (1889—1972), Albanian-Romanian dramaturg from Boboshticë.
- Aleksander Stavre Drenova (Asdreni) (1872–1947), Albanian poet.
- Eli Fara (1967-now) Albanian singer
