= Drenovë =

Drenovë Ndãrnova Дреново
- Village
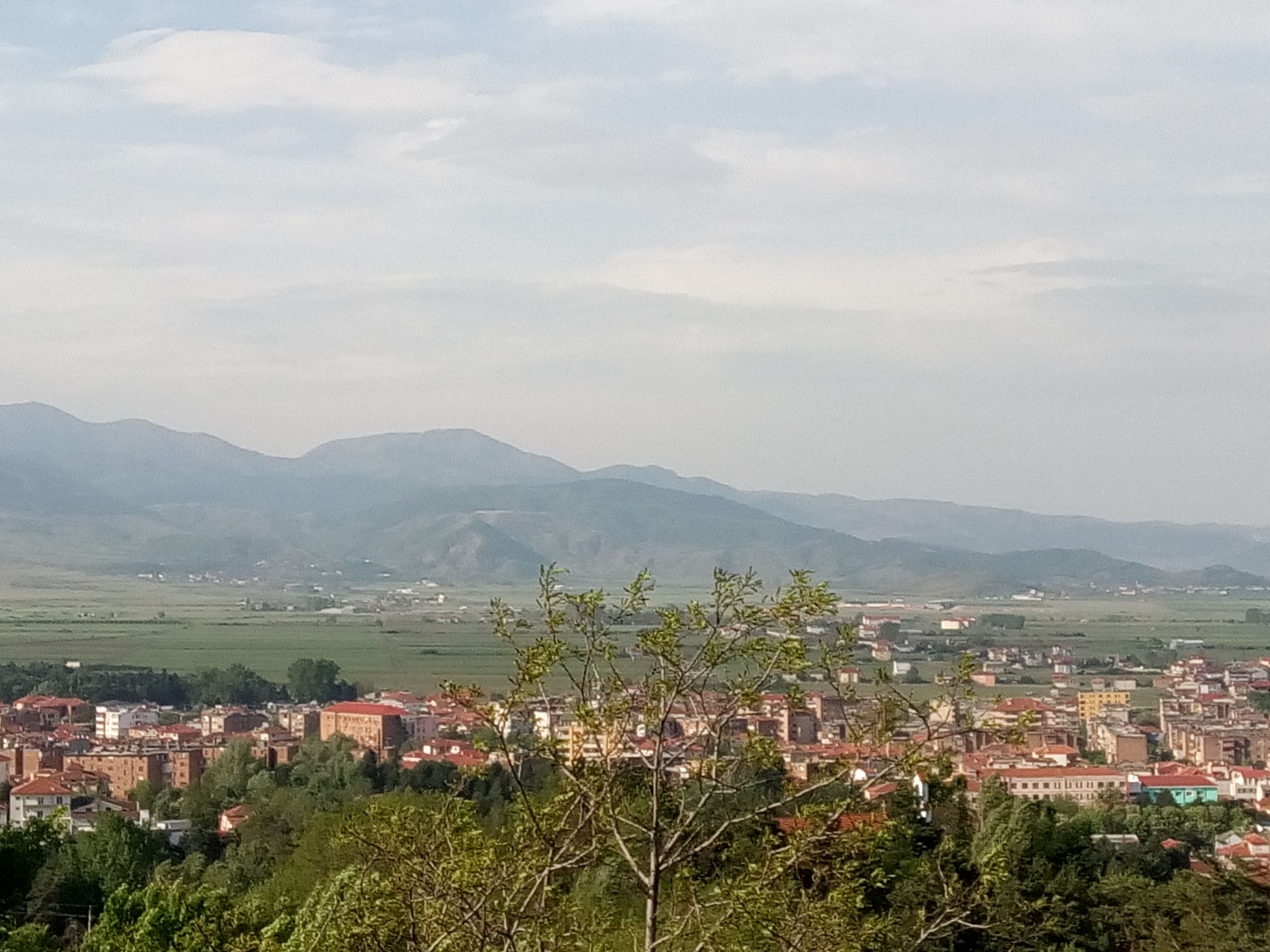
- Drenovë village

- Location within Albania
- Coordinates: 40°35′N 20°47′E
- Country: Albania
- County: Korçë
- Municipality: Korçë
- Administrative unit: Drenovë
- Elevation: 1,112 m (3,648 ft)

Population
  - Total: 2,000
- Time zone: UTC+1 (CET)
  - Summer (DST): UTC+2 (CEST)

Drenovë is a village in the former Drenovë Municipality of the Korçë County in southeastern Albania. After the 2015 local government reform it became part of the municipality Korçë.

== Name ==
The village is known in Aromanian as Ndãrnova, while in Bulgarian and Macedonian it is known as Дреново (Drenovo).

== History ==
According to the French cartographer Alexandre Synvet, the village had 660 Greek Orthodox inhabitants in 1878. Later in 1903, Heinrich Gelzer, following a visit to both Drenkowa and neighbouring Boboshticë, described the local population as a Bulgarian island in Albanian sea, remained from the new nomad migration of Slavic population after Albanian mass emigration from 14th and 15th centuries.

Georgi Traychev wrote in 1911 that the village consisted of 140 households and 678 Bulgarian inhabitants.

== Demographics ==
According to German linguist Gustav Weigand during the first decades of the 20th century Bulgarian populated villages Drenowo and Boboshtitsa were a Slavic linguistic island in Albania. According to some ethnic Macedonian linguists Drenovë and Boboshticë were the only villages in which the Korča dialect of Macedonian was still spoken (as of 1991). The dialect is classified as part of Bulgarian dialects by other authors. Some Bulgarian linguists emphasize that the reflexes of yat in this western Bulgarian dialect is wide, like it is in Eastern Bulgarian dialects. A visit to the village in 2005 by linguists from Sofia University found just two elderly Bulgarian speakers remaining.

During the late 2000s linguists Klaus Steinke and Xhelal Ylli seeking to corroborate villages cited in past literature as being Slavic speaking carried out fieldwork. Drenovë was noted as having a mixed population of Orthodox Albanians and Aromanians with the last elderly speaker of the local Slavic dialect dying in the 2000s. Local Drenovë villagers stated that until the early 1960s, the village only spoke Bulgarian (Bullgarçe) until the arrival of Aromanian settlers to the settlement which resulted in ethnic and linguistic change. Remaining Slavic speaking inhabitants assimilated while others moved away from the village. Some families from the Orthodox village of Cerja in Pustec Municipality, speaking their local Slavic dialect have settled in Drenovë.

== People from Drenovë ==
- Aleksandër Stavre Drenova, poet and author of the national hymn of Albania
