= Sotir Kuneshka =

Albanian physicist and academic

Prof. Dr. Sotir Kuneshka (Tsabit Kheiva)
- Born: 15 July 1912; Boboshticë, Korçë, Ottoman Empire
- Died: 1991; Tirana, Albania
- Occupations: Physicist, academic
- Known for: Father of Albanian physics studies and research
- Awards: First Class Naim Frashëri Order "Mësues i Popullit" (People's Teacher)

Sotir Kuneshka (15 July 1912 – 1991) was an Albanian physicist and academic. He is remembered as the first to perform physics studies in Albania, the founder of the Natural Sciences Faculty of the University of Tirana (UT), the first physicist to become member of the Academy of Sciences of Albania, and the author of the base academic texts of physics in Albanian.

== Early life and education ==
Kuneshka was born on 15 July 1912 in Boboshticë near Korçë, son of a local schoolteacher. After finishing the elementary school in his village, he register in the Albanian National Lyceum (known as the French Lyceum) of nearby Korçë in 1924. There he would study for 9 years. Due to financial difficulties, he had to commute back and forth every day, a total of 14 km daily. This did not affect his passion of studying or his results. In fact, he stood out among the other students, especially in exact sciences. Despite the results, the Albanian government of that time did not assign him a scholarship for attending college. To his luck, the French scholar and slavist André Mazon visited his village for studying the local Slavic dialect spoken by some of the villagers. He was hosted in Kuneshka's home who actually interpreted for him. With the intervention of Mazon and the director of the French Lyceum, Kuneshka obtained half scholarship from the French government, and went to study physics in the University of Sorbonne in France.

To fully support his studies, Kuneshka gave private courses on physics to high school students, and lectured on Albanian grammar in the Oriental School of Paris. Kuneshka graduated in physics in 3 years. In 1936, he obtained the "License d’enseignement", license for teaching mathematics, physics, general chemistry, and rational mechanics.

== Career ==
=== Director of French Lyceum and World War II ===
The same year, in 1936, he applied for the certification on Applied mechanics and electromagnetism. In 1937, he was called back by the Minister of Education of Albania, and was appointed director of the French Lyceum. He kept that position until 1940. In August 1940, during the Fascist Italy occupation, he had to leave that position because his records shows he hadn't fulfilled the military service. He was sent in Pesaro in a school for artillery. This was a harsh period for due to isolation and lack of contacts. Few letters that managed to receive were always rare and censured. With the Allied invasion of Italy, his military studies were interrupted. In early 1944, he went south to Bari, trying to find a way to return to Albania. Meanwhile, he kept giving private science lessons to support living. An Albanian military delegation encountered him and brought him back home.

=== Reformation of the Albanian school system and higher education ===
Soon after the end of WWII, the French Lyceum reopened and he was appointed director. Nevertheless, he did not keep this position for longs since he bigger tasks were assigned to him. The Ministry of Education put him in charge of the Albanian school system. Beside that, Albania needed a full education system reformation. One of his successful tasks was leading the commission for establishing the High Pedagogical Institute (Albanian: Instituti i Lartë Pedagogjik). This institute marked the start of the higher education in Albania, which had been missing till then. In 1948 he was assigned as lecturer in the Institute, and 1 year later became its director. In 1951, the 4-year curriculum Pedagogical Institute was established in Tirana; he served as deputy director until 1957 when the University of Tirana was established.

=== First dean of the Natural Sciences Faculty of the University of Tirana ===
Kuneshka served as the first dean of the Natural Sciences Faculty of the University of Tirana (1957–1958), first chairman of the physics catedra of it (1957), and remained part of its academic staff until his retirement in 1982.

=== Author ===
Kuneshka was the key person in the process of improving the physics teaching curriculum in the Albanian schools. He was also the author of the very first textbooks of physics, as Kurs i fizikës së përgjithshme (General physics course) in 1974, Kurs i mekanikës teorike (Theoretical mechanics course) of 1981, etc. He performed studies in the field of natural radioactivity of the waters systems. As a direct result of his persistent work, the first work group of physicist was established in Albania. The first scientific article on physics written in Albanian Scientific Bulletin of the University of Tirana bears his name as author.

== Awards ==
Kuneshka did not engage in politics, and was not part of any political instance. Due only to his work and diligence, he received several titles and awards:

- "Medalje Pune" (Medal of Work)
- "Urdhër Pune i kl. II" (Second Class Order of Work)
- "Mësues i Merituar" (Merited Teacher)
- "Urdhri Naim Frashëri i kl. I" (First Class Naim Frashëri Order)
- "Mësues i Popullit" (People's Teacher)
- "Qytetar Nderi" (Honorary citizenship) from the Municipality of Korçë in 1999
