= Vedat Kokona =

Albanian translator, writer and lexicologist

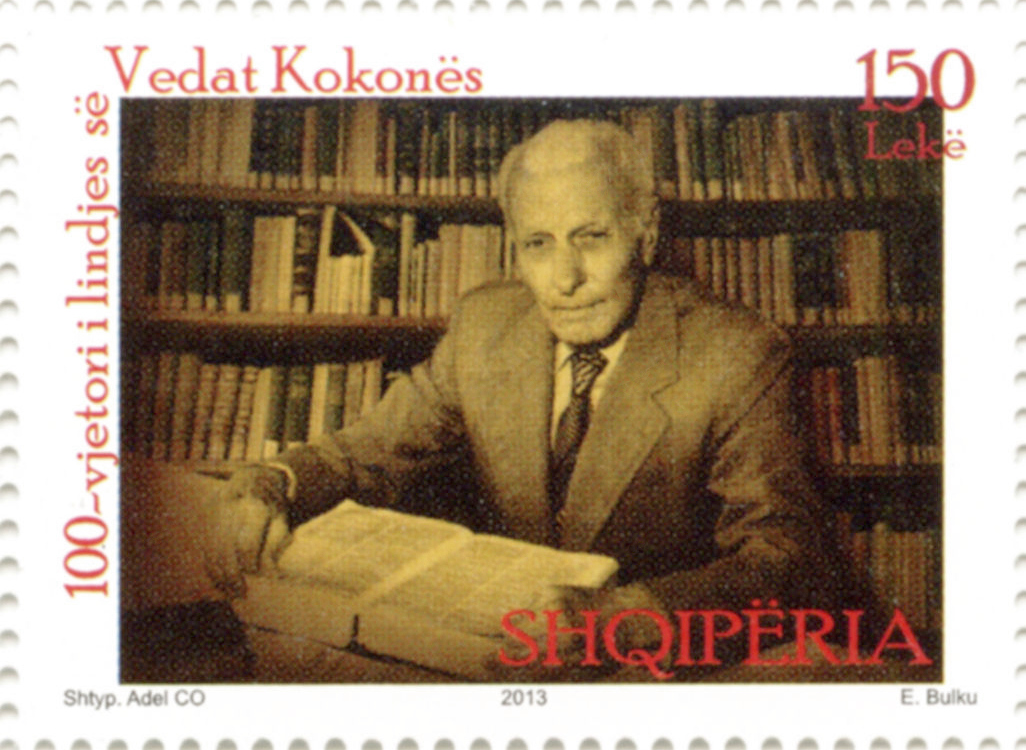
- Kokona on a 2013 stamp of Albania
- Born: August 7, 1913; İzmir, Ottoman Empire
- Died: October 14, 1998 (aged 85)
- Occupations: Translator, writer, lexicologist

Vedat Kokona (August 7, 1913 – October 14, 1998) was an Albanian translator, writer and lexicologist of the 20th century, well known for his dual dictionaries English-Albanian and French-Albanian and his contributions in Albanian lexicology and lexicography.

== Early life ==
Kokona was born on August 7, 1913, in Izmir, Ottoman Empire, to an Albanian intellectual family, originating from Gjirokastra, Albania. His father, Elmaz, was a lawyer and a judge of the Ottoman Empire. Upon the family moving to Albania in 1920, he followed the primary school in Tirana. He finished in 1935 the Korçë Lyceum, then pursued higher studies in law in Paris, France.

== Teaching years ==
After his law studies Kokona was appointed to the Civil Court of Krujë, which office he did not accept. Subsequently, he was appointed as a teacher of Albanian in the Korçë Lyceum. There, Kokona was distinguished as a gifted teacher. Subsequently, in the early 1940s he was appointed at the Gymnasium of Tirana.

During the fascist invasion, when Kokona worked as a teacher, he was required to spy on the students and to deal with work that he could not accept due to his principles and character. This was the reason why he felt that he had to resign from the teaching profession. After World War II he went back to the Gymnasium of Tirana, now "Qemal Stafa" High School. In 1949 he was appointed as an editor and translator in the publishing house "Naim Frasheri" and as a professor of French at the University of Tirana, where he taught until retirement.

== Work ==
Vedat Kokona devoted most of life and work to French language. He was one of the best lexicologues of this language. He worked on and published different French-Albanian and Albanian-French dictionaries and also English-Albanian dictionaries. His first dictionary was published in 1932. His last dictionary is a 40-thousand words work.

He is one of the most important Albanian authors in lexicology and lexicography.

Kokona is one of the most renowned translators from French, Italian, English and Russian. He has made significant contributions in translation of poetry and prose by translating about 15,000 verses from the poetry of the world into Albanian.

== Recognition ==
Vedat Kokona holds numerous titles, orders and decorations. He holds a PhD "Honoris causa" from the University of Tirana and also is Knight of the Order of Arts and Letters, and Officer of the Order of the Academic Palms, two orders of chivalry, awarded by the French Government.
