= St. Demetrius' Church, Boboshticë =

Cultural monument in Albania

Coordinates: 40.5569°N 20.7592°E

St. Demetrius' Church
- Kisha e Shën Mitrit (Albanian)
- Interactive map of St. Demetrius' Church
- Location: Boboshticë

Cultural Monument of Albania

St. Demetrius' Church (Albanian: Kisha e Shën Mitrit) is a church in Boboshticë, Korçë County, Albania. It is a Cultural Monument of Albania.
