= St. John's Church, Boboshticë =

Church in Boboshticë, Albania

Coordinates: 40.5558°N 20.7603°E

St. John's Church
- Kisha e Shën Jovanit (Albanian)
- Interactive map of St. John's Church
- Location: Boboshticë

Cultural Monument of Albania

St. John's Church (Albanian: Kisha e Shën Jovanit) is a church in Boboshticë, Korçë County, Albania. It is a Cultural Monument of Albania.
