= Boboshticë =

Boboshticë Bubushtitsa Бобощица, Бобоштица
- Village
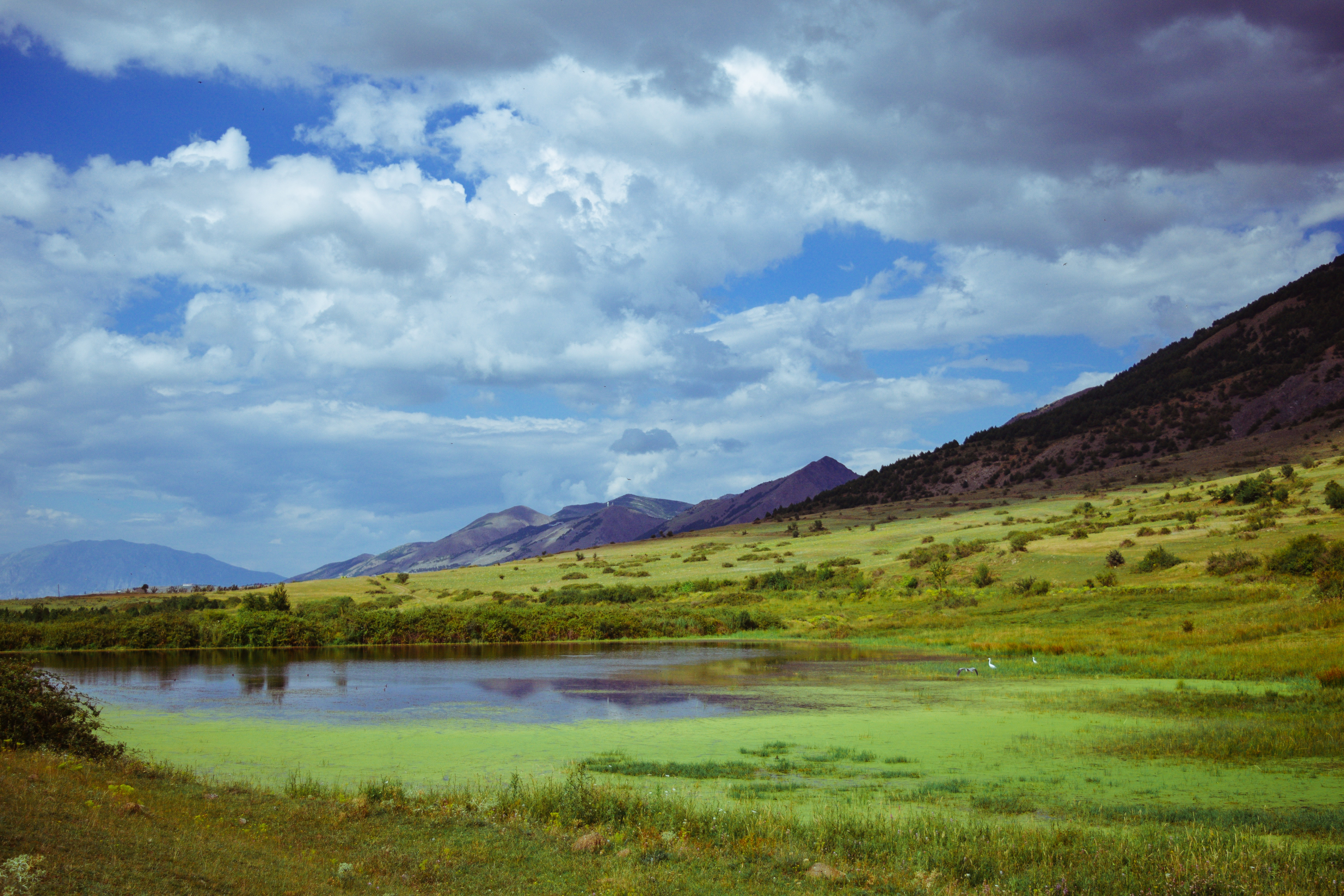
- Landscape in Boboshticë

- Location within Albania
- Coordinates: 40°33′15″N 20°45′52″E
- Country: Albania
- County: Korçë
- Municipality: Korçë
- Administrative unit: Drenovë
- Elevation: 1,112 m (3,648 ft)

Population (2005)
  - Total: 1,200
- Time zone: UTC+1 (CET)
  - Summer (DST): UTC+2 (CEST)

Boboshticë is a village in the former Drenovë Municipality of the Korçë County in southeastern Albania. At the 2015 local government reform it became part of the municipality Korçë.

== Name ==
The name of the village is a Slavic toponym, recognizable with the Slavic suffix ice.

The village is known in Aromanian as Bubushtitsa, in Bulgarian as Бобощица (Boboshtitsa), and in Macedonian as Бобоштица (Boboštica).

== History ==
According to legend, the village was founded by Polish settlers left behind after a Crusade. It is believed that the local church of Saint John the Forerunner was most probably built in the 13th century and it was rebuilt and expanded later. In 1503 a new church in the monastery St. Nicholas near to the village was built on whose western wall, in a Greek language inscription the slavic names of donors were mentioned - Bogdan, Chelko, Valcho and Telche, and the paintings were a donation of Petros Chartophylax.

The village was internally ruled by a "council of elders" led by a person from one of the richest families, referred as Kodjabashis.

In 1823, for unclassified reasons, Boboshticë suffered a high level of mortality. 23 people are recorded to have died from the nearby monastery of St. Nicholas (Albanian: Shën Kollit), while 325 in total from the area.

A considerable number of the local population, though not of Greek origin, participated in the Greek War of Independence (1821-1830) and supported the Greek side. Six locals fell during the Siege of Messolonghi. Two uncles of the well-known Romanian author Victor Eftimiu participated in future anti-Ottoman wars.

A Greek elementary school was already operating during the 1873-1874 school season. Greek education was expanded with the creation of a kindergarten in 1888.

In 1873 the residents of Boboshtica wrote a request to the Bulgarian Exarch Antim I, written in Greek letters in the local dialect. They expressed their Bulgarian affiliation and provided a general information about their village. Boboshchitsa had 150 houses and was divided into five neighborhoods: Popchìshche, Chelkoveàne, Bràtsko, Bùnar and Dòlno Bùnar. The rivers that crossed the village were named: Goleàma reàka (Big river), Màla reàka (Little river) and Pòvrok. The main problem the village faced was to buy the village lands back from the Ottoman state.

In 1878-1879, many diaspora members together with local villagers took the initiative of buying village lands back from the Ottoman Empire, 57 years after they had been turned into imlak, based on the new imperial laws which allowed the Christians to buy/sell land and similar properties. The diaspora managed to have to the support of Russian diplomat Ignatyev for this purpose. Ignatyev succeeded in convincing the Ottoman authorities to add Boboshticë (and Drenovë) to the list of Ottoman çifliks which were destined to auction. At this time the village is recorded to have had 1004 people. The community distributed financial obligations (debentures) written in Bulgarian, Romanian, and Greek in order to facilitate the fund-raising.

According to the Bulgarian Exarchate, Boboshticë had 250 houses with 1,471 Bulgarian inhabitants in the early 20th century. Also around this time, in 1903, German scholar Heinrich Gelzer visited the village and described the local population as a Bulgarian island in an Albanian sea, remained from the old Slavic population before Albanian mass migration from the 14th and 15th centuries.

During the Greco-Italian War in World War II, the strategic pass that led to the village changed hands several times in November 1940 but was finally taken by the Greek army after continuous pressure. The headquarters of the V Corps of the Greek army was stationed in the village.

The villagers of Boboshticë-Drenovë have been a substantial part of the Albanian community in Romania. Their names appear on the statutes of the main organizations of Albanian diaspora there, with a great contribute in the Albanian National Awakening. Such societies were "Diturija", "Drenova", "Boboshtani" etc. Thanas Kantili (1863-1933) from Boboshticë was vice-president of the "Diturija" society, and a delegate of the community to the Albanian Congress of Trieste in 1913.

== Demographics ==
The majority of the population of the village was Bulgarian until 1960. Then the mass migration of Aromanians ("Vlachs") began, while the old local population migrated to the cities in Albania.

According to some scientists, Boboshticë and the neighboring Drenovë were the only villages in which the Korča dialect of the Macedonian language was still spoken, as of 1991. According to linguist Xhelal Ylli, following a visit to the village in 2005, only five or six speakers remained living in the village. The dialect is classified as part of Bulgarian dialects by other authors. Some Bulgarian linguists emphasize that the reflexes of yat in this western Bulgarian dialect is wide, like it is in Eastern Bulgarian dialects.

Dhimitër Theodhor Canco (Dimitar Tsantso) was a teacher from the village who wrote the historical "Memorandia", a collection of orally transmitted historical facts, as well as documentary facts. The "Memorandia" was written in Greek. The original copy belongs to the author's family. It was copied by two of Canco's nephews and the copy is part of the Albanian Archives. In his memoirs, written in Greek, Canco defined the local villagers as Orthodox Christians who speak a Bulgarian dialect. André Mazon, an expert in Slavic studies, has published an exceptional source of information in his Documents slaves de l'Albanie de Sud, II, pieces complemetaires (Paris, Institut d'Etudes Slaves, 1965), for which Bulgarian scholar Maria Filipova made the translation from Greek to French.
Mazon also published seventeen correspondence letters written by Mihal Kuneshka, a villager, dating back to the late 19th century. All are in the Bulgarian language, proving the existence of the Slavic element. Mazon included as well sixteen letters written in French by Victor Efitimiu, which describe old legends and oral traditions leading to the village's assumed origin, as well as much third-party information from other authors.

In 2005, a Greek-language school was again operating in the village. At the same time, controversies rose regarding testimonies that the Greek government was paying people to declare themselves as Greek and register as North Epirotes, in attempts to Hellenize the area. A memorial was built to commemorate Greek soldiers fallen during the Greco-Italian War. Disagreements between some villagers and representatives of the Omonia organisation rose because of allegations that the construction personnel violated the village cemetery while building the memorial. This led to a one-year long imprisonment sentence for Omonia's leader in Korça, Naum Disho, however his sentence was removed by the Korçe's Court of Appeal.

Today, the majority of the villagers identify as Aromanians and many have received Greek citizenship from the Greek government, together with pensions for elderly people. The village is also referred as one of the Aromanian villages in Albania.

During the late 2000s linguists Klaus Steinke and Xhelal Ylli carried out fieldwork, seeking to corroborate information about villages cited in past literature as being Slavic-speaking. Boboshticë was noted as having a population of Aromanians with only a few remnants left of its former Slavic-speaking population. During the early 1960s Aromanians settled in Boboshticë, which resulted in an ethnic and linguistic change of demographics of the population in the village.

In the 2010s, only one elderly women remains in Boboshticë who is a speaker of the village's local Macedonian dialect called Kajnas (of us).

== Religious monuments ==
The village is home to the Church of Saint Demetrius and of Saint John the Forerunner. Both churches have been declared Cultural Monuments of Albania.

Until the 1960s two Orthodox monasteries were active next to Boboshticë; the Monastery of Saint Nicholas (Albanian: Shën Kollit) on the east, and Monastery of the Dormition of the Theotokos (Albanian: Shën Mërisë) on the south.
The monasteries had dedicated guest rooms for hosting pilgrims from other areas of the Balkans during religious feasts and events. The St. Mary monastery had a Prilepska room for guest coming from Prilep area (Albanian: Përlep), and an Ohridska for guests coming from Ohrid area (Albanian: Ohri). Saint Nicholas was a stauropegic monastery, it was destroyed during the atheistic policies by the authorities of the People's Republic of Albania, but now has been restored.

== People from Boboshticë ==
- Gjergj Bubani (1899-1954), writer and publicist
- Victor Eftimiu, Romanian poet and playwright
- Thanas Kantili, Rilindas, vice-president of "Diturija" society in Bucharest
- Sotir Kuneshka, physicist and academic
- Archbishop Liolin (born in NY, family originating from Boboshticë)
- Vani Trako (1923-2009), actor
