= Pandi Geço =

Albanian geographer

- Born: 1913; Korçë, Albania
- Died: 1994 (aged 80–81); Tirana, Albania
- Education: University of Sorbonne, Paris, France
- Known for: Geographical regionalization of Albania
- Scientific career
- Fields: Geography, Demography, Urban geography, Economic geography
- Workplaces: Pedagogue of geography in the Albanian National Lyceum Scientific worker in the Institute of Studies Professor in the Department of Geodesy in the High Pedagogical Institute of Tirana Chief of the Department of Geography of the Faculty of Civil Engineering in the Polytechnic University of Tirana

Pandi Geço (1913–1994) was an Albanian geographer. He was best known for his unique regionalization of Albania into four physical-geographic regions, a regionalization proposed for the first time by him and still used today. He was also the author of the first Albanian academic textbooks of geography.

== Early life and higher education ==
Pandi Geço was born in Korçë, Albania in 1913, the only son of Niko Geço and Katerina Ballauri. He received his primary education in his hometown, Korçë, where he continued his secondary and tertiary education in French language at the Albanian National Lyceum. In 1935 he completed his studies in the Lyceum and went to study geography in Paris, France. He graduated from the University of Sorbonne in 1940 and that same year returned to his hometown in Albania, where was appointed pedagogue at the same Lyceum at which he had studied.

== Career ==
Eventually he moved to Tirana and from 1948 until 1951 he worked in the first post-war Albanian scientific institution, the Institute of Studies (Albanian: Instituti i Studimeve), later called the Institute of Sciences (Albanian: Instituti i Shkencave).

In 1951 he moved into the academic didactic system as professor of geography at the High Pedagogical Institute of Tirana. From 1956–1959 he was a member of the Department of Geodesy in the Faculty of Civic Engineering.

Between the years 1959–1965 Geço was chief of the Department of Geography of the Faculty of Civil Engineering at the Polytechnic University of Tirana and gave lectures until 1974, the year he retired from teaching.

He also conducted scientific research and published several articles concerning the regionalization of Albania, climatology, demographics, urban geography, and economic geography. Of particular importance is his study Contemplations on the geographical regionalization of Albania (Albanian: Mendime për rajonizimin gjeografik të Shqipërisë), where, for the first time, Pandi proposed a unique geographical regionalization of Albania, based on the concepts of integral geography. He divided Albania into four physical-geographic regions: Albanian Alps, Central Mountain Region, Southern Mountain Region and Coastal Lowlands. This regionalization system is still used today.

Geço held the title Professor and published several geographic academic textbooks, analyzing in detail the demographic evolution of the Albanian urban and rural settlements, particularly the capital Tirana. He was also involved in cultural exchanges with French scientific teams in Albania due to his high academic profile and proficiency in French.

After a long career in the field of geography, Geço died in November 1994 in Tirana, at the age of 81.

== Notable works ==
Pandi Geço published several works in both Albanian and French, as well as academic textbooks of geography:

- Shqipëria – pamje fiziko-ekonomike (English: Albania: a physical-economic survey), 1959
- Gjeografia fizike e Shqipërisë (English: Physical geography of Albania), 1963 It was eventually translated and published in 1961 in the United States by the same title.
- Mendime për rajonizimin gjeografik të Shqipërisë (English: Contemplations on the geographical regionalization of Albania), 1964
- Gjeografia ekonomike e Shqipërisë (English: Economic geography of Albania), 1970
- Fjalor i termave të gjeografisë: shqip-rusisht-frëngjisht (English: Dictionary of the terms of geography: Albanian-Russian-French), coauthor with F. Leka and L. Dodbiba, 1975
- In "Studime Historike":

- Tendenca e zhvillimit të forcave prodhuese në RPSH, e parë ne planin historiko-gjeografik (English: Development tendency of the productive forces in the People's Republic of Albania, seen from the historical-geographic plan), 1972
- Disa aspekte të evolucionit të qytetit shqiptar gjatë shek. XX (English: Some aspects on the evolution of Albanian town during the 20th century), 1975/4
- Disa aspekte të evolucionit të popullsisë fshatare të RPSSH (English: Some aspects on the evolution of countryside population of the Socialist People's Republic of Albania), 1977/4

- In "Ethnographie albanaise":

- L'accroissement de la population urbaine dans la République Populaire d'Albanie et sa nouvelle répartition géographique (English: The growth of urban population in the People's Republic of Albania and its new geographic distribution), 1976

- In "Studime Gjeografike":

- Një vështrim i shkurtër fiziko-gjeografik mbi Ultësirën e Shkodrës (English: Short physical-geographic survey on Shkodra Lowland), 1985

== Legacy ==
Geço is credited for writing the first Albanian geographic textbooks for universities, while his unique regionalization of Albania is still used today. In honour of his scientific contribution to the Albanian geography, the Albanian Association of Geographers led by Prof. Arqile Bërxholi bears the name "Pandi Geço" (Albanian: Shoqata Shqiptare e Gjeografëve "Pandi Geço").
