= Raqi Qirinxhi High School =

- Shkolla e Mesme Raqi Qirinxhi
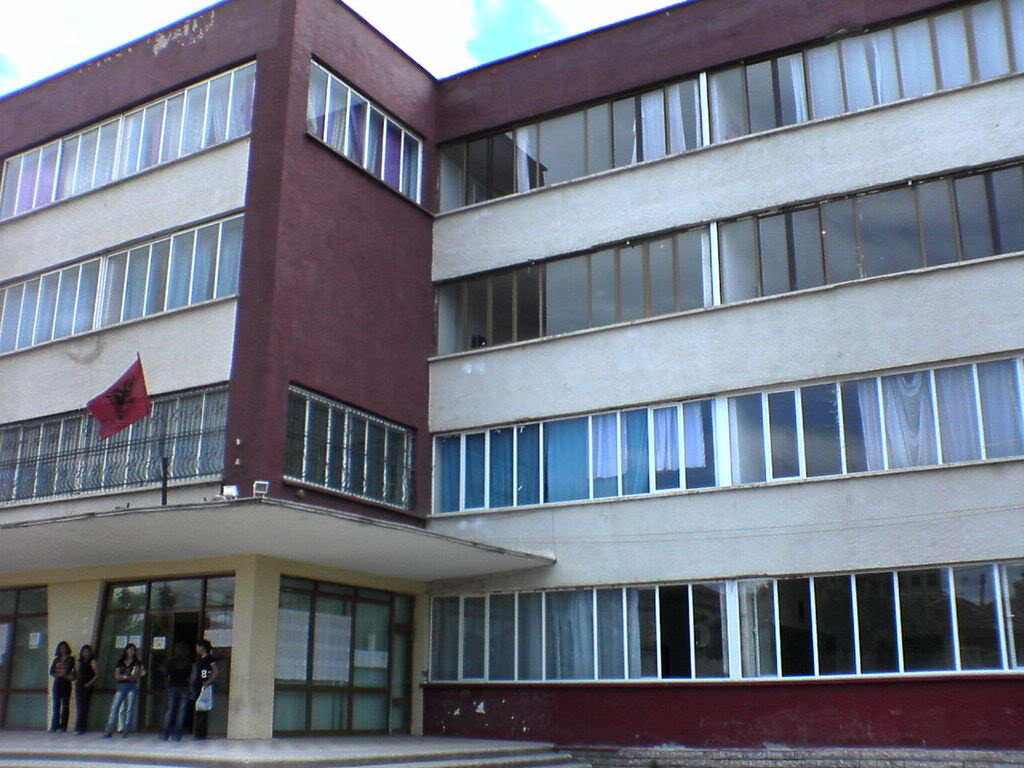

Location
- Rruga "Pano Xhamballo", Nr. 10; Korçë; Albania
- Coordinates: 40.625259°N 20.780184°E

Information
- Former name: Albanian National Lyceum
- School type: Public High School High School
- Established: 1917
- Status: Active
- Grades: 10-12
- Language: Albanian
- Slogan: Mbi te gjitha Atdheu.
- Team name: Raqistat
- Rival: Themistokli Gërmenji High School
- Website: [Shkollaraqiqirinxhi.edupage.org/]

Raqi Qirinxhi High School (Albanian: Shkolla e mesme Raqi Qirinxhi) is a three-year public high school in the town of Korçë, Albania. It is one of the few schools in Albania where in some of the classes students learn French as first language and in some others the students learn Italian. In 2015 a new soccer, basketball, volleyball and tennis field was added to the school as part of the Community Schools Project. It was called Albanian National Lyceum from 1917 to 1939.

== History ==
The Raqi Qirinxhi High School's history starts with the Lyceum of Korça. The Lyceum opened its doors on 25 October 1917 as the French Lyceum with the decision of the government of the Autonomous Region of Korçë. In 1921 it was renamed to National Lyceum. It was a secular school where all the subjects were in the French language with the exception of the Albanian language.

During World War II, many students of the school joined the youth ranks of the Communist Party of Albania. Following this activity, the fascist regime closed the school. As a result of this decision, which many students found unjust, 150 of them joined the ranks of the Albanian liberation movement after a meeting in Voskopoje. Overall, 384 students of the school joined the liberation movement, out of which 54 died while fighting the fascist and Nazi enemies. Three of them have been declared People's Heroes of Albania by the Albanian government for extraordinary acts of bravery. After 1944, the re-opened school was named after former alumnus and teacher Raqi Qirinxhi, People's Teacher of Albania.

Nowadays Raqi Qirinxhi High School is one of the highest ranking high schools of Albania. In 2015 it had a coefficient of 1.4. It is one of the few schools in Albania where in some of the classes students learn French as the first language.

== Athletics ==
In 2015 a new soccer, basketball, volleyball and tennis field was added to the school as part of the Community School Project.

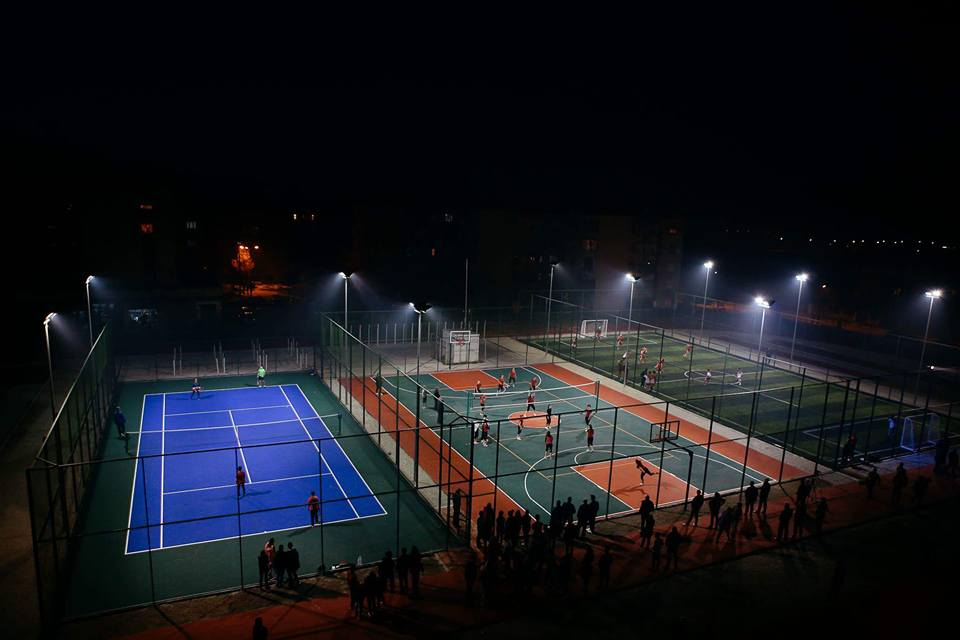
Raqi Qirinxhi High School's athletics fields.

The school also has an inside soccer field which is used in winter. It is also used for vote-counting in election years.

== Architecture ==
It is a four floor building with a museum, library, soccer field etc.
