= Aleksandër Stavre Drenova =

Albanian poet, writer and activist

Asdreni
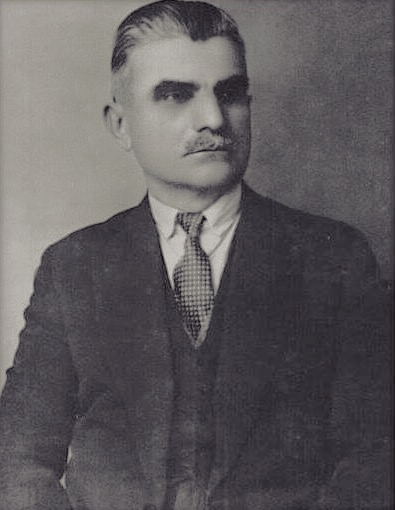
- Portrait of Asdreni, 1938
- Born: Aleksandër Stavre Drenova; 11 April 1872; Drenovë, Ottoman Empire (present day Albania)
- Died: 11 December 1947 (aged 75); Bucharest, Romania
- Occupations: Poet; rilindas; translator; writer
- Relatives: Stavri Thimiu (father)
- Writing career
- Pen name: Asdreni
- Language: Albanian; Romanian
- Genres: Realism; Romanticism
- Literary movement: Albanian Renaissance

Aleksandër Stavre Drenova (pronounced [alɛkˈsandəɾ staˈvɾɛ dɾɛˈnova]; 11 April 1872 – 11 December 1947), commonly known by the pen name Asdreni, was an Albanian poet, rilindas, translator, writer and the author of the poem which later became the national anthem of Albania. He is regarded as one of the most influential Albanian writers of the 20th century and composed most of his Albanian Renaissance-inspired known works during that period.

Born in the village of Drenovë, Asdreni completed his academic studies at the University of Bucharest in Romania where he enthusiastically committed himself to the Independence of Albania from the Ottoman Empire. He maintained close liaison with fellow Gjergj Fishta and Lasgush Poradeci and was notably inspired by the patriots Girolamo de Rada and Naim Frashëri.

Rreze dielli, a collection of 99 poems, was his first prominent work which he dedicated to the national hero of Albania Gjergj Kastrioti Skanderbeg. Devoted to Edith Durham a friend of Albania, his second collection of again 99 poems, Ëndrra e lotë, displayed a wider range of themes and motifs as well as his more astonishing maturity.

On the 30th of June 2021 the new 10000 Lekë banknote was issued by the Bank of Albania with the main portrait being that of Asdreni.

== Biography ==
=== Life and career ===
Asdreni was born as Aleksandër Stavre Drenova on 11 April 1872 into an Albanian peasant family of Eastern Orthodox faith in the village of Drenovë close to the city of Korçë in what was then part of the Ottoman Empire and is now Albania. In his native village he properly received his early formal education at a Greek primary school and had just started secondary school in Korçë subsequently his father, Stavri Thimiu, died leaving him fatherless.

The surrounding region Korçë had been a prime source of Albanian migration which was additionally strengthened by an earthquake in 1879. He consequently migrated to Bucharest in 1885 and rejoined his more elderly brothers where he also commenced his short-living studies at the Faculty of Political Science of the University of Bucharest.

In the new country, Asdreni came into liaison with other Albanian intellectuals and writers with whom he started to strengthen the Albanian diaspora in Romania for the struggle of national liberation. Prior to that, he was strongly inspired by Girolamo de Rada and Naim Frashëri as well as by the Albanian Renaissance in which the Albanians came to acknowledge themselves as a nation deserving the right to govern themselves.

Asdreni died in 1947 in Bucharest. He was initially buried there, at the Sfânta Vineri Cemetery (where Nikolla Naço is also buried), but his remains were brought to Albania and buried in Drenovë in 1974.

== Literature ==
=== Writings and publication ===
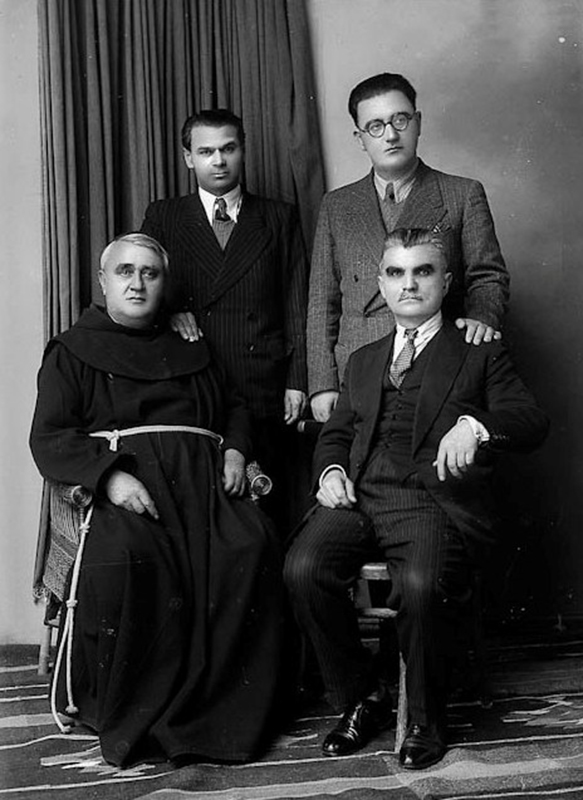
Asdreni with his fellows Lasgush Poradeci, Ernest Koliqi and Gjergj Fishta. They are all among the most influential Albanian writers of the 20th century.

The literary career of Asdreni blossomed simultaneously with the beginning of the 20th century. In his first work, a collection of 99 poems known as the Rreze dielli dedicated to the Albanian national hero Skanderbeg who led a successful resistance to Ottoman expansion into Europe, he followed the literary traditions of Naim Frashëri and raised his love for the motherland encouraging his compatriots to enter the struggle for liberation from the Ottoman Empire.

Ëndrra e lotë, his second work also composed of 99 poems dedicated to Edith Durham who travelled extensively across Albania, is characterised by a wealth of poetic values. He instantly expressed his democratic values, his interests in societal problems at the time as well as his critical discourses on foreign domination. It was an important step from Romanticism towards Realism which was characterised by the historical time frame and reference, and writing about events and situations that happened in real life.

His poem "Kënga e bashkimit" (The Song of Unity), published in the volume Ëndrra [dh]e lotë ("Dreams and tears", 1912), is a clear adaptation of the Romanian song "Hora Unirii" by Vasile Alecsandri.

== See also ==
- List of Albanian writers
- National anthem of Albania
- Albanians of Romania
