= Victor Eftimiu =

Romanian poet and playwright (1889 - 1972)

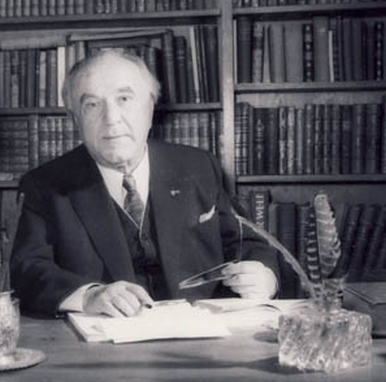
- Born: January 24, 1889; Boboshticë, Albania
- Died: November 27, 1972 (aged 83); Bucharest, Socialist Republic of Romania
- Resting place: Bellu Cemetery, Bucharest
- Occupations: Poet, playwright
- Spouse: Agepsina Macri
- Writing career
- Language: Romanian
- Notable awards: Legion of Honour

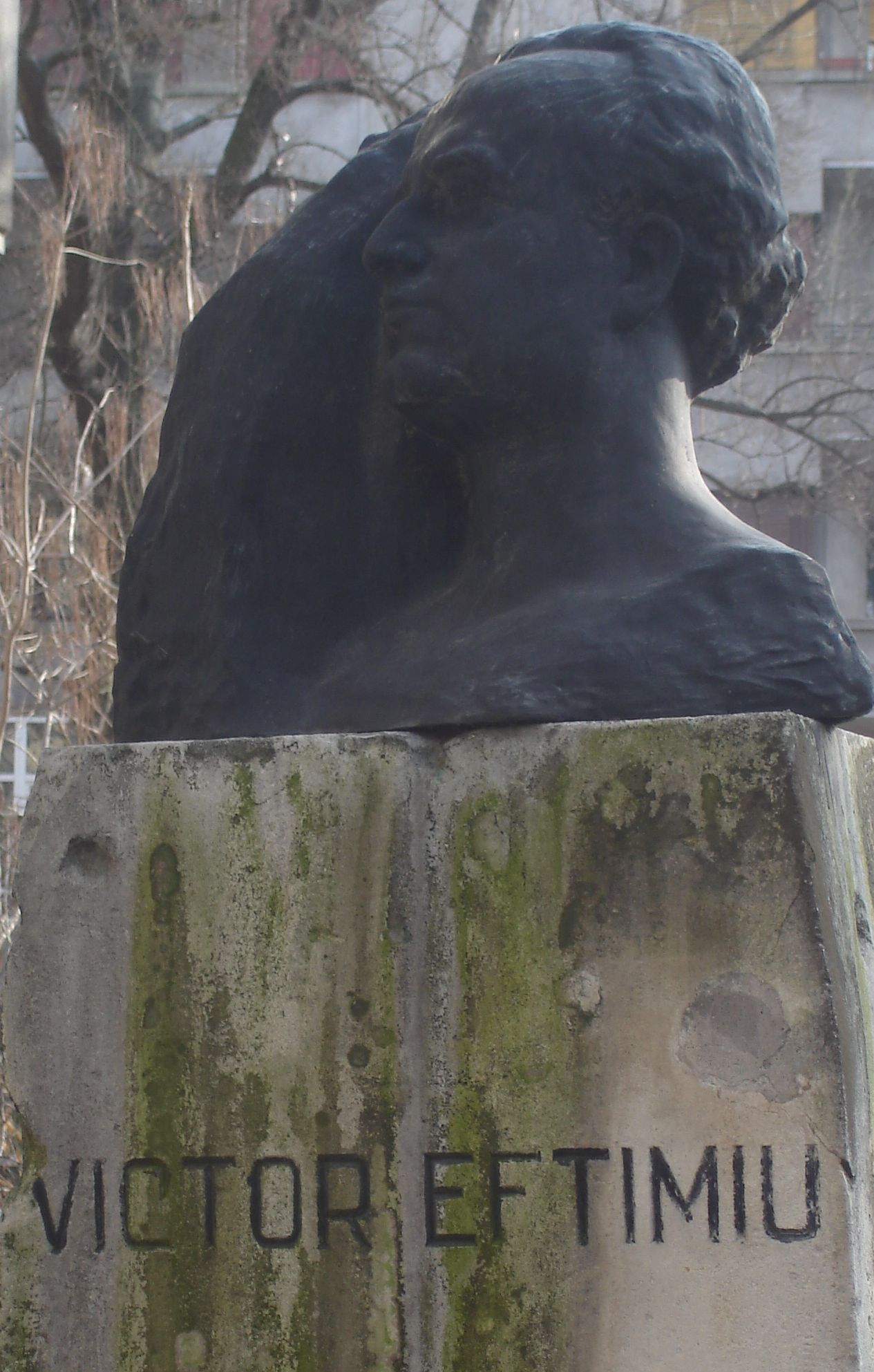
Bust of Eftimiu by Dimitrie Paciurea

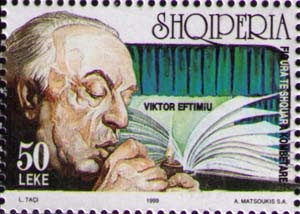
Viktor Eftimiu on a 1999 Albanian stamp

Victor Eftimiu (Romanian pronunciation: [ˈviktor efˈtimju]; 24 January 1889 – 27 November 1972) was a Romanian poet and playwright. He was a contributor to Sburătorul, a Romanian literary magazine. His works have been performed in the State Jewish Theater of Romania.

Eftimiu was of Albanian origin, but also had Aromanian descent through his father Gheorghe Eftimiu, a merchant. Eftimiu's mother was Maria Eftimiu, née Cociu. Victor Eftimiu was born in Boboshticë near Korçë. In 1905, he emigrated from Albania to Romania, where he found work as a theatre manager in 1913. He published several books of poetry, and wrote comedies and satirical pieces for the theatre. He also wrote a volume of Romanian fairy tales, and several children's books. He wrote also criticisms and articles for numerous magazines.

He died in 1972 and was buried at Bellu Cemetery.

Eftimiu lived in a house next to the Cișmigiu Gardens, in central Bucharest. The street where the house is located is named after him; a bust of Eftimiu, sculpted by Dimitrie Paciurea in 1929, is in the house's garden. Streets in Arad, Cluj-Napoca, and Pitești are also named after him.

== Works ==
=== Plays ===
- Înșir-te mărgărite (1911)
- Cocoșul negru (1913)
- Rapsozii (1913)
- Napoleon (1914)
- Akim (1914)
- Ringala (1915)
- Prometeu (1920)
- Inspectorul broaștelor (1922)
- Comoara (1922)
- Dansul milioanelor (1922)
- Don Juan (1922)
- Thebaida (1924)
- Meșterul Manole (1925)
- Glafira (1926)
- Fantoma celei care va veni (1928)
- Omul care a văzut moartea (1928)
- Marele duhovnic (1929)
- Daniela (1931)
- Theochrys (1932)
- Poiana de aur (1933)
- Stele căzătoare (1936)
- Atrizii (1939)
- Haiducii (1947)
- Doctor Faust - vrăjitor (1957)
- Parada (1959)
- Halatul alb (1959)
- Omul de piatră (1966)
- Fetele Didinei (1968)
- Pană Lesnea Rusalim
- Strămoșii
- Crinul vieții

=== Poems ===
- Poemele singurătății (1912)
- Candele stinse (1915)
- Lebedele sacre (1920)
- Cântecul milei (1925)
- Noaptea subterană (1933)
- Oglinzile (1939)
- Cântecul mamei și al copilului (1939)
- 13 decembrie și alte poeme (1947)
- Odă limbii române (1957)
- Soliile terestre (1961)
- Poezii (1964)
- Crizanteme
