= Korçë Lyceum =

High school in the city of Korçë, Albania

Coordinates: 40.6252°N 20.7801°E

The Albanian National Lyceum or French Lyceum (Albanian: Liceu Kombëtar i Korçës or Liceu Francez) was a high school in the city of Korçë, Albania, financed by the Albanian government, but that emphasized the French culture and the European values. The school fully functioned in the years 1917–1939. The building is still used to host the Raqi Qirinxhi High School.

== History ==
The Lyceum opened its doors on 25 October 1917 as the French Lyceum with the decision of the government of the Autonomous Region of Korçë. In 1921 it was renamed to National Lyceum. It was a secular school where all the subjects were in the French language with the exception of the Albanian language.

During World War II, many students of the school joined the youth ranks of the Communist Party of Albania. Following this activity, the fascist regime closed the school. As a result of this decision, which many students found unjust, 150 of them joined the ranks of the Albanian liberation movement after a meeting in Voskopoje. Overall, 384 students of the school joined the liberation movement, out of which 54 died while fighting the fascist and Nazi enemies. Three of them have been declared People's Heroes of Albania by the Albanian government for extraordinary acts of bravery. After 1944, the re-opened school was named after former alumnus and teacher Raqi Qirinxhi, People's Teacher of Albania.

The dictator (from 1944 until his death in 1985) Enver Hoxha was a student here. Under his rule he sent Sabiha Kasimati, a leading scientist who was another fellow student, to be shot in 1951 after she stood against him.

== Notable alumni ==
- Pandi Geço
- Enver Hoxha
- Sabiha Kasimati
- Sotir Kuneshka
- Misto Treska

== See also ==
- Raqi Qirinxhi High School

== Sources ==
- Xoxi, Koli (1997), Liceu Kombëtar i Korçës (1917–1939), Shtëpia Botuese "Lumo Skëndo", OCLC 45500476
