= Enkel Zhuti =

Albanian male ballet dancer

Enkel Zhuti is an Albanian male ballet dancer. He has a career in ballet in Italy where he has been part of a ballet troupe in Milan.
