= Të paftuarit =

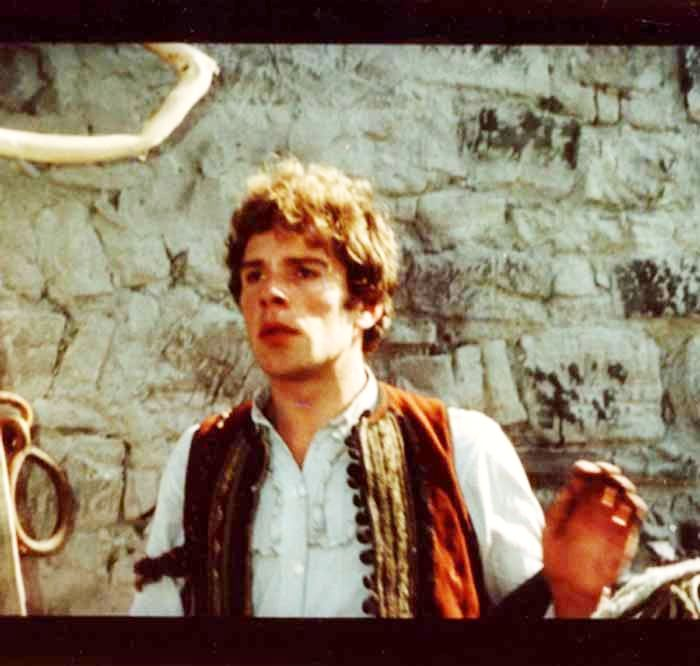
- Piro Qirjo in Të paftuarit
- Directed by: Kujtim Çashku
- Written by: Ismail Kadare
- Based on: Broken April
- Produced by: Klement Rrota
- Starring: Vangjush Furxhi; Rajmonda Bulku; Piro Qirjo; Timo Flloko; Reshat Arbana; Guljelm Radoja
- Cinematography: Ilia Terpini
- Edited by: Shazie Kapoli
- Music by: Feim Ibrahimi
- Production company: Kinostudio Shqipëria e Re
- Distributed by: Kinostudio Shqipëria e Re
- Release dates: 14 June 1985 (Tirana, Albania); 16 December 1988 (East Germany)
- Running time: 91 minutes
- Country: Albania
- Language: Albanian

Të paftuarit (The uninvited) is a 1985 Albanian drama film based on the novel Broken April by the award winning author Ismail Kadare. The film was directed by Kujtim Çashku and its main theme is the blood feud (Gjakmarrja) on a strong political background. The story is set in 1939 Albania and revolves around two main threads. It depicts a couple on a trip in the mountainous north of the country during their honeymoon (starring Vangjush Furxhi and Rajmonda Bulku) and the last days of freedom of a 26-year-old highlander (Piro Qirjo), who has taken revenge for his brother's death, in respect of the traditional law of the region, the Kanun.

== Plot ==
The writer Besian Vorpsi (Vangjush Furxhi) is waiting in the hall of the Royal Palace. Before him, a police officer (Gjon Karma) has been summoned by the King's adjutant (Luan Qerimi) to follow the new austerity measures the King's government has taken after 62 men have been convicted of serious political guilt. The adjutant goes on to explain that most of them were communists, among whom he shows Martin Alushi (Timo Flloko), who has translated Marx's works and is interned in the north of Albania under the supervision of a local prince. Next, the three main religious leaders of Albania get called in. A pack of Camel cigarettes and a photo of the Albanian King Zog is shown on a table, while the adjutant seeks the leaders' support for the King's policies. After them Besian Vorpsi gets received in. The adjutant demands Besian as an influential writer, to go to the north and assure the local prince of the King's support and inviolability of the Kanun. Besian is firstly reluctant to obey since he is getting married in few days, but the adjutant convinces him to spend the honeymoon there and simultaneously do the job.

Couples are shown dancing under a dim light and Siegfried's Funeral March of Wagner’s Götterdämmerung is playing in the background. Besian Vorpsi declares that he and his wife Diana (Rajmonda Bulku) will spend their honeymoon in the northern highlands. Cezar, a Besian's colleague, calls him out on his decision implying that Besian is being politically used in going somewhere that he had himself previously dubbed as the "territories of death". A quiet talk for the upcoming trip follows between the couple in their bedroom. Besian talks about the customs in the north and persuades Diana to come with him and enjoy the beauties of that region. Eventually the couple sets out on the journey to the north of Albania in a horse-drawn carriage. On the way, Besian shows to Diana a highlander with his typical costume and a black armband. He explains with admiration to her that the piece of cloth is a symbol that he either has to "take blood" (revenge) or is a target to be killed.

Gjorg Berisha (Piro Qirjo), is waiting in an ambush near the road with his rifle. After the carriage leaves behind, Gjorg takes aim at an approaching man passing by. At first he hesitates and sighs, then aims again at his target and shoots the man. The couple hears the shooting too. The next moment Gjorg goes to see his victim. Shocked by what he has done he runs away and tells about his killing to the first men he sees so that they can turn his victim right, according to the tradition. Then he runs into Martin Alushi and tells him the same thing. The couple arrives to a guesthouse at night. Next morning Gjorg wakes up, goes to his sheep and plays the flute. He contemplates to his sister about this custom of revenge, calling the killing as horrible and saying that attending the funeral of his victim and the lunch after it is meaningless and unbearable. Meanwhile the couple is having breakfast and Besian notices through his binoculars how in the neighbouring tower, they are washing the blood from the old victim's shirt (Gjorg's brother) since he now was vindicated, while on the other tower they are raising the new bloodshed shirt (Gjorg's victim) as a symbol for an upcoming revenge. Church bells are heard to signal the funeral. The couple sees from the distance how both the victim's and the killer's father attend the funeral in silence, while the killer is also with them. After the funeral, Gjorg and his father have a short talk at home. His father gives him a sack of money, so he can pay the "blood tax" (money paid for 1 month truce) to the prince. The couple stops for a coffee at a guesthouse near a church. In the same place, Gjorg has a short break. Before he resumes his walk, Diana sees him and secretly takes a photo of him. They continue the trip in the carriage, where Besian rebukes her for taking that shot, but quickly forgets about it as they see again Gjorg walking along the way. Near the road, two gendarmes are dragging down a man for being indebted with a local Bajraktar. Martin Alushi tries to intervene but is pushed away by the gendarmes. Besian stops the carriage and gets out. He recognizes Martin and doesn't speak. This infuriates Martin who knows the writer and calls his silence and his trip a shame. In the evening, Gjorg arrives in the prince's tower, followed by the couple. While Besian and Diana are welcomed by the prince (Mario Ashiku) dressed in local costume, Gjorg and the other men who had killed for blood feud are waiting in a room to pay the "blood tax". Mark Ukaçjerra (Reshat Arbana) who is the blood feud’s reeve, summons Gjorg and fills his name on a list. Gjorg gives the money and Mark tells him he has one month truce (6 March – 6 April). The prince, now wearing a tuxedo, receives the couple with a lavish dinner. He talks about the Kanun and Gjakmarrja. The prince and Mark complain about the diminishing blood feuds. Diana asks if they earn money from these blood feuds, and her husband looks at her angrily. The prince replies that the Kanun is a thousand year old, and neither did he invent it or earn from it, but he only guards it. When alone together, the prince makes Mark guilty of the diminishing income since people are giving up on the blood feud. Late at night Besian wakes up, leaves the room and goes to talk to the prince. His wife is worried and goes to look for him. Besian tells the prince that the King esteems his power in the north of the country and supports him, without wanting to interfere in the prince's local authority and the Kanun. On the other hand, the prince appreciates Besian's writings and visit and shows him gratitude.

The next morning in the carriage, Diana confronts Besian on why he didn't come to her at night and that he is hiding something to her. She looks at him doubtfully and they leave in silence with the carriage. While travelling, the couple assists a property dispute and the curious Besian and his wife get closer. A geometer approaches Besian and tells him to write about the difficult life they live in, without having the right to exercise their professions and dubbing all that as a "tragicomedy".

Gjorg is counting his remaining days of freedom. He decides to go up the mountains during his remaining days. His father hands him 2 bullets while his sister ties him the black armband and gives him the flute. On his way, Gjorg runs into Mark Ukaçjerra. Mark tells that he would forgive Gjorg's blood feud and spare his life if he kills a King's enemy, the interned man. Gjorg shakes his head for no and leaves in silence. Along the way he notices a traditional wedding moment and imagines if he was the groom instead. In the carriage, Besian tells to Diana he will go to meet a local leader while she can wander and photograph around. Diana gets into a poor house in miserable conditions where the housewife complains the authorities have jailed her husband. In the carriage Diana talks about her bad impressions inside the tower and recalls a poem of Migjeni. On his way, Gjorg has a friendly encountering with Martin and two highlanders. But they all stand up and leave when Mark approaches. Martin meets his wife who has come from Tirana. She talks about politics, that Italy has sent an ultimatum to Albania and that the fascists may be disembarking unexpectedly. She tells him that the people have no trust in the Kingdom's army anymore. Their meeting is short because a gendarme is waiting for them.

On the way back, Besian and Diana's carriage sees that Cezar is a new convicted. He is tied and guarded by three gendarmes, what doesn't impede him from speaking angrily and feeling revolted at Besian. Meantime Mark Ukaçjerra meets a traditional judge of Kanun, asking him a false judgement, but he denies. Besian stops the carriage and together with Diana goes to meet a doctor he recognizes. He had studied in Austria for microbiology. After coming back to Albania he had made a study to eradicate malaria, but was treated as a madman for his requests and sent to the north. He goes on to explain Besian that now he serves as a type of judge who has to check and decide upon the wounds of a killed man on blood feud, so as each wound on the body is paid differently. A fierce argument starts between them and Diana leaves and hides away. After Besian finds her, Diana accuses him of playing the deaf and blind in this tragedy.

In the next scene, Martin goes to cut timber. While he is cutting down a poplar tree with an axe, Mark hidden on the ground shoots at him. Gjorg Berisha is wandering nearby and upon hearing the shot, runs at Martin, asking who shot. The dying Martin replies that the King and the Tower shot at him, but this order will collapse and then everything will be different. Hearing the shot, several men approach the scene. Gjorg tells that there is no greater shame than to shoot behind the back of an innocent who was not even from there, declaring that the King, the prince and Mark Ukaçjerra shot him, opening up about the later's promise to spare his life if he would shoot at Martin. When the group leaves, a boy reads aloud one of Martin's papers "The King is disarming the people and is selling the country to the foreigners".

The next day Gjorg is wandering on a plain and turns up his head to see a passing airplane. A gunshot is heard and he falls to the ground with arms wide open. Sometime after the shot, Besian and Diana's carriage happen to drive close to him and they stop in silence to see his dead body. More airplanes are heard to fly above them. On the late afternoon they stop at a government office to call the Royal court in Tirana but nobody replies. Then the carriage gets ambushed by a group of armed highlanders, who assumed the king and the queen were inside. Realizing it is not them, they leave. Besian asks a gendarme who reveals that the King has left the country and the kingdom is falling down. After the carriage leaves, he takes off the uniform and ties a reddish scarf around the neck, a symbol of the Partisans’ Resistance. As the carriage continues, a long line of armed highlanders are marching. "Albania is attacked by an enemy. The feuds are closed." ― two of them say. More airplanes patrol the sky throwing flyers down. Besian goes out to see and returns in desperation to Diana. The armed highlanders continue to walk in line and the film ends.

== Cast ==
- Vangjush Furxhi as Besian Vorpsi
- Rajmonda Bulku as Diana, Besian's wife
- Piro Qirjo as Gjorg Berisha
- Reshat Arbana as Mark Ukaçjerra
- Timo Flloko as Martin Alushi
- Violeta Dede as Martin's wife
- Mario Ashiku as the prince
- Luan Qerimi as the King's adjutant
- Fatos Sela as Cezar Dibra
- Guljelm Radoja as the doctor
- Gjon Karma as the police officer
- Lec Bushati as Gjorg's father
- Nefail Piraniqi as Ndreu
- Viktor Bruçeti as the geometer
- Miriam Bruçeti
- Kolë Kaftalli
- Ndrek Shkjezi

== Awards ==
The film Të paftuarit was awarded with the third Prize of the 7th Albanian Film Festival in April 1987. Rajmonda Bulku and Vangjush Furxhi were awarded the Medal of the Festival for their leading roles as Diana and Besian Vorpsi respectively.

== Cinematography ==
Ilia Tërpini was the director of cinematography. Notable is the fact that the movie's cinematography and visual stylization was influenced by the Hungarian director Miklós Jancsó.
