= Piro Qirjo =

Albanian actor and director (born 1963)

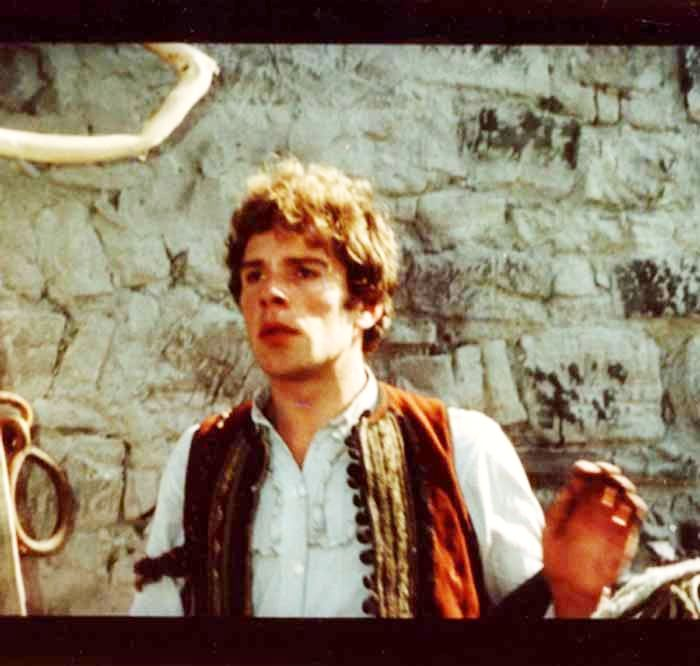
- Qirjo in 1985 in Të paftuarit
- Born: 16 October 1963 (age 62); Korçë, Albania
- Other name: Pirro Qirjo
- Occupations: Actor, director
- Years active: 1984–present

Piro Qirjo (born 16 October 1963) is an Albanian actor and director. Most notably, he played Gjorg Berisha in Të paftuarit of Ismail Kadare's adaptation of Broken April and the German Wehrmacht major Max in Kronikë e një nate. His directing career is known for documentary films and various advertisement films.

== Biography ==
Piro Qirjo was born in Korçë, Albania on 16 October 1963. During the high school years he worked as a puppeteer in the Andon Zako Çajupi Theatre. After the high school he went to Tirana to study acting at the High Institute of Arts and graduated in 1987. Piro played in a number of movies until the early '90s. Since 2000 he has directed documentary films about scientific and social issues and worked as a creative director for various advertisement films.

== Filmography ==
Title	Year	Role	Director(s)	Notes	Ref(s)
Kush vdes në këmbë	1984	Guri, close friend of Petro Nini Luarasi	Vladimir Prifti		
Të paftuarit	1985	Gjorg Berisha	Kujtim Çashku		
Shkëlqim i përkohshëm	1988	Nuri, the theatre director	Albert Xholi		
Rikonstruksioni	1988	Ilir Çelikasi	Vladimir Kasaj		
Kronikë e një nate	1990	Max, the Wehrmacht major	Esat Ibro		

== Theatre credits ==
Year	Title	Role	Director	Venue
1988	Doktori pacient	The doctor's brother	Dhimitër Orgocka	Andon Zako Çajupi Theatre
1988	Kambanat e muzgut	Brigade’s commander	Dhimitër Orgocka	Andon Zako Çajupi Theatre
1989	The Million Pound Bank Note	Henry	Emil Bibolli	Andon Zako Çajupi Theatre
1990	The Threepenny Opera	Mackie	Llazi Sërbo	Andon Zako Çajupi Theatre

== Director ==
Piro Qirjo's directing career spans documentary and advertising films. He has directed scientific and institutional documentaries in cooperation with Albanian and international public institutions. He is also the creative director of various advertisement media and short films.

Year	Title	Notes
2002	Avokati i Popullit (transl. The People’s Advocate)	Institutional documentary film (30 min.) and 5 short advertisement films
2003	E thënë për t’u dëgjuar (transl. Told to be heard)	Scientific documentary film (25 min.) with English subtitles, in cooperation with GTZ and NetVision Studio
2004	Rruga, histori komunikimi (transl. The road, a history of communication)	Institutional documentary film, in cooperation with the Ministry of Transport and Communications
