= Code of Lekë Dukagjini =

Albanian customary law

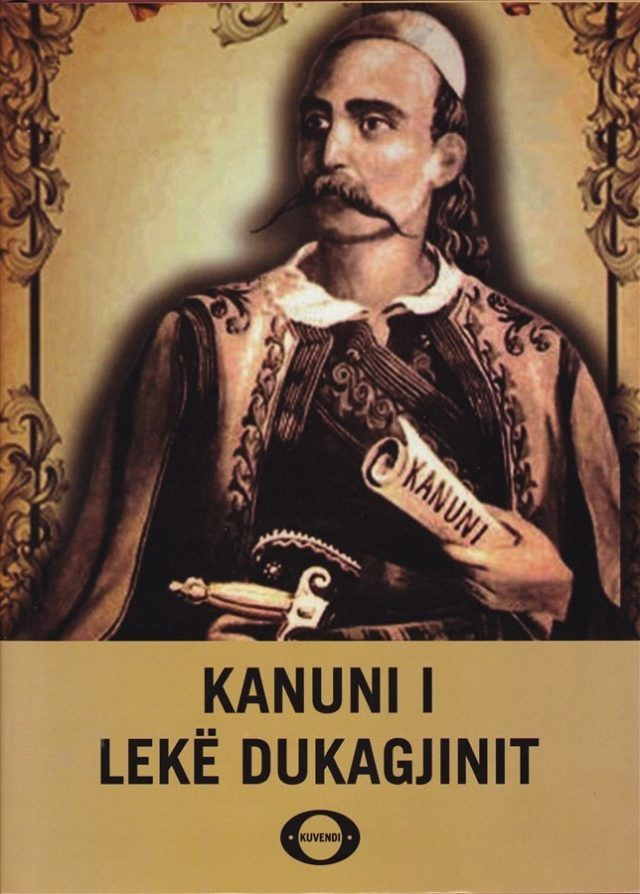
The Code of Lekë Dukagjini

The Code of Lekë Dukagjini (Albanian: Kanuni i Lekë Dukagjinit, also known as the Code of the Mountains (Kanuni i Maleve) is one of the variants of the Albanian customary law transmitted orally. Believed to be much older, it was initially codified by the 15th century Albanian Prince of Dukagjini, Lekë. It was only written and published by the Ottoman administration in the first half of the 19th century in Ottoman Turkish in an attempt to stop the blood feuds. It was then compiled by the Catholic clergy at the turn of the 20th century. The collections of the clergy were published in the Albanian language in the periodical magazines as Albania and Hylli i Dritës. The first complete codification of the usual subject saw its first publication in 1933 in Shkodër, a posthumous work of Shtjefën Gjeçovi (killed in 1929) who collected it mainly in the villages of Mirdita and its surroundings.

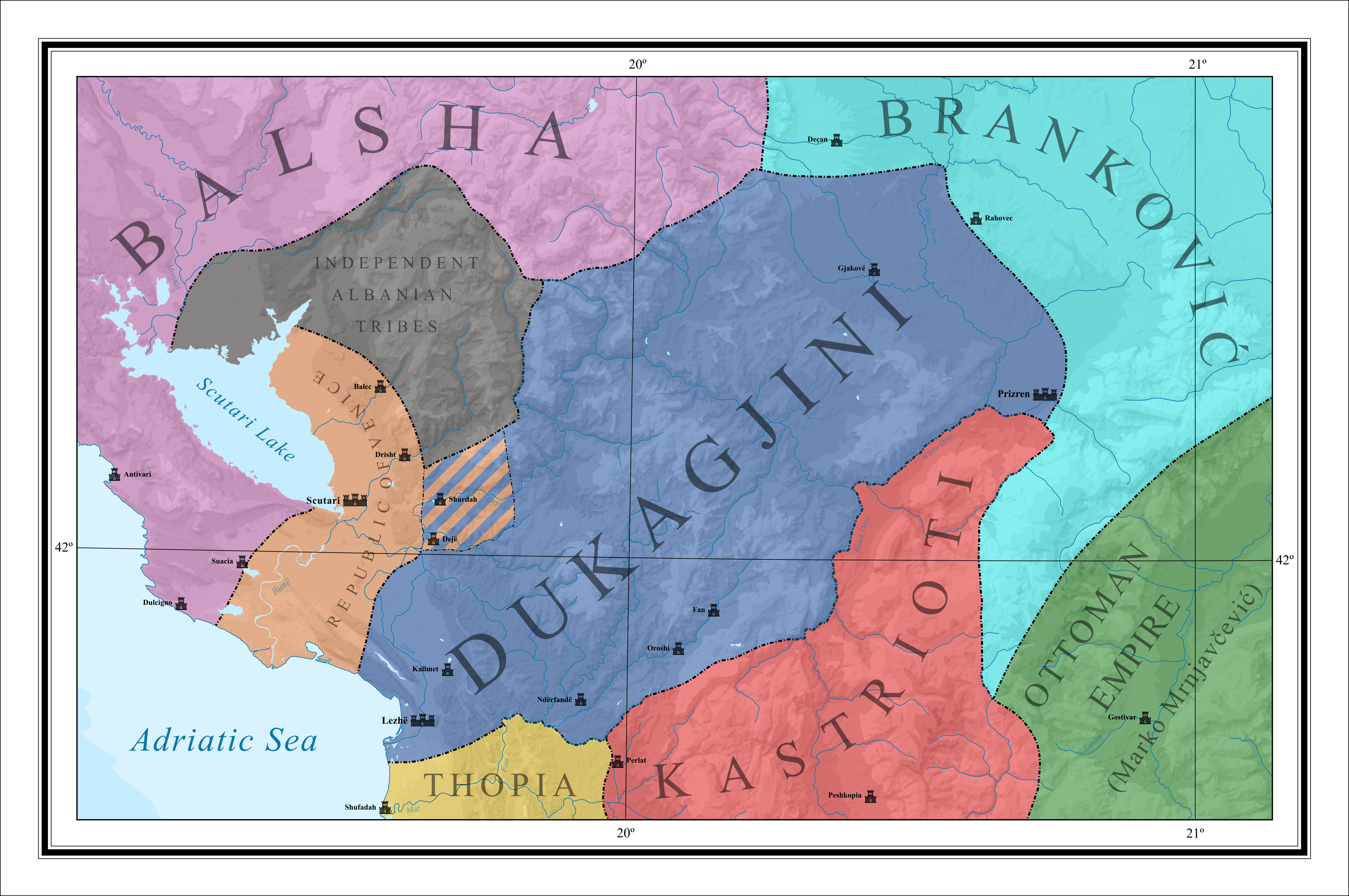

== Overview ==
The Kanun of Lek Dukagjini was named after Lekë Dukagjini (1410–1481), a medieval prince of Dukagjini who ruled in northern Albania and codified the customary laws of the highlands. The code was written down in the 19th century by Shtjefën Gjeçovi and partially published in Hylli i Dritës magazine in 1913. The full version appeared only in 1933 after Gjeçovi's death in 1929.

The text of the Kanun, often contested and with many different interpretations that significantly evolved since the 15th century, was only codified by Dukagjini, not created.

The Kanun is divided into twelve sections, and Gjeçovi's version has 1262 articles regulating all aspects of the mountainous life: economic organisation of the household, hospitality, brotherhood, clan, boundaries, work, marriage, land, and so on. The Besa (personal honor, compare with Latin fides) and nderi (family honor, Latin honor) are of prime importance throughout the code as the cornerstone of personal and social conduct. The Kanun applies to both Christian and Muslim Albanians.

Some of the Kanun's most controversial rules (in particular book 10, section 3) specify how murder is to be handled, which in the past (and sometimes still now) would lead to blood feuds lasting until all men of the two involved families were killed. In situations of murder, tribal law stipulates the principle of koka për kokë (head for a head) where the relatives of the victim are obliged to seek gjakmarrja (blood vengeance). However, this is problematic as although entire families have fallen into blood feuds, the Kanun itself explicitly states that only the initial transgressor is to be targeted in a blood feud, not his family. This is seen in article 898, which states, "Në kanû të veter të Malevet të Shqypnis vetem dorërasi bijte në gjak, ase aj, i cilli tëhiqte, shkrepte e shprazte pushken a çdo armë kundra nierit" (translated as “In the old custom of the Highlands of Albania, only the perpetrator falls into blood [becomes liable for a blood feud], or he who drew, cocked, and fired the rifle or any weapon against a person.") Regarded simply as producers of offspring, women are referred to in a discriminatory manner and not considered worthy targets as such. In some parts of the country, the Kanun resembles the Italian vendetta.

These rules resurfaced in the 1990s in Northern Albania, as people had no faith in the powerless local government and police. Some organizations try to mediate between feuding families and get them to "pardon the blood" (Falja e Gjakut), but often the only resort is for adult men to stay in their homes permanently, as they are considered a refuge, or flee the country. Tribal laws also held that thieves would need to pay fines for the relative amount that was stolen.

Albanian tribes from the Dibër valley known as the "Tigers of Dibra" governed themselves according to the Law of Skanderbeg.

The Albanian Bytyqi, Gashi, Gruda, Trieshi, Hoti, Kastrati, Kelmendi, Krasniqi, Shkreli, and Kuçi tribes are known to follow the Kanuni i Malësisë së Madhë, a variant of the Kanun. Its implementation extends from these tribal regions around Shkodër to the Highlands of Gjakova.

Former communist leader of Albania Enver Hoxha effectively stopped the practice of Kanun with hard repression and a strong state police. After the fall of communism some communities tried to rediscover the old traditions, but some of their parts have been lost, leading to fears of misinterpretation. In 2014, there were still Albanian families involved in blood feuds.

The Kanun contains several customary concepts that have their origins in paganism, including veneration of the dead, animism, and totemism, which date back long before the period of Lekë Dukagjini.

Comparing the Kanun with the Iliad and the Odyssey, the Japanese scholar Kazuhiko Yamamoto has concluded that the basic ethical concepts of the stateless social structure of the Homeric Age — 'faith', 'honor', 'blood', 'revenge', 'food', and 'guest' — are the same customary concepts of the Albanian tribal society.

British anthropologist and writer Edith Durham has suggested that the Kanun likely dates back to the Bronze Age. Other scholars have suggested that it retains elements from Indo-European prehistoric eras. Others further have conjectured that it may derive from ancient Illyrian tribal laws.

== Familja (Family) ==
The second book in the Kanun discusses the concept of family. Article 18 of the Kanun defines the family as a group of human beings who live under the same roof, whose aim is to increase their numbers by means of marriage for their establishment and the evolution of their state, and for the development of their reason and intellect.

The following article, 19, defines the members of the family. The family consists of the people of the house; as these increase, they are divided into brotherhoods (vllazní), brotherhoods into kinship groups (gjiní), kinship groups into clans (fis), clans into banners (flamur), and all together constitute one widespread family called a nation, which has one homeland, common blood, a common language, and common customs.

The family, or household, is led by the zot i shpis (lord of the home), who is typically the eldest male in the house, usually the father or grandfather. In the case that no father is present, or is incapable of leading the family, the eldest son is given authority over the home. In the case that no such figures are available, a caretaker is elected via an assembly (kuvend) based on whoever is the smartest, wisest, and most responsible.

=== Rights ===
The Kanun gives various rights to members of the family, aiming to bring structure and order to the house.

==== Rights of the zot ====
The lord of the home has certain rights over the rest of the house. These include:

1. To sit in the head-place of the house, even when there are older males;
2. Rights over his arms, money, and personal property;
3. Rights over the income and profits of the rest of the house;
4. To take part in real estate transactions and deals;
5. To lend or borrow;
6. To renovate any of their private property (home, pen, etc.);
7. To send members of the family to work, or out of the house;
8. To send members of the family to work towards loans;
9. Rights over the house's alcohol;
10. To punish members of the family.

==== Rights of the zonjë ====
The lady of the home has certain rights as well, though much less compared to the lord. These include:

1. Rights over the items of the home;
2. To lend or borrow flour, bread, salt, cheese, and butter;
3. To give orders to the other females of the house.

==== Rights of the family members ====
Aside from the lord and lady of the home, the Kanun gives various rights to the lesser members of the family as well. These include:

1. To replace the current lord/lady if they find them incapable of leading the home;
2. Rights over their own arms, to sell, trade and do as they please with them;
3. Over what they farm, being able to lend or borrow freely without permission;
4. The shepherd has total control over his flock, and the lord has no right to get mixed in his business.

== Martesa (Marriage) ==
The third book, Martesa (marriage), discusses the concept and customs surrounding marriage. Marriage, by the Kanun, is when a bride is brought to the home, becoming part of the family and leaving her old family and clan behind, to take part in the daily life of the family and have children, extending the family's life another generation.

== Ndera (Honor) ==
The eighth book, Ndera (honor), starts by stating that the Kanun does not differentiate between people. It holds that God has made all men equal, and that all men, good or bad, have the same value and right to life. All men have their own honor, regardless of his standing, and one's honor is a personal thing. Nobody but one's self is in control of his own honor.

The Kanun places heavy weight on the value of honor, and states that a man without honor is considered dead. While the Kanun holds intentional murder as the only true cause for blood feud (gjakmarrje), dishonor, too, is a legitimate cause as the dishonored is considered dead by society. The Kanun states dishonor is not something solved by penalties or fines, but may only be recovered through blood (vengeful killing) or forgiveness.

=== Dishonor ===
After stating that a dishonored man is considered dead, the Kanun lists the many ways in which one may be dishonored:

1. To be called a liar before the other men during an assembly;
2. To be spat on, measured up against, pushed around, or attacked;
3. To break his oath;
4. To have your wife violated or taken;
5. To be disarmed;
6. To have your food violated;
7. To have your home, animal pens, or other private property damaged or destroyed;
8. To have your duties and loans stopped;

Among other things.

== Gjakmarrje (Blood feud) ==
One of the most well known aspects of the Kanun, regardless of the version, is the concept of gjakmarrja (blood feud). The Kanun goes heavily into this concept as it was a significant part of tribal Albanian life. However, the customary laws of blood feuds had not been strictly followed, especially after the decline of the Kanun under Enver Hoxha's regime. In the Kanun, it states the only person to be targeted and fall into feud is the original transgressor, "dorërasi", as seen in article 898. The following article, 899, explicitly states that no one else from the transgressor's family is to be killed, including his immediate male relatives, which have much often been targets of attack in later Albanian feuds.

Another important part of gjakmarrja, and the Kanun's views on the value of a human life in general, is that everyone is born equal. A gjakmarrje is started over the murder of anyone, whether male, female, young, old, rich, or poor. However, the Kanun also states that one person's life is equal only to one life, gjak për gjak (blood for blood). Article 887 states the price for a life is one, as for the good, as for the bad.

The Kanun also makes clear the only case which can start a blood feud is clear murder. Blood feud is not allowed over accidental killings, nor any other crime, whether one was insulted, cursed, robbed, hit, or had his property damaged/burned. This is pointed out clearly in articles 909-915. In article 932, the Kanun states that there is no blood feud over accidental or unintentional killing, which is only punished by fines and compensation.

In the case of a suicide, article 958 states the blood is gone to waste. There is no justice for one who had committed suicide, and if he were currently targeted in a blood feud, his crimes would be paid for by his family via fines and compensation.

In all cases, the Kanun allows for the victim's family to forgive the transgressor, or seek alternative remedies, such as money. A blood feud goes indefinitely until the matter is settled, either through the vengeful murder of the transgressor, or through fines.

=== Pritë ===
In the Kanun, pritë is defined as betraying, or ambushing one with the intent to kill. Such practices are in no way permitted by the Kanun, whether to another Albanian within the state or outside. In the case that someone was ambushed and killed under the Albanian flag, or within the state, all those involved in the ambush are in blood feud with the victim's family. In the case that the crime was committed outside the nation, to kill someone of another banner, only the one who killed the victim falls in a feud, as stated in articles 822-826.

== See also ==
- Lekë Dukagjini
- Shtjefën Gjeçovi
- Kanuns of Albania
