= Blood Law =

Traditional justice among Native Americans

Blood Law, in some traditional Native American communities, was the severe, usually capital punishment of certain serious crimes. The responsibility for delivering this justice has traditionally fallen to the family or clan of the victim, usually a male relative.

== Description ==
Currently in the United States, only state and federal governments or military courts can impose the death penalty. Justice under Blood Law would be considered revenge killing or summary murder, and also could be an additional aggravating circumstance requiring the death penalty for the crime.

Historically, a "cursory survey of the ethnohistorical literature indicates that death was the standard punishment [for witchcraft] among Native American societies," including the Cherokee, Chickasaw, Creek, Delaware, Hopi, Miami, Natchez, Navajo and Seneca.

In 1824 the western Cherokee passed new laws "forbidding the wanton killing of suspected witches". However, traditional views concerning personal or family-enforced retribution for serious crimes appear to have continued in both the Cherokee and Creek communities throughout the 19th Century, and in some communities through into the present day.

== See also ==
- Blood money
- Feud
- Honour killing
- Kanun
- Gjakmarrja
- Krvna osveta
