= Marigo Posio =

Albanian woman activist of the Albanian National Awakening and Independence Movement

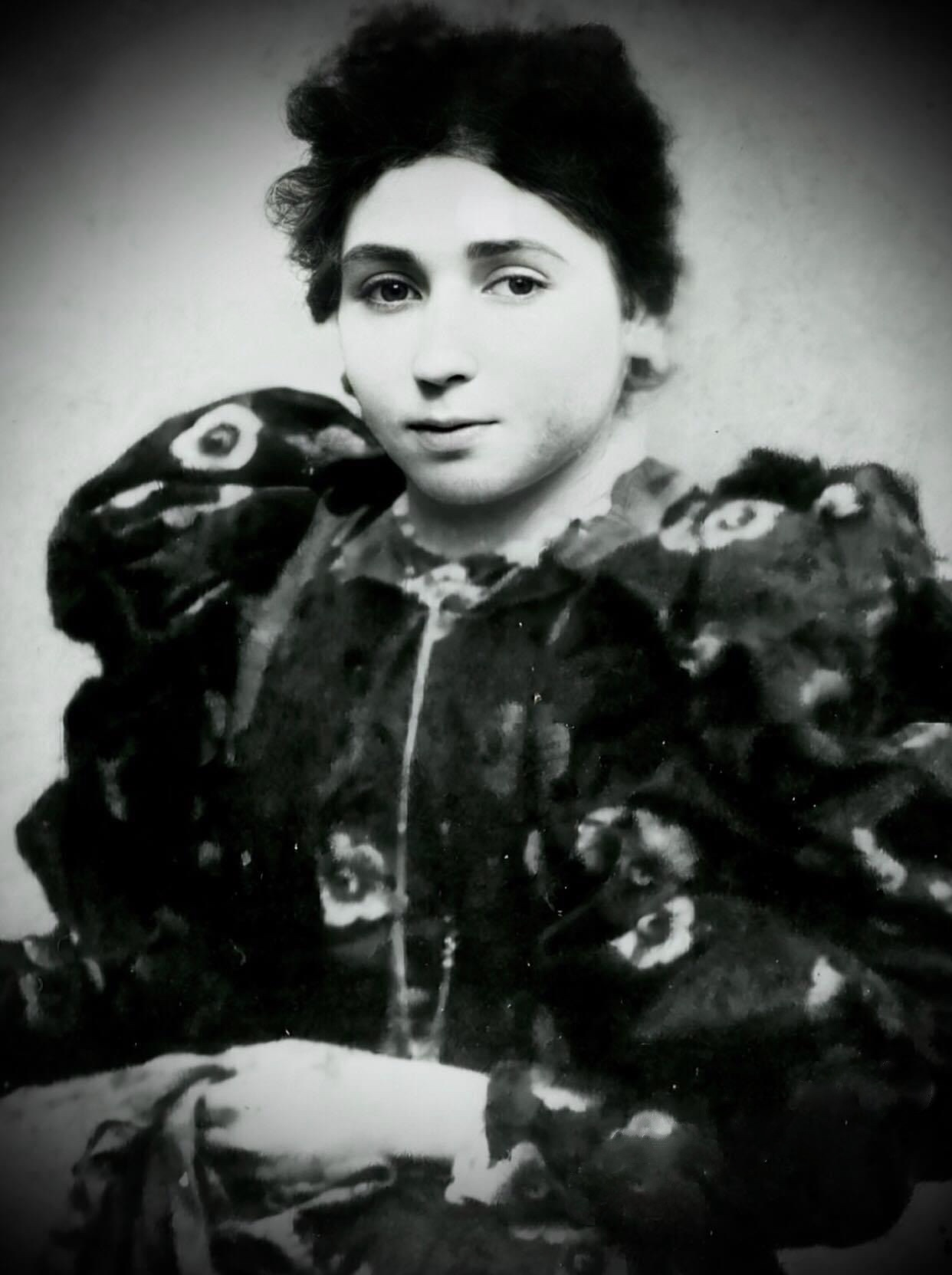
- Born: Marigo Poçi; February 2, 1882; Korçë, Ottoman Empire
- Died: February 23, 1932 (aged 50); Vlorë, Albania
- Resting place: Zvërnec Monastery, near Vlorë
- Spouse: Jovan Posio
- Parent(s): Papa Kosta Poçi (father); Lenka Ballauri (mother)
- Relatives: Urani Poçi (sister); Angjeliqi Poçi (sister); Spiridon Ilo (cousin)

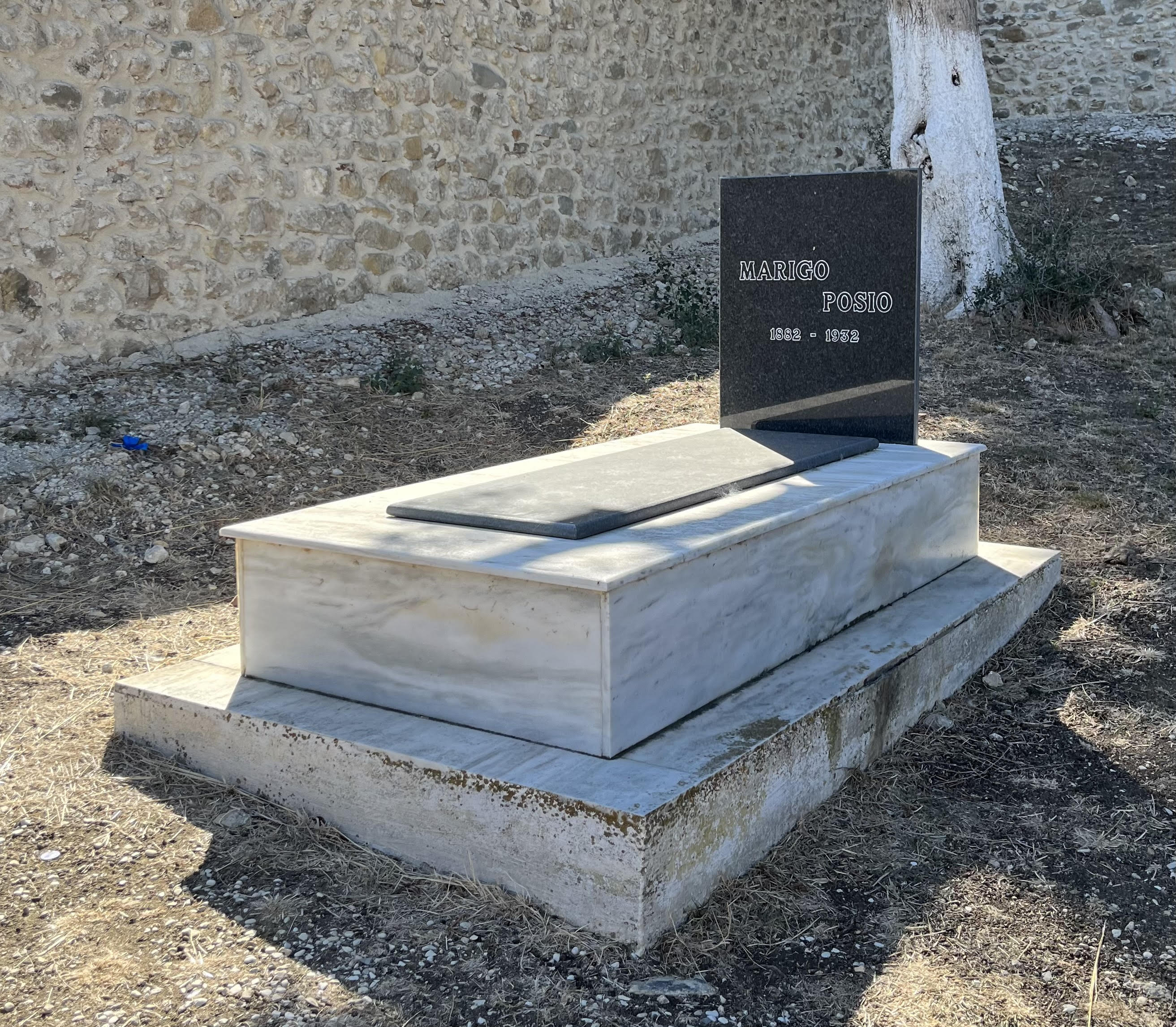
Marigo Posio's grave, located in the courtyard of the St. Mary's Monastery in Zvërnec

Marigo Posio (née Poçi; 1882–1932) was one of the most distinguished Albanian women, an activist of the Albanian National Awakening and Independence Movement, and consolidating the social status of Albanian women. She is mostly remembered for sewing (or embroidering) the flag raised by Ismail Qemali during the Albanian Declaration of Independence in Vlorë on 28 November 1912.

Marigo was the daughter of Papa Kosta Poçi and Lenka Ballauri (from Voskopojë). Some official Albanian sources define Hoçisht village near Korçë (back then Vilayet of Monastir in Ottoman Empire) to be her birthplace. Some other and later sources mention Korçë itself. Her sister Urani was married to Albanian politician and playwright Kristo Floqi, while the other sister Angjeliqi was married to Albanian politician and Prime Minister Kostaq Kota. Her two brothers Niko and Kristo were both emigrants to US, the first one settled in Natick, MA, and the other in Salt Lake City. She was a relative of Albanian patriot Spiro Ilo, activist of the Albanian colony of Romania and signatory of the Declaration of Independence Act. Marigo was educated in the First Albanian School of Korçë, being the 27th student enrolled in it.

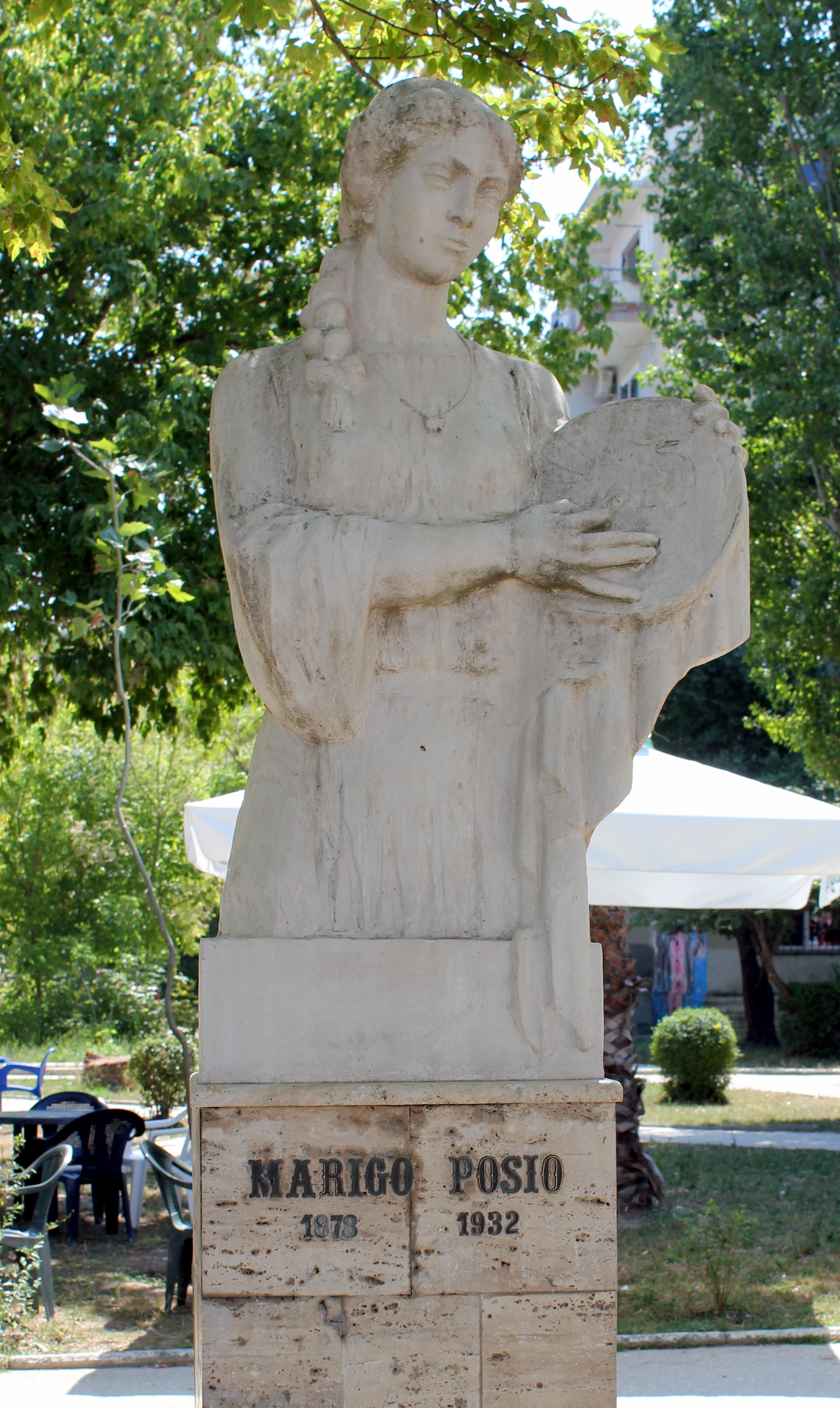
Bust of Marigo Posio

She married Jovan Posio from Hoçisht at a young age. The couple used the last name Posio, although it shows up also as Pozio, Pozjo, or Bozjo. The couple moved to Vlora around 1904, in Muradie neighborhood. Their house served as a center for meetings and activities of Albanian patriotic figures of that time. Marigo was a member of the Labëria Patriotic Club founded in Vlore in 1908. She was one of the initiators of the Albanian School of Vlore of 1909. The Albanian Declaration of Independence took place on 28 November 1912 in Vlora. Marigo is considered the "mother" of the Albanian flag which was raised during the Independence Act. The official sources mention her to have embroidered the flag. Lef Nosi, respected Albanian politician present at the event, states that the black eagle was cut from satin and was sewed upon the red base. Ekrem Vlora mentions that the flag was a gift from Aladro Castriota and Marigo was given it to make copies. In all cases, she is involved. She also produced many copies of the flag on her own expenses for various offices of the Vlora Government.

Marigo is considered a leader of an Albanian Women's Organization, which aimed at helping wounded soldier which came from the border war with Greece. The organization was founded on 13 May 1914. Other members were wives of prominent Albanian figures of the time, i.e. wives of Syrja Vlora or Mehmet Pasha of Delvina.

On 6 February 1921, she started publishing her own paper Shpresa shqiptare ("The Albanian hope") which continued with 6 issues.

The family suffered from a series of misfortunes, first with their children, and later with Marigo's health due to tuberculosis. Kristo Floqi raised his voice on 9 December 1928 accusing the Albanian authorities of having forgotten Marigo's contribution. Marigo did not receive the "veteran's status" like many others did post 1912. She died neglected and forgotten in 1932, and was buried in the Zvërnec Monastery cemetery.
