= Marie Amelie von Godin =

Marie Amelie Julie Anna von Godin
- Born: March 7, 1882; Bavaria, Germany
- Died: February 22, 1956 (aged 73)
- Occupations: Writer; Translator; Women's rights activist; Albanologist
- Organizations: German Catholic Women's League; Protection Association of German Writers
- Known for: German-Albanian dictionary (1930); German translation of the Kanun of Lekë Dukagjini; Advocacy for Albanian independence

Marie Amelie Julie Anna, Baroness von Godin (March 7, 1882 - 22 February 1956), sometimes written as Maria Amalia, was a Bavarian women's rights activist, translator and Albanologist.

== Youth ==
Amalie Marie Godin was brought up in a strict Catholic tradition. She received home schooling and later attended a convent school. She was headstrong and showed little interest in the female virtues, she wanted to study in Zurich, Switzerland, where women were admitted to study at that time. Her parents Julie (née von Eichthal) and Secret Council of Justice Bernhard Karl Gottfried Baron Godin did however not permit that and Marie Amelie lived in retirement at home and began to work as a writer herself. From 1902, she started writing for newspapers Kölnische Volkszeitung and Tägliche Rundschau.

== Friendship with Albania ==
Godin had shown mental problems in 1905, and was sent with her younger brother Reinhard on a long journey which led them to Greece and the Ottoman Empire. On this trip, she met Albanian nobleman Eqrem Vlora and visited him in his native country Albania in 1908. At the time she developed a close friendship with Vlora, and maintained that her whole life. Ekrem Bey Vlora, nephew of Ismail Qemali, came from one rich and influential Muslim family from the region of Vlora had gone to school in Vienna. The love for him and the country - Egon Berger-Waldenegg wrote about her that she was love drunk with Albania - led Godin to follow him and spend half a year in Albania. The two could not marry, however, since they belonged to different religions. Ekrem was a Muslim, she was a Catholic. In his memoirs, Ekrem Bey Vlora hardly writes anything about von Godin but the few mentions are usually preceded by the adjective "dear".

Influenced by several Albanian freedom fighters with whom she came in contact with (during the time of the Albanian National Awakening), Amelie von Godin supported Albanian independence and later informed the public about the poverty and other hardships of the country of Albania. In the spring of 1914, when William of Wied held the office of Prince of Albania in Durrës, she helped in the military hospital of that city as a medic. Since she had an already troubled health in childhood, Godin overstrained herself there so much that she suffered for many years after.

Her impressions of Albania and the country's culture were published by Godin in several books and newspaper articles. Also, several of her novels were set in Albania and were illustrated with her drawings from Albania. In 1930 she published the first part of a German-Albanian dictionary which she was said to have worked on for two decades. In April the same year she visited Franciscan friars in Shkodër. They asked her for a translation of the Kanun of Lekë Dukagjini, a traditional collection of Common Law, into German. Together with Ekrem Bey Vlora and the Franciscans she worked for several months in Shkodër and from 1938 on she began the systematic translation of the extensive body of law, the Kanun, which had first appeared in 1933 in Albanian, written by Shtjefën Gjeçovi. Only after the Second World War the German translation, enriched by comparisons with other versions of the Kanun, could first be published. It was spread over several issues of Journal of Comparative Law. Both works provide a basis of research in Albanalogy.

== Activities in the Women's Association and Protection of German Writers Association ==
Godin, unmarried and often travelling abroad, led an atypical life for that time. Repeatedly she held lectures about Albania and her travels. She hosted however other scientifically active women, e. g. the ethnologist, zoologist, botanist and travel writer Princess Theresa of Bavaria who had stayed in Albania for a while in 1890, and thus she came into contact with many eminent personalities from politics, religion, culture and nobility.

Godin shared a close friendship with women's rights activist Ellen Ammann who founded the first Catholic railway station mission in Germany and the city of Munich's branch of the German Catholic Women's League. From the beginning the Catholic Women's League was supported by Godin, who primarily supported a scientific education of girls and women. After World War I, she distributed food to the impoverished middle class. Later she was a member of the board of the Protection Association of German Writers (German: Schutzverband Deutscher Schriftsteller) that fought against the state intervention into literary creation.

== Activity under Nazi rule ==
Just after the death of Ellen Amman in November 1932 Godin published her biography. The Nazis immediately put it on the index of censored books, as Ammann had helped defeat Hitler's coup in 1923. In addition to Godin's friendship with Ellen Ammann, the Nazis also monitored her because she was the great-granddaughter of a Jew, Aron Elias Seligmann, and her cousin Michael von Godin, a chief publisher had also played a major role in the obstruction of Hitler's coup. When Michael von Godin was released from protective custody in the Dachau concentration camp he fled to Switzerland. Marie Amelie Godin did not deny her Jewish ancestry and as a committed Catholic she helped Jewish friends. During her probably last trip to Albania in 1939, she accompanied a Jewish woman to safety into that country. According to the Nuremberg Laws, as a Jewish "half-breed, Grade II", she required a special permit to become a member of the Reich Chamber of Authors and to continue to be active as a writer. During those years she published only harmless novels of the home country pastoral novels which were well received by the public. However, Marie Amelie was banned from publishing on Albanian themes: the suspicion was that she supported Albanian resistance fighters and thus she was strictly monitored.

== Postwar Germany ==
After the Second World War Godin helped in the reorganization of the Catholic Women's League and in the care of refugees, which was difficult for her due to poor health. She worked as a translator of literature and interpreter. From afar she critically followed the developments in socialist Albania - in particular the persecution of the Catholic clergy.

Godin died aged 76 after a long illness.

== Works ==
- Vergessen...? Roman aus der jüngsten Geschichte Albaniens (1963)
- Die drei Kolaj - Gefährliche Wege im aufständischen Albanien (1961)
- Der Unterlehner und sein Sohn (1957)
- Der Überfall (1955)
- Der Schuss im Kampenwald (1955)
- Die große Angst – Roman mit Zeichnungen Von Johannes Wohlfahrt (1955)
- Schauspieler (1941)
- Vom Dorfe geächtet (1940)
- Gjoka und die Rebellen. Geschichtlicher Roman aus dem Albanien unserer Tage (1939)
- Der Brennerwirt von Berchtesgaden (1937)
- Auf Apostelpfaden durch das schöne Albanien (1936)
- Die Örtlbäuerin (1936)
- Der tolle Nureddin (1936)
- Ellen Ammann (1933)
- Das Opfer (1930)
- Wörterbuch der albanischen und deutschen Sprache. Teil I. (1930)
- Wörterbuch der albanischen und deutschen Sprache. Teil II. (1930)
- Der Heilige Paulus (1927)
- Die "Bessa" des Jakub Schara (1921)
- Befreiung. Roman aus dem modernen Albanien (1920)
- Unser Bruder Kain (1919)
- Feinde (1917)
- Aus dem neuen Albanien: politische und kulturhistorische Skizzen (1914)
- Aus dem Lande der Knechtschaft (1913)
- Alte Paläste (1910)
- Benedetta. Roman einer heißen Liebe (1909)

=== Translations ===
- Emile Baumann: Der heilige Paulus (1926)
- Louis Bertrand: Die heilige Theresia (1928)
- Gjeçovi, Shtjefën. "Das albanische Gewohnheitsrecht". Zeitschrift für vergleichende Rechtswissenschaft (in German). 56–58.
