= Reconciliation Movement in 1990 =

Reconciliation Movement in 1990 Lëvizja për pajtimin e gjaqeve
- Date: 1990
- Location: Verrat e Lukes, Lumbardh, Deçan, Kosovo
- Also known as: Verrat e Lukes, Pajtimi gjaqeve,
- Cause: Blood Feud
- Organised by: Students
- Participants: 500,000

Reconciliation Movement in 1990 a.k.a. (Verrat e Lukes, allegiance, To you I forgave thee blood, Kosovo), was an Albanian all-national movement for blood pardon in Albania and Kosovo. It was organized in 1990 by students, professors and workers' unions in Kosovo. It is part of similar movements throughout Albanian regions since the 1960s.

== History ==
Gjakmarrja (literally "blood-taking" meaning "blood feud") or Hakmarrja ("revenge") refers to the social obligation to commit murder in order to salvage honour questioned by an earlier murder or moral humiliation. This practice is generally seen as in line with the social code in Albania known as Kanuni i Lekë Dukagjinit, or simply the Kanun (English: The Code of Lekë Dukagjini).

In 1980, many Albanians were locked in their homes because of the feud, though the murders continued. In Kosovo, many organizations were established for reconciliation campaigning that they "should stop the killings, because Serbia is killing us". Such killings are said to continue till today, especially in Albania and North Macedonia.

In the course of the reconciliation campaign that ended blood feuds among Kosovo Albanians, the largest restorative justice conference took place at Verrat e Llukës on 1 May 1990, which was attended by between 100,000 and 500,000 participants. The reconciliation campaign was led by Anton Çetta. Over a period of three years (1990-1992), approximately one third of the entire population of Kosovo was documented to be actively involved in restorative justice conferences to end the blood feuds. By 1992, the reconciliation campaign ended at least 1,200 deadly blood feuds, and in 1993, not a single homicide occurred in Kosovo.
