= Spiridon Ilo =

Albanian founding father (1876–1950)

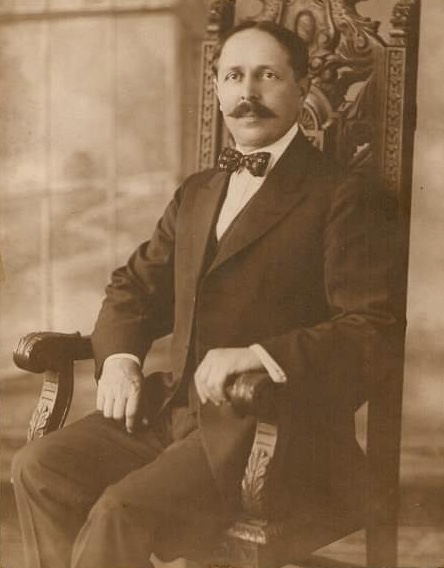
- Born: 30 September 1876; Korçë, Manastir Vilayet, Ottoman Empire
- Died: November 7, 1950 (aged 74); Korçë, Albania
- Other names: Spiridhon Ilo, Spiro Ilo
- Known for: Albanian Declaration of Independence; Albanian National Anthem first recording Albanian Colony of Romania

Spiridon Ilo (30 September 1876 – 7 November 1950) was one of the founding fathers of Albania as a signatory of the Albanian Declaration of Independence.

Ilo was born in Korçë, in the Manastir Vilayet of the Ottoman Empire (present-day Albania) in 1876.
He worked as a teacher in the girls' school of his home town founded by the Qiriazi family. He later emigrated to Bucharest where he was part and active member of the Albanian colony. In December 1909, he participate in the theatrical play "Besa" (English: Faith) together with Dhimitër Beratti. Ilo is said to have brought the Albanian flag to Albania in the Declaration of Independence in 1912, one of the versions of the non well-clarified origin of the Albanian flag of the 28 November 1912. The mostly accepted version so far is that the flag was embroidered by his relative Marigo Posio.
In 1913, he returned to Romania and in 1916 emigrated to New York where he continued his patriotic work.

In 1923 he founded the first Albanian recording company, Albanian Phonograf Records, and recorded the Albanian national anthem written by Asdreni and music from Porumbescu. In 1946, he donated to his native city the technology and equipment of the recording studio, which was destroyed later for reusing some parts for building the antenna of Radio Korça. In 1926, he returned to Korçë where he lived the rest of his life. During these years, he published and sold patriotic postcards. He also published the comedy "Vërtet ëndërr" (Really a dream) and also a song collection "Dëshirat e zemrës" (Desires of the heart). He died in Korçë in 1950.
