= Lec Bushati =

Albanian actor

Lec Bushati AM
- Born: 10 July 1923; Shkodër, Albania
- Died: 16 September 1996 (aged 73)
- Occupation: Actor

Lec Bushati (Albanian pronunciation: [ˈlɛts buˈʃati]; 10 July 1923 – 16 September 1996) was an Albanian actor from Shkodër who played more than 150 roles in both theatre and film.

== Life and career ==
He was born in Shkodër on 10 July 1923. He started education in the then Xavier (now Pjetër Meshkalla High School) college of the city and finished in 1945. There he interpreted parts in plays like Princi i Drishtit ("The Prince of Drisht") written by Zef Harapi and Udha ("The Road"). After graduation he would play parts in works from writers such as Maxim Gorky, Henrik Ibsen and Gjergj Fishta (Juda Makabe, 1914). He later enrolled in "Aleksandër Xhuvani Institute" and then University of Arts, Tirana, finishing his studies in 1964.

Bushati was one of the first actors to perform in the newly constructed "Migjeni" Theatre in Shkodër, mostly acting in plays written by playwright Andrea Skanjeti. He then expanded into other roles as a professional actor, playing a variety of characters in epics, dramas and tragedies.

He also played in 15 films, most notably Detyrë e posaçme (1963), Ditët që sollën pranverën (1979), Të paftuarit ("The Uninvited") (1985), Shembja e idhujve (1977).
