= Himni i Flamurit =

National anthem of Albania

English: 'Hymn to the Flag'
- Sheet music
- National anthem of Albania
- Lyrics: Asdreni, 1912
- Music: Ciprian Porumbescu, c. 1883
- Adopted: 28 November 1912; 113 years ago

Audio sample
- Instrumental rendition in A-flat major by the U.S. Navy Band (single verse): file; help

"Himni i Flamurit" ('Hymn to the Flag') is the national anthem of Albania, adopted in 1912. Its music is the Romanian patriotic song "Pe-al nostru steag e scris Unire", composed by Ciprian Porumbescu. The lyrics were written by Albanian poet Asdreni. The anthem was originally titled "Betimi mbi Flamur" ("The Pledge on the Flag").

== History ==
First voice recording of the anthem (1918)
Performed in September 1918 by Arbëresh tenor Giuseppe Mauro, assisted by music producer and patriot of the national movement Spiridon Ilo

On 21 April 1912, "Betimi mbi Flamur" was first published as a poem in Liri e Shqipërisë (Freedom of Albania), an Albanian newspaper in Sofia, Bulgaria. It was later printed in a volume of poems by Drenova titled Ëndra e lotë (Dreams and Tears) which was published in Bucharest. According to Lasgush Poradeci's memoirs, the anthem, created by the adaptation of the text to the music, was not originally intended to be a national anthem, but it was so well liked by the people that it was proclaimed as the national anthem in 1912, and it was with its music that the Albanian flag was raised during the Albanian Declaration of Independence in the city of Vlorë.

=== Music ===
The Hungarian composer György Ligeti opined that the music composed by Porumbescu is rooted in Germanic and Austrian musical traditions, though this is not a definitive groundbreaking explanation of its influence and later creation. It is a view based on Porumbescu's musical education, since he had studied at the University of Music and Performing Arts, Vienna. The view has been shared by Albanian musicologist, Ramadan Sokoli.

== Lyrics and melody ==
The second half of each verse is considered refrain and is repeated. Usually only the first stanza of the anthem is performed, such as during sporting events.

Albanian original
English translation

Rreth flamurit të përbashkuar
Me një dëshir' e një qëllim,
Të gjith' atij duke u betuar (Note: Atij ('it') is sometimes replaced with atje ([a.tjɛ]; 'there'), and duke u is sometimes written duk' iu, duk' ju or similar.)
Të lidhim besën për shpëtim.
𝄆 Prej lufte veç ai largohet
Që është lindur tradhëtor,
Kush është burrë nuk frikohet,
Po vdes, po vdes si një dëshmor! 𝄇 (Note: Po ('but') is sometimes written por, an ancestral form.)

Në dorë armët do t'i mbajmë,
Të mbrojmë atdheun në çdo kënd,
Të drejtat tona ne s'i ndajmë;
Këtu armiqtë s'kanë vend! (Note: Alongside the standard form vend ('place') one can also find the variant vënd, found in most Tosk dialects, with which the lyrics were originally written, as evidenced by the now lost rhyme with kënd.)
𝄆 Se Zoti vetë e tha me gojë
Që kombe shuhen përmbi dhe,
Po Shqipëria do të rrojë;
Për të, për të luftojmë ne! 𝄇

O Flamur, flamur, shenj' e shenjtë
Tek ti betohemi këtu
Për Shqipërin' atdheun e shtrenjtë, (Note: Për ('for') is sometimes written pë, and atdheun ('homeland') is sometimes written atdhenë.)
Për nder' edhe lavdimn e tu.
𝄆 Trim burrë quhet dhe nderohet
Atdheut kush iu bë therror.
Përjetë ai do të kujtohet
Mbi dhe, nën dhe si një shenjtor! 𝄇 (Note: Apostrophes represent the elision of word-final ë's, and representation of this among different sources varies.)

Around our flag united we stand,
With one wish and one intention.
A sacred oath we bestow upon it,
Faith for our pardon we blazon.
𝄆 From battle only he abstains,
For who is born a traitor.
He who a true man frightened not,
But to the cause dies a warrior. 𝄇 (Note: Only when the first verse alone is performed.)

We are armed with weapon in hand,
In defending our fatherland.
Our sacred rights we shall cede not,
On our land the foe has a place not.
𝄆 For God himself proclaimed:
Some nations of the earth will end,
And yet Albania will live and succeed.
For her, for her we shall defend. 𝄇

O Banner, banner, you symbol sacred
Upon you we now swear.
For Albania, our dear fatherland,
For your glory and honour.
𝄆 Now the hero's named and honoured,
The one who died for the motherland.
Forever shall he be remembered
On earth and under as a saint! 𝄇
