= Eqrem Vlora =

Albanian politician (1885–1964)

Eqrem Vlora Bey
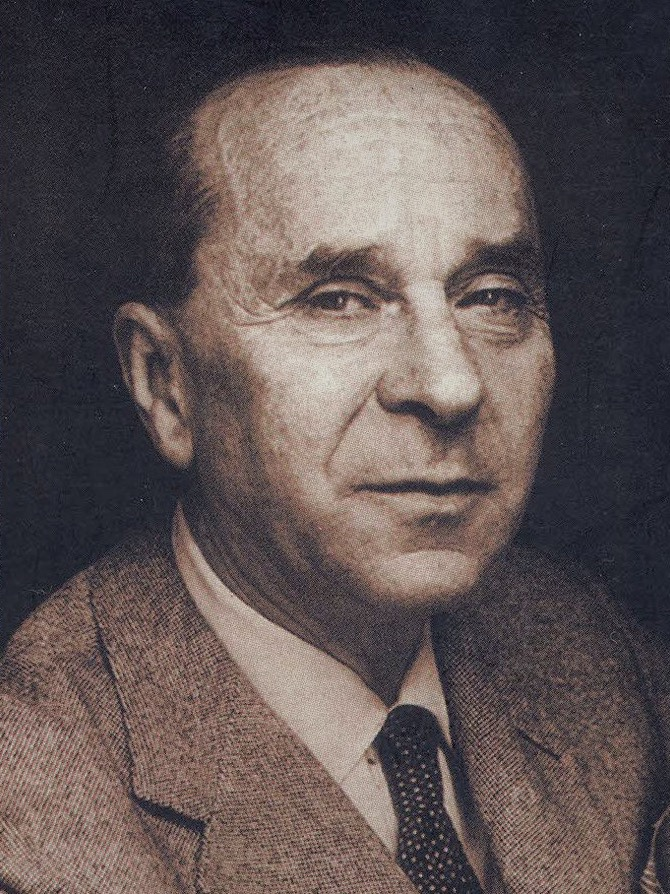
- 1941 portrait
- Born: 1 December 1885; Vlorë, Ottoman Empire (modern day Albania)
- Died: 30 March 1964 (aged 78); Vienna, Austria
- Other name: Ekrem Vlora
- Occupations: Scholar, writer, politician
- Parent(s): Syrja and Mihri Vlora
- Family: Vlora and Toptani family

Eqrem Bey Vlora (1 December 1885 – 30 March 1964) was an Albanian lord, politician, writer, and one of the delegates to the Assembly of Vlorë, which proclaimed the Albanian Declaration of Independence on November 28, 1912. He was described as The Last of Beys (Beu i Fundit), the embodiment of the Albanian aristocracy of the time, although he came from a caste founded on the principles of Ottoman military fief.

Eqrem Bey Vlora used his own flag that he lent to Ismail Qemali. The origin of the flag came from Aladro Kastrioti who said he was a descendant of Gjerg Kastrioti Skenderbeg. The flag was given to him as a gift to represent the Double Headed Eagle that was raised in Kruje, Albania. Eyewitnesses say that Ismail Qemali told Eqrem to go back home to Fetch the Double headed Eagle flag when the time came to raise the flag. After the flag was lent he asked for it back and told the Qemali household to make a new one, which Marigo Posio made with cheap cloth and stitched by hand.

== Early life ==
Eqrem Vlora was born on 1 December 1885, in Vlorë, Ottoman Empire (today Albania), to Syrja Bey Vlora, a diplomat and politician, as well as a member of one of the wealthiest landowning families of the South Albania, and Mihri Vlora (née Toptani), member of one of the prominent families of Central Albania, the Toptani family. His uncle, Mehmed Ferid Pasha, served as Grand Vizier of the Ottoman Empire. He was related both to Ismail Qemali and also to his main political opponent Esad Pasha, who were both his first cousins from his father's and mother's side respectively.

Eqrem received his first lessons from private teachers, since his family was relatively wealthy in both the region and throughout Janina Vilayet. According to his memoirs written later while living in Austria, he writes that his first teachers were Luigi Beccali, an Italian from Messina, and Mehmet Effendi Lusi who served as imam in Kaninë, a nearby town. The latter taught him theology, a subject that was essential for the children of families with such status in the Ottoman provinces. He was educated at the Theresianum in Vienna, 1899–1903, and studied law and religion in Istanbul, 1904.

After working for the Ottoman Foreign Ministry for a time, including a three-month tour of duty at the Ottoman embassy in St. Petersburg in 1907, and years of travel in Europe, Albania and the Orient, he joined his uncle Ismail Qemali in the movement for Albanian independence. During these travels he met some of the most important personalities of the time, including Herbert Kitchener, Franz Conrad von Hotzendorf, several Arab sheikhs who would become the monarchs of the Arab countries and also a young lieutenant, Mustafa Kemal, who would eventually become the president of Turkey. According to Vlora's memoirs, members of his family were de facto (not de jure) sanjakbeys of Sanjak of Avlona in period 1481–1828.

== Balkan Wars ==
In mid-October, Vlora arrived in Vienna after being sent on a mission by Albanian notables of middle and south central Albania to seek support from Austro-Hungarian officials regarding Albania's future and its borders especially along the Kalamas river and the inclusion of Chameria up to Preveza. During the Balkan Wars, he was given the rank of reserve major and the command of a territorial battalion (composed of Albanians) for the defense of Vlora by the Ottoman Empire commander in Ioannina. After several skirmishes with the Greek forces in the area of Himarë, he was recalled to Vlora by his uncle, Ismail bey.

== Albanian state ==
In 1912, he was made deputy president of the senate. He was sent in Neuwied to meet the Prince Wilhelm of Wied, chosen to rule Albania. Later, he served in the Foreign Ministry during the Prince's reign and was distinguished as the commander of a volunteer artillery battery during the attack of peasant rebels on Durrës. He also received the Order of the Eagle for gallantry shown during the siege. He was a known supporter of the Central Powers during World War I for which reason he kept under arrest in Italy during most of the war but subsequently became a promoter of close relations between Italy and Albania. He was friendly towards the Italian commanders during the Italian invasion of Vlora in 1920. Vlora was elected to parliament in 1924, representing a conservative wing and, in 1925, became a senator for a short period of time. His relations with Ahmet Zogu were tenuous, though he served the latter on various diplomatic missions abroad. He was a close friend of the Bavarian baroness Marie Amelie, Freiin von Godin, with whom he translated the Kanun of Lekë Dukagjini into German.

== Collaboration ==
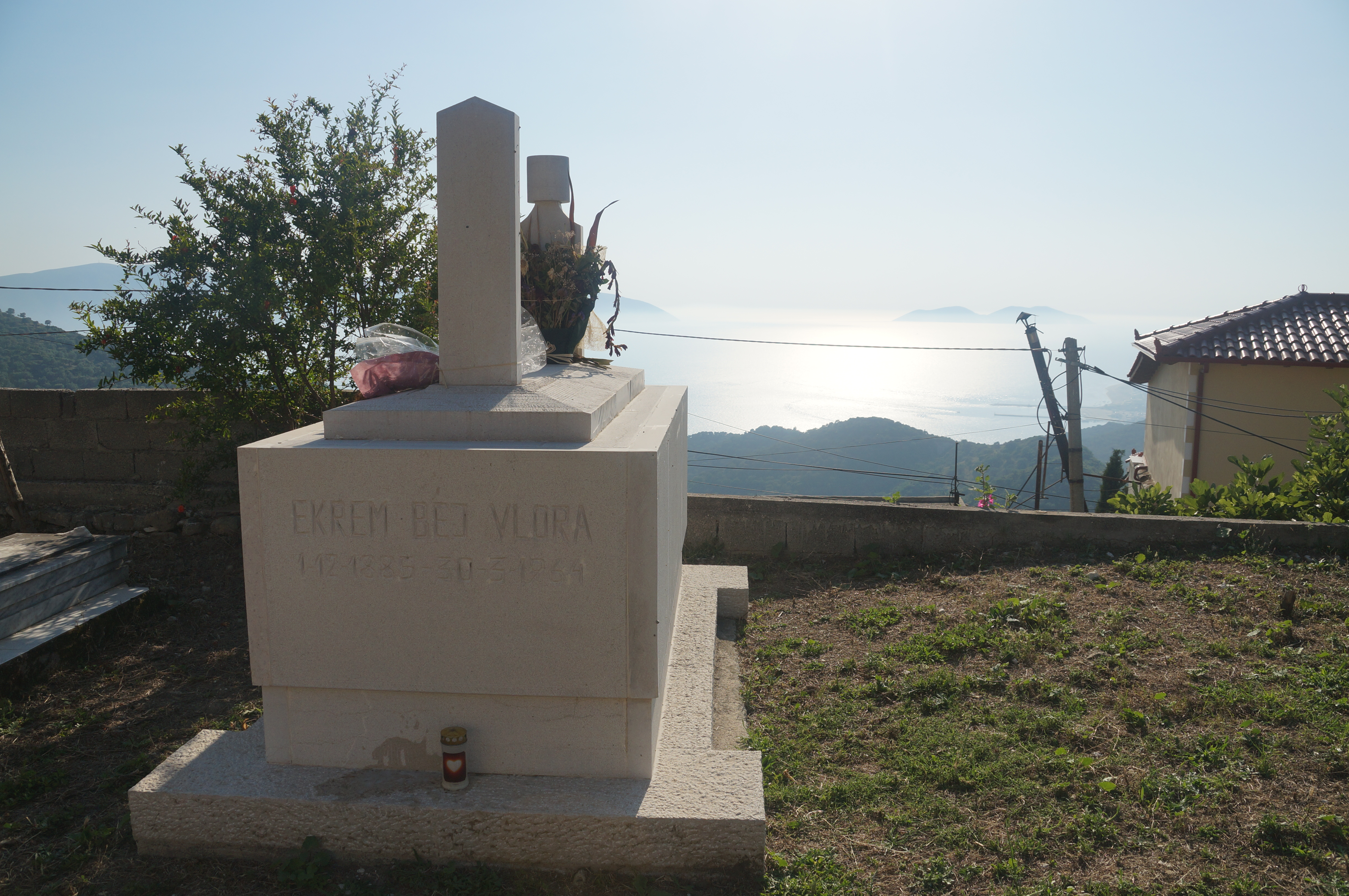
Vlora's grave in Kaninë, Vlora

Vlora welcomed the Italian invasion of April 1939 and had close links to the Italian fascists. In 1942, Mustafa Merlika-Kruja appointed him Minister for Kosovo, the western half of which had been incorporated into Albania. His anti-Slavic policies, however, gave rise to widespread resistance among the Serbs and Montenegrins. In the summer of 1944, he was made Foreign Minister and Minister of Justice before going into Italian exile during the communist takeover. He died in Vienna in 1964 and was buried at the Neustift am Walde Cemetery until 30 March 2014. Since 30 March 2014, his remains were reinterred in Vlorë.

== Writer ==
As a writer, Eqrem bej Vlora is remembered for his monograph Aus Berat und vom Tomor: Tagebuchblätter ('From Berat and Tomorr: Pages of a Diary', Albanian: Nga Berati në Tomorr dhe kthim : ditar), Sarajevo 1911, and, in particular, for his two-volume German-language memoirs, published posthumously as Lebenserinnerungen ('Memoirs'), Munich 1968, 1973, which provide insight into the world of an early 20th-century Albanian nobleman. They have recently been translated into Albanian as Kujtime ('Memoirs'), Tirana 2002, and Turkish as Osmanli Arnavutluk'undan anilar, 1885-1912 ('Notes from Ottoman Albania, 1885-1912'), Istanbul 2006. Unpublished remains his monumental 1200-page typescript Beiträge zur Geschichte der Türkenherrschaft in Albanien: eine historische Skizze ('Contributions to the History of Ottoman Rule in Albania: an Historical Sketch'), from which this account of the noble families of Medieval Albania is taken.

== Sources ==
- This article includes the text from Robert Elsie's personal site with explicit permission of the site author to use it under GNU FDL.
- "History of Albanian People" Albanian Academy of Science. ISBN 99927-1-623-1
- Vlora, Ekrem (1968). Lebenserinnerungen (in German). Munich: R. Oldenbourg. OCLC 3623007.
