= Andon Zako Çajupi Theatre =

City theatre in Albania

Coordinates: 40.6187°N 20.7771°E

- Teatri "Andon Zako Çajupi"
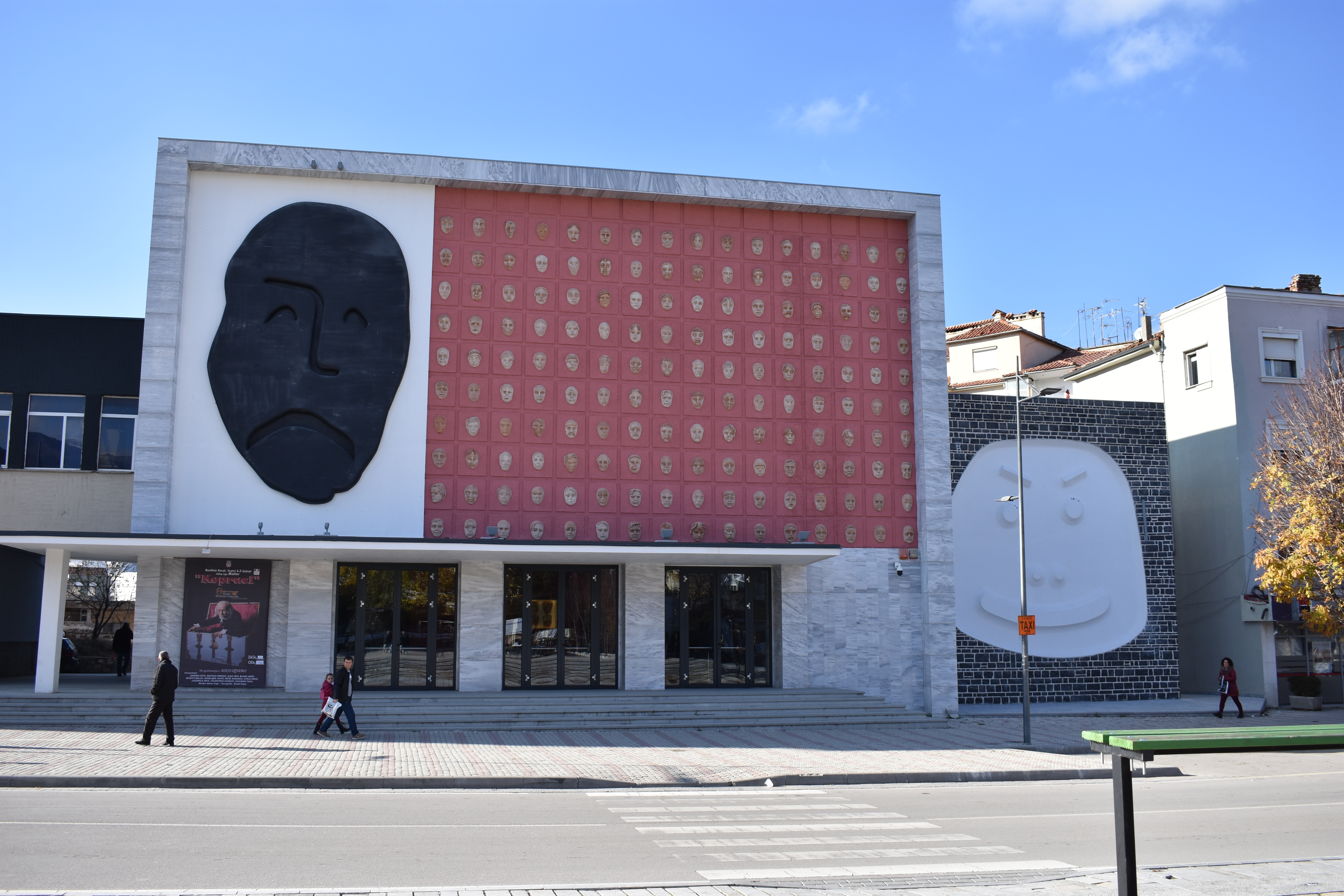
- Facade of theatre
- Interactive map of Andon Zako Çajupi Theatre
- Address: Korçë; Albania
- Owner: State owned

Construction
- Opened: 1950
- Rebuilt: 2017

The Andon Zako Çajupi Theatre, named for Andon Zako Çajupi, is the city theatre of the city of Korçë in southern Albania.

The theatre opened in 1950 and has been working since, without interruption. In 2016 the theatre was reconstructed to turn it into a modern theatre. Firstly, when it was opened the theatre was made by 10 professional actors and 15 amateur actors. Today there are famous actors and directors such as: Zamira Kita, Sotiraq Bratko, Blerta Belliu, Ilda Pepi, Klodjana Keco, Paola Kodra etc. Since 2013 in this theatre is held KOKO Fest or Korça Comedy. The most famous shows shown are: Othello, Besa, 8 Femmes and The House of Bernarda Alba.

== See also ==
- List of theatres in Albania
