= Kanun (Albania) =

Albanian traditional laws

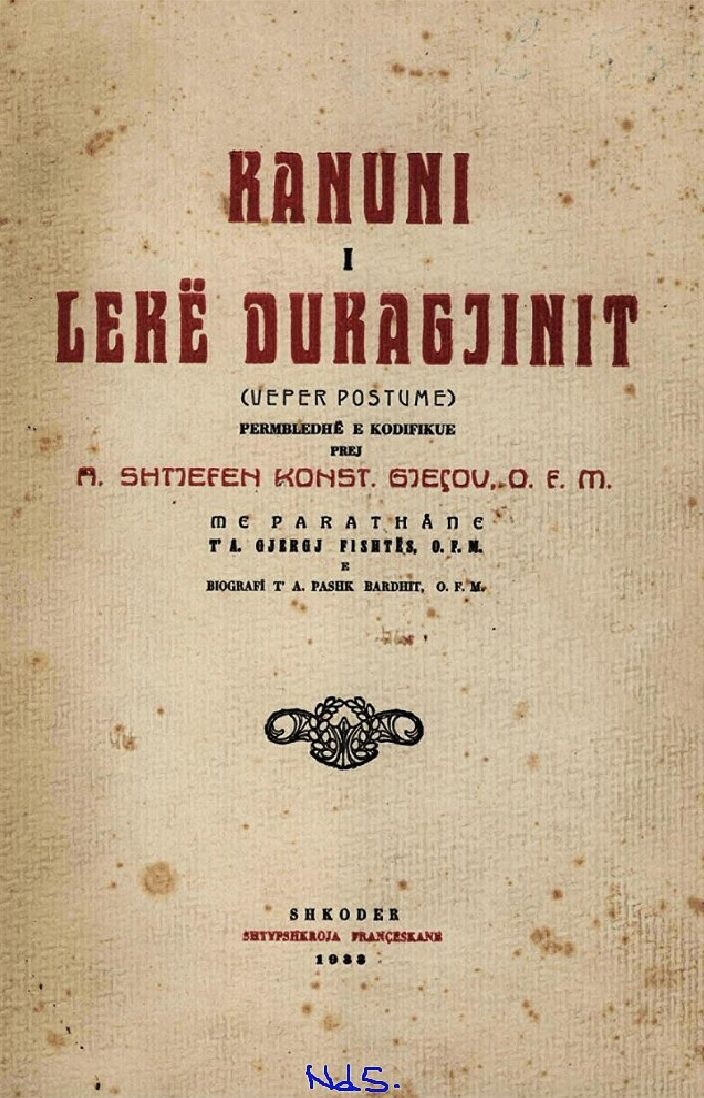
Kanuni i Lek Dukagjinit

The Kanun (also Gheg Albanian: Kanû/-ja, other names include Albanian: doke, zakon, venom, usull, itifatk, adet, sharte, udhë, rrugë) is a set of Albanian traditional customary laws, which has directed all the aspects of the Albanian tribal society.

For at least the last five centuries and into the present, Albanian customary laws have been kept alive only orally by the tribal elders. The success in preserving them exclusively through oral systems is an indication of ancient origins. Strong pre-Christian motifs mixed with motifs from the Christian era reflect the stratification of the Albanian customary law across various historical ages. The Kanun has held a sacred – although secular – longstanding, unwavering, and unchallenged authority with a cross-religious effectiveness over the Albanians, attributed to an earlier pagan code common to all Albanian tribes. The Albanian Kanun is regarded as a literary monument of interest to Indo-European studies, reflecting many legal practices of great antiquity with precise echoes in law codes of other Indo-European peoples, potentially inherited from the Proto-Indo-European culture.

Throughout history, Albanian customary laws have been changed and supplemented with new norms, in accordance with certain requirements of socio-economic development. Besa and nderi (honour) are of major importance in Albanian customary law as the cornerstone of personal and social conduct.

The first known codification of Albanian oral customary law was published by the Ottoman administration in the 19th century. Several regional Albanian customary laws have been collected and published during the 20th and 21st centuries, including The Kanun of Lekë Dukagjini, The Kanun of Skanderbeg and The Kanun of Labëria. During the years of the communist regime, the Albanian state abolished by law the customary practices. However, their exercise returned after the 1990s as a result of the collapse of state institutions in Albania and in Kosovo. In Albania, in particular, the exercise of customary law was observed especially in matters related to property law.

== Name ==
The term kanun comes from the Arabic word that means 'law', that was adopted into Ottoman Turkish. It originally comes from the early Greek word"κανών" ("canon"), meaning amongst others "pole" or "rule". The term was then used in Albania during the Ottoman rule. It was so widely used among Albanians that when something was legal it was said to be "kanun", and when not legal, "the kanun doesn't give it". The consuetudinary law was called "kanun". Baroness Von Godin thought it was the Ottomans that gave the name kanun and that the Albanian name Lek (Latin lex) was only later perceived as a proper name attributed to late Medieval nobleman of the Dukagjini family.

Aside from the term kanun other words of Turkish extract were used (usull, itifak, adet, sharte) or in the Albanian periphrase "rrugë" or "udhë" (way or path). In Martanesh and Çermenikë it was known as "kanun", in Toskëria it was known as "The Kanun of the Adet", in Labëria "The sharte of Idriz Suli", in the Bregu district Venomet e Himarës. but in Dibër, Kurbin, Bendë and Tamadhe it was called zakon (from slavonic законъ). According to Çabej, Camaj and Schmidt-Neke, the oldest Albanian word by which the customary law was known was doke, meaning "custom", "usance", "tradition" in Albanian.

== Origin ==
The Albanian customary law is among the Albanian literary monuments that are of interest to Indo-European studies, reflecting many legal practices of great antiquity that are shared with law codes followed by other Indo-European peoples, potentially inherited from the Proto-Indo-European culture. It has been pointed out that "The laws governing such matters as hospitality, the rights of the heads of households, marriage, blood-feuds and payment of damages find precise echoes in Vedic India and ancient Greece and Rome".

The stratification of the Albanian oral customary law across the various historical eras is reflected in its powerful pre-Christian motifs mixed with motifs from the Christian era. The Albanian Kanun contains several customary concepts that have their origins in pagan beliefs, including in particular the ancestor worship, animism and totemism, which have been preserved since ancient times. Comparing the Albanian Kanun of the Mountains with the Iliad and the Odyssey, the Japanese scholar Kazuhiko Yamamoto has concluded that the basic ethical concepts of the stateless social structure of the Homeric Age — 'faith', 'honor', 'blood', 'revenge', 'food', and 'guest' — are the same customary concepts of the Albanian tribal society. British anthropologist and writer Edith Durham has suggested that the Albanian Kanun likely dates back to the Bronze Age culture. Others further have conjectured that it may be the continuation of ancient Illyrian tribal laws.

Over time, Albanian customary laws have undergone their historical development, they have been changed and supplemented with new norms, in accordance with certain requirements of socio-economic development emerged throughout the ages: Classical antiquity, Roman, Byzantine, and Ottoman periods. Some scholars have defined the Albanian Kanun as a set of traditions which are more or less ancient and widespread in the Balkans and in the Mediterranean area, however it should be considered independently as a "customary code and a normative heritage" of a people who, on the basis of their own social sense, have created a legal system that was autonomous from the law enforced by the various conquerors. In other words, it can be defined as a 'constitution' of a stateless social system.

For at least the last five centuries and until today, the Kanun has been kept alive only orally by Albanian tribal elders. The success in preserving them exclusively through oral systems is an indication of ancient origins. In his codification of the Kanun Shtjefën Gjeçovi added footnotes in reference to the Roman law, and an earlier indigenous legal system that survived the Roman occupation can be seen in the doke.

== History ==
Albanian customs have been handed down through traditional memory systems that have survived intact into modern times in Albania, a phenomenon that is explained by the lack of state formation among Albanians and their ancestors – the Illyrians, being able to preserve their "tribally" organized society. This distinguished them from civilizations such as Ancient Egypt, Minoans and Mycenaeans, who underwent state formation and disrupted their traditional memory practices. According to some historical sources, the government of the Roman and Byzantine empire had to recognize autonomous customary laws to the various local communities for their self-administration. In this context, during different periods, Albanian customary laws were implemented in parallel with Roman, Byzantine, Ecclesiastic, and subsequently Sharia and Ottoman laws. This helped the Albanian mountain tribes to preserve their way of life, identity, and neutrality in the face of external centralizing administration.

In the context of religious perceptions, historical sources confirm the relations between the Greco-Roman religious ethics and the Albanian customary laws. These relations can be seen during the rule of the Illyrian emperors, such as Aurelian who introduced the cult of the Sun; Diocletian who stabilized the empire and ensured its continuation through the institution of the Tetrarchy; Constantine the Great who issued the Edict of Toleration for the Christianized population and who summoned the First Council of Nicaea involving many clercs from Illyricum; Justinian who issued the Corpus Juris Civilis and sought to create an Illyrian Church, building Justiniana Prima and Justiniana Secunda, which was intended to become the centre of Byzantine administration.

The Byzantine Empire ruled over Albanians for a long period of time, exercising with its institutions influence on the Albanians as well as on other Balkan ethnicities such as the Serbs. In the 11th century, the Albanioi are mentioned, having the same legal status (isopoliteia) as the Byzantines.

In the late Middle Ages Albanian cities codified statutes that included regulations from ancient local customary laws, developing their own legal tradition and achieving a form of local self-administration. In the Statutes of Scutari the verb bessare is thought to be a trace of Old Albanian, thence viewed as in relation to an early evidence of the Albanian institution of Besa. Historical sources from Ragusa mention "the Albanian customs of the Balsha". It has been argued that an article in Dušan's Code can be considered speculatively as an early attempt to clamp down on the self-administered Albanian customary law of the mountains, and if so, this would be an early evidence that such customary laws were in effect. Syrja Pupovci argues that although there is some similarity between the regulations made in Dušan's Code and the Kanun, concerning the legal matters related to the pastoral communities. The Kanun developed independently of the influences of the Dušan's Code. However, she does not exclude the possibility of mutual influence of similar tribal laws among the tribes of Montenegro and Herzegovina.

In 1492, the Sublime Porte officially recognized Himara its own customary law (Albanian: Venome) for self-government, as it was the center of the Labëria uprisings against the Ottoman Empire. When the Ottoman administration became acquainted with the social organization of the Albanian lands, around 1550 they mentioned the local customary law as Canun of the Mountains (Turkish: Xhibal Kanuni). In the 17th century an anonymous prepared a study in the Venetian language: Informazioni sopra origine e metodo delle arbitrarie in affari di sangue in Albania (sec. XVIII) interessante pei costumi (Reale Archivio Generale, Cancelleria Secreta, Cattaro e popolazioni confinarie) (Information on the origin and method of arbitration in the matter of blood-taking in Albania), addressed to the Republic of Venice in order to harmonize the state laws of Venice with the Kanun of the Albanians in the area from Kotor to Shkodra where the rule of the Venetian administration extended. The Venetian Senate did not approve the study because no other law was to be recognized in its provinces. In the same century, some English travelers who visited Himara wrote about a strong customary law implemented by the local population.

In his autonomous Pashalik, the Albanian ruler Ali Pasha enforced his own laws in addition to the Sharia for Muslims and Canon law for Christians, allowing only in rare cases the usage of local Albanian tribal customary laws. After annexing Suli and Himara into his semi-independent state in 1798, he sought to organize the judiciary in every city and province according to the principle of social equality, enforcing his laws for the entire population, both Muslims and Christians. To limit blood feud killings, Ali Pasha replaced blood feuds (Albanian: gjakmarrje) with other punishments such as blood payment or expulsion up to the death penalty. Ali Pasha also reached an agreement with the Kurveleshi population, not to trespass their territories, which at that time were larger than the area they inhabit today. Since the 18th century and continuously, blood feuds and their consequences in Labëria have been limited principally by the councils of elders. The mountain region of Kurveleshi represents the last example of a tribal system among southern Albanians, which was regulated by the Code of Zuli (Albanian: Kanuni i Papa Zhulit/Zulit or Kanuni i Idriz Sulit).

During the Tanzimat and the implementation of reforms, the Ottoman administration, in order to address the Albanian customary law which has been implemented along with the Ottoman law and Sharia, opened an office called "Shkodra Mountains Commission" (Turkish: Iskodra Xhibali Komisi), which was established in 1856–1858, based in Shkodra and with administrative and judicial power over the provinces. The Commission embodied the centralized attitudes of the imperial reforms and the approach it would have with local customary law in the bajrak areas and relied mainly on the Kanun of the Mountains (Turkish: Kanun-i Jhibal) with some Ottoman administrative element. In 1863 the bylykbashi of Gruda sent a letter to the sergeant asking for the Kanun-i Jhibal, giving reason to believe that a codification in Ottoman Turkish already existed. Parts of this codification have been published in twenty paragraphs in the salname of the Vilayet of Shkodra in 1894, which were published translated into Italian and French. The most important elements for the relationship between the Ottoman administration and the local population were: murder, blood feud, reconciliation, blood money, hospitality, theft, and tribal disputes.

== Development and usage ==
The Kanun of Lek Dukagjini was named after Lekë Dukagjini, a medieval prince who ruled in northern Albania and codified the customary laws of the highlands. The code was written down in the 19th century by Shtjefën Gjeçovi and partially published in the Hylli i Drites periodical in 1913. The full version appeared only in 1933 after Gjeçovi's death in 1926.

Although researchers of history and customs of Albania usually refer to Gjeçovi's text of the Kanuni as the only existing version which is uncontested and written by Lekë Dukagjini, it was actually incorrect. The text of the Kanuni, often contested and with many different interpretations which significantly evolved since 15th century, was codified and only named by Dukagjini.

Although the laws are attributed to Lekë Dukagjini, the laws evolved over time as a way to bring order to these lands. The Kanun is divided into 12 sections, and Gjeçovi's version has 1,262 articles regulating all aspects of the mountainous life: economic organisation of the household, hospitality, brotherhood, clan, boundaries, work, marriage, land, and so on. The Besa (personal honour, compare with Lat. fides) and nderi (family honour, Lat. honor) are of prime importance throughout the code as the cornerstone of personal and social conduct. The Kanun applies to both Christian and Muslim Albanians.

Some of the Kanun's most controversial rules (in particular book 10 section 3) specify how murder is to be handled, which in the past (and sometimes still now) would lead to blood feuds lasting until all men of the two involved families were killed. In situations of murder, tribal law stipulates the principle of koka për kokë (head for a head) where the relatives of the victim are obliged to seek gjakmarrja (blood vengeance). Regarded simply as producers of offspring, women are referred to in a discriminatory manner and not considered worthy targets as such. In some parts of the country, the Kanun resembles the Italian vendetta. These rules resurfaced in the 1990s in Northern Albania, as people had no faith in the powerless local government and police. There are organizations that try to mediate between feuding families and try to get them to "pardon the blood" (Albanian: Falja e Gjakut), but often the only resort is for men of age to stay in their homes, which are considered a safe refuge by the Kanuni, or flee the country. Tribal laws also held that thieves would need to pay fines for the relative amount that was stolen.

Albanian tribes from the Dibra region (known as the "Tigers of Dibra") governed themselves according to the Law of Skanderbeg.

The Albanian Bytyqi, Gashi, Gruda, Trieshi, Hoti, Kastrati, Kelmendi, Krasniqi, Shkrel, and Kuçi tribes are known to follow the Kanuni i Malësisë së Madhë, a variant of the Kanun. Its implementation extends from these tribal regions around Shkodër to the Highlands of Gjakova.

Former communist leader of Albania Enver Hoxha effectively stopped the practice of Kanun with hard repression and a strong state police. After Communism's fall some communities, however, have tried to rediscover the old traditions, but some of their parts have been lost, leading to fears of misinterpretation. In 2014, about 3,000 Albanian families were estimated to be involved in blood feuds; since the fall of Communism this has led to the deaths of 10,000 people. There is extensive debate on the number of blood feuds and deaths in the present day, a major factor being the use of blood feuds in asylum applications. Cedoca reported in 2017 that, according to Albanian State Police Headquarters, from 2013 to March 2017, there were five deaths related to blood feuds; that said, the British embassy in Tirana claims that police 'tend to estimate the lowest numbers' when reporting the population involved in blood feuds. Albanian Daily News reported in 2018 that one man had died due to a blood feud.

== Codifications ==
The first known codification of Albanian oral customary law is Lek Dukagin Kanunu ("The Kanun of Lekë Dukagjini") by the Ottoman administration, published in 1872 in Prizren, and written in Ottoman Turkish. Albanian oral customary laws have been collected in different regions and published during the 20th and 21st centuries:

- The Old Kanun (Kanun of Lekë Dukagjini) (Albanian: Kanun i vjetër, Kanuni i Lekë Dukagjinit);
  - The Kanun of Mirdita (Albanian: Kanuni i Mirditës);
  - The Kanun of Pukë (Albanian: Kanuni i Pukës);
- The Kanun of Skanderbeg (Albanian: Kanuni i Skënderbeut) also known as The Kanun of Arbëria (Albanian: Kanuni i Arbërisë).
  - The Kanun of Dibra (Albanian: Kanuni i Dibrës);
- The Kanun of Çermenikë (Albanian: Kanuni i Çermenikës);
- The Kanun of Labëria (Albanian: Kanuni i Labërisë), also known as The Kanun of Papa Zhuli (Kanuni i Papa Zhulit) or Kanun of Idriz Suli (Kanuni i Idriz Sulit).

== Translations ==
German Baroness Marie Amelie von Godin, in collaboration with Eqrem Vlora, at the request of the Franciscans, started from the year 1938 the systematic translation in German of the Kanun of Lekë Dukagjini on the basis of an earlier codification in Albanian by Gjeçovi. It was published in the 1950s, shortly before the author's death. Von Godin's work was republished in 2001, edited by Robert Elsie with an introduction by Michael Schmidt-Neke. An Italian translation of the Kanun of Lekë Dukagjini was published in 1941, translated by the Franciscan Pal Dodaj, and edited by Gjergj Fishta and Giuseppe Schirò, with the introduction by Federico Pateta, and republished in 2009 with the introduction by Donato Martucci. A dual English-Albanian version of the Kanun of Lekë Dukagjini was published in 1989, and then republished in 1992. An Italian translation of the Kanun of Skanderbeg was published in 2017, translated by Genc Lafe and edited by Donato Martucci.

== Content ==
The Kanun is based on four pillars:

- Honour (Albanian: Nderi)
- Hospitality (Albanian: Mikpritja)
- Right Conduct (Albanian: Sjellja)
- Kin Loyalty (Albanian: Fis)

The Kanun of Lek Dukagjini

The Kanun of Lekë Dukagjini is composed of 12 books and 1,262 articles. The books and their subdivisions are as follows:

1. Church;
  1. The Church
  2. Cemeteries
  3. Property of the Church
  4. The Priest
  5. Church workers
2. Family;
  1. The family make-up
3. Marriage;
  1. Engagement
  2. Wedding
  3. The Kanun of the groom
  4. In-laws
  5. Separation
  6. Inheritance
4. House, Livestock and Property;
  1. The house and its surroundings
  2. Livestock
  3. Property
  4. The boundary
5. Work;
  1. Work
  2. Hunting
  3. Commerce
6. Transfer of Property;
  1. Borrowing
  2. Gifts
7. Spoken Word;
8. Honor;
  1. Individual honor
  2. Social honor
  3. 'Blood' and gender; brotherhood and godparents
9. Damages;
10. Law Regarding Crimes
  1. Criminals
  2. Stealing
  3. Murder (discussion of sanctioning of blood feuds)
11. The kanun of the elderly
12. Exemptions and Exceptions
  1. Types of exceptions
  2. Death

== Kanun in literature and film ==
Albanian writer Ismail Kadare evokes the Kanun several times in his books, and it is the main theme in his novel Broken April. He also evokes the kanun in his novel Komisioni i festës (English: The Celebration Commission), where Kadare literally describes the Monastir massacre of 1830 as the struggle between two empires: the Albanian Kanun with its code of besa and the Ottoman Empire itself. According to Kadare in his literary critique book Eskili, ky humbës i madh (English: "Aeschylus, this big loser"), where loser refers to the great number of tragedies that were lost from Aeschylus, there are evident similarities between the kanun and the vendetta customs in all Mediterranean countries.

Barbara Nadel's Deep Waters refers to Kanun and Gjakmarrja.

Joshua Marston's 2011 film The Forgiveness of Blood, a drama set in modern-day Albania, deals with the Kanun. The film relates a blood feud between two families in Northern Albania, focusing primarily on how the feud affects the children of one family.

In season 6, episode 9 of Law & Order: Criminal Intent ("Blasters") the Kanun is referred to as explanation for the sudden retreat of a group of Albanian assassins.

The Kanun plays a major role in the Belgian movie Dossier K.

Elvira Dones' Sworn Virgin refers to Kanun and women's practice of swearing celibacy in return for being accepted as men by all local villagers.

Belgian TV maker Tom Waes visited Albania during one of the shows in his series Reizen Waes. He was served spit-roasted goat and was offered the goat's head, in keeping with Kanun rules about honoring a guest at dinner.

The Kanun is referred to in The Closer; Season 6 | Episode 14: "The investigation into the Albanian blood feud".

Rene Karabash's She Who Remains is about a young Albanian woman who breaks an engagement by becoming a sworn virgin, which sets off a blood feud under the Kanun.

== See also ==
- History of Albania
- History of Kosovo
- Constitution of Albania
- Blood money
- Honour killing
- Blood Law
- Love

== Sources ==
- Anonymous (1872). Lek Dukagin Kanunu [The Kanun of Lekë Dukagjini] (in Ottoman Turkish). Prizren. (31 pages).
- Arsovska, Jana (2006). "Gender-based Subordination and Trafficking of Women in Ethnic Albanian Context. The Upward Revaluation of the Kanun Morality". Kolor. Journal on Moving Communities. 6 (1). Garant: 3–18. ISBN 90-441-2008-5.
- Belgiorno de Stefano, Maria Gabriella (2014). "La coesistenza delle religioni in Albania. Le religioni in Albania prima e dopo la caduta del comunismo". Stato, Chiese e Pluralismo Confessionale (in Italian) (6). ISSN 1971-8543.
- Bardhoshi, Nebi (2013). "The Ethnography of Law in a Dictatorial Situation". In Aleksandar Boskovic; Chris Hann (eds.). The Anthropological Field on the Margins of Europe, 1945-1991. LIT Verlag Münster. ISBN 978-3-643-90507-9.
- Camaj, Martin (1989). "Foreword". In Gjeçovi, Shtjefën; Fox, Leonard (eds.). Kanuni i Lekë Dukagjinit [The Kanun of Lekë Dukagjini]. Translated by Fox, Leonard. Gjonlekaj Publishing Company. ISBN 978-0-9622141-0-3.
- Cancik, Hubert; Schneider, Helmuth (2002). Brill's New Pauly Encyclopaedia of the Ancient World. Classical Tradition. Brill. ISBN 90-04-14221-5.
- Cook, Bernard (2001). Europe Since 1945: An Encyclopedia. Vol. 1. Garland Publishing. ISBN 0-8153-4057-5.
- Cullhaj, Florian (2016). Democratization from Within: Political Culture and the Consolidation of Democracy in Post-Communist Albania. Edizioni Nuova Cultura. pp. 222–223. ISBN 978-88-6812-825-8.
- Dojaka, Abaz (1979). "Zgjidhja e martesës në Shqipëri". Etnografia shqiptare. Vol. 10. Tiranë: Akademia e Shkencave e RPSH, Instituti i Historisë, Sektori i Etnografisë. p. 10.
- Durham, Edith (1928). High Albania. LO Beacon Press. ISBN 978-0-8070-7035-2.
- Elezi, Ismet (1994). E drejta zakonore e Labërisë në planin Krahasues [The Customary Law of Labëria in Comparative Perspective]. Tiranë: Shtëpia Botuese Libri Universitar.
- Elezi, Ismet (2006) [2002]. Kanuni i Labërisë [The Kanun of Labëria]. Tiranë: Botimet Toena.
- Elsie, Robert (2001). A Dictionary of Albanian Religion, Mythology, and Folk Culture. NYU Press. p. 149. ISBN 978-0-8147-2214-5.
- Elsie, Robert (2014). Der Kanun: Das albanische Gewohnheitsrecht nach dem sogenannten Kanun des Lekë Dukagjini. Edition Südosteuropaforschungen (in German). Vol. 4. OEZ Berlin-Verlag. ISBN 978-3-942437-33-2.
- Elsie, Robert (2015). The Tribes of Albania: History, Society and Culture. I.B.Tauris. ISBN 9780857739322.
- Fortson, Benjamin Wynn IV (2010). Indo-European Language and Culture: An Introduction (2nd ed.). Wiley-Blackwell. ISBN 978-1-4443-5968-8.
- Galaty, Michael L. (2002). "Modeling the Formation and Evolution of an Illyrian Tribal System: Ethnographic and Archaeological Analogs". In William A. Parkinson (ed.). The Archaeology of Tribal Societies. Berghahn Books. ISBN 1-78920-171-3.
- Galaty, Michael L. (2018). Memory and Nation Building: From Ancient Times to the Islamic State. Rowman & Littlefield. ISBN 9780759122628.
- Gawrych, George (2006). The Crescent and the Eagle: Ottoman rule, Islam and the Albanians, 1874–1913. London: IB Tauris. p. 36. ISBN 9781845112875.
- Genesin, Monica (2014). "Alcune osservazioni sulla terminologia relativa ai rapporti fra i sessi nei Kanun delle montagne albanesi". Palaver (in Italian). 3 (1): 253–288.
- Gjeçovi, Shtjefën; Fox, Leonard, eds. (1989). Kanuni i Lekë Dukagjinit [The Kanun of Lekë Dukagjini]. Translated by Fox, Leonard. Gjonlekaj Publishing Company. ISBN 978-0-9622141-0-3.
- Gjeçovi, Shtjefën; Logoreci, Anton; Fox, Leonard, eds. (1992). Code of Leke Dukagjini. Translated by Martin Camaj. Gjonlekaj Publishing Company. ISBN 0-9622141-0-8. Archived from the original on 2005-10-27.
- Hasluck, Margaret (2015) [1954]. Hutton, J. H. (ed.). The Unwritten Law in Albania. Cambridge University Press. ISBN 9781107586932.
- Hetzer, Armin (1980). Trofenik, R. (ed.). "Die strafrechtliche Terminologie in der albanischen Sprache". Zeitschrift für Balkanologie (in German). 16–18.
- Illia, Frano (1993). Kanuni i Skanderbegut. Milot: Editrice La Rosa.
- Imbriani, Eugenio (2019). "Donato Martucci, Genc Lafe, Il Kanun di Skanderbeg. Con la traduzione integrale del Kanuni i Skanderbegut di Frano Illia, Lecce, Grifo, 2017". Palaver (in Italian). 8 (2): 321–323. ISSN 2280-4250.
- Joseph, Brian D.; Costanzo, Angelo; Slocum, Jonathan. "Albanian Online – Lesson 4: Geg". University of Texas at Austin.
- Lafe, Genc (2021). "On the semantic evolution of Albanian motër 'sister' and vajzë 'girl' in the context of the Albanian extended family". Palaver. 10 (1): 75–96. doi:10.1285/i22804250v10i1p75. ISSN 2280-4250.
- Malcolm, Noel (1998). Kosovo: A short history. London: Macmillan. ISBN 978-0-333-66612-8.
- Mangalakova, Tanya (2004). "The Kanun in Present-Day Albania, Kosovo, and Montenegro". International Centre for Minority Studies and Intercultural Relations. Sofia.
- Martini, Xhafer (2003). Kanuni i maleve të Dibrës. Tiranë: Arbëria.
- Martucci, Donato (2010). I Kanun delle montagne albanesi: fonti, fondamenti e mutazioni del diritto tradizionale albanese. Edizioni di Pagina. ISBN 9788874701223.
- Martucci, Donato; Lafe, Genc, eds. (2017). Il Kanun di Skanderbeg: con la traduzione integrale del Kanuni i Skanderbegut di Frano Illia. Iuridica historica. Vol. 5. Grifo (Cavallino). ISBN 9788869941252.
- Martucci, Donato (2017). "Le consuetudini giuridiche albanesi tra oralità e scrittura". Palaver. 2: 73–106. ISSN 2280-4250.
- Meçi, Xhemal (1997). Kanuni i Lekë Dukagjinit. Varianti i Pukës [The Kanun of Lekë Dukagjini. Puka Variant]. Tiranë: Çabej MCM.
- Meçi, Xhemal (2002). Kanuni i Lekë Dukagjinit: në variantin e Mirditës [The Kanun of Lekë Dukagjini. Mirdita Variant]. Tiranë: Geer.
- Muhadri, Bedri (2020). "Kosova në kuadrin e Principatës së Balshajve" [Kosovo as Part of the Balshaj Principality]. Studime Historike (in Albanian) (1–2). Albanian Institute of History. ISSN 0563-5799.
- Omari, Anila (2012). Marrëdhëniet gjuhësore shqiptaro-serbe. Kristalina KH.
- Pritchard, Eleanor (2014). Albanian Law and Nation-Building in Northern Albania and Kosovo. Oxford.
- Reinkowski, Maurus (2005). "Gewohnheitsrecht im multinationalen Staat: Die Osmanen und der albanische Kanun". Rechtspluralismus in der Islamischen Welt: Gewohnheitsrecht zwischen Staat und Gesellschaft. Vol. 16. Walter de Gruyter. pp. 121–142. ISBN 9783110184556.
- Rojas Molina, Grabiela (2022). Decoding Debate in the Venetian Senate: Short Stories of Crisis and Response on Albania (1392-1402). The Medieval Mediterranean. Vol. 134. BRILL. ISBN 9789004520936.
- Rushani, Mirie (1997). La vendetta ed il perdono nella tradizione consuetudinaria albanese (in Italian). Religioni e Società. pp. 137–152.
- Shtjefen Konstantin Gjeçov (1933). Pashk Bardhi (Biografí), Gjergj Fishta (Parathâne) (ed.). Kanuni i Lekë Dukagjinit: Veper postume. Permbledhë e kodifikue. Shkodër: Shtypshkroja Françeskane.
- Tarifa, Fatos (2008). "Of Time, Honor, and Memory: Oral Law in Albania" (PDF). Oral Tradition. 23 (1): 3–14. doi:10.1353/ort.0.0017.
- Trnavci, Genc (2010). "The Interaction of Customary Law with the Modern Rule of Law in Albania and Kosova". In Sellers, Mortimer; Tomaszewski, Tadeusz (eds.). The Rule of Law in Comparative Perspective. Ius Gentium: Comparative Perspectives on Law and Justice. Vol. 3. Springer Verlag. pp. 201–215. ISBN 978-90-481-3748-0.
- Ulqini, Kahreman (1991). Bajraku në organizimin e vjetër shoqëror (in Albanian). Tiranë: Akademia e Shkencave e RPS të Shqipërisë: Instituti i Kulturës Popullore.
- Yamamoto, Kazuhiko (2002). "The Ethical Structure of Homeric Society". Collegium Antropologicum. 26 (2): 695–709. PMID 12528301.
- Yamamoto, Kazuhiko (2005). The ethical structure of Kanun and its cultural implications. Melosi Design. ISBN 9780972992398.
- Young, Antonia (2000). Women Who Become Men Albanian Sworn Virgins. Bloomsbury Academic. ISBN 978-1-85973-340-0.
- Zeqo, Moikom (2002). Zgjidhja e mosmarrëveshjeve sipas Kanunit të shqiptarëve në optikën e të huajve (in Albanian). Pajtimi 1.
- Zojzi, Rrok (1956). Kanuni i Labërisë [The Code of Labëria]. Tirana: Institute of Folk Culture Archives.
