= Syreja Vlora =

Ottoman-Albanian politician

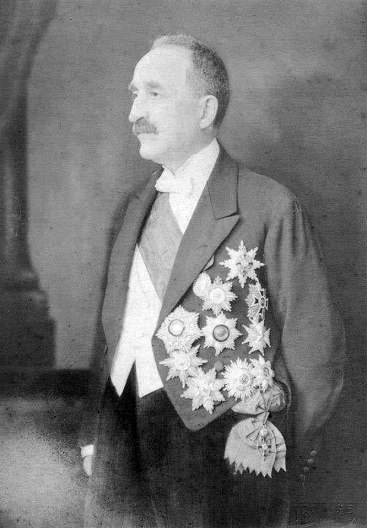
- Born: 1860; Vlorë, Ottoman Empire (modern day Albania)
- Died: 1940 (aged 79–80); Switzerland
- Occupation: Politician
- Known for: Albanian Declaration of Independence
- Spouse: Mihri Vlora (née Toptani)
- Children: Eqerem bej Vlora
- Relatives: Mehmed Ferid Pasha (brother)
- Family: Vlora

Syreja Vlora (1860–1940), usually referred to as Syrja Bey Vlora (Turkish: Avlonyalı Süreyya Bey), was an Ottoman Albanian politician, an active figure of the Albanian Declaration of Independence in 1912 and one of the delegates of the Assembly of Vlorë.

== Biography ==
Syrja Bey was born in Vlorë, then in the Ottoman Empire, today in Albania in 1860. He was a member of the distinguished wealthy landowning Vlora family, historically successful through the ranks of Ottoman administration and military for almost 4 centuries. He was the brother of the Grand Vizier Avlonyalı Ferid Paşa (1851-1914) and both were sons of Mustafa Pashë Vlora. Vlora was also related to Ismail Qemali, both being political rivals at the same time. He was married to the cousin of Essad Toptani. During the late Ottoman period, Vlora served as economic advisor to sultan Abdul Hamid II.

Before the creation of the Albanian state, he also held the positions of General Director of the Customs of the Ottoman Empire, and was a representative in the Ottoman Parliament from 1908. Vlora thought that, if Albanians were not ready for independence, a future autonomous Albania becoming a protectorate under Austria-Hungary in the event of the collapse of the Ottoman Empire would be favorable. In 1911 Vlora wrote a chapter on Albanian history focusing on the Ottoman era and subjects like Skanderbeg and Ali Pasha of Yanina in a book titled Musaver Arnavud (The Illustrated Albanian) in Ottoman Turkish by Dervish Hima.

In 1912 during the Albanian revolt and aftermath of the Ottoman parliamentary elections, Syrja Vlora parliamentarian for Berat and Essad Toptani for Durrës represented the Albanian side in a parliamentary discussion with the Young Turks. Both called for the cessation of government force and implementation of good governance to alleviate the situation in Albanian lands. After the Declaration of Independence of Albania during November 1912 in his home town, where he was a delegate for the Përmet region, he held minor political positions, known mainly as the Albanian Ambassador in Vienna in 1914.

He was the father of the Albanian politician and scholar Ekrem Bey Vlora. Together they had negotiated for Albanian independence in Austria during the pre-independence European tour of Ismail Qemali.

He died in 1940, in Switzerland.
