= Luan Qerimi =

Albanian actor (1929–2018)

- Born: 15 October 1929; Lushnjë, Albania
- Died: 2 December 2018 (aged 89); Tirana, Albania
- Occupation: Actor

Luan Qerimi (15 October 1929 – 2 December 2018) was an Albanian actor. He was known for his work in theater, and has performed in plays by William Shakespeare (Othello, Hamlet) and Bertold Brecht (The Resistible Rise of Arturo Ui) in addition to works by Albanian dramatists such as Kolë Jakova and Ekrem Kryeziu.

He also made a few films, and worked with Albanian directors such as Dhimitër Anagnosti. In 1989, Qerimi was named an Artist of Merit by the government of Albania.
