= Vladimir Prifti =

Albanian film director and screenwriter (1942–2023)

- Born: 1 June 1942; Tirana, Italian-occupied Albania
- Died: 5 November 2023 (aged 81); Tirana, Albania
- Education: Academy of Arts
- Occupations: Film director Screenwriter

Vladimir Prifti (1 June 1942 – 5 November 2023) was an Albanian film director, screenwriter, and producer.

== Biography ==
Born in Tirana on 1 June 1942, Prifti studied at the Academy of Arts and started working as an actor at the National Theatre. He made his stage debut in the Dritëro Agolli play Fytyra e dyte. In 1974, he began working for RTSH. He first directed the film The General of the Dead Army in 1976 for Albanian television and directed eight feature films in total. In 2000, he shifted his focus towards documentary films. His 2002 documentary Butrinti was awarded at the 10th International Archaeological Film Festival in Kiel. He conducted classes with students at the University of Arts, Tirana and the Marubi Academy of Film and Multimedia.

Prifti was honored as a Merited Artist. In 2012, he was awarded by President Bamir Topi.

Vladimir Prifti died in Tirana on 5 November 2023, at the age of 81.

== Filmography ==
- The General of the Dead Army (1976)
- Udha e shkronjave (1978)
- Kur hidheshin themelet (1978)
- Era e ngrohtë e thellësive (1982)
- Kush vdes në këmbë (1984)
- Dhe vjen një ditë (1986)
- Flutura në kabinën time (1988)
- Sako's Wedding (1998)
- Të bekuarit (2000)
- Butrinti (2002)
- Legjenda e Baltës (2003)
- Rruga Egnatia (2005)
