= Shtjefën Gjeçovi =

Albanian priest and scholar

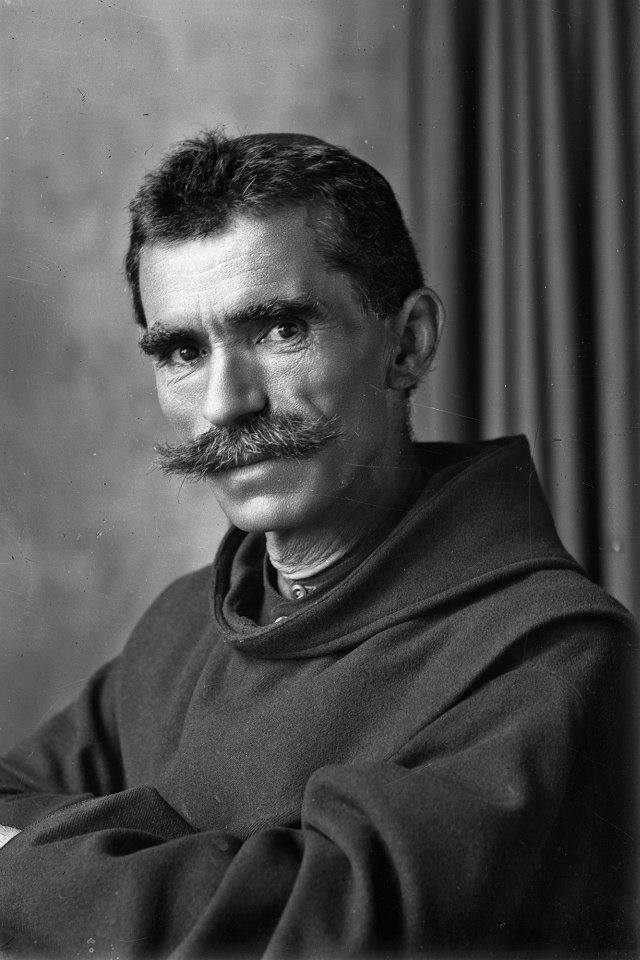
- Gjeçovi, 1920s
- Born: 12 July 1874; Janjevo, Lipjan, Sanjak of Prizren, Ottoman Empire (now Kosovo)
- Died: 14 October 1929 (aged 55); Zym, Kingdom of Yugoslavia (now Kosovo)
- Occupations: Catholic priest, ethnologist and folklorist
- Known for: Albanian folklore studies

Shtjefën Konstantin Gjeçovi-Kryeziu (12 July 1874 – 14 October 1929) was an Albanian Catholic priest, nationalist, ethnologist, and folklorist from Kosovo. He is regarded as the father of Albanian folklore studies.

== Life ==
Gjeçovi was born on 12 July 1874 (some sources mention 3 October 1873) in Janjevo, Prizren Vilayet, Ottoman Empire (now Kosovo). He was educated by the Franciscans in Bosnia (under control of Austria-Hungary) and moved to Ottoman Albania in 1896, having become a priest, and spent the years between 1905 and 1920 among the Albanian highland tribes, collecting oral literature, tribal law, archaeology and folklore. Gjeçovi was also an important collector of the Albanian Songs of the Frontier Warriors.

An Albanian patriot and a diligent researcher on everything related to the Albanian past, he was loathed by the Serbian population and the local authorities. He was shot on 14 October 1929, in the village of Zym near Gjakovë (at the time part of Yugoslavia) while serving as the local priest and teacher by a Serbian nationalist. Father Pashk Bardhi, in his biography (foreword of the Kanun) describes his death with these words:

"On October 13, 1929, two people dressed in military uniform informed Father Shtjefën that the prefect was summoning him to Prizren. The next day, with a policeman from the municipality and the postman, he left and went to Prizren, informing the bishop about the summon that the prefect had made. Then he went to the prefect, but the latter told him that he had not called him. Because of this, father Gjeçov was afraid that some ambush would be prepared for him, so he returned to the bishop and reported what had happened. The bishop wanted to stop him from returning to Zjum that day. But, after his two friends who had come with him were about to leave, he was afraid that he would return alone the next day, and therefore he returned that day with the two he had come with. After they crossed the Drin, passing a bosket, he was shot with a rifle and a bullet hit him near his right eye. The two of his companions, unarmed, ran away; after he fell to the ground, the two murderers came face to face. They were two people dressed in soldiers' uniform, probably the same ones who had brought him the news that the prefect had called him. After insulting Father Gjeçov with the most vile words, they shot him six more times and left him dead. This happened on October 14, 1929, at 3 o'clock in the afternoon".

There are monuments in his honour at Zym, as well as in Janjevo, along with the house he was born and raised becoming his museum. His grave is in the Karashëngjergj village not far from Zym, and is a place of pilgrimage.

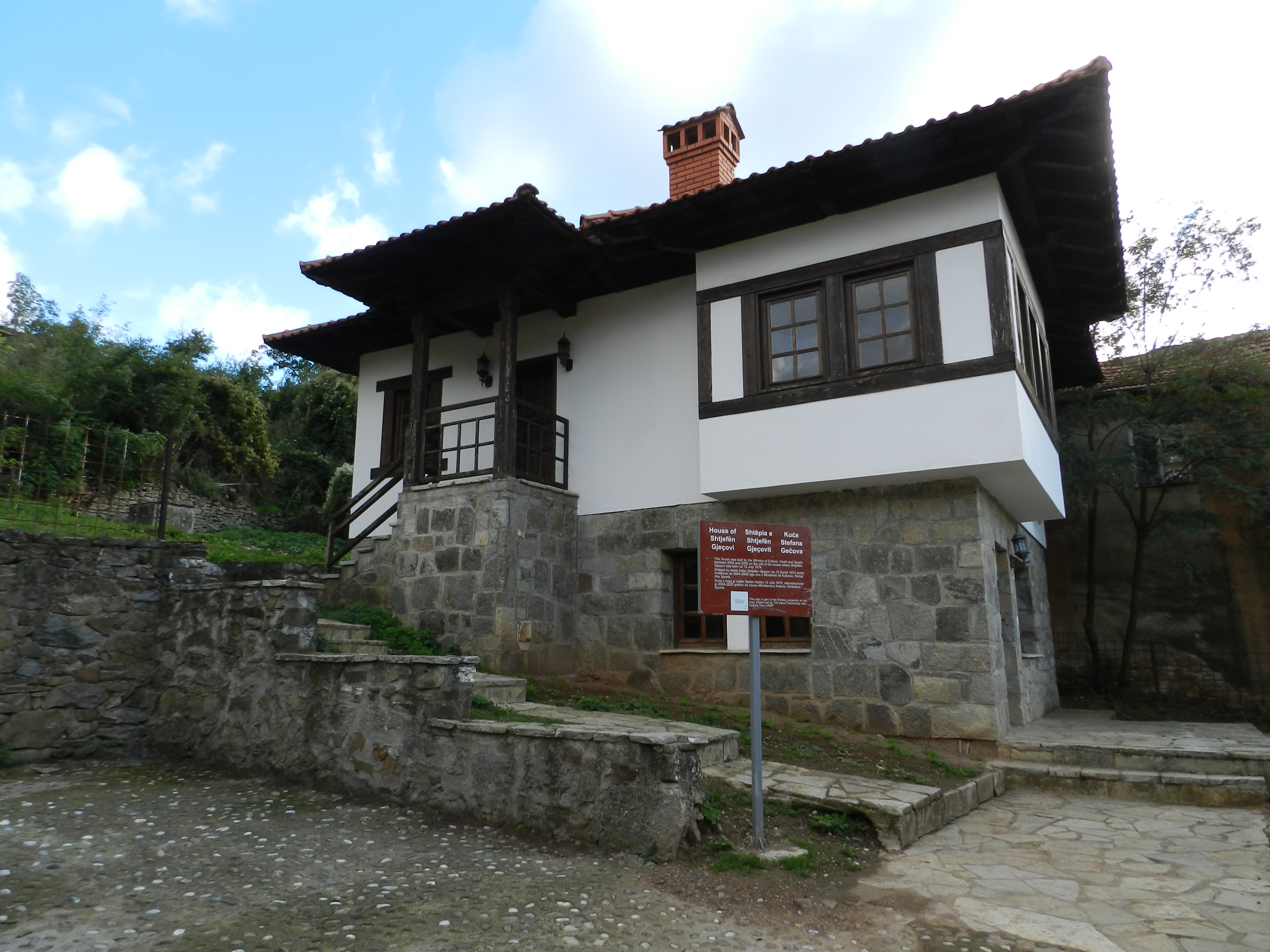
Gjeçovi's home in Janjevo

Several schools in Kosovo and Albania bear his name. "Traces of Gjeçovi" (Albanian: Gjurmë të Gjeçovit), is a yearly event held in his birthplace Janjevo since 2000, to memorialize and promote his work and legacy.

== Kanuni i Lekë Dukagjinit ==
Gjeçovi collected and wrote Kanuni i Lekë Dukagjinit, a set of traditional Albanian customary laws that was published in 1933. Although researchers of history and customs of Albania usually refer to Gjeçovi's text of the Kanun as the only existing version which is uncontested and written by Lekë Dukagjini, it was actually incorrect. The text of the Kanun, often contested and with many different interpretations, was only named after Dukagjini. The customary laws were not static in period between 15th and 20th century and one of the main reasons for Gjeçovi's work on the Kanun was to adapt it to correspond with the changes in the society of Albania.

== See also ==
- Kosovo Albanians
- Roman Catholicism in Kosovo
