= Broken April =

Novel by Albanian author Ismail Kadare

- Cover of the November 2003 paperback edition.
- Author: Ismail Kadare
- Original title: Prilli i Thyer
- Translator: New Amsterdam Books
- Language: Albanian
- Publisher: Librairie Arthème Fayard
- Publication date: 1978
- Publication place: Albania
- Media type: Paperback
- Pages: 192
- ISBN: 0-09-944987-0
- OCLC: 52919441

Broken April (Albanian: Prilli i thyer) is a novel by Albanian author Ismail Kadare. Published in 1978, the book explores one of Kadare's recurring themes: how the past affects the present. The novel focuses on the centuries-old traditions of hospitality, blood feuds, and revenge killing in the highlands of north Albania in the 1930s. It was translated into English by John Hodgson for New Amsterdam Books in 1990.

== Plot ==
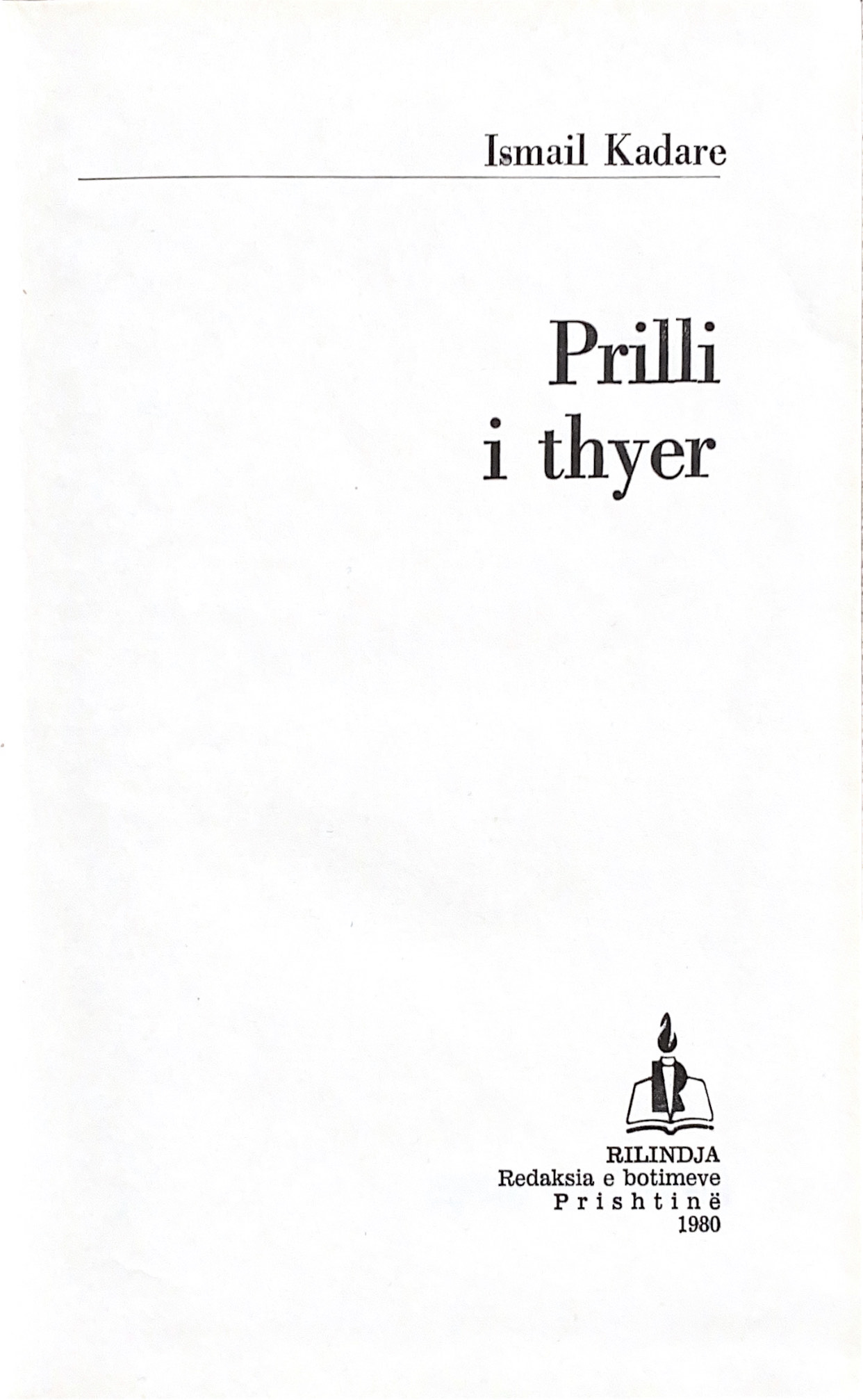
Titular page of Broken April, published in 1980 by Rilindja.

Gjorg Berisha, a 26-year-old Albanian man living on the country's high plateau, is forced to commit a murder under the laws of the Kanun to avenge his brother. As a result of this killing, his own death is sealed; he is to be killed by a member of the opposing family. Gjorg must travel to a distant kulla, a temporary safe haven for persons targeted by blood feuds.

Meanwhile, the writer Bessian and his young new bride, Diana, are travelling from Tirana to the Northern Plateu for their honeymoon. Throughout the trip, Bessian exhibits a morbid excitement with the Kanun and particularly the blood feuds, while Diana is shaken by the law's brutality. On their way to the same kulla, the couple encounter Gjorg. Without words, Gjorg and Diana seem to make an impression on one another. Diana spends the rest of her trip thinking about Gjorg, while Gjorg leaves the kulla early to go searching for her carriage.

Later in the novel, Diana runs from Bessian to go see Gjorg in the kulla, where she is not allowed, but does not find him. Bessian retrieves her and their trip ends early, with Diana left jaded by her time in the mountains and Bessian regretting the trip. Meanwhile, Gjorg receives word of where Diana's carriage was last spotted, but is killed on his way there.

== Themes ==
The title ‘Broken April’ is meant to represent the April that Gjorg is granted a short amount of time to live under a ‘bessa,’ after which he will be killed, splitting the month into the half he lives and the half he dies.

=== Criticism of the Kanun ===
The contrast between the Vorpsis and Gjorg is meant to represent the place of the Kanun between modernity and tradition, the urban elite and the rural life of the Northern Plateau.Throughout the novel, Bessian observes the Northern plateau as a tourist, exoticizing the blood-feud, the Kanun, and hospitality customs, while dehumanizing Northerners like Gjorg in the process. A chapter from the perspective of the region’s prince’s bookkeeper demonstrates the economic incentives of the Kanun in the form of taxes paid by those participating in the blood feuds. Kadare criticizes the place of the Kanun in the pain it brings to the Albanians who must follow it out of tradition, like Gjorg, and the Albanians that admire it as cultural monument without considering the tragedy behind it.

At the same time, Kadare acknowledges the difficulties of life in the Northern Plateau, such as the lack of formal dispute resolution, that have made the Kanun unavoidable at times. It is depicted in contradictions, both unchanging and vulnerable, inevitable and needing enforcement, mythic and bureaucratic, all from the differing perspectives of those governed by it, governing it, and observing it from afar, with Thomas Jones of London Review of Book's stating: “The only quality of the Kanun that isn’t in dispute is its pervasiveness.”

=== Performance, tragedy, and tradition ===
Throughout the book, the tradition of the blood feud is played out through the lens of performance – Gjorg feels like he is acting a role in a play someone else has written when he kills his target, the victim’s weeping family members behave as if they are in a Greek tragedy, and Gjorg imagines every family member on both sides donning “that bloodstained mask” as a mark of their participation. This comparison is meant to demonstrate a sense of helplessness or loss of control in the name of tradition, which itself feels overly familiar due to how often it has been repeated, like a play.

When Kadare was asked how Broken April has spoken to so many across various cultures, his answer reflects this theme in the book, universalizing the Kanun as a common tragedy: “The code you are talking about isn’t just Albanian, and contrary to what is sometimes claimed, it didn’t come from the cultures of the Caucasus. It originated in ancient Greece, and the most ancient of the Greek tragedies deals with the Kanun. The world has forgotten Agamemnon and the vengeance that led to his death. Hamlet is also a tragedy about the Kanun: The father’s ghost demands that his son avenge him. “

== Reception ==
Broken April was lauded by reviewers upon its release. The New York Times, reviewing it, wrote: "Broken April is written with masterly simplicity in a bardic style, as if the author is saying: Sit quietly and let me recite a terrible story about a blood feud and the inevitability of death by gunfire in my country. You know it must happen because that is the way life is lived in these mountains. Insults must be avenged; family honor must be upheld...." The Wall Street Journal declared Kadare "one of the most compelling novelists now writing in any language."

Reading "Broken April", it is easy to understand why and with what strength Ismail Kadare is passionate about tragedy and its two most prominent representatives, Shakespeare and Aeschylus. "Friendship, loyalty, and feud are the wheels of the mechanism of ancient tragedy, and to enter into their mechanism is to see the possibility of tragedy."

== Adaptations ==
In 2001, a movie adaptation of Broken April, called Behind the Sun (Abril Despedaçado), was filmed in Brazil. It was made by filmmaker Walter Salles. Set in 1910 Brazil and starring Rodrigo Santoro, it was nominated for a BAFTA Award for Best Film Not in the English Language and a Golden Globe Award for Best Foreign Language Film. The flashback portions of the 2006 Telugu feature film Pournami were also inspired by Behind the Sun, which in turn, was based on the novel.
