= Feud =

Long-running argument or fight

A feud /fjuːd/, also known in more extreme cases as a blood feud, vendetta, faida, clan war, gang war, private war, or mob war, is a long-running argument or fight, often between social groups of people, especially families or clans. Feuds begin because one party perceives itself to have been attacked, insulted, injured, or otherwise wronged by another. Intense feelings of resentment trigger an initial retribution, which causes the other party to feel greatly aggrieved and vengeful. The dispute is subsequently fueled by a long-running cycle of retaliatory violence. This continual cycle of provocation and retaliation means that feuds can persist for generations and may result in extreme acts of violence. They can be interpreted as an extreme outgrowth of social relations based in family honor, marriage, or competition over property.

Until the early modern period, feuds were considered legitimate legal instruments and were regulated to some degree. For example, Montenegrin culture calls this krvna osveta, meaning "blood revenge", which had unspoken but highly valued rules. In Albanian culture it is called gjakmarrja and usually lasts for generations. In tribal societies, the blood feud, coupled with the practice of blood wealth, functioned as an effective form of social control for limiting and ending conflicts between individuals and groups who were related by kinship, as described by anthropologist Max Gluckman in his article "The Peace in the Feud" in 1955.

== Blood feuds ==
A blood feud is a feud with a cycle of retaliatory violence, with the relatives or associates of someone who has been killed or otherwise wronged or dishonored seeking vengeance by killing or otherwise physically punishing the culprits or their relatives. In the English-speaking world, the Italian word vendetta is used to mean a blood feud; in Italian, however, it simply means (personal) 'vengeance' or 'revenge', originating from the Latin vindicta (vengeance), while the word faida would be more appropriate for a blood feud. In the English-speaking world, "vendetta" is sometimes extended to mean any other long-standing feud, not necessarily involving bloodshed. Sometimes it is not mutual, but rather refers to a prolonged series of hostile acts waged by one person against another without reciprocation.

The percentages of men killed in war in eight tribal societies. (Lawrence H. Keeley, Archeologist, War Before Civilization)

The blood feud has certain similarities to the ritualized warfare found in many pre-industrial tribes. For instance, more than a third of Ya̧nomamö males, on average, died from warfare. The accounts of missionaries to the area have recounted constant infighting in the tribes for women or prestige, and evidence of continuous warfare for the enslavement of neighboring tribes, such as the Macu, before the arrival of European settlers and government.

=== History ===
Blood feuds were common in societies with a weak rule of law (or where the state did not consider itself responsible for mediating this kind of dispute), where family and kinship ties were the main source of authority. An entire family was considered responsible for the actions of any of its members. Sometimes two separate branches of the same family even came to blows, or further, over some dispute.

The practice has mostly disappeared with more centralized societies where law enforcement and criminal law take responsibility for punishing lawbreakers.

==== Feuds in Antiquity ====
===== Ancient Greece =====
In Homeric ancient Greece, the practice of personal vengeance against wrongdoers was considered natural and customary: "Embedded in the Greek morality of retaliation is the right of vengeance... Feud is a war, just as war is an indefinite series of revenges; and such acts of vengeance are sanctioned by the gods".

===== Hebrew Law =====
In ancient Hebrew law, it was considered the duty of the individual and family to avenge unlawful bloodshed, on behalf of God and on behalf of the deceased. The executor of the law of blood-revenge who personally put the initial killer to death was given a special designation: go'el haddam, the blood-avenger or blood-redeemer (Book of Numbers 35: 19, etc.). Six Cities of Refuge were established to provide protection and due process for any unintentional manslayers. The avenger was forbidden from harming an unintentional killer if the killer took refuge in one of these cities. As the Oxford Companion to the Bible states: "Since life was viewed as sacred (Genesis 9.6), no amount of blood money could be given as recompense for the loss of the life of an innocent person; it had to be "life for life" (Exodus 21.23; Deuteronomy 19.21)".

==== Early Confucianism ====
Confucius had demanded vengeance for the killing of parents, older brothers, and friends, and viewed this as a matter of duty. Book of Rites quotes Confucius saying: "(a son whose parent was killed) should sleep on straw, with his shield for a pillow; he should not take office; he must be determined not to live with the slayer under the same heaven. If he meet with him in the marketplace or the court, he should not have to go back for his weapon, but instantly fight with him."

==== Feuds in the Middle Ages and Renaissance era ====
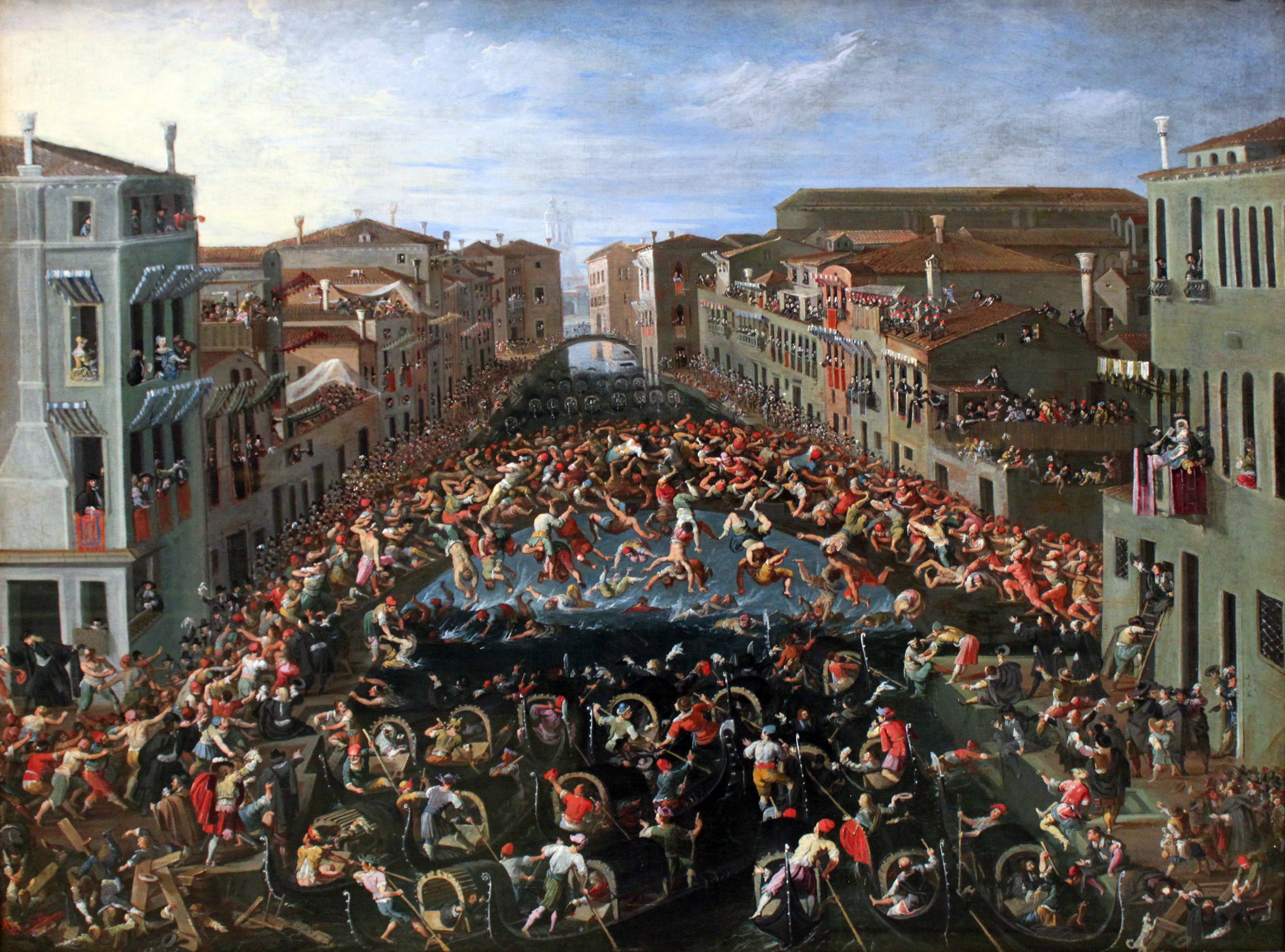
Ponte dei Pugni ('Bridge of Fists') in Venice was used for an annual fist fight competition between the inhabitants of different zones of the city.

===== Medieval Europe in general =====
According to historian Marc Bloch:

The Middle Ages, from beginning to end, and particularly the feudal era, lived under the sign of private vengeance. The onus, of course, lay above all on the wronged individual; vengeance was imposed on him as the most sacred of duties ... The solitary individual, however, could do but little. Moreover, it was most commonly a death that had to be avenged. In this case the family group went into action and the faide (feud) came into being, to use the old Germanic word which spread little by little through the whole of Europe—'the vengeance of the kinsmen which we call faida', as a German canonist expressed it. No moral obligation seemed more sacred than this ... The whole kindred, therefore, placed as a rule under the command of a chieftain, took up arms to punish the murder of one of its members or merely a wrong that he had suffered.

Rita of Cascia, a popular 15th-century Italian saint, was canonized by the Catholic Church due mainly to her great effort to end a feud in which her family was involved and which claimed the life of her husband.

===== Italy =====
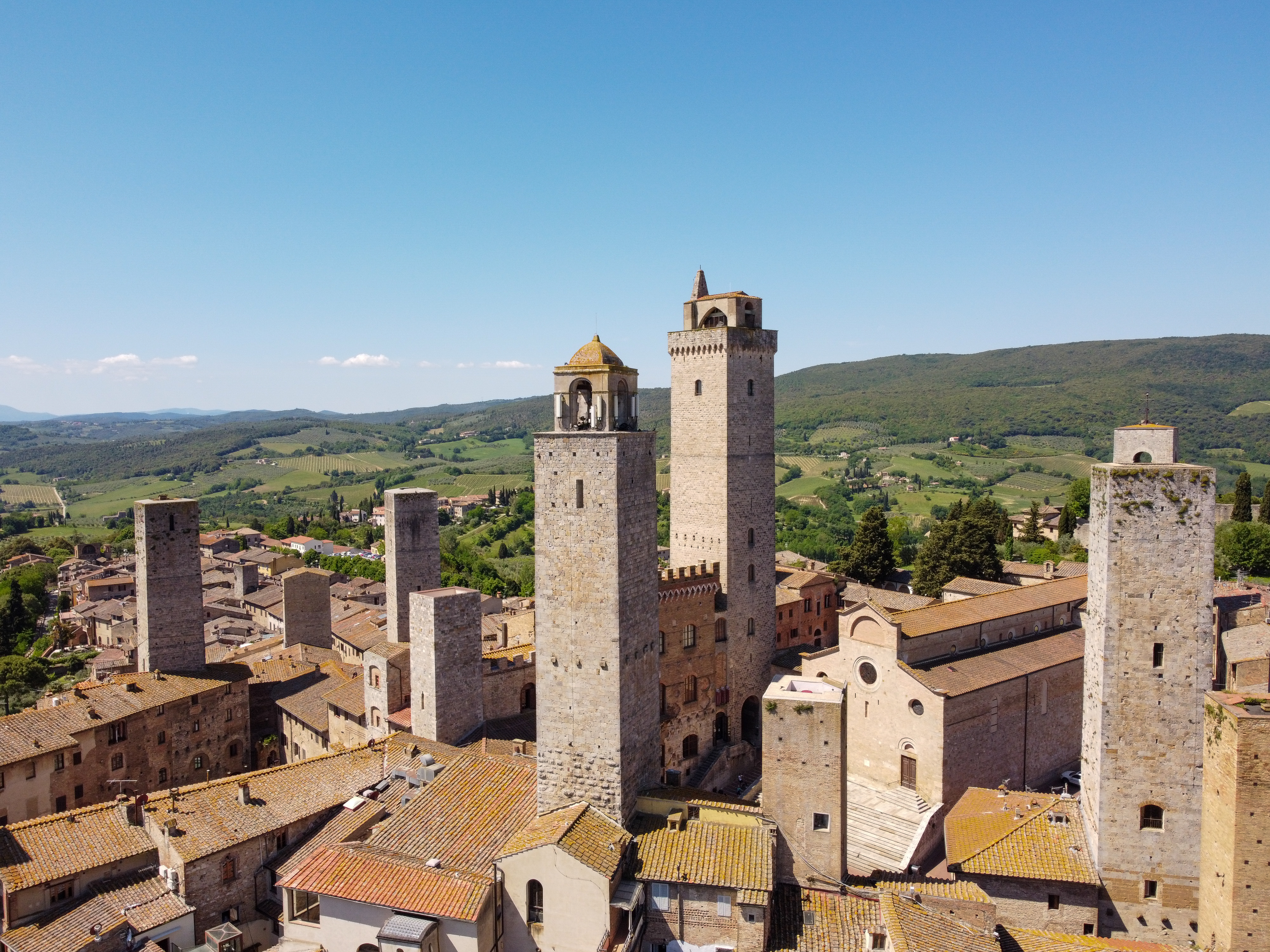
The medieval towers of San Gimignano, built by rival aristocratic families as fortified residences during the era of the Guelphs and Ghibellines.

During the High and Late Middle Ages, much of the Italian peninsula was marked by chronic factional warfare associated with the Guelphs and Ghibellines. What began as a political struggle between the Papacy and the Holy Roman Emperors gradually evolved into a complex network of rivalries that divided noble families, communes, and rival Italian city-states. Entire cities aligned with one faction against their neighbours; for example, Guelph Florence fought repeated wars against the predominantly Ghibelline communes of Siena and Pisa.

Within the cities themselves, these political divisions frequently escalated into long-running feuds between aristocratic families. When one faction gained control, members of the opposing faction were often exiled and sought military support from allied neighbouring cities, perpetuating cycles of violence. Notable examples include the Cerchi and Donati in Florence, the Lambertazzi and Geremei in Bologna, and the Montecchi and Cappelletti traditionally associated with Verona and Cremona. The latter later entered the literary tradition that culminated in Shakespeare's Romeo and Juliet.

===== Northern Europe =====
The Celtic phenomenon of the blood feud demanded "an eye for an eye", and usually descended into murder. Disagreements between clans might last for generations in Scotland and Ireland.

In Scandinavia in the Viking era, feuds were common, as the lack of a central government left dealing with disputes up to the individuals or families involved. Sometimes, these would descend into "blood revenges", and in some cases would devastate whole families. The ravages of the feuds as well as the dissolution of them is a central theme in several of the Icelandic sagas. An alternative to feud was blood money (or weregild in the Norse culture), which demanded a set value to be paid by those responsible for a wrongful permanent disfigurement or death, even if accidental. If these payments were not made, or were refused by the offended party, a blood feud could ensue.

Violence was common in Viking Age Norway. An examination of Norwegian human remains from the Viking Age found that 72% of the examined males and 42% of the examined females had suffered weapon-related trauma. Violence was less common in Viking Age Denmark, where society was more centralized and complex than the clan-based Norwegian society.

In Iceland, blood feuds occurred until the 16th century.

===== Holy Roman Empire =====
Feuds (Fehde) were a legally recognized means of resolving disputes in the Holy Roman Empire throughout much of the Middle Ages. Their prevalence is reflected in the survival of numerous Fehdebücher ("feud books"), official registers recording declarations of feud (Fehdebriefe), maintained by several imperial cities including Nuremberg. Among the most significant were the Soest Feud (1444–1449), fought between the Archbishopric of Cologne and the city of Soest, and the Mainz Diocesan Feud (1461–1463), which arose from a disputed archiepiscopal succession.

At the Holy Roman Empire's Reichstag of Worms in 1495, the Imperial Reform abolished the traditional right to wage private warfare by proclaiming the Ewiger Landfriede ("eternal public peace"). The reform sought to end private feuds and curb the activities of robber barons, while establishing a standing imperial army to enforce the peace. Although implementation was gradual and private feuds continued into the early sixteenth century, imperial authorities increasingly intervened to suppress them. The imperial knight Götz von Berlichingen became one of the best-known participants in such feuds. In 1506, after Prague's town councillors executed the knight Jan Kopidlanský for killing a family rival, his brother Jiří declared a private feud against the city. Another notable example was the Nuremberg–Schott feud, in which Emperor Maximilian I intervened to halt the activities of the robber knight Konrad Schott von Schottenstein.

===== Spain =====
In the Spanish Late Middle Ages, the Basque Country was ravaged by the War of the Bands, which were bitter partisan wars between local ruling families. In the region of Navarre, these conflicts became polarised in a violent struggle between the Agramont and Beaumont parties. In Biscay, the two major warring factions were named Oinaz and Gamboa. (Cf. the Guelphs and Ghibellines in Italy). High defensive structures ("towers") built by local noble families, few of which survive today, were frequently razed by fires, and sometimes by royal decree.

===== Scotland =====
The 1490 Massacre of Monzievaird marked the culmination of a violent blood feud between the Murray and Drummond families. While feuds were common in the Scottish Highlands at the time, the massacre was regarded as particularly notorious and sensational.

===== Switzerland =====
In the territory of present-day Switzerland, the feud (German Fehde) was a customary and broadly legitimate means of pursuing legal claims by force throughout the Middle Ages. Unusually, the right of feud was not confined to the nobility: burghers and peasants of all ranks waged feuds, often over property claims, and those lacking the means would contract knights of the lesser nobility, giving rise to a quasi-mercenary "feud service." Church-sponsored Peaces of God and the territorial peaces (Landfrieden)—of which the early pacts of the Old Swiss Confederacy were variants—gradually restricted feuding, and it was displaced as the cantons built up their territorial sovereignty and a monopoly of legitimate force. Although the Empire's Eternal Peace of 1495 banned the feud outright, the confederate cantons refused to recognize the associated Imperial Chamber Court; the right of blood revenge nonetheless persisted in parts of Switzerland into the 18th century.

==== Samurai honours and feuds ====
In Japan's feudal past, the samurai class upheld the honor of their family, clan, and their lord by katakiuchi (敵討ち), or revenge killings. These killings could also involve the relatives of an offender. While some vendettas were punished by the government, such as that of the Forty-seven Ronin, others were given official permission with specific targets.

=== Feuds in modern times ===
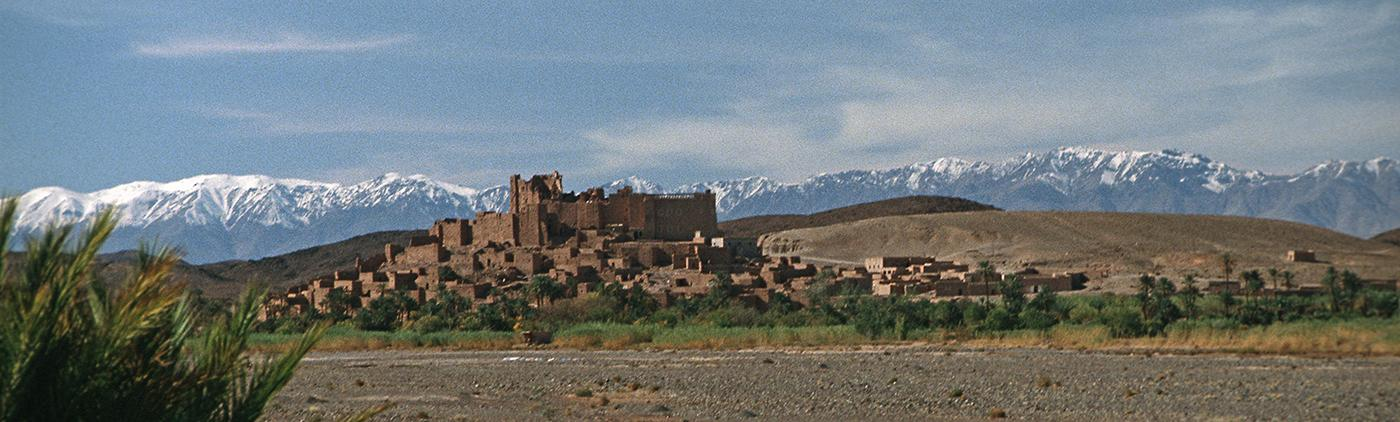
A kasbah in the Dades valley, High Atlas. Historically, tribal feuding and banditry were a way of life for the Berbers of Morocco. As a result, hundreds of ancient kasbahs were built.

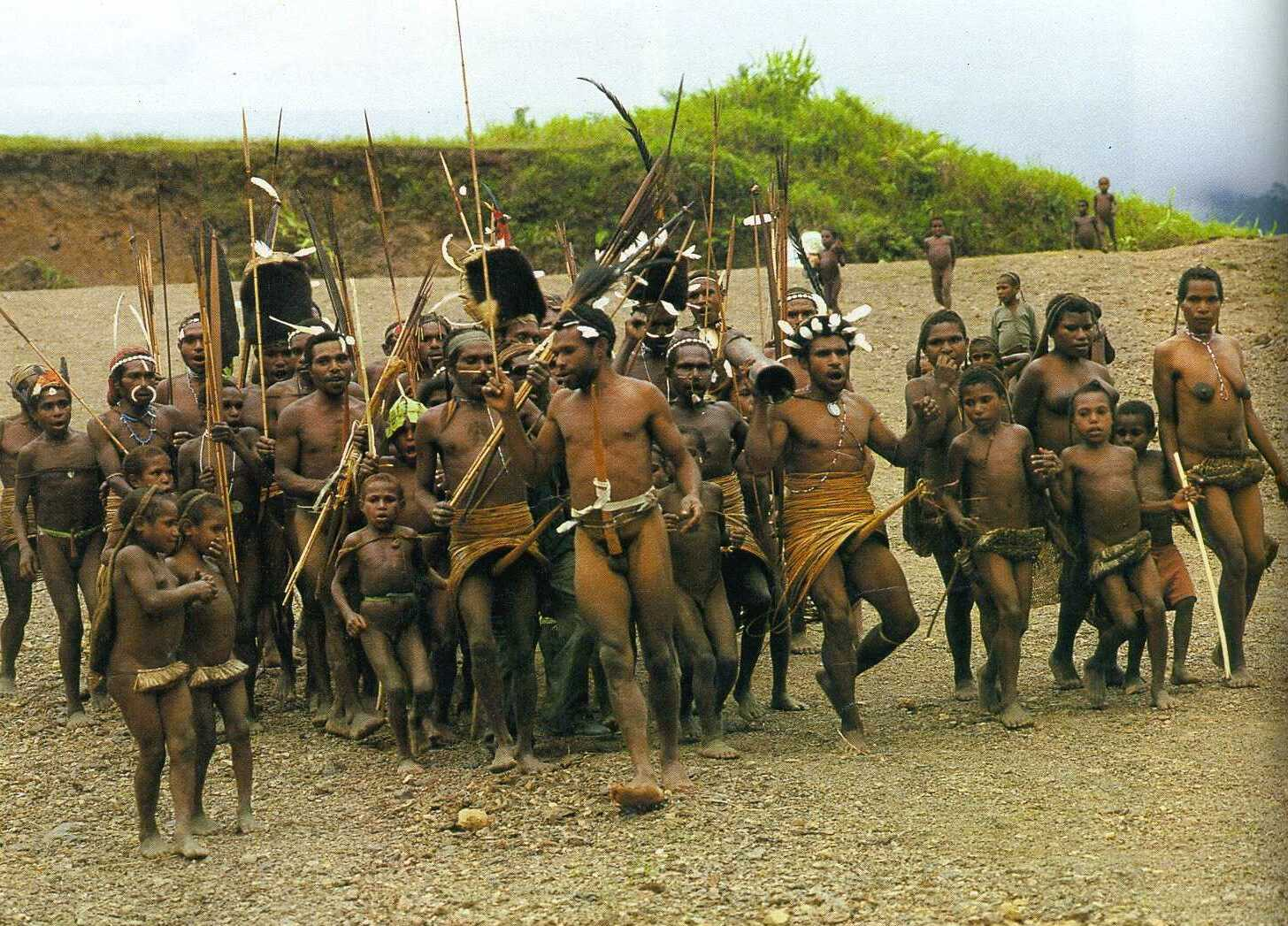
The culture of inter-tribal warfare has long been present in New Guinea.

Blood feuds are still practised in some areas in:

- France (especially Corsica and within Manush communities)
- Sardinia where a blood feud is called in the local language "Disamistade".
- Ireland (especially Dublin and Limerick)
- Between Mafia families in Southern Italy (especially Sicily, Campania, Calabria, Apulia and other areas of the same territory) and neighbouring Malta
- Greece (Mani and Crete)
- Between White British, British Asian or Black British working-class families, crime groups, street gangs, football firms and family clans throughout Britain and Ireland. Feuds amongst Traveller clans are also relatively common throughout Britain and Ireland. Multiple diaspora communities also partake in feuding, such as Turkish, Albanian and Kurdish communities.
- Between rival crime families in Galicia, Spain
- Between so-called woonwagenbewoners (ethnic Dutch people who live in mobile homes) in the Netherlands
- Among Kurdish and Turkish clans in Turkey (as well as between Kurdish clans in Iraq and Iran)
- Between Turkish Cypriots
- Between rival clans in northern Albania and Kosovo
- Between Canadian Aboriginal tribes
- Among Pashtuns in Afghanistan
- Among tribes of Montenegro
- Among Somali clans
- Among the Berbers of Algeria and Morocco
- Egypt (especially among the Saidi people in Upper Egypt)
- Between Yoruba and Igbo clans over land in Nigeria
- Between clans in India and between rival tribes in the north-east Indian state of Assam
- Among Sikh clans in Punjab
- Rayalaseema of Andhra Pradesh in India
- Between Mirpuri clans in Azad Kashmir (as well as between British Pakistanis of Mirpuri descent in England)
- Among rival clans in China, and especially in Fujian and Guangdong provinces
- In the Philippines (especially in Mindanao between Muslim Moro and Christian Cebuano clans)
- Between Burakumin clans in Japan
- In the lawless Wa territories of northern Burma
- Among the Arab Bedouins and other Arab tribes inhabiting the mountains of Yemen
- Between Shiites and Sunnis in Iraq
- Among Palestinian clans in Gaza
- Between Maronite clans, and between Shiites and Sunnis, in Lebanon
- Between Mhallami clans in Lebanon
- Among the Amhara in Ethiopia
- Among the highland tribes of New Guinea
- In Svaneti, in Georgia (especially between Svan clans)
- In the mountainous areas of Dagestan
- Between Kyrgyz and Uzbek clans
- Between Yazidi clans in Armenia and Azerbaijan
- In republics of the northern Caucasus, such as Chechnya and Ingushetia
- Among Chechen teips where those seeking retribution do not accept or respect the local law enforcement authority
- Among the Madurese people in Indonesia (carok)

==== Gang warfare/mob war ====
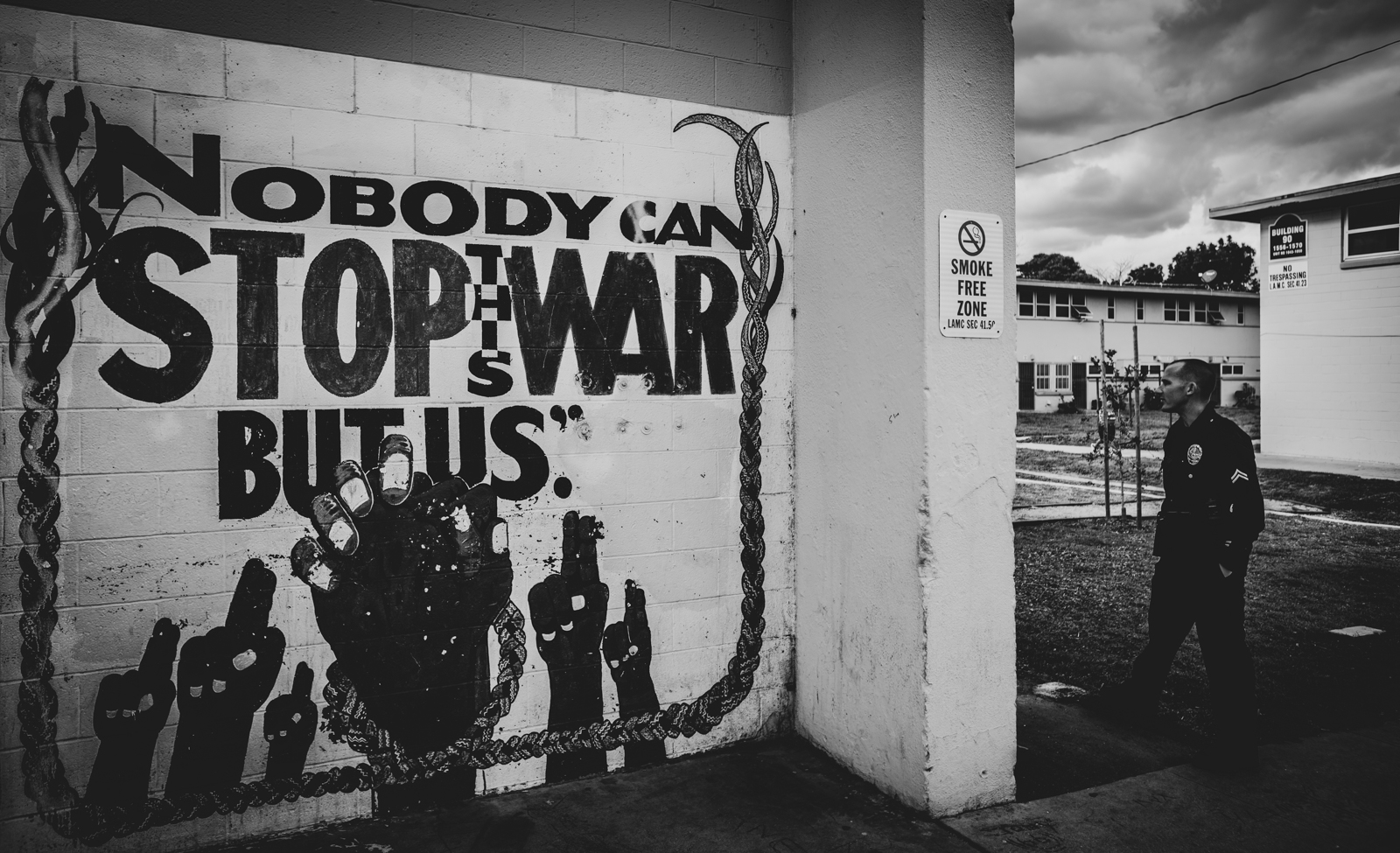
A mural referencing the Crips–Bloods gang war in Watts' Nickerson Gardens housing project, pictured in 2019

During a fight at a carnival celebration in 1991 two young men from the 'Ndrangheta crime organization were killed, leading to a series of feuds between rival clans. Blood feuds within Russian communities do exist (mostly related to criminal gangs), but are neither as common nor as pervasive as they are in the Caucasus. In the United States, gang warfare also often takes the form of blood feuds. A mob war is a time when two or more rival families/gangs begin open warfare with one another, destroying each other's businesses and assassinating family members. Mafia/Mob wars are generally disastrous for all concerned, and can lead to the rise or fall of a family or gang. African-American, Italian-American, Cambodian, Cuban Marielito, Dominican, Guatemalan, Haitian, Hmong, Sino-Vietnamese Hoa, Irish-American, Jamaican, Korean, Laotian, Puerto Rican, Salvadoran and Vietnamese gangs and organized crime conflicts very often have taken the form of blood feuds, in which a family member in the gang is killed and a relative takes revenge by killing the murderer as well as other members of the rival gang. This can also be observed in particular cases in conflicts among Colombian, Mexican, Brazilian, and other Latin American gangs, drug cartels, and paramilitary groups; in turf wars among Cape Coloured gangs in South Africa; in gang fights among Dutch Antillean, Surinamese and Moluccan gangs in the Netherlands; and in criminal feuds between Scottish, White British, Black and Mixed British gangs in the United Kingdom. This has resulted in gun violence and murders in cities like Chicago, Detroit, Los Angeles, Miami, Ciudad Juárez, Medellín, Rio de Janeiro, Cape Town, Amsterdam, London, Liverpool, and Glasgow, to name just a few. The Five Families of New York City New York go to great lengths to avoid a war, as not only do the families lose considerable money and valuable men, gangland killings also cause public outrage and can trigger mass crackdowns from authorities like the FBI.

==== Southern United States ====
Blood feuds also have a long history within the White Southerner population (and in particular among the "Scots-Irish" or Ulster Scots American population) of the Southern United States, where it is called the "culture of honor", and still exists to the present day. A series of prolonged violent engagements in late nineteenth-century Kentucky and West Virginia were referred to commonly as feuds, a tendency that was partly due to the nineteenth-century popularity of William Shakespeare and Sir Walter Scott, both of whom had written semihistorical accounts of blood feuds. These incidents, the most famous of which was the Hatfield–McCoy feud, were regularly featured in the newspapers of the eastern U.S. between the Reconstruction Era and the early twentieth century, and are seen by some as linked to a Southern culture of honor with its roots in the Scots-Irish forebears of the residents of the area. Another prominent example was the Regulator–Moderator War, which took place between rival factions in the Republic of Texas. It is sometimes considered the largest blood feud in American history.

==== Greece ====
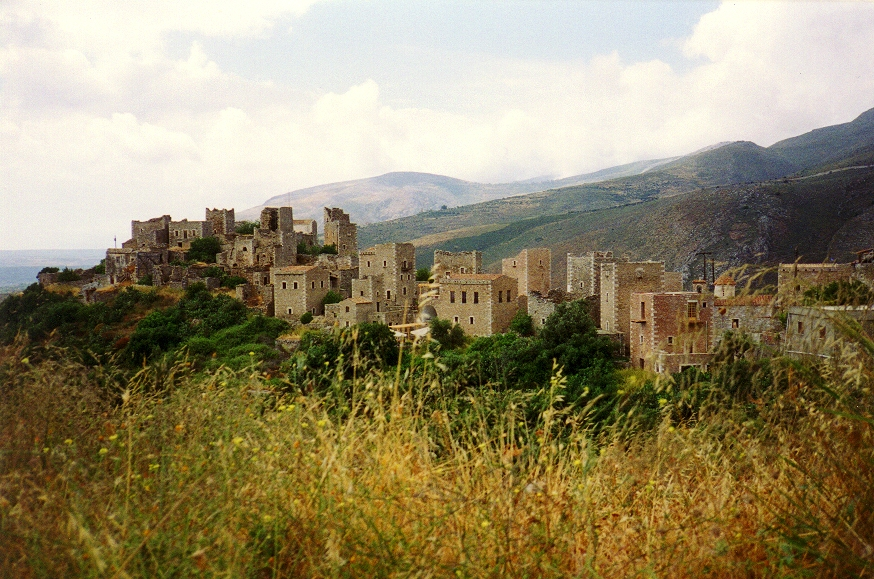
Vatheia, a typical Maniot village famous for its towers

In Greece, the custom of blood feud is found in several parts of the country, for instance in Crete and Mani. Throughout history, the Maniots have been regarded by their neighbors and their enemies as fearless warriors who practice blood feuds, known in the Maniot dialect of Greek as "Γδικιωμός" (Gdikiomos). Many vendettas went on for months, some for years. The families involved would lock themselves in their towers and, when they got the chance, would murder members of the opposing family. The Maniot vendetta is considered the most vicious and ruthless; it has led to entire family lines being wiped out. The last vendetta on record required the Greek Army with artillery support to force it to a stop. Regardless of this, the Maniot Greeks still practice vendettas, even today. Maniots in America, Australia, Canada and Corsica still have on-going vendettas which have led to the creation of mafia families known as "Γδικιωμέοι" (Gdikiomeoi).

==== Corsica ====
In Corsica, vendettas were a social code (mores) that required Corsicans to kill anyone who wronged the family honor. Between 1821 and 1852, no less than 4,300 murders were perpetrated in Corsica.

==== Caucasus ====
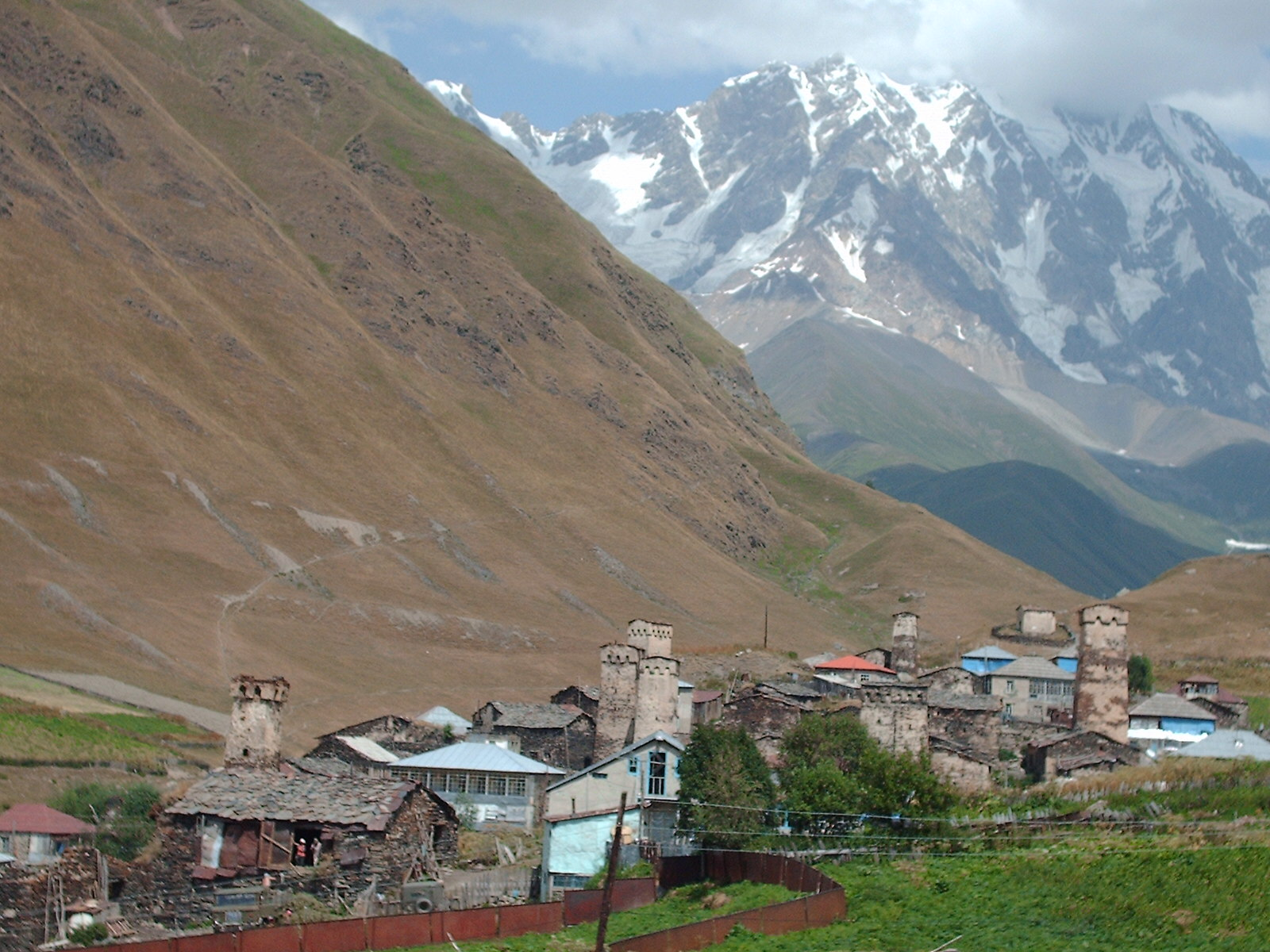
The defensive towers built by feuding clans of Svaneti, in the Caucasus mountains

Leontiy Lyulye, an expert on conditions in the Caucasus, wrote in the mid-19th century: "Among the mountain people the blood feud is not an uncontrollable permanent feeling such as the vendetta is among the Corsicans. It is more like an obligation imposed by the public opinion." In the Dagestani aul of Kadar, one such blood feud between two antagonistic clans lasted for nearly 260 years, from the 17th century until the 1860s.

==== Albania ====
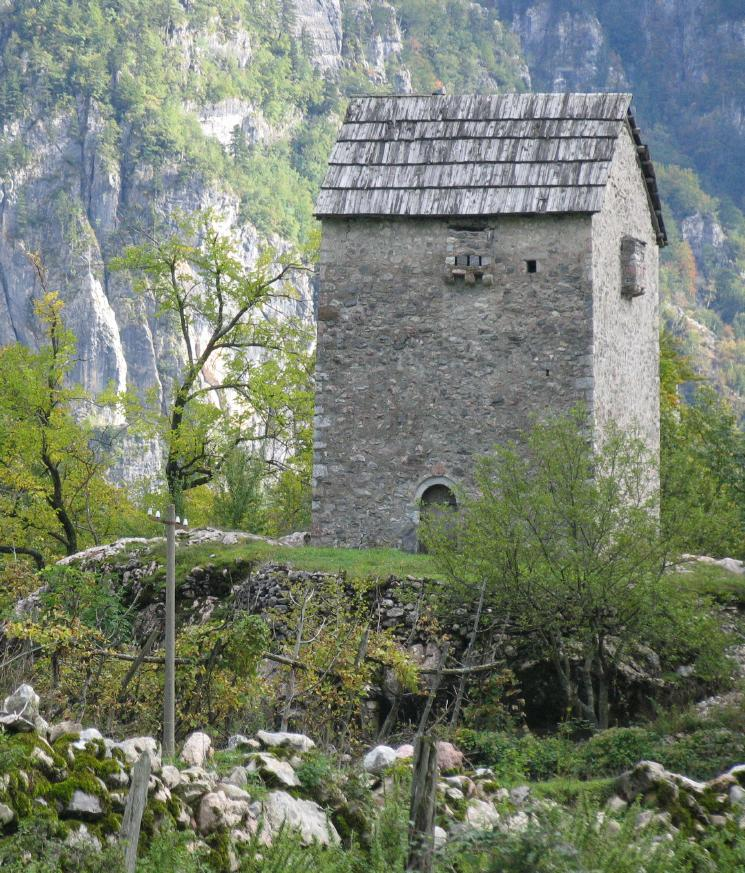
A fortified tower used as refuge for men involved in a blood feud who are vulnerable to attack. Thethi, northern Albania.

In Albania, gjakmarrja (blood feuding) is a tradition. Blood feuds in Albania trace back to the Kanun, this custom is also practiced among the Albanians of Kosovo. It returned to rural areas after more than 40 years of being abolished by Albanian Communists led by Enver Hoxha.

In 1980, Albanian author Ismail Kadare published Broken April, about the centuries-old tradition of hospitality, blood feuds, and revenge killing in the highlands of north Albania in the 1930s. The New York Times, reviewing it, wrote: "Broken April is written with masterly simplicity in a bardic style, as if the author is saying: Sit quietly and let me recite a terrible story about a blood feud and the inevitability of death by gunfire in my country. You know it must happen because that is the way life is lived in these mountains. Insults must be avenged; family honor must be upheld...." The novel was made into a 2001 movie entitled Behind the Sun by filmmaker Walter Salles, set in 1910 Brazil and starring Rodrigo Santoro, which was nominated for a BAFTA Award for Best Film Not in the English Language and a Golden Globe Award for Best Foreign Language Film.

There are now more than 1,600 families who live under an ever-present death sentence because of feuds. and since 1991, some 12,000 people were killed in them.

==== Kosovo ====
Blood feuds have also been part of a centuries-old tradition in Kosovo, tracing back to the Kanun, a 15th-century codification of Albanian customary rules. In the early 1990s, most cases of blood feuds were reconciled in the course of a large-scale reconciliation movement to end blood feuds led by Anton Çetta. The largest reconciliation gathering took place at Verrat e Llukës on 1 May 1990, which had between 100,000 and 500,000 participants. By 1992, the reconciliation campaign ended at least 1,200 deadly blood feuds, and in 1993, not a single homicide occurred in Kosovo.

==== Republic of Ireland ====
Criminal gang feuds also exist in Dublin, Ireland and in the Republic's third-largest city, Limerick. Traveller feuds are also common in towns across the country. Feuds can be due to personal issues, money, or disrespect, and grudges can last generations. Since 2001, over 300 people have been killed in feuds between different drugs gangs, dissident republicans, and Traveller families.

==== Upper Egypt ====
Blood feuds have a long history in Upper Egypt, where they are known as "al-tha'r" (الثأر) and is traditionally associated with family and tribal honor. Such feuds are particularly documented in the southern governorates of Qena, Sohag, Asyut, Aswan, and Minya, where a killing can lead to retaliatory violence against the original perpetrator or another member of his family, sometimes continuing for years or even generations. In rural parts of Upper Egypt, disputes over land, money, personal disagreements, or even minor quarrels can escalate into prolonged cycles of revenge killings. Some of the deadliest incidents have occurred in Qena Governorate, such as the 2010 Nag Hammadi massacre in which seven people were killed at a mourning gathering, it was done to avenge the rape of a 12 year old girl from the Berber tribe of Al-Hawara by a Coptic man in the nearby town of Farshout. Other major incidents include a 2014 10 day clash in Aswan, in which 25 people were killed. Egyptian authorities, religious institutions, and local community leaders have periodically attempted to end such feuds through customary reconciliation meetings, mediation, and compensation agreements, reflecting efforts to replace cycles of retaliation with negotiated settlements.

==== Philippines ====
Family and clan feuds, known locally as rido, are characterized by sporadic outbursts of retaliatory violence between families and kinship groups, as well as between communities. It can occur in areas where the government or a central authority is weak, as well as in areas where there is a perceived lack of justice and security. Rido is a Maranao term commonly used in Mindanao to refer to clan feuds. It is considered one of the major problems in Mindanao because, apart from numerous casualties, rido has caused destruction of property, crippled local economies, and displaced families.

Located in the southern Philippines, Mindanao is home to a majority of the country's Muslim community, and includes the Bangsamoro Autonomous Region in Muslim Mindanao. Mindanao "is a region suffering from poor infrastructure, high poverty, and violence that has claimed the lives of more than 120,000 in the last three decades." There is a widely held stereotype that the violence is perpetrated by armed groups that resort to terrorism to further their political goals, but the actual situation is far more complex. While the Muslim-Christian conflict and the state-rebel conflicts dominate popular perceptions and media attention, a survey commissioned by The Asia Foundation in 2002—and further verified by a recent Social Weather Stations survey—revealed that citizens are more concerned about the prevalence of rido and its negative impact on their communities than the conflict between the state and rebel groups. The unfortunate interaction and subsequent confusion of rido-based violence with secessionism, communist insurgency, banditry, military involvement and other forms of armed violence shows that violence in Mindanao is more complicated than what is commonly believed.

Rido has wider implications for conflict in Mindanao, primarily because it tends to interact in unfortunate ways with separatist conflict and other forms of armed violence. Many armed confrontations in the past involving insurgent groups and the military were triggered by a local rido. The studies cited above investigated the dynamics of rido with the intention of helping design strategic interventions to address such conflicts.

===== Causes =====
The causes of rido are varied and may be further complicated by a society's concept of honor and shame, an integral aspect of the social rules that determine accepted practices in the affected communities. The triggers for conflicts range from petty offenses, such as theft and jesting, to more serious crimes, like homicide. These are further aggravated by land disputes and political rivalries, the most common causes of rido. Proliferation of firearms, lack of law enforcement and credible mediators in conflict-prone areas, and an inefficient justice system further contribute to instances of rido.

===== Statistics =====
Studies on rido have documented a total of 1,266 rido cases between the 1930s and 2005, which have killed over 5,500 people and displaced thousands. The four provinces with the highest numbers of rido incidences are: Lanao del Sur (377), Maguindanao (218), Lanao del Norte (164), and Sulu (145). Incidences in these four provinces account for 71% of the total documented cases. The findings also show a steady rise in rido conflicts in the eleven provinces surveyed from the 1980s to 2004. According to the studies, during 2002–2004, 50% (637 cases) of total rido incidences occurred, equaling about 127 new rido cases per year. Out of the total number of rido cases documented, 64% remain unresolved.

===== Resolution =====
Rido conflicts are either resolved, unresolved, or reoccurring. Although the majority of these cases remain unresolved, there have been many resolutions through different conflict-resolving bodies and mechanisms. These cases can utilize the formal procedures of the Philippine government or the various indigenous systems. Formal methods may involve official courts, local government officials, police, and the military. Indigenous methods to resolve conflicts usually involve elder leaders who use local knowledge, beliefs, and practices, as well as their own personal influence, to help repair and restore damaged relationships. Some cases using this approach involve the payment of blood money to resolve the conflict. Hybrid mechanisms include the collaboration of government, religious, and traditional leaders in resolving conflicts through the formation of collaborative groups. Furthermore, the institutionalization of traditional conflict resolution processes into laws and ordinances has been successful with the hybrid method approach. Other conflict-resolution methods include the establishment of ceasefires and the intervention of youth organizations.

== Well-known blood feuds ==
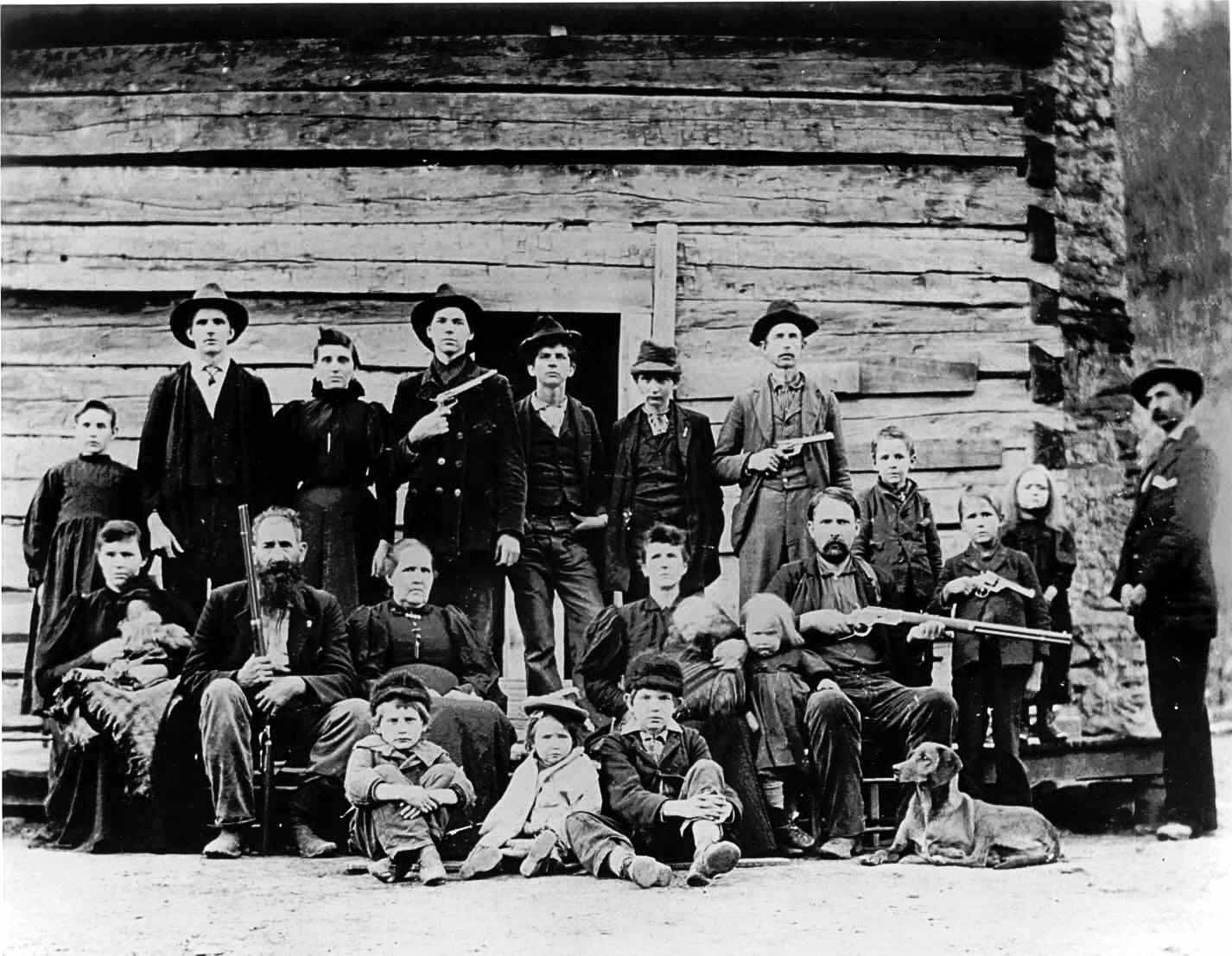
The Hatfield clan in 1897

- Three Kingdoms period, feuding warlords during the fall of the Han dynasty (184–280 AD; China)
- Njál's saga, an Icelandic account of a Norse blood feud (960–1020; Iceland, Ireland and Norway)
- Feud of the Sviatoslavichi (975/977–980) in Kyivan Rus'
- Feud of the Volodimerovichi (1015–1019; Kievan Rus')
- The Mackintosh-Cameron feud (1290s–1665; Scotland)
- The Battle of the North Inch; the battle is fictionalised in the novel The Fair Maid of Perth by Sir Walter Scott (Michaelmas 1396; Scotland)
- The Krummedige-Tre Rosor feud (1448–1502; Norway)
- The Bonville–Courtenay feud (1450s; England)
- The Percy–Neville feud (1450s; England)
- The Wars of the Roses (1455–1487; England)
- The Talbot–Berkeley feud (1455–1485 England; concurrent with the Wars of the Roses)
- The Gunn–Keith feud (1464–1978; Scotland)
- The Campbell–MacDonald feud, including the Massacre of Glencoe (1692; Scotland)
- The Clan Forbes–Clan Gordon feud, (1500s–1571; Scotland)
- The Clan Forbes–Clan Leslie feud, (1520s–1530s; Scotland)
- The Clan Kerr-Clan Scott feud, (1526–1565; Scotland)
- The Clan Forbes–citizens of Aberdeen feud, (1529–1539; Scotland)
- The Regulator-Moderator War, (1839–1844; Republic of Texas)
- The Punti–Hakka Clan Wars, (1855–1868; Guangdong, China)
- The Donnelly–Biddulph community feud (1857–1880; Ontario, Canada)
- The Lincoln County War (1878–1881; New Mexico, United States)
- The Lincoln County Feud (1878–1890; West Virginia, United States)
- The Hatfield-McCoy feud (1878–1891; West Virginia & Kentucky, United States)
- The Clanton/McLaury–Earp feud (see also Earp Vendetta Ride), also known as the "Gunfight at the O.K. Corral" (1881; Arizona, United States)
- The Pleasant Valley War, also known as the "Tonto Basin Feud" (1882–1892; Arizona, United States)
- The Karađorđević–Obrenović feud (1817–1903; Serbia)
- The Capone–Moran feud, including the St. Valentine's Day massacre (1925–1930; Chicago, Illinois, United States)
- The Castellammarese War (1929–1931; New York City, New York United States)
- The Battle of the Sunset Strip (1947–1951; Los Angeles, California United States)
- The First Colombo Family War (1960–1963; New York City, United States)
- The Greco–La Barbera War (1961–1963; Sicily, Italy)
- The Second Colombo Family War (1971–1975; New York City, United States)
- First 'Ndrangheta war (1974–1977; Calabria, Italy)
- Gargano conflict (1978–present; Apulia, Italy)
- The Riccobene War (1982–1984; Philadelphia, Pennsylvania, United States)
- Second 'Ndrangheta war (1985–1991; Calabria, Italy)
- The Internal Patriarca War (1991–1996; Boston, Massachusetts, United States)
- Great Mafia War (1981–1983; Sicily, Italy)
- Battle for Nuevo Laredo (2003–2010; Tamaulipas, Mexico)
- The Feud of Scampia (2004–2005; Naples, Italy)
- The Maguindanao Massacre (2009; Ampatuan, Philippines)
- The Montreal Mafia War (2009–present; mostly the Canadian provinces of Quebec and Ontario)
- The Sinaloa War (2024–present; Sinaloa, Mexico)

== See also ==
- Alastor, Greek daemon of blood feuds and generational guilt
- Bedouin blood feud
- Blood Law
- Dassler brothers feud
- Feud (professional wrestling)
- Gjakmarrja
- Kin punishment
- List of feuds in the United States
- Punti–Hakka Clan Wars
- San Luca feud
- Sippenhaft
