= Nuremberg v. Konrad Schott von Schottenstein =

In 1497, Konrad Schott von Schottenstein was elected Burgrave of Rothenberg. The castle and land had been sought after for a long time by the city of Nuremberg. With Schott as the Burgrave, Nuremberg could only receive the land if they successfully outmaneuvered Schott both politically and, if necessary, militarily. The tension soon began to rise between Schott and Nuremberg over the issues of land and rights. This tension would finally break in 1498, "provoking furore across Germany".

There is some speculation that the margrave of Brandenburg helped Schott and Giech set up the feud with Nuremberg. This comes to mind due to earlier tensions between Brandenburg and Nuremberg and the attack on the city of Nuremberg in 1502, in which Christoph von Giech and many nobles aided Brandenburg's attack. However, there is no direct link between the feud and Brandenburg, and the attack could well be summed up as an attack of opportunity.

== First Blood ==
Before the feud began, there was a battle fought by Schott and Christoph von Giech, a fellow knight and Burgrave of Rothenberg, against retainers of Nuremberg. This battle was extremely unclear, as both sides presented different stories on who was involved, where it happened, and who started it.

Nuremberg claimed that Hans Herzog, a retainer of the city, was stopped by Christoph von Giech and a group of his men. Upon finding out that Herzog was working for the city, Giech and his men cried,"it is the right one, stab him to death! Stab him to death!" and then proceeded to kill Herzog. On the same day, some 24 retainers of the city were ambushed by Konrad Schott and a large group of cavalry just outside the city of Nuremberg. They killed two of the city's men, wounded several others and chased them back into the city. Nuremberg's story had Giech and Schott's attacks as preplanned, with no fault to be had at the city's feet. Nuremberg's account presented Giech and Schott as the instigators of the feud in hopes that the nobles and princes of Germany would aid the city.

Giech and Schott claimed that Nuremberg's story was entirely different from the truth. Giech claimed that he and his men were recruited to serve a prince and were on their way to see him. Near Eschenau, they were attacked by Nuremberg Hetzrüden (meaning a group of staghounds) who were yelling, "stab them to death! It is the right ones" (as cited in Zmora,1997). Giech and his men successfully beat off the attack, and killed several Nuremberg men. No mention was made of Hans Herzog in Giech's letter, which Nuremberg would use to claim that Giech's statement was false. Giech and Schott also made it clear that it was one battle, unlike Nuremberg who claimed it was two separate battles. By having the battle happen in one stage, Schott and Giech would be able to claim that the fighting had not been planned out beforehand by their side and therefore must have been planned by the city.

Both sides attempted to charge the other with starting the feud in order to gather more sympathy from the princes and nobles who had power in the Holy Roman Empire. Neither story matched the events, as Schott's raid and the death of Herzog were not mentioned by Giech, and Nuremberg did not mention an attack on Giech. Each story would rally different parts of the Holy Roman Empire to the factions' standards, causing the significance of the feud to rise.

== After the first clash ==
After the first clash, Nuremberg produced a bounty to put on Giech and Schott's heads. Giech attempted to talk with Nuremberg in order to end the fighting and end the bounty. Nuremberg accepted the fact that Giech was attacked but made the stipulation that both Giech and Schott had to go to the city council and "purge [themselves] of all suspicion under oath".

Giech claimed that "as noblemen this answer seemed to us so arrogant and haughty, that for several reasons it would have been humiliating and disadvantageous for us [to get involved with such a] piece of impudence, to appear before them at their pleasure and to take an oath". Schott and Giech instead attempted to bring the case before the emperor or the electors, which Nuremberg refused to do. Because Nuremberg refused, Giech and Schott were shown to be innocent of Nuremberg's claims and they were able to declare a lawful feud.

== Schott attacks Derrer ==
Schott earned his reputation with Nuremberg when he captured Wilhelm Derrer, who was a city councilor. Schott forced Derrer to lay his hand upon a block and lose his hand or else forfeit his life. Schott claimed the hand so that Derrer would no longer write and thus end his attacks on Schott's character. Schott swung and missed the hand but took out some fingers. After which, Schott tried again with his axe. This time he was successful in severing the offending hand. Schott then gave the hand back to Derrer and said, "carry it home to your masters". Despite the cries against such treatment, Schott and Giech argued it was in response to a manhunt launched by Nuremberg right after the first battle at Eschenau, while Nuremberg claimed that Derrer lost his hand long after the battle.

Due to this brutal mutilation, the city refused to negotiate with Schott and Giech. This forced both sides to look for outside help, such as the emperor, nobles, and knights of the Holy Roman Empire, in order to bring the feud to an end.

== Outside Influence ==
After the brutal mutilation of Derrer and the refusal to come to terms, both Nuremberg and Schott and Giech went searching for outside forces to settle the feud. While Giech proclaimed that Nuremberg had broken the peace, Nuremberg used its influence in the imperial court and had an imperial ban placed upon both Geich and Schott.

Though Nuremberg was successful in placing the ban, the city took it too far by trying to urge all powers in Germany to support the ban and assist with its execution. This put the nobles in a tight position, as it would give too much power to the city. Because of this, a move was made to lift the ban and was successful despite the city's attempt to stop the nobles. After the ban was appealed and the rest of the empire looked away, Schott went back and attacked the villages that were under Nuremberg's protection, which caused Schott's reputation to drop to deeper depths.

== Schott's Raids and the Franconian Knighthood ==
With the repeal of the bans, Schott was able to go back to his old ways and terrorize the city. There were reports of burning and looting of the villages. There was even a report of him using women to convince villagers to come out of their homes, whom he would then reap vengeance upon for the crimes against his character.

With the money and adventure that came from these raids, Schott and Giech gathered a large number of followers, who roamed around the country near the city to block any trade from entering. While these raiders were destroying the countryside, Nuremberg pleaded again for help in things such as safe conduct. However, it was not good enough, as a new faction began to join forces with Schott and Giech: the Franconian Knighthood.

The Franconian Knighthood was attempting to form a political organization and used such feuds to work on policy. In early 1500, the city attempted to use them to support the ban on Schott and force peace. Instead of getting support from the knights, Nuremberg received a demand that they release any nobles held in the city. This caused fear to spread as Nuremberg realized this group of nobles was against them.

In an attempt to balance the scales, Nuremberg tried to bring the case up to other parties and charge the knights with "conspiracy and rebellion". As the city spread word of the knights, it gained the ear of Emperor Maximilian. Emperor Maximilian saw these knights as a rebellion against his own authority and used the statutes of the General Peace of 1495 to prevent any from lending a hand in the feud. This made the knights angry, as they believed that Nuremberg had used its influence in an attempt to destroy the status of the nobles. Despite the demands of the Emperor, the knights took action against Nuremberg causing more death and destruction for the city.

== The Ending of the Feud and Consequences ==
Due to mounting pressure from outside forces, Nuremberg and Schott and Giech came together to create a peace treaty. This treaty was mediated by the bishops of Bamberg and Würzburg, and seemed to have ended things at a status quo. The feud was legally over, the bounty was revoked and the ban lifted. Though neither side truly won, it was clear that Nuremberg had suffered the worst during the feud. The knights' damages to Nuremberg and its villages were not compensated, nor did Derrer receive any aid. While Nuremberg suffered severe damages, Giech and Schott had massed friends and wealth from the successful raids on the city. Schott's wealth would increase to the point that, by 1524, he would be a creditor for Brandenburg for 11,000 gulden. This feud also boosted their power and established their dominance over Rothenberg.

As for lasting effects of the feud, Nuremberg would never forgive or forget what Konrad Schott did. Schott would always be remembered as the most hated nobleman. Poems and songs would be written by the citizens demanding that the wild nobleman be roasted and treated as a beast. Though many other parts of his history would tarnish Schott's name, Nuremberg always remembered this feud as his worst.
