= Organised crime in Colombia =

Figure 1 (Colombia location and political boundaries)

Organised crime in Colombia refers to the activities of various groups of drug cartels, guerilla groups, organised crime syndicates or underworld activities including drug trafficking, contract killing, racketeering and other crimes in Colombia. Colombia has seen the rise and fall of drug empires, crime syndicates and organised guerrilla groups, all of which having contributed to the varying forms of organised crimes having occurred in Colombia.

== Types of organised crimes ==
There are a plethora of gang-related crimes committed within Colombia including but not limited to;

=== Illicit drug trafficking ===
Colombia's illicit drug trade is the largest in the world, approximately half of the global supply of cocaine is produced in Colombia. In 2016, 18 million people used the drug worldwide, consuming hundreds of thousands of tonnes of the cocaine produced annually in the Andean region. Each year there is an excess of 150 tonnes of cocaine seized by Colombia's defence ministry, a small portion of the 1,400 produced annually. The Medellín cartel was said to have combined with the M-19 (a guerrilla movement) in an effort to increase drug-trafficking levels, to a point where they were trafficking 80% of the U.S. cocaine market.

=== Government corruption and white-collar crime ===
Modern times have seen the establishment of corruption deep within political and financial structures in Colombia, with cartels such as the Medellín and Cali directly intervening in government organisations with the assassination of important figures such as; Rodrigo Lara (minister of justice), Jaime Pardo Leal (a former presidential candidate), and Antonio Roldan Betancur (former governor of Antioquia). Alternatively, large donations and bribes given to political officials and police officers has led to the turning of a 'blind eye' to specific organised criminal activities. For example, the Cali cartel were responsible for the donation of US$6 Million towards Ernesto Samper Pizano's presidential election, in an attempt to boost his chances of a campaign victory.

=== Kidnapping / robberies / violence ===
Kidnapping is one of the most prominent forms of crimes committed, where gangs and guerrilla groups kidnap or rob rich businessmen or tourists for their perceived wealth. There has been a 90% reduction in kidnappings from 2002 to 2016 according to 2019 OSAC statistics, largely due to government intervention. Modern approaches to kidnappings and robberies have ensued following crackdown on street and gang crime, with the usage of 'Express Kidnappings,' or paseo millionario lasting not over 48 hours where a single person is forced to withdraw all possible funds out of ATM's and forfeit any valuables either on their person or from their own private dwelling. It is not uncommon for kidnappings to end violently with grievous harm inflicted upon the victim, with the city of Cali (previous home of the Cali drug-cartel) boasting a homicide rate of 51 per 100,000 people (2017).

== Medellín Cartel ==
The Medellín Cartel is perhaps the most infamous of all cartels throughout history, its leader Pablo Emilio Escobar Gaviria, better known as Pablo Escobar 'The King of Cocaine,' is arguably the most notorious narco-terrorist / drug lord of all time. His estimated networth sitting at around US$30 Billion at the time of his death (1993). The Medellin cartel was formed following the kidnapping of Martha Nieves Ochoa Vasquez in 1981, by a collective of wealthy companies, cattle ranchers and former members of the Medellín cartel. It was named 'Muerte a Secuestradores (MAS),' meaning death to kidnappers' in English. Its original intentions were to fight the M-19 and provide protection for high-profile economic figures. The Medellín cartel allegedly went on to combine forces with the M-19 movement and use it as its own private paramilitary force. The Medellín cartel in their peak was supplying an estimated 80-90% of the US cocaine market, turning over US$100 million in profits per day. The Medellín cartel differed to smaller cartels, as it was extremely organised and vastly influential within its varied socio-economic spheres, corrupting Colombia over a course of almost 20 years. Their leader Pablo, was highly influential within the group, responsible for bribing police and paying off politicians to work in their favour. The Medellín cartel was responsible for the murders of some 4000 people, including 1000 police officers / journalists, 200 judges and government officials, and even the likes of presidential candidate Luis Carlos Galán.

== Cali Cartel ==
The Cali Cartel was once estimated as being the biggest cartel in Colombia controlling 90% of the global cocaine market, with connections in all 7 continents. They were especially notorious for their utilisation and infiltration of government and political structures, with complete surveillance covering the city of Santiago de Cali. Their spy networks permeated the Colombian state and overseas structures, with their coverage being compared to the 'Soviet KGB' by the US Drug Enforcement Administration (DEA).

== Guerrilla/paramilitary groups ==
=== FARC ===
FARC-EP Flag and Coat of arms (Figure 2)

The Fuerzas Armadas Revolucionarias de Colombia (FARC) movement is the oldest and most prominent terrorist - guerrilla movement in Colombia, originating from the Liberal guerrilla bands of 'La Violencia.' 'La Violencia being the period of civil war between the Liberal and Conservative parties of Colombia from 1948 until 1958. FARC's leaders turned from Liberalism to communist ideals, with 1964 seeing the FARC–EP established as the military wing of the Colombian Communist Party. FARC was initially funded by its more unconventional terrorist activities, such as kidnappings, random and/ or socio-political violence, then later turned to the illicit drug trade for means of funding the scope of its operations. Experts have estimated FARC revenues from the illicit drug trade being around $500- US$600 Million per year. Approximately 65 of the 110 operational FARC units are involved in the illicit drug trade. It is said that the FARC group was responsible for supplying 50% of the worlds Cocaine production. The UN have held the leftist-guerrilla forces of Colombia (FARC and ELN) responsible for 12% of all killings occurring during the Colombian conflict.

=== ELN ===
ELN flag (Figure 3)

The Ejército de Liberación Nacional (ELN) was formed in 1965 and remains active today. It is a left-wing political guerrilla group, formed by a collective of students, intellectuals and Catholic radicals. The ELN was originally more politically oriented than its FARC counterpart, with its absence within the illegal drug trade founded upon its ideological boundaries. In the height of its power in the 1990s the ELN had committed hundreds of kidnappings, an array of car bombings, and had 'hit' many infrastructure projects such as oil pipelines. One of its more notable attacks was the 2019 car bombing of the 'General Francisco de Paula Santander Police Academy,' killing a total of 21 people, injuring 68, and derailing peace talks in Cuba. The group claimed the bombing was a result of the government of President Ivan Duque failing to respect a unilateral ceasefire declared by the rebel forces over Christmas, by bombing ELN camps.

=== AUC ===
AUC flag (figure 4)

The United Self Defense Forces of Colombia (AUC), is a paramilitary organisation operating from 1997 to 2006. It was formed by anti-guerrilla groups and defectors of the Medellín drug cartel. The leaders of the AUC were the Castaño brothers (Fidel, Carlos and Vicente) also known as the 'Los Pepes,' all of which had previously been leading death squads since the early 1980s, and were past members, now enemies of the Medellín cartel. The AUC had a following 30,000 members strong in the height of its reign, and was backed by affluent businessmen and landowners. The AUC was well known for its extensive involvement in the drug trafficking trade with 70% of its funding originating from it, and its numerous human rights violations. In 2001 the group was labelled a terrorist organisation by the United States and the European Union, leading to the eventual demobilisation of its forces.

=== M-19 ===
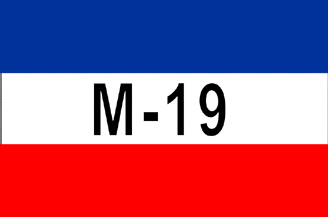
M-19 flag (figure 5)

The 19th of April Movement (M-19) was formed in 1974, following the loss of a populist ex-president (Gustavo Rojas) favoured by the rebels within a fraudulent election. The number of rebels present within the M-19 ranks reached 8000 in its peak and declined slowly after its integration into politics. Perhaps most significant feat of the M-19 was on the 6th of November 1985, when the M-19 seized the Palace of Justice in Bogota. There they took an abundance of hostages, including 25 supreme court Judges. The event turned into a bloodbath, with all of the M-19 Guerrillas deaths along with 12 of the 25 supreme court judges. However, later on the 'M-19' movement went on to become one of the largest and most respected guerrilla movements in Colombia, becoming a legitimate political party following a deal with the Colombian Government in the late 1980s.

== Geography ==
The tropical, equatorial climate of Colombia allows for the efficient production and cultivation of crop such as bananas, rice, corn, sugarcane, cannabis and coca plant, coca plant alone covering an expanse of 25,000 hectares. The typical sub-minimum wages farmers have historically received has led to the formation of coca plantations, due to its lucrative nature and pressures from criminal syndicates. To combat the production of coca plant, the United Nations signed a US$300 Million subsidy (around $300 per month) to not grow coca. The intense foliage coverage has laid host to various nefarious criminal activities, with many criminal syndicates locating their bases of operations deep in forest areas, devoid of outsider surveillance.

The close proximity of Colombia to the Amazon rain forest and the Caribbean sea has paved the way for smuggling routes to neighbouring countries such as Venezuela and Ecuador, and further the North Americas'. The intense foliage of the amazon has assisted with Cartel and guerrilla transportation of contraband, and the vast ocean access to northern American ports has allowed for a multitude of bootleg goods to go by unnoticed.

== History ==
=== 1970s ===
- Saw poor farmers introduce cannabis crops to their farming methods, as it provided a far greater return to their regular produce.
- Cocaine paste smuggled in from Peru and Bolivia provided the starting roots for the illicit drug trade in Colombia.
- "Drug craze" of the United States saw opportunity for criminal groups to make a lucrative living, producing and smuggling drugs.

=== 1980s ===
- The emergence of the first major drug cartels; that of the Medellín and the Cali
- Colombia's many guerrilla groups shifting to criminal activities, such as kidnappings and robberies as a means to finance their ventures. Guerrilla groups include; the Popular Liberation Army (Ejército Popular de Liberación or EPL), The National Liberation Army (Ejército de Liberación Nacional or ELN), The 19th of April Movement (M-19), and the Revolutionary Armed Forces of Colombia (Fuerzas Armadas Revolucionarias de Colombia or simply FARC).
- Cocaine production shifted to Colombia
- 1982 new U.S. - Colombia 'Extradition treaty' mandated the extradition of trans-national narcotics traffickers to the U.S. for trial for crimes
- Medellín cartel blows up Avianca flight 203, in an attempt to assassinate Cesar Gaviria Trujillo (a presidential candidate) killing 107 people.

=== 1990s ===
- 1993 Medellín cartel collapse
- 1995 Cali cartel fall

=== 2000s ===
- A new generation dubbed "The Invisibles" takes over cocaine production and distribution. These "Invisibles" are often successful businessmen operating large businesses/organisations, utilising their legitimate product as a facade for their underlying drug production and distribution.

=== 2020s ===
- In 2025, a money laundering partnership between the Russian mafia and Colombian mafia was detected in Spain.

== See also ==
- Crime in Colombia
