= Ponte dei Pugni =

Bridge in Venice, Italy

Coordinates: 45.4331°N 12.3243°E

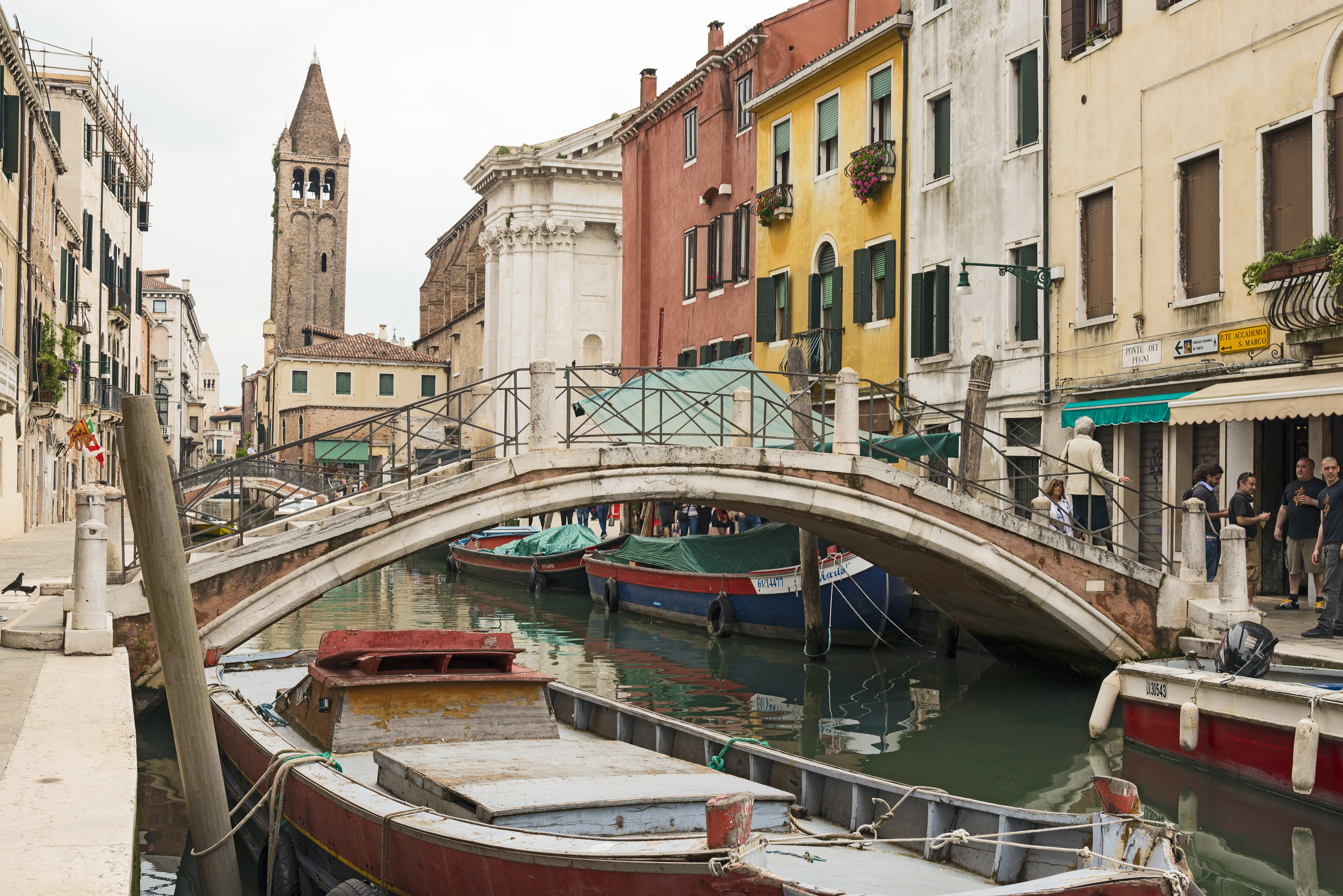
Ponte dei Pugni

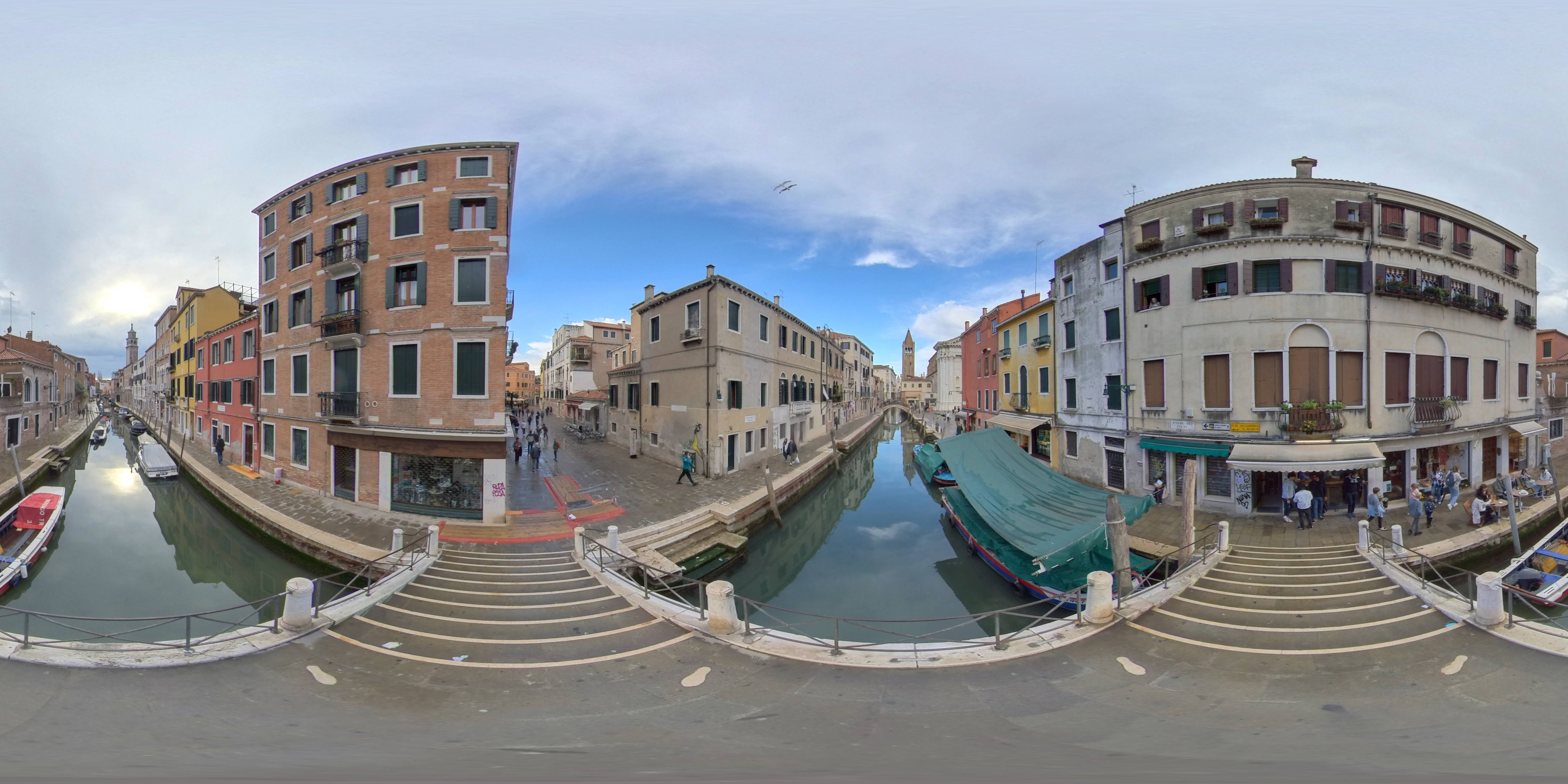
Ponte dei Pugni from above. (view as a 360° interactive panorama)

Ponte dei Pugni ("Bridge of Fists") is a bridge in Venice, Italy and considered one of the most famous "fighting bridges" in the city located near Campo San Barnaba in Dorsoduro.

The top of the bridge has the impression of four footprints, marking the starting position of the fighters when rival clans would gather to fight and throw each other in to the canal. The rivalry between the Nicolotti and the Castellani clans at the bridge dates back to the 14th century. The tradition was ended in the early 18th century after a 1705 altercation led to a "bloodbath" with knives and stones.

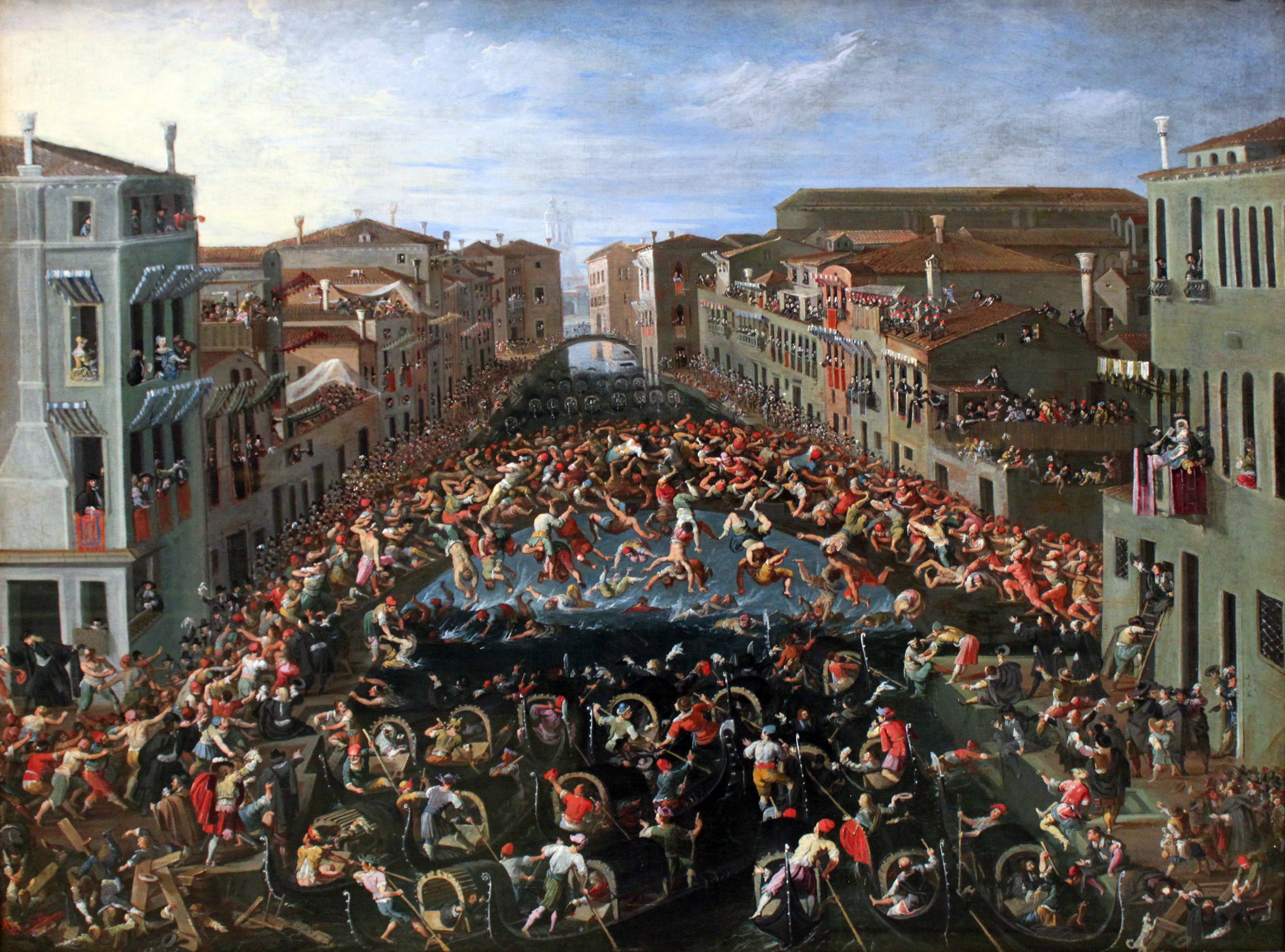
Competition on the Ponte dei Pugni in Venice by Joseph Heintz the Younger (1673).

One of the paintings of Joseph Heintz the Younger (Contest on the Fists Bridge in Venice by Joseph Hines, Jr., 1673) depicts the popular fun in Venice – battagliole sui ponti (battle on the bridge) – an annual competition between the inhabitants of the eastern and western sestiere.
