= Archbishopric of Cologne =

Archbishopric of Cologne may refer to:

- Roman Catholic Archdiocese of Cologne, the spiritual jurisdiction of the archbishops of Cologne since c. 794
- Electorate of Cologne, the temporal jurisdiction of the archbishops of Cologne between the mid-13th century and 1801

== See also ==
- Archbishop of Cologne
