= Tirana =

Capital city of Albania

Tirana Tirona
- Capital city and municipality
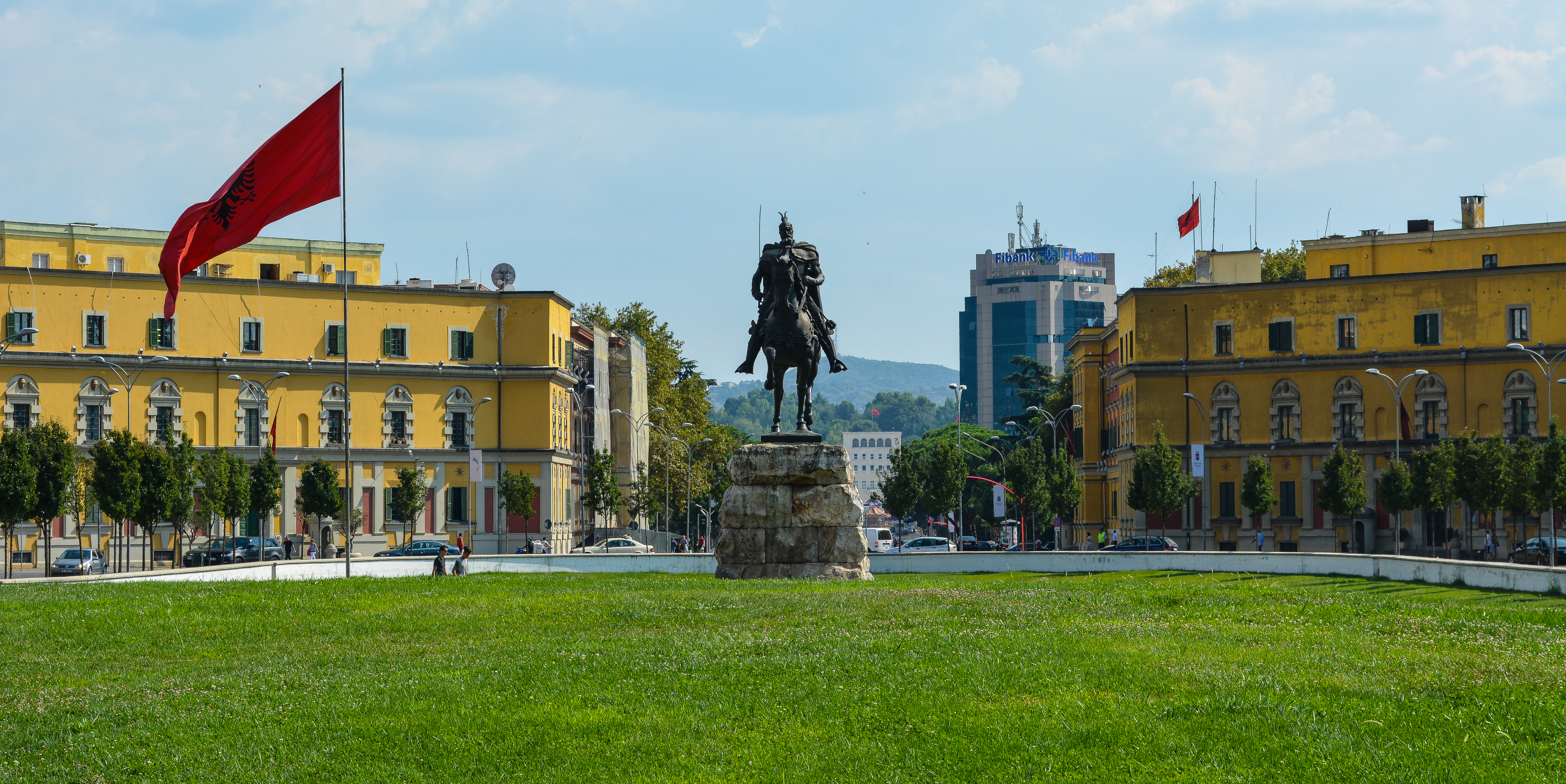
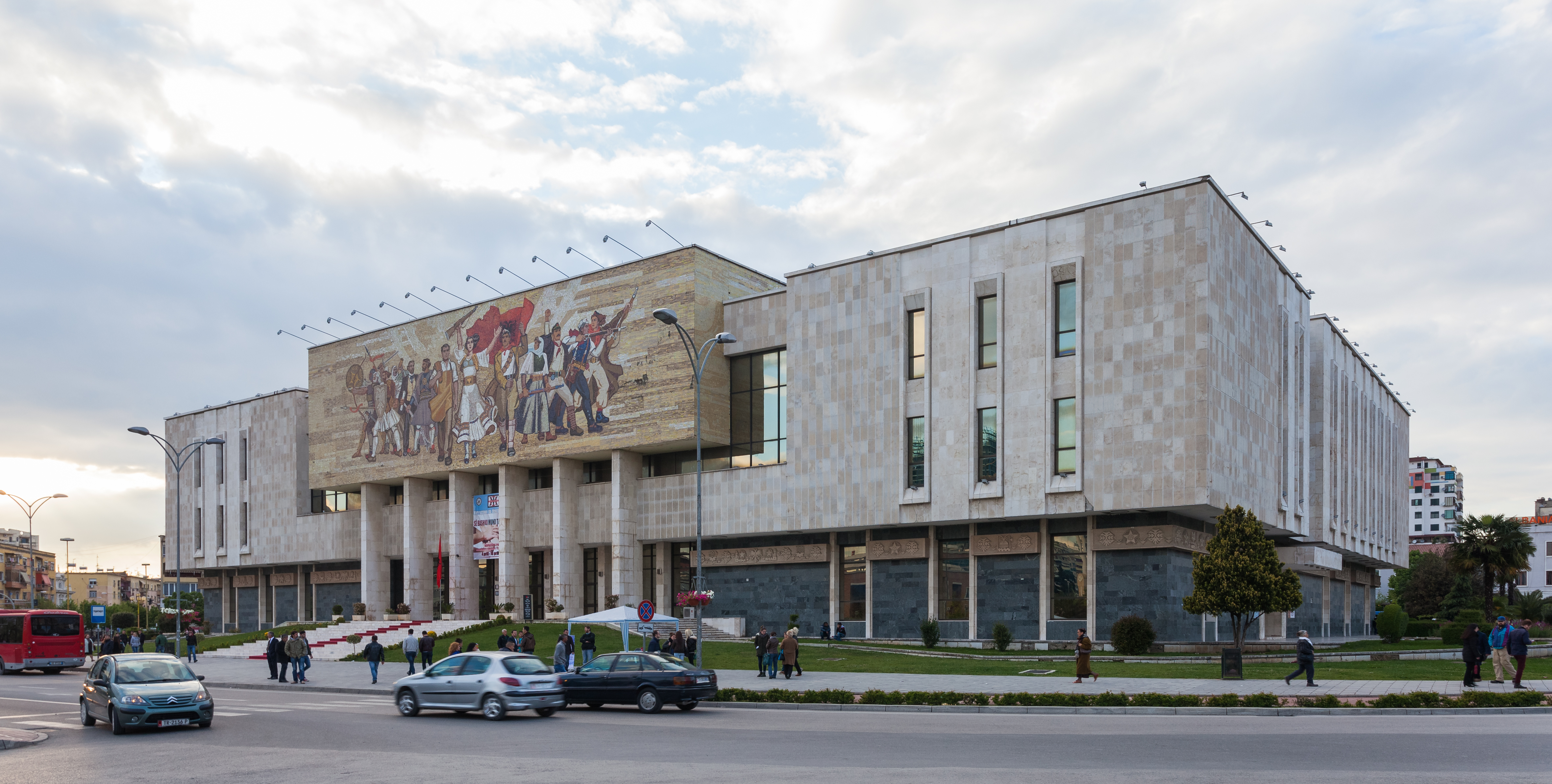
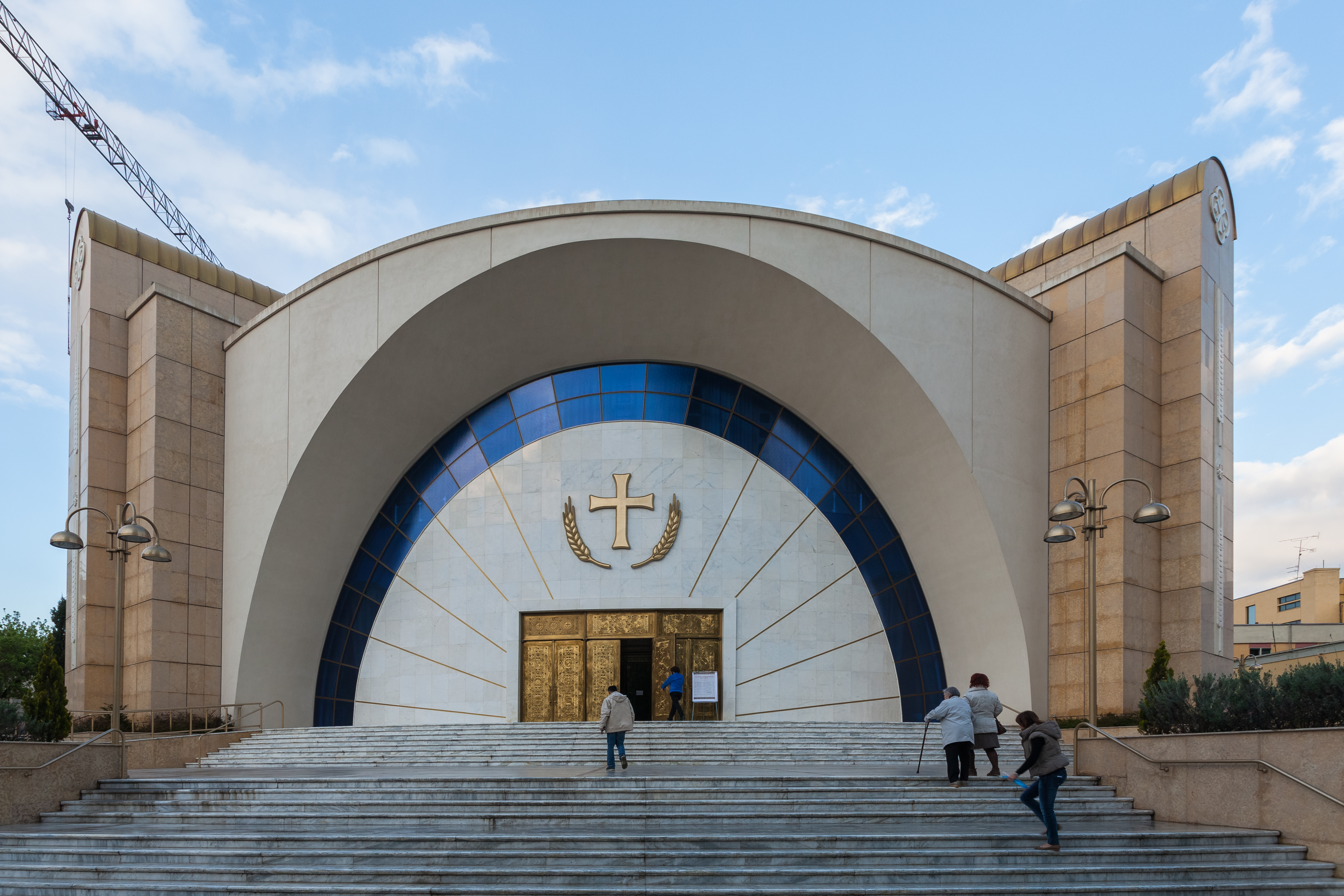
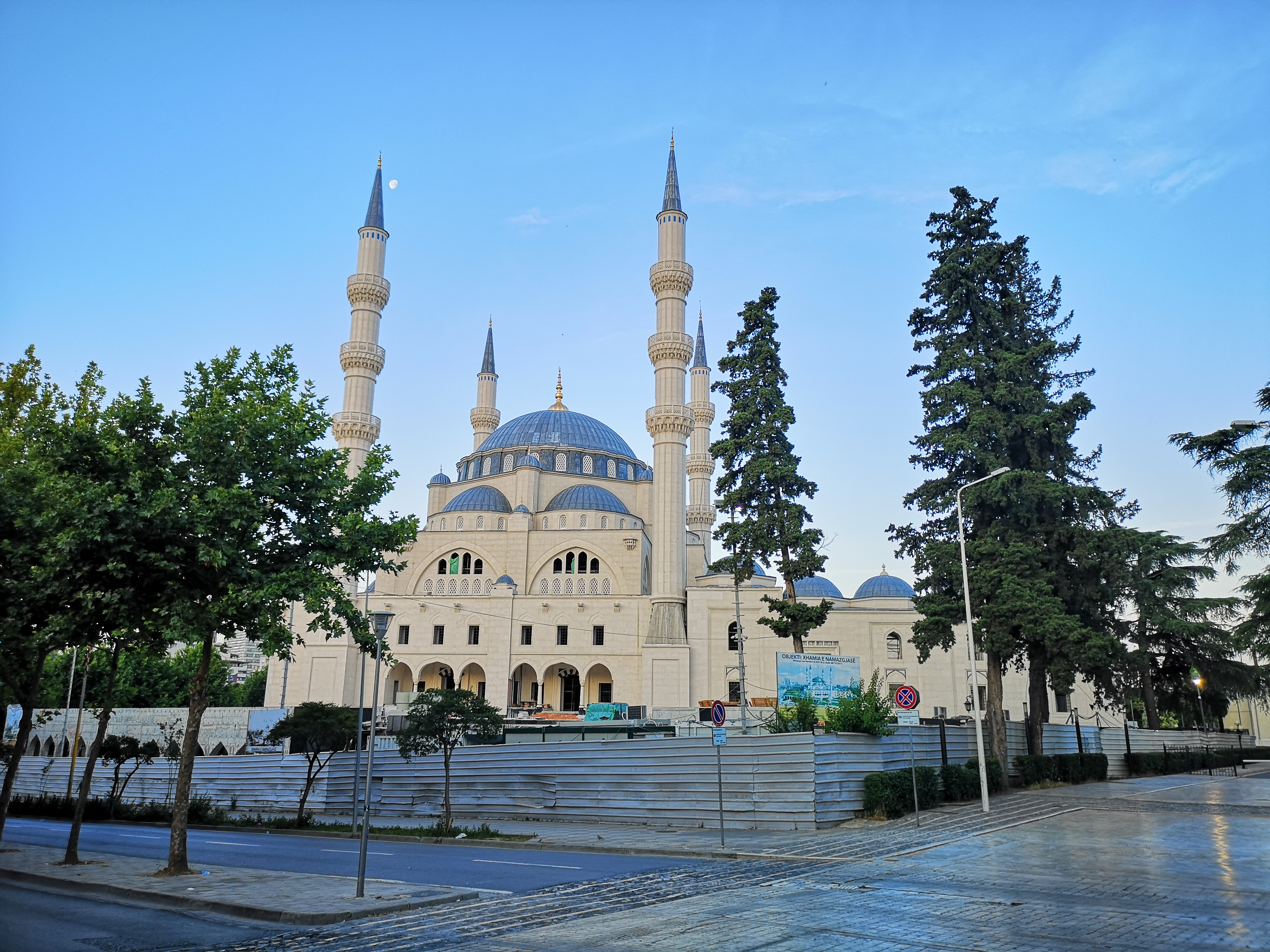
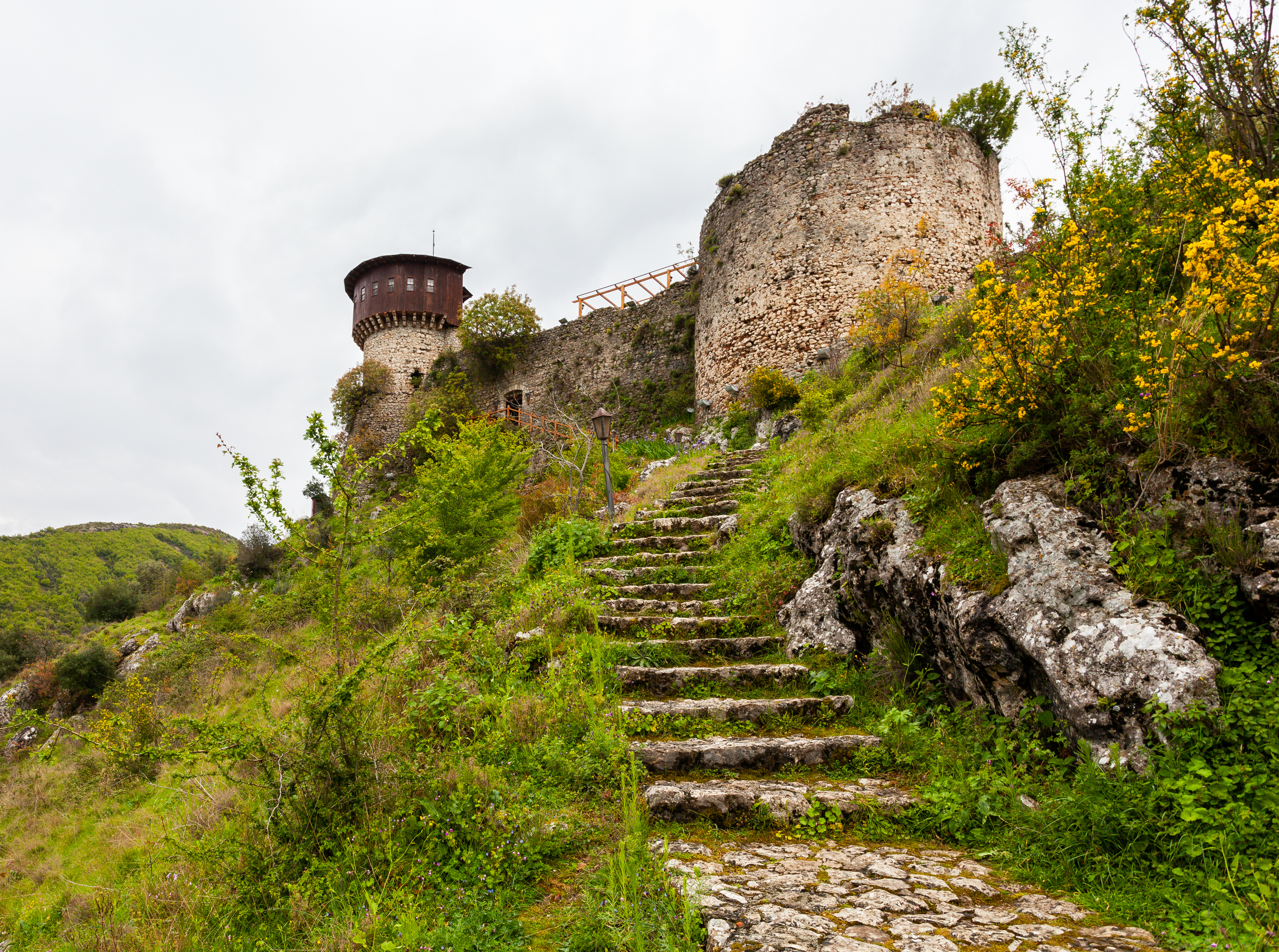
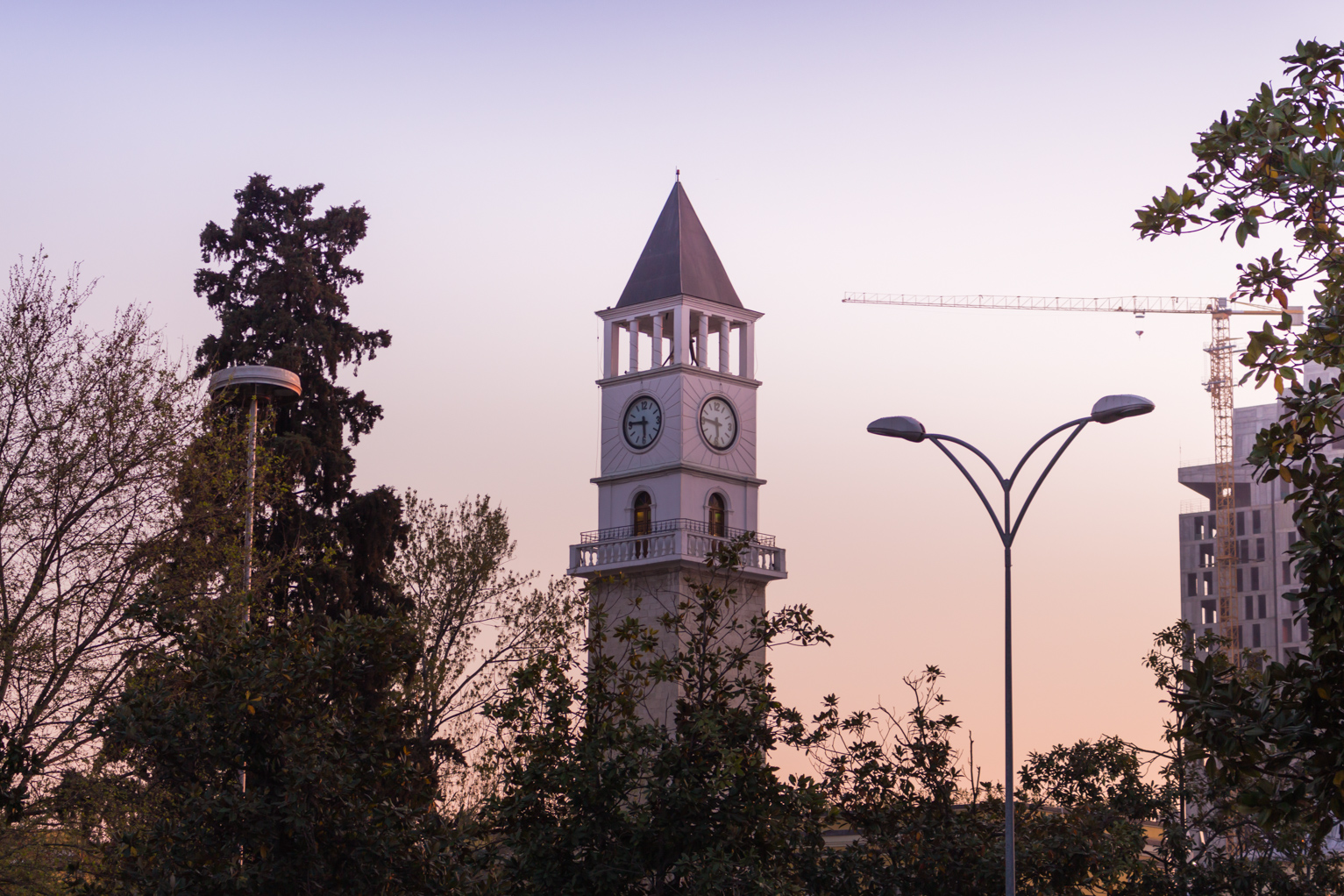
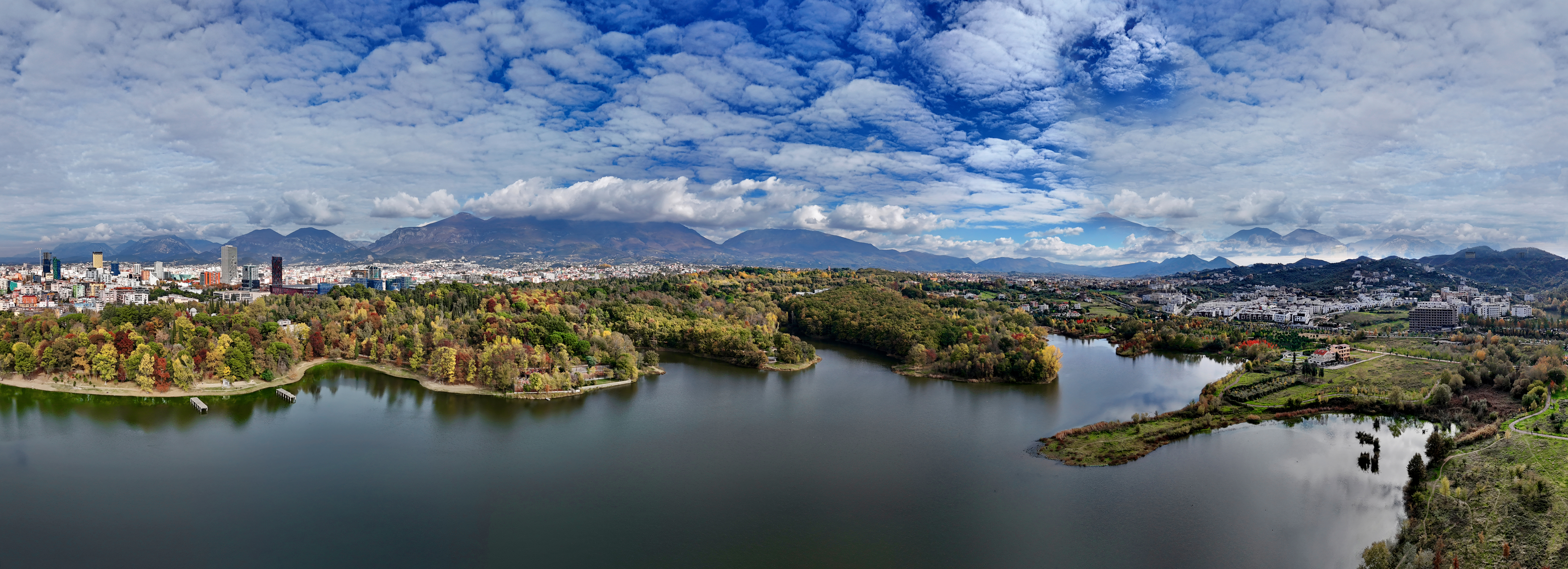
- Skanderbeg Square National History Museum Pyramid of Tirana Resurrection Orthodox Cathedral Namazgah Mosque Petrelë Castle Clock Tower Grand Park of Tirana

- Flag Coat of arms
- Interactive map of Tirana
- Location within Albania Location within Balkans Location within Europe
- Coordinates: 41°19′42″N 19°49′5″E
- Country: Albania
- Region: Central Albania
- County: Tirana
- Municipality: Tirana
- Settled: 1614

Government
  - Type: Mayor–council
  - Mayor: Erion Veliaj (Note: Anuela Ristani served as acting mayor while Veliaj's mayoral powers and duties were suspended by the government from 10 February 2025 to 3 November 2025 due to his arrest, but the Constitutional Court later reinstated him as mayor.) (PS)
  - Council: Tirana Municipal Council
  - Chairwoman: Romina Kuko

Area
  - Municipality: 1,110 km^{2} (430 sq mi)
  - Unit: 41.8 km^{2} (16.1 sq mi)
- Elevation: 110 m (360 ft)

Population
  - Rank: 1st
  - Urban: 526,017
  - Metro: 800,986
  - Municipality: 598,176 (Note: The municipality of Tirana consists of the administrative units of Baldushk, Bërzhitë, Dajt, Farkë, Kashar, Krrabë, Ndroq, Petrelë, Pezë, Shëngjergj, Vaqarr, Zall-Bastar, Zall-Herr and Tirana. The population of the municipality results from the sum of the listed administrative units in the former as of the 2023 Albanian census.)
  - Municipality density: 538/km^{2} (1,390/sq mi)
  - Unit: 389,323
  - Unit density: 9,313/km^{2} (24,120/sq mi)
- Demonym(s): Albanian: Tiranas (m), Tiranase (f); Tirana dialect: Tirons (m), Tironse (f)

GDP (Nominal, 2023)
  - Municipality: lek 1.04 trillion (US$10.02 billion)
  - Per capita: lek 1.37 million (US$13,205.18)
- Time zone: UTC+1 (CET)
  - Summer (DST): UTC+2 (CEST)
- Postal code(s): 1000-1054
- Area code(s): +355 (0) 4
- Airport: Nënë Tereza Airport
- Vehicle registration: TR
- Website: tirana.al

Tirana (Note: Albanian indefinite form: Tiranë (pronounced [tiˈɾanə])) (/tɪˈrɑːnə/ tih-RAH-nə; Albanian pronunciation: [tiˈɾana]; Gheg Albanian: Tirona (Note: Gheg Albanian indefinite form: Tironë)) is the capital and largest city of Albania. It is located in the centre of the country, enclosed by mountains and hills, with Dajti rising to the east and a slight valley to the northwest overlooking the Adriatic Sea in the distance. It is among the wettest and sunniest cities in Europe, with 2,544 hours of sun per year.

Tirana was founded in 1614 by Ottoman Albanian nobleman Sylejman Pasha Bargjini, centered on the Old Mosque and türbe. The site of present-day Tirana has been continuously inhabited since the Iron Age and was likely the core of the Illyrian kingdom of the Taulantii, which in classical antiquity was centred in the hinterland of Epidamnus. Following the Illyrian Wars, it was annexed by the Roman Empire. With the collapse of the Western Roman Empire in the fourth century, most of Albania came under the control of the Eastern Roman Empire. The city was fairly unimportant until the 20th century, when the Congress of Lushnjë proclaimed it as Albania's capital after the Albanian Declaration of Independence in 1912.

Classified as a gamma-world-city, Tirana is the most important economic, financial, political, and trade centre in Albania due to its significant location in the centre of the country. As the seat of power of the Government of Albania, it hosts the official residences of the President and Prime Minister of Albania and the Parliament of Albania. The city was announced as the European Youth Capital for 2022.

== History ==
=== Early development ===
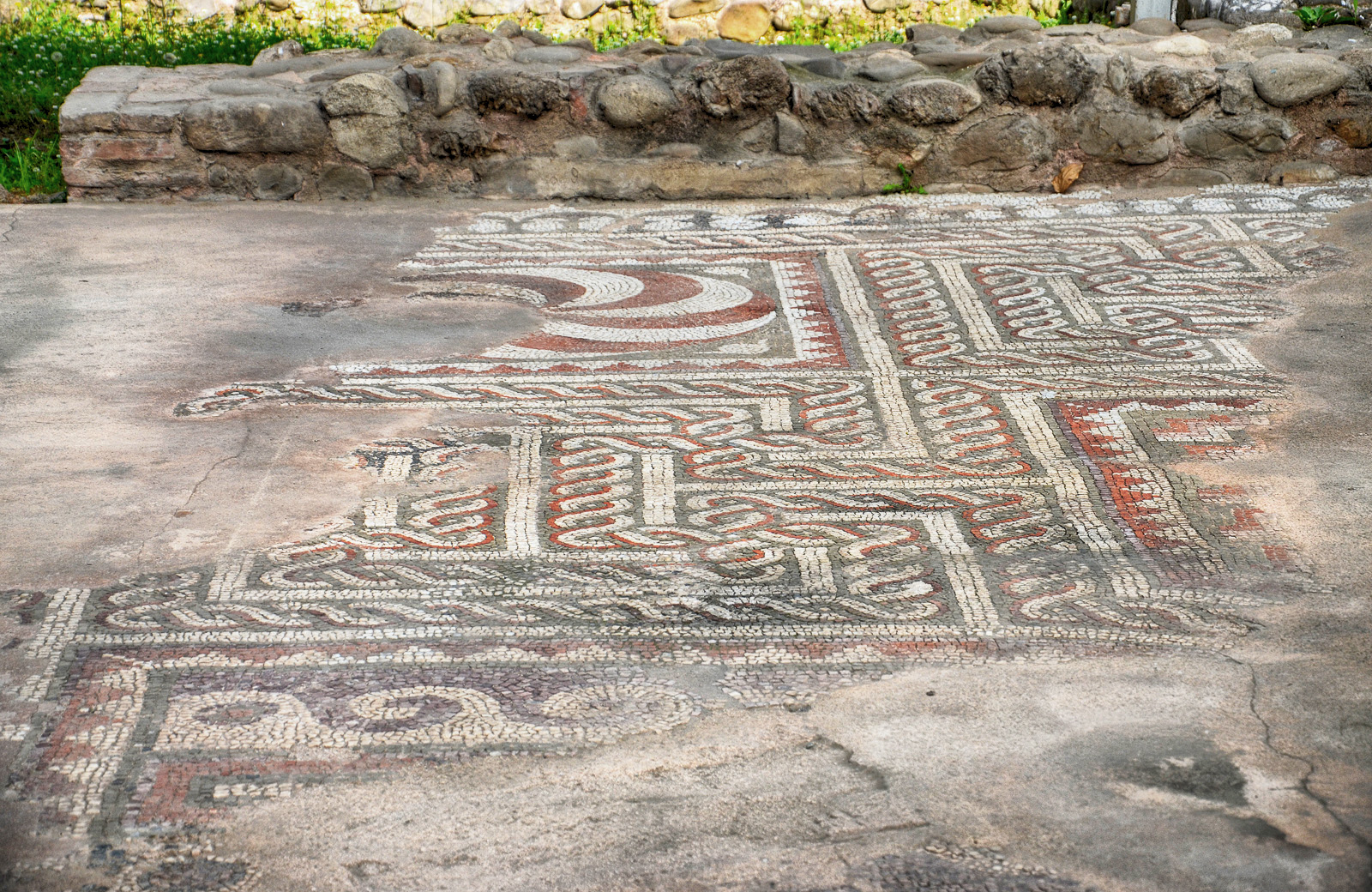
The mosaics of an Ancient Roman house from the 3rd century AD

The area of Tirana has been inhabited by humans since prehistoric times with the earliest recognised reference found at the Cave of Pëllumbas belonging to the Palaeolithic period. Illyrians were the first population of the area and formed most likely the core of the Illyrian kingdom of the Taulantii, which in classical antiquity was centered in the hinterland of Epidamnus. When the Romans arrived in Illyria after their victory of the Illyrian Wars, they populated and integrated the area into their empire under the political control of the city of Rome. The oldest surviving discovery from this period is a Roman house dating to the 3rd century, which was transformed into an aisleless church with a mosaic floor. A castle, possibly known as Tirkan, was built by the Byzantine Emperor Justinian I between the 4th and 6th century and later restored by Ahmed Pasha Toptani in the 18th century.

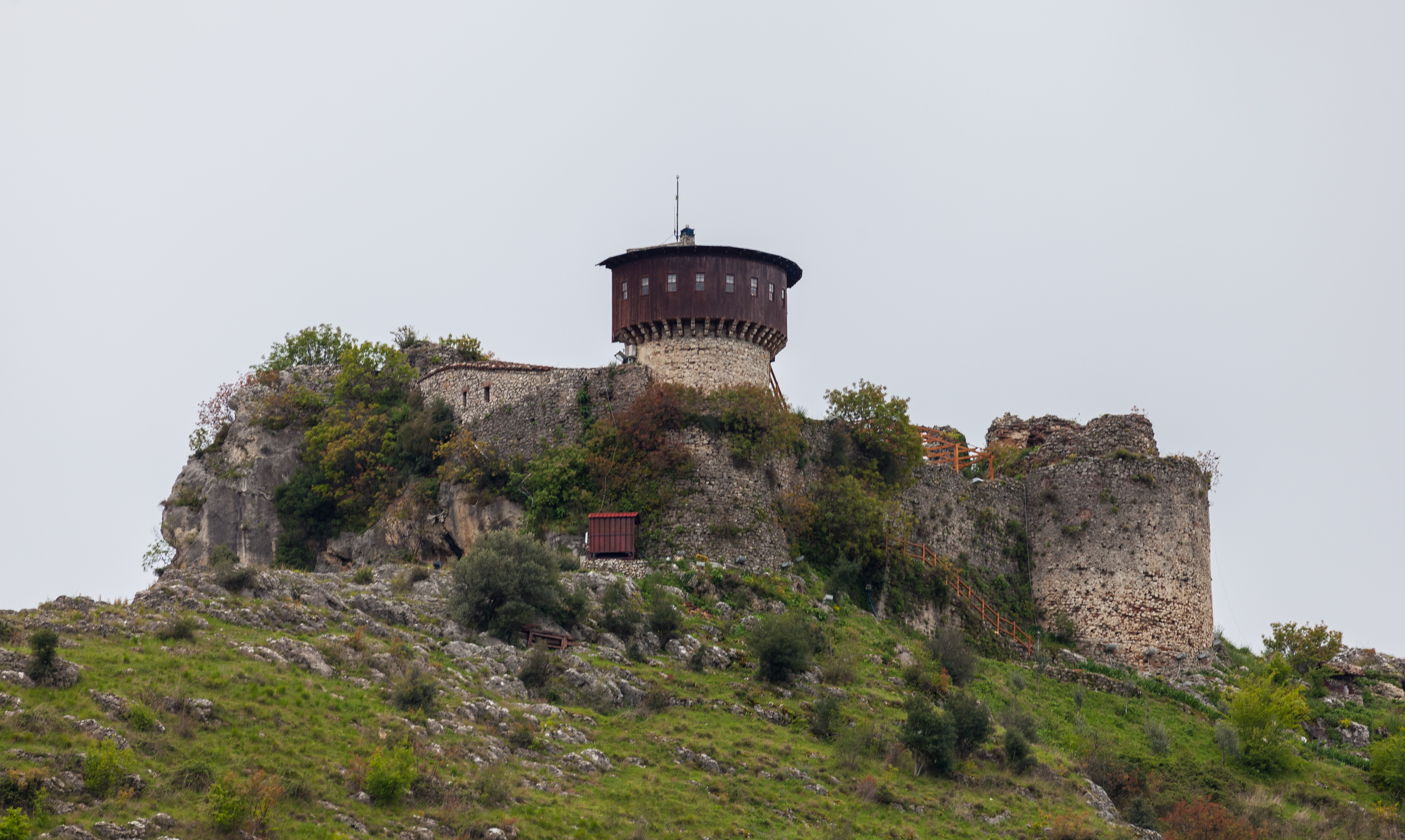
Castle of Petrelë was founded in the 6th century by Justinian I.

Tirana is mentioned in Venetian documents in the 1350s as well as in 1418: "...the resident Pjeter, son of late Domenik from the village of Tirana...". Records of the first land registrations under the Ottomans in 1431–32 show that Tirana consisted of 60 inhabited areas, with nearly 2,028 houses and 7,300 inhabitants. In 1510, Marin Barleti, an Albanian Catholic priest and scholar, in the biography of the Albanian national hero Skanderbeg, Historia de vita et gestis Scanderbegi Epirotarum principis (The story of life and deeds of Skanderbeg, the prince of Epirotes), referred to this area as a small village, distinguishing between "Little Tirana" and "Great Tirana". It is later mentioned in 1572 as Borgo di Tirana.

According to Hahn, the settlement had already started to develop as a bazaar and included several watermills, even before 1614, when Sulejman Bargjini, a local ruler, built the Old Mosque, a small commercial centre, and a hammam (Turkish bathhouse). This is confirmed by oral sources, which state that there were two earlier mosques 300–400 m from the Old Mosque, towards today's Ali Demi Street. The Mosque of Reç and the Mosque of Mujo were positioned on the left side of the Lana River and were older than the Old Mosque. Later, the Et'hem Bey Mosque, built by Molla Bey of Petrela, was constructed. It employed the best artisans in the country and was completed in 1821 by Molla's son Etëhem, who was also Sulejman Bargjini's great-nephew.

In 1800, the first newcomers arrived in the settlement, the so-called ortodoksit. They were Aromanians from villages near Korçë and Pogradec, who settled around modern day Tirana Park on the Artificial Lake. They started to be known as the llacifac and were the first Christians to arrive after the creation of the town. In 1807, Tirana became the centre of the Subprefecture of Krujë-Tirana. After 1816, Tirana languished under the control of the Toptani family of Krujë. Later, Tirana became a sub-prefecture of the newly created Vilayet of Shkodër and the Sanjak of Durrës. In 1889, the Albanian language started to be taught in Tirana's schools, and the patriotic club Bashkimi was founded in 1908.

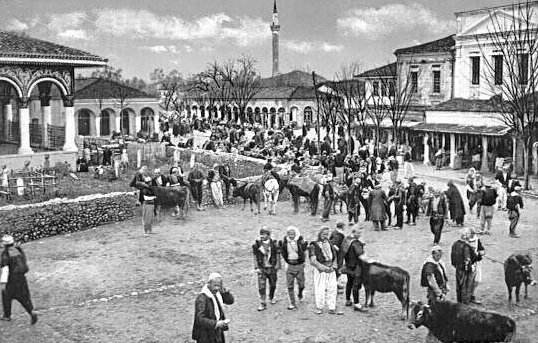
The Old Bazaar at the turn of the 20th century. The Sulejman Pasha Mosque is visible in the background. It was destroyed in World War II.

=== Modern development ===
On 28 November 1912, the national flag was raised in Vlorë by President Ismail Qemali, marking the symbolic birth of Albania as a sovereign country. The next few years, however, were marked by turmoil during the Balkan Wars. On the 27th November 1912 after over 400 years of Ottoman occupation, the Serbian army occupied Tirana and annexed into the Kingdom of Serbia's Durrës County. In response to massacres of Albanians during Serbia's rule, Tirana took part in uprising of the villages led by Haxhi Qamili. Tirana was liberated in 1913 after the Treaty of London which forced the Serbian army to retreat out of Albania's borders. In August 1916, the first city map was compiled by the specialists of the Austro-Hungarian army. Following the capture of the town of Debar by Serbia, many of its Albanian inhabitants fled to Turkey, the rest went to Tirana. Of those that ended up in Istanbul, some of their number migrated to Albania, mainly to Tirana where the Dibran community (people from Dibër County) formed an important segment of the city's population from 1920 onward and for some years thereafter. On 8 February 1920, the Congress of Lushnjë proclaimed Tirana as the temporary capital of Albania, which had gained independence in 1912. The city acquired that status permanently on 31 December 1925. In 1923, the first regulatory city plan was compiled by Austrian architects. The centre of Tirana was the project of Florestano Di Fausto and Armando Brasini, well-known architects of the Mussolini period in Italy. Brasini laid the basis for the modern-day arrangement of the ministerial buildings in the city centre. The plan underwent revisions by Albanian architect Eshref Frashëri, Italian architect Castellani and Austrian architects Weiss and Kohler. The modern Albanian parliament building served as an officers' club. It was there that, in September 1928, Zog of Albania was crowned King Zog I, King of the Albanians.

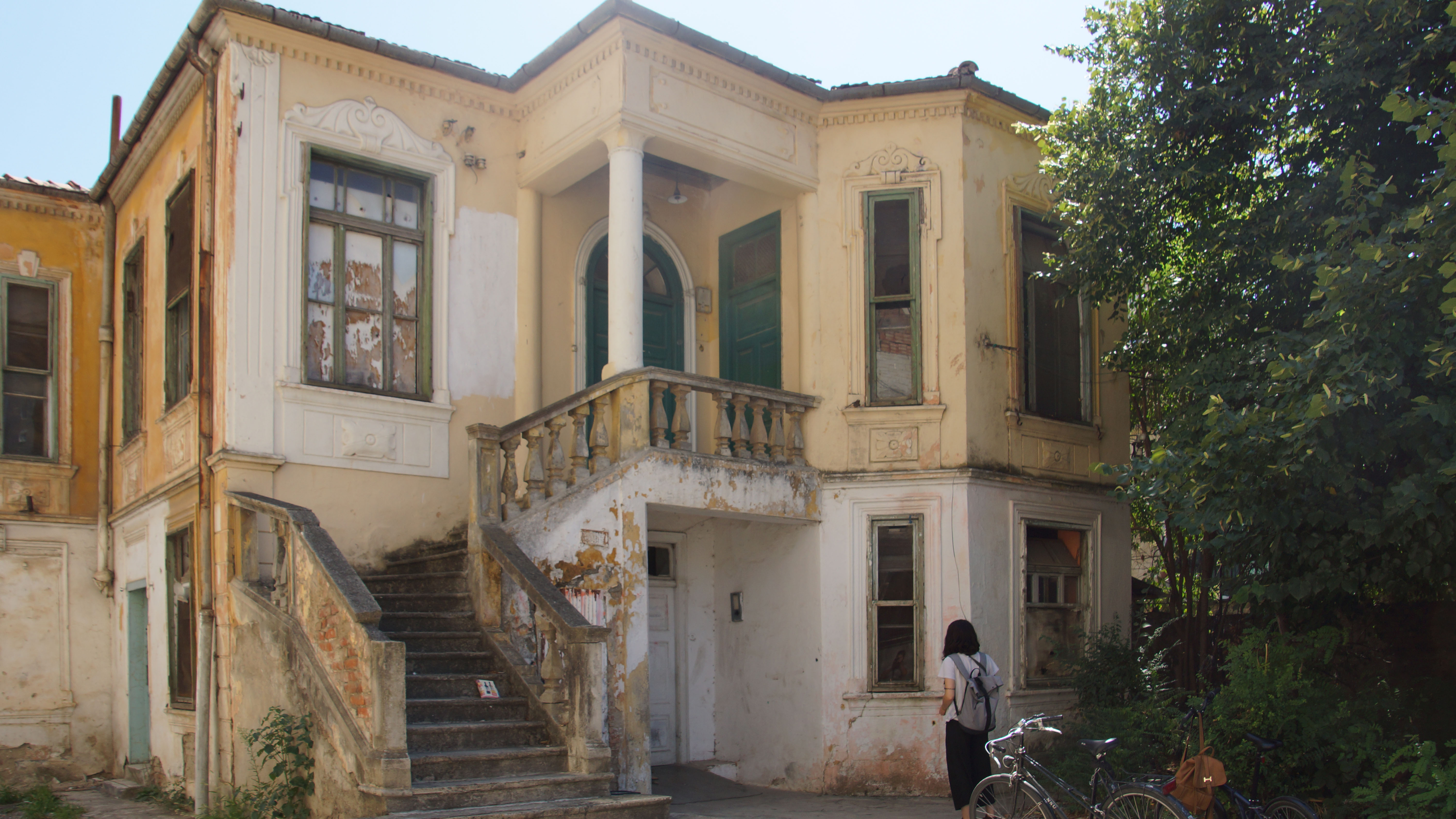
Old villa architecture in Tirana

Tirana was the venue for the signing of the Pact of Tirana between Fascist Italy and Albania. During the rule of King Zog, many Muhaxhirs migrated towards Tirana, which led to a growing population in the capital city in the early 20th century.

In 1939, Tirana was captured by Fascist forces, who appointed a puppet government. In the meantime, Italian architect Gherardo Bosio was asked to elaborate on previous plans and introduce a new project in the area of present-day Mother Teresa Square. A failed assassination attempt was made on Victor Emmanuel III of Italy by a local resistance activist during a visit to Tirana. In November 1941, two emissaries of the Communist Party of Yugoslavia (KPJ), Miladin Popović and Dušan Mugoša, called a meeting of three Albanian communist groups and founded the Communist Party of Albania, and Enver Hoxha soon emerged as its leader.

The town soon became the centre of the Albanian communists, who mobilised locals against Italian fascists and later Nazi Germans, while spreading ideological propaganda. On 4 February 1944, the Gestapo, supported by the forces of Xhafer Deva, executed 86 anti-fascists in Tirana. On 17 November 1944, the town was liberated after a fierce battle between the Communists and German forces. The Nazis eventually withdrew and the communists seized power.

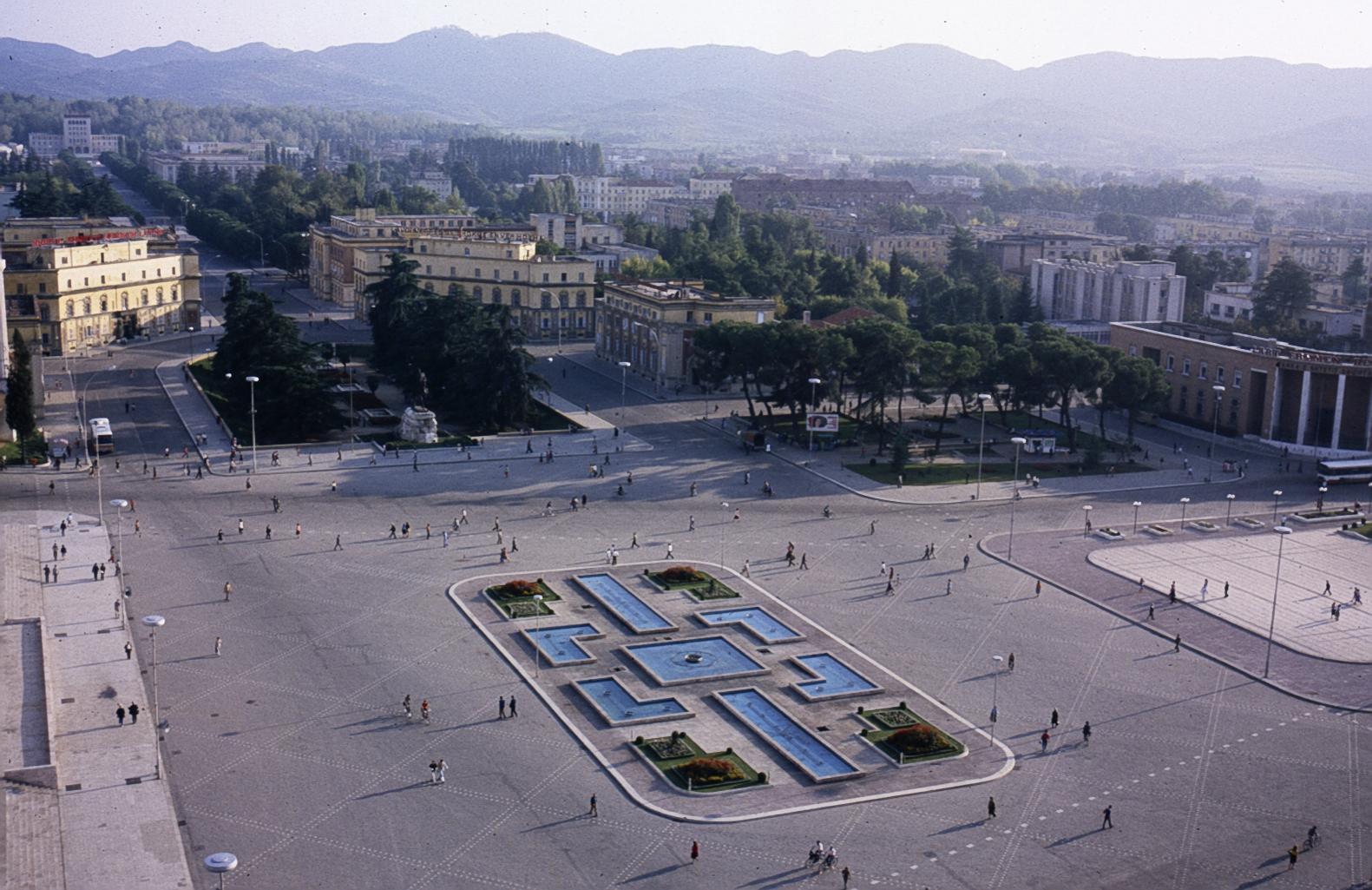
Skanderbeg Square in 1988, two years prior to the Fall of communism in Albania

From 1944 to 1991, massive socialist-style apartment complexes and factories were built, while Skanderbeg Square was redesigned, with a number of buildings demolished. For instance, Tirana's former Old Bazaar and the Orthodox Cathedral were razed to the ground in order to build the Soviet-styled Palace of Culture. The northern portion of the main boulevard was renamed Stalin Boulevard and his statue was erected in the city square. Because private car ownership was banned, mass transportation consisted mainly of bicycles, trucks and buses. After Hoxha's death, a pyramidal museum was constructed in his memory by the government.

Before and after the proclamation of Albania's policy of self-imposed isolationism, a number of high-profile figures paid visits to the city, such as Soviet leader Nikita Khrushchev, Chinese Premier Zhou Enlai and East German Foreign Minister Oskar Fischer. In 1985, Enver Hoxha's funeral was held in Tirana. A few years later, Mother Teresa became the first religious figure to visit the country after the end of Albania's long anti-religious atheist stance. She paid respects to her mother and sister resting at a local cemetery.

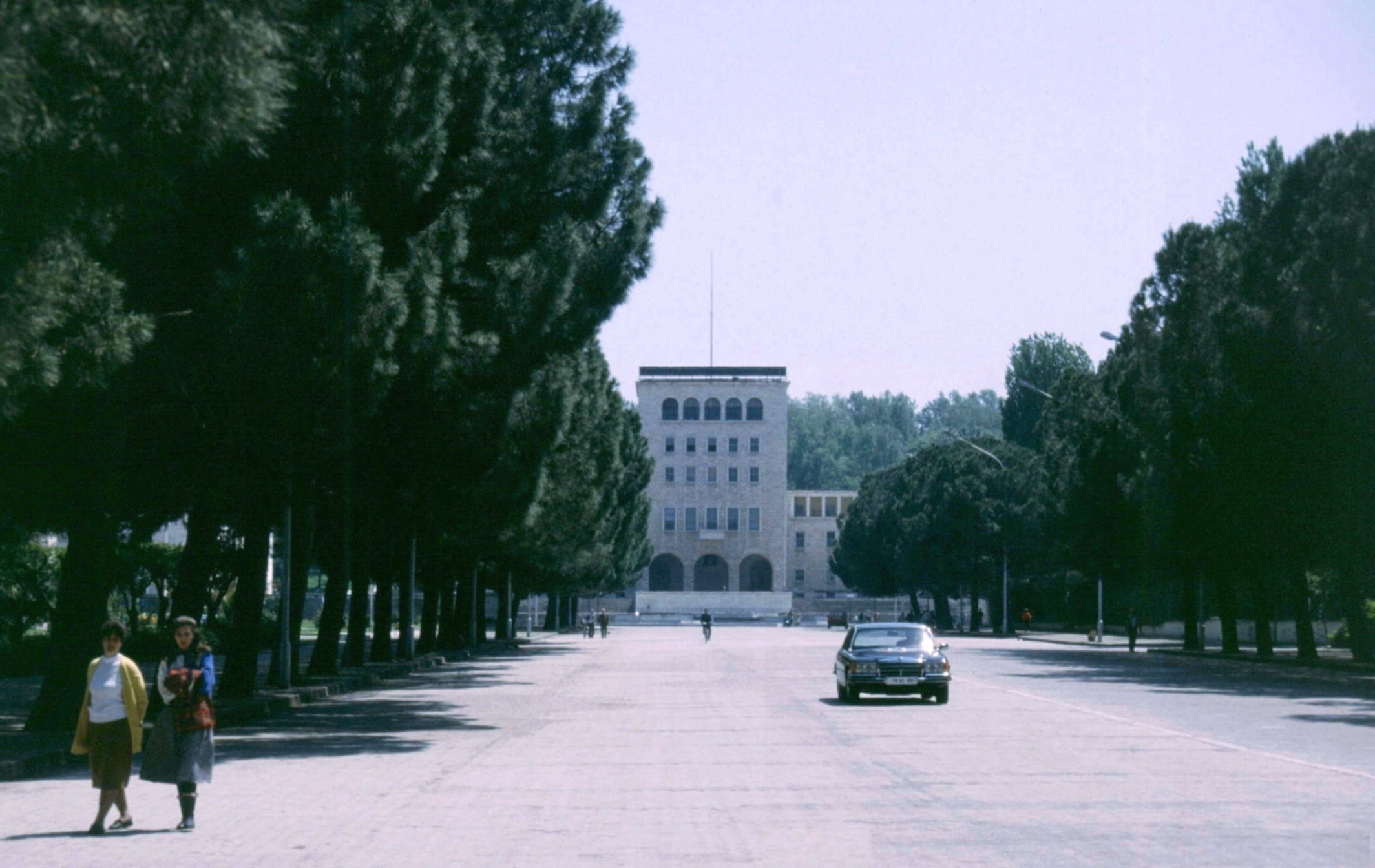
Tirana's main boulevard in 1991

Starting at the campus and ending at Skanderbeg Square with the toppling of Enver Hoxha's statue, the city saw significant demonstrations by University of Tirana students demanding political freedoms in the early 1990s. On the political aspect, the city witnessed a number of events. Personalities visited the capital, such as then-U.S. Secretary of State James Baker and Pope John Paul II. The former visit came amidst the historical setting after the fall of communism, as hundreds of thousands were chanting in Skanderbeg Square Baker's famous saying of "Freedom works!". Pope John Paul II became the first major religious leader to visit Tirana.

During the Balkans turmoil in the mid-1990s, the city experienced dramatic events such as the unfolding of the 1997 unrest in Albania and a failed coup d'état on 14 September 1998.

In 1999, following the Kosovo War, Tirana Airport became a NATO airbase, serving its mission in the former Yugoslavia.

=== Contemporary ===
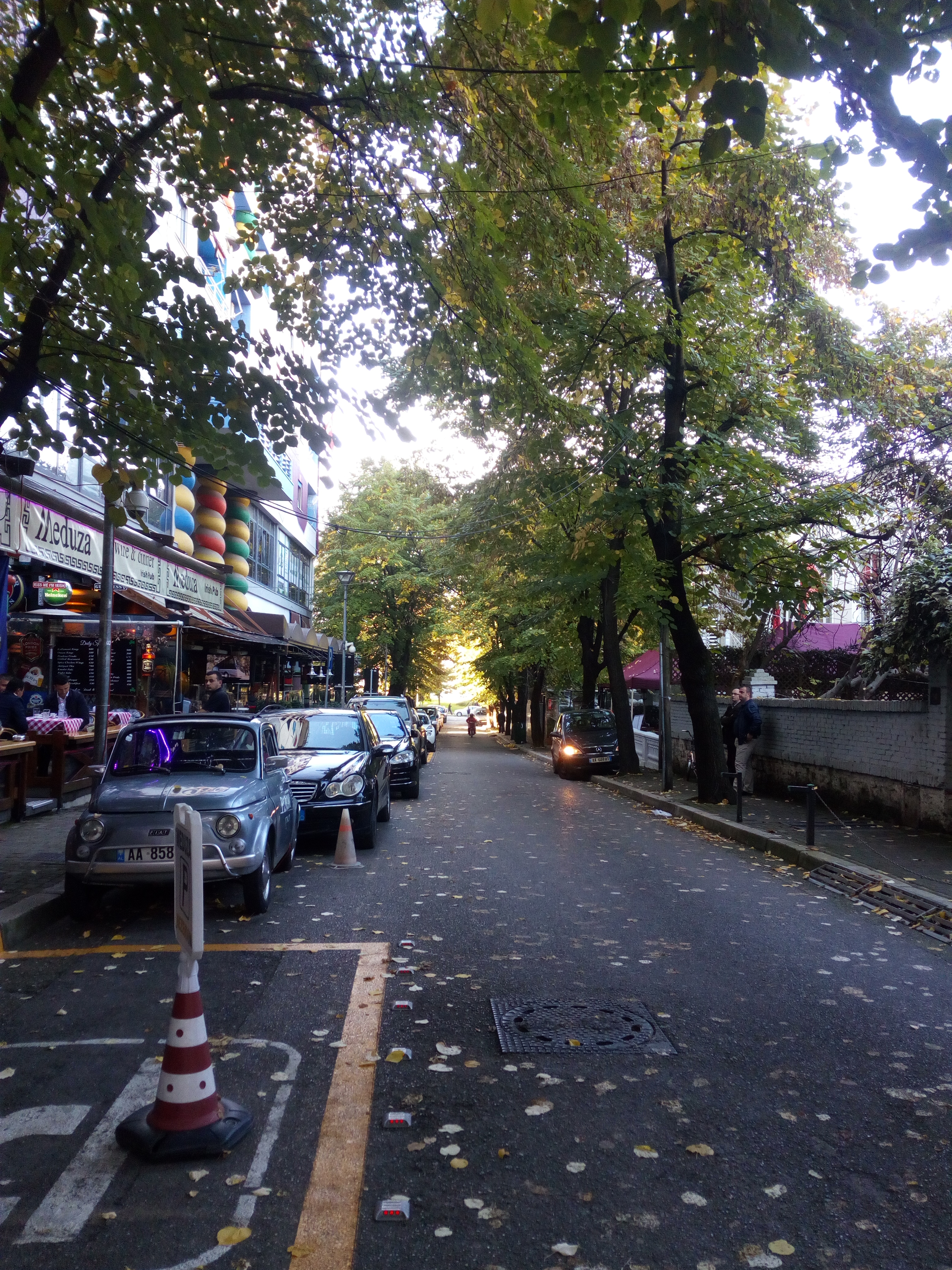
Mustafa Matohiti Street near the Pyramid of Tirana. After the fall of communism in Albania, many areas saw new development.

During his term from 2000 to 2011, the former mayor of Tirana, Edi Rama, undertook a campaign to demolish illegal constructed buildings across Tirana as well as along the river banks of Lanë to bring the area to its pre-1990 state. In an attempt to widen roads, Rama authorized the bulldozing of private properties so that they could be paved over, thus widening streets. Most main roads underwent reconstruction, including the Unaza, Rruga e Kavajës and the main boulevard. Rama also led the initiative to paint the façades of Tirana's buildings in bright colours, although much of their interiors continued to degrade. Rama's critics claimed that he focused too much attention on cosmetic changes without fixing any of the major problems such as shortages of drinking water and electricity.

In June 2007, George W. Bush traveled to Tirana on an official state visit, becoming the first U.S. President to visit the former communist country. In 2008, the Gërdec explosions were felt in the capital as windows were shattered and citizens shaken. In January 2011, the Albanian opposition demonstrations were triggered in front of the governmental buildings in Tirana protesting against political corruption and state capture, particularly associated with the former prime minister Sali Berisha's government. In September 2014, Pope Francis made an official state visit to Tirana simultaneously becoming the second pontiff to visit Albania, after Pope John Paul II in 1992.

Following the municipal elections of 2015, power was transferred from the Democratic Party representative Lulzim Basha to the Socialist Party candidate Erion Veliaj. Albania then underwent a territorial reform, in which defunct communes were merged with municipalities. Thirteen of Tirana's former communes were integrated as administrative units joining the existing eleven. Since then, Tirana is undergoing significant changes in infrastructure, law enforcement and new projects, as well as continuing the ones started by Veliaj's predecessor. In their first few council meetings, 242 social houses got allocated to families in need. Construction permits were suspended until the capital's development plan is revised and synthesized.

Between December 2018 and February 2019, a series of demonstrations erupted in the central areas of Tirana and other cities of the country in response to a controversial law on higher education, poor quality of teaching, high tuition rates and corruption. In September 2019, Tirana was ravaged by a 5.6 magnitude earthquake with an epicenter located near Durrës. Two months after, in November 2019, another strong earthquake with the magnitude of 6.4 hit the region again resulting in comparatively few damages in Tirana. The same month, Tirana was announced as the European Youth Capital for 2022 with a planned program including events of cultural and social importance.

In December 2022, Tirana hosted the EU-Western Balkans summit, marking the inaugural summit to be held outside the European Union's borders. On 21 September 2024, it was reported that Prime Minister of Albania Edi Rama was planning to create the Sovereign State of the Bektashi Order, a sovereign microstate for the Order within Tirana.

== Geography ==
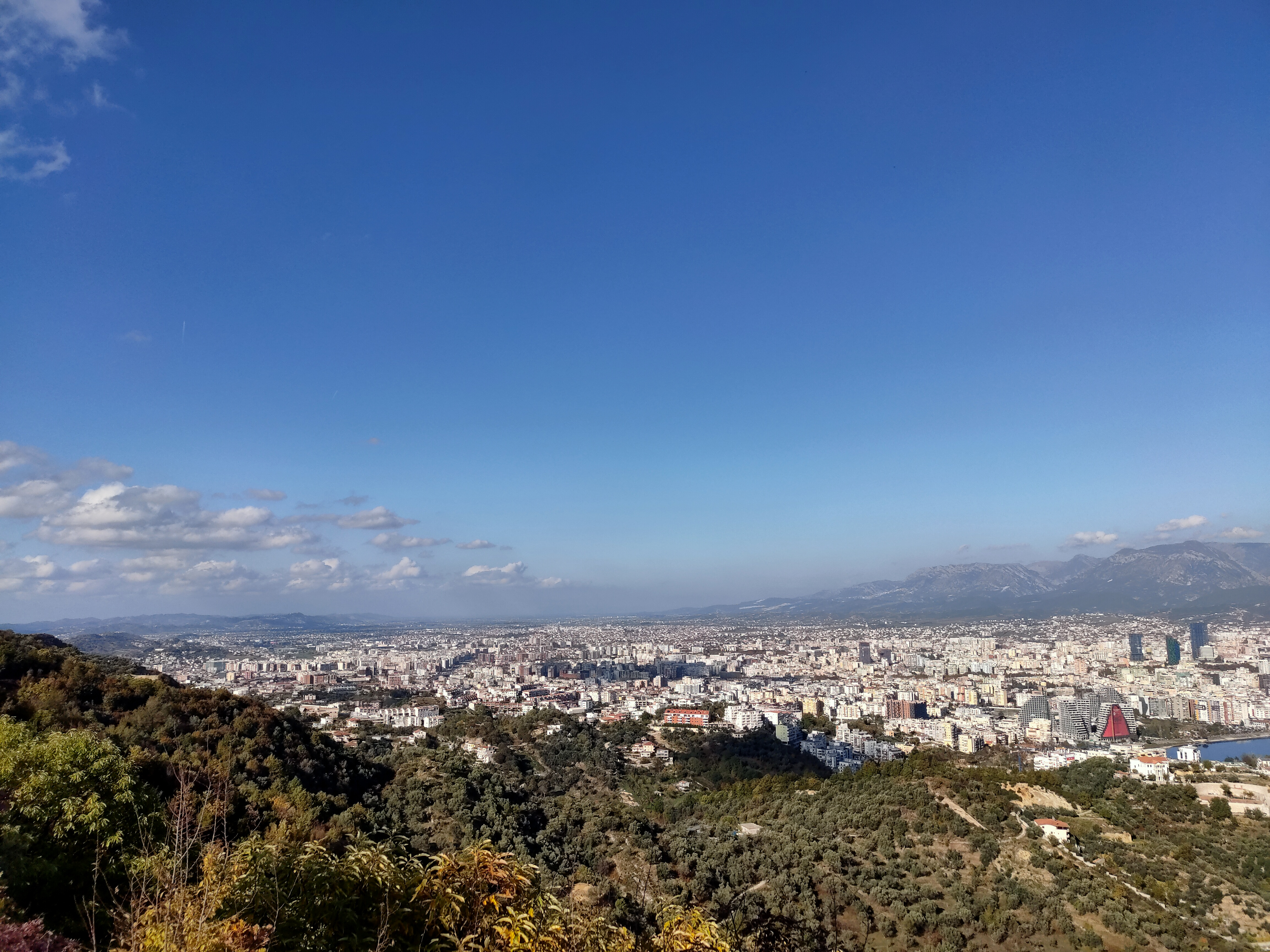
View of Tirana Metropolitan Area

Tirana extends at the Plain of Tirana in the centre of Albania between the mount of Dajti in the east, the hills of Kërrabe, Sauk and Vaqarr in the south, and a valley to the north overlooking the Adriatic Sea. The average altitude is about 110 meters (360 ft) above sea level, with a maximum of 1,828 metres (5,997 feet) at Maja Mincekut of Mali me Gropa in Shenmeri.

The city is surrounded by two important protected areas: the Dajti National Park and Mali me Gropa-Bizë-Martanesh Protected Landscape. In winter, the mountains are often covered with snow and are a popular retreat for the population of Tirana, which rarely receives snowfalls. In terms of biodiversity, the forests are mainly composed of pine, oak and beech, while its interior relief is dotted with canyons, waterfalls, caves, lakes and other landforms. Thanks to its natural heritage, it is considered the "Natural Balcony of Tirana". The mountain can be reached by a narrow asphalt mountain road onto an area known as Fusha e Dajtit. From this small area there is a view of Tirana and its plain.

Tiranë river flows through the city, as does the Lanë river. Tirana is home to several artificial lakes, including Tirana, Farka, Tufina, and Kashar. The present municipality was formed in the 2015 local government reform by the merger of the former municipalities of Baldushk, Bërzhitë, Dajt, Farkë, Kashar, Krrabë, Ndroq, Petrelë, Pezë, Shëngjergj, Tirana, Vaqarr, Zall-Bastar and Zall-Herr, which became municipal units. The seat of the municipality is the city of Tirana.

=== Climate ===
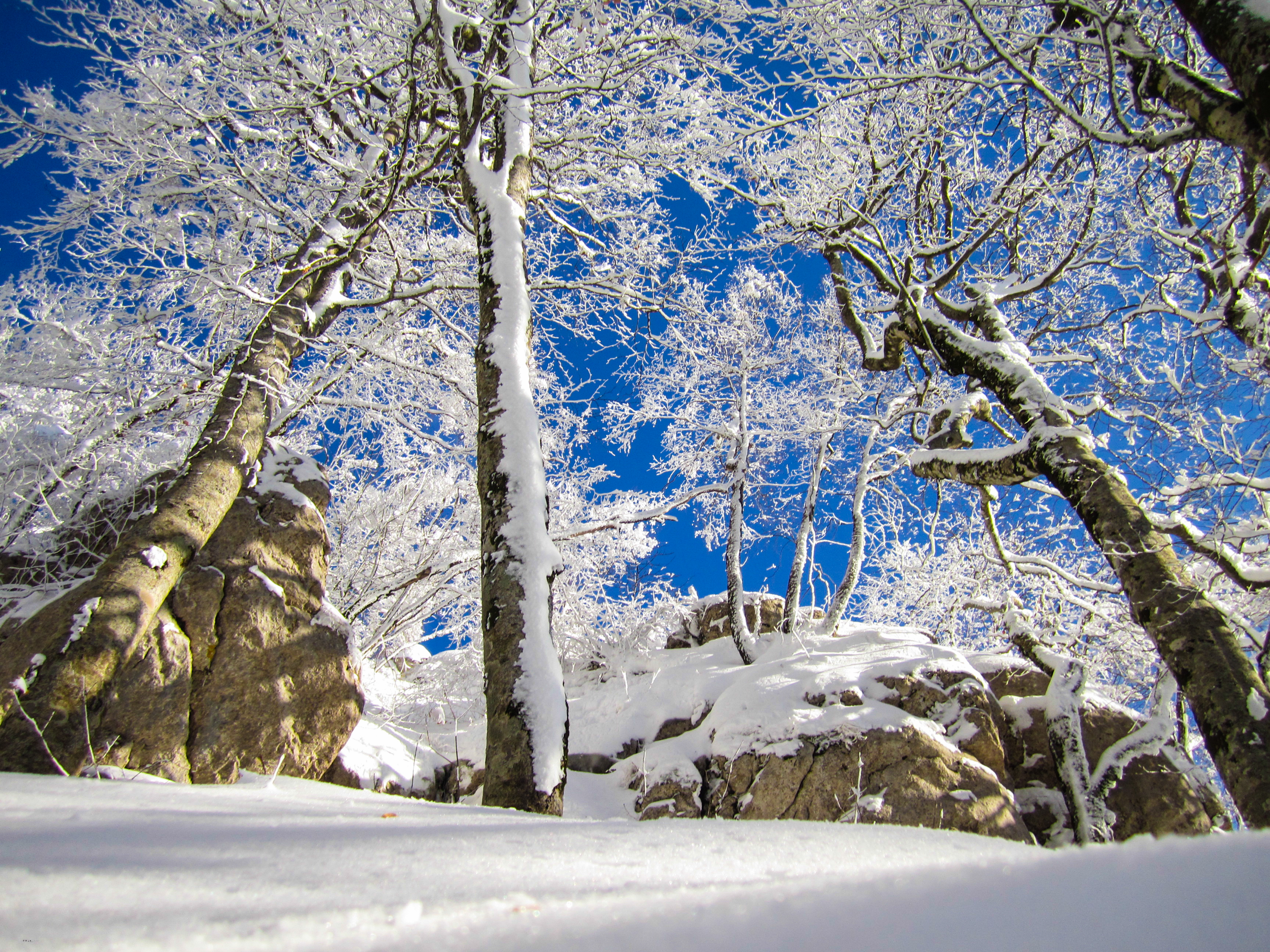
Snow at the Dajti National Park. It generally melts quickly in the region.

Tirana has a humid subtropical climate (Cfa) according to the Köppen climate classification and receives enough precipitation during summer to avoid the Mediterranean climate (Csa) classification.

The average precipitation in Tirana is about 1,266 mm (49.8 in) per year. The city receives the majority of precipitation in winter months, which occurs from November to March, and less in summer months, from June to September. In terms of precipitation, both rain and snow, the city is ranked among the wettest cities in Europe.

Temperatures vary throughout the year from an average of 6.7 °C (44.1 °F) in January to 24 °C (75 °F) in July. Springs and summers are very warm to hot often reaching over 20 °C (68 °F) from May to September. During autumn and winter, from November to March, the average temperature drops and is not lower than 6.7 °C (44.1 °F). The city receives approximately 2500 hours of sun.

Climate data for Tirana Airport (WMO #13615) — 1991–2020 normals
Month	Jan	Feb	Mar	Apr	May	Jun	Jul	Aug	Sep	Oct	Nov	Dec	Year
Record high °C (°F)	21.3 (70.3)	28.0 (82.4)	30.3 (86.5)	32.6 (90.7)	35.9 (96.6)	39.7 (103.5)	43.0 (109.4)	43.6 (110.5)	39.7 (103.5)	36.1 (97.0)	31.3 (88.3)	22.5 (72.5)	43.6 (110.5)
Mean daily maximum °C (°F)	12.8 (55.0)	13.9 (57.0)	17.2 (63.0)	20.6 (69.1)	25.0 (77.0)	29.4 (84.9)	32.2 (90.0)	32.8 (91.0)	28.3 (82.9)	23.3 (73.9)	18.3 (64.9)	13.0 (55.4)	22.3 (72.1)
Daily mean °C (°F)	7.5 (45.5)	8.6 (47.5)	11.4 (52.5)	14.8 (58.6)	18.9 (66.0)	23.1 (73.6)	25.3 (77.5)	25.6 (78.1)	21.7 (71.1)	17.2 (63.0)	12.8 (55.0)	9.1 (48.4)	16.3 (61.3)
Mean daily minimum °C (°F)	2.2 (36.0)	3.2 (37.8)	5.6 (42.1)	8.9 (48.0)	12.8 (55.0)	16.7 (62.1)	18.3 (64.9)	18.3 (64.9)	15.0 (59.0)	11.1 (52.0)	7.2 (45.0)	3.9 (39.0)	10.3 (50.5)
Record low °C (°F)	−10.4 (13.3)	−9.4 (15.1)	−7.0 (19.4)	−1.0 (30.2)	2.5 (36.5)	5.6 (42.1)	4.2 (39.6)	10.0 (50.0)	3.8 (38.8)	−1.3 (29.7)	−4.3 (24.3)	−6.9 (19.6)	−10.4 (13.3)
Average precipitation mm (inches)	106 (4.2)	118 (4.6)	102 (4.0)	90 (3.5)	89 (3.5)	64 (2.5)	42 (1.7)	40 (1.6)	99 (3.9)	112 (4.4)	151 (5.9)	139 (5.5)	1,252 (49.3)
Average precipitation days (≥ 1 mm)	11	10	11	13	11	7	5	5	9	9	11	12	115
Average relative humidity (%)	77	73	70	71	71	68	64	64	70	74	79	78	71.6
Mean monthly sunshine hours	124	125	165	191	263	298	354	327	264	218	127	88	2,544
Average ultraviolet index	2	2	4	6	8	9	9	8	6	4	2	1	5
Source: World Meteorological Organization / Climatestotravel

=== Urbanism ===
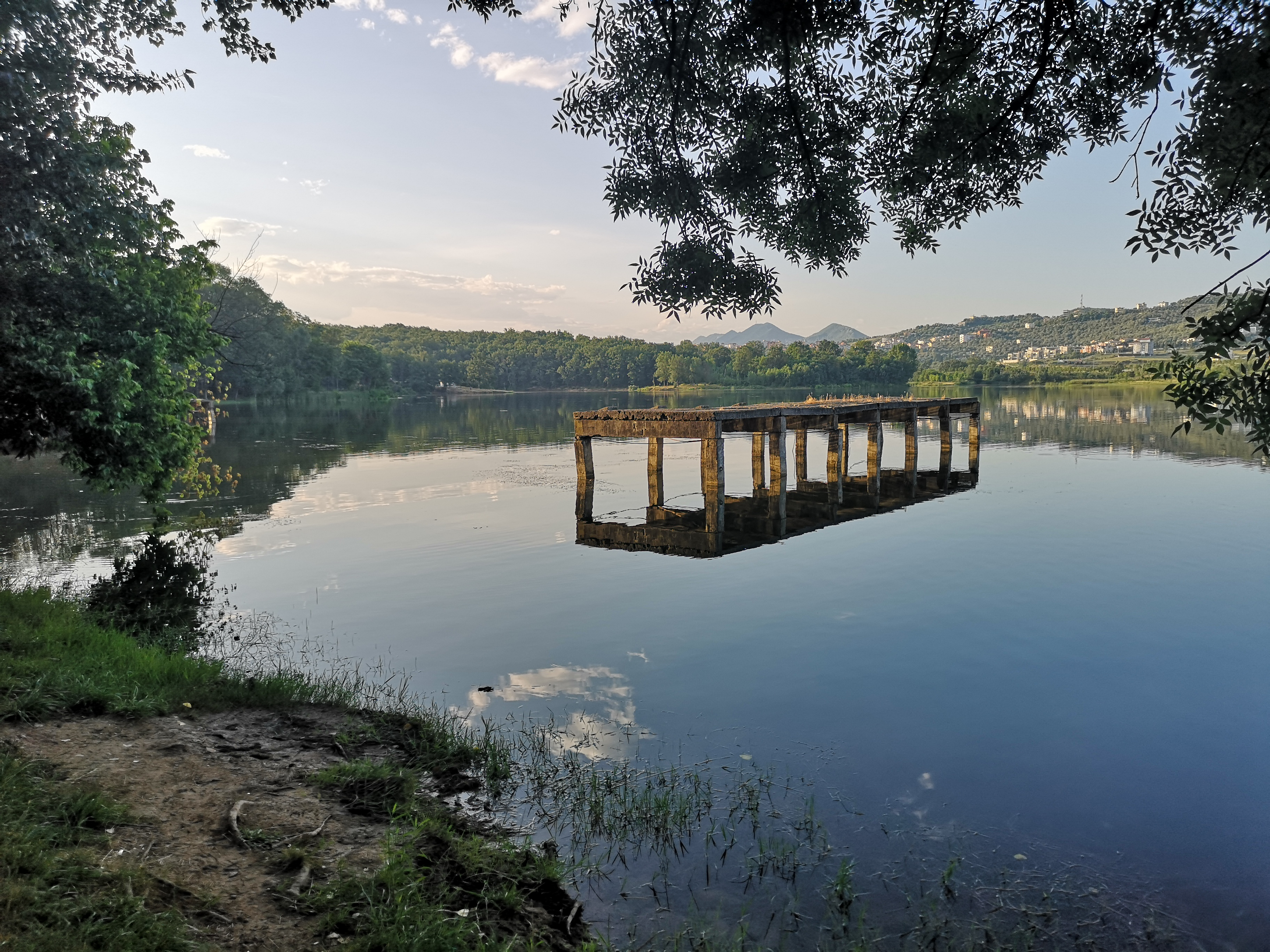
The artificial lake of Tirana built from local waters in 1955

In September 2015, Tirana organized its first vehicle-free day, joining forces with numerous cities across the globe to fight against the existing problem of urban air pollution. This initiative resulted in a considerable drop in both air and noise pollution, encouraging the Municipality to organise a vehicle-free day every month.

The city suffers from problems such as waste management, high levels of air pollution and significant noise pollution. Over the last decades, air pollution has become a pressing concern as the number of cars has increased. These are mostly 1990s and early 2000s diesel cars, while it is widely believed that the fuel used in Albania contains larger amounts of sulfur and lead than in the European Union. Effective 1 January 2019, the government has imposed an import ban of used vehicles made prior to 2005 in an effort to curb pollution, encourage the buying of new cars from certified domestic dealerships, and to improve overall road safety. Another source of pollution are PM10 and PM2.5 inhaled particulate matter and NO_{2} gases resulting from rapid growth in the construction of new buildings and expanding road infrastructure.

Untreated solid waste is present in the city and outskirts. Additionally, there have been complaints of excessive noise pollution. Despite the problems, the Grand Park at the Artificial Lake has some effect on absorbing CO_{2} emissions, while over 2.000 trees have been planted around sidewalks.

Works for four new large parks have started in the summer of 2015 located in Kashar, Farkë, Vaqarr, and Dajt. These parks are part of the new urban plan striving to increase the concentration of green spaces in the capital. The government has included designated green areas around Tirana as part of the Tirana Greenbelt where construction is not permitted or limited.

== Politics ==
=== Administration ===

The municipality of Tirana is encompassed in the County of Tirana within the Central Region of Albania and consists of the rural administrative units of Baldushk, Bërzhitë, Dajt, Farkë, Kashar, Krrabë, Ndroq, Petrelë, Pezë, Shëngjergj, Vaqarr, Zall-Bastar, Zall-Herr and Tirana. The administrative unit of Tirana is further partitioned into eleven urban administrative units, namely Tirana 1, Tirana 2, Tirana 3, Tirana 4, Tirana 5, Tirana 6, Tirana 7, Tirana 8, Tirana 9, Tirana 10 and Tirana 11.

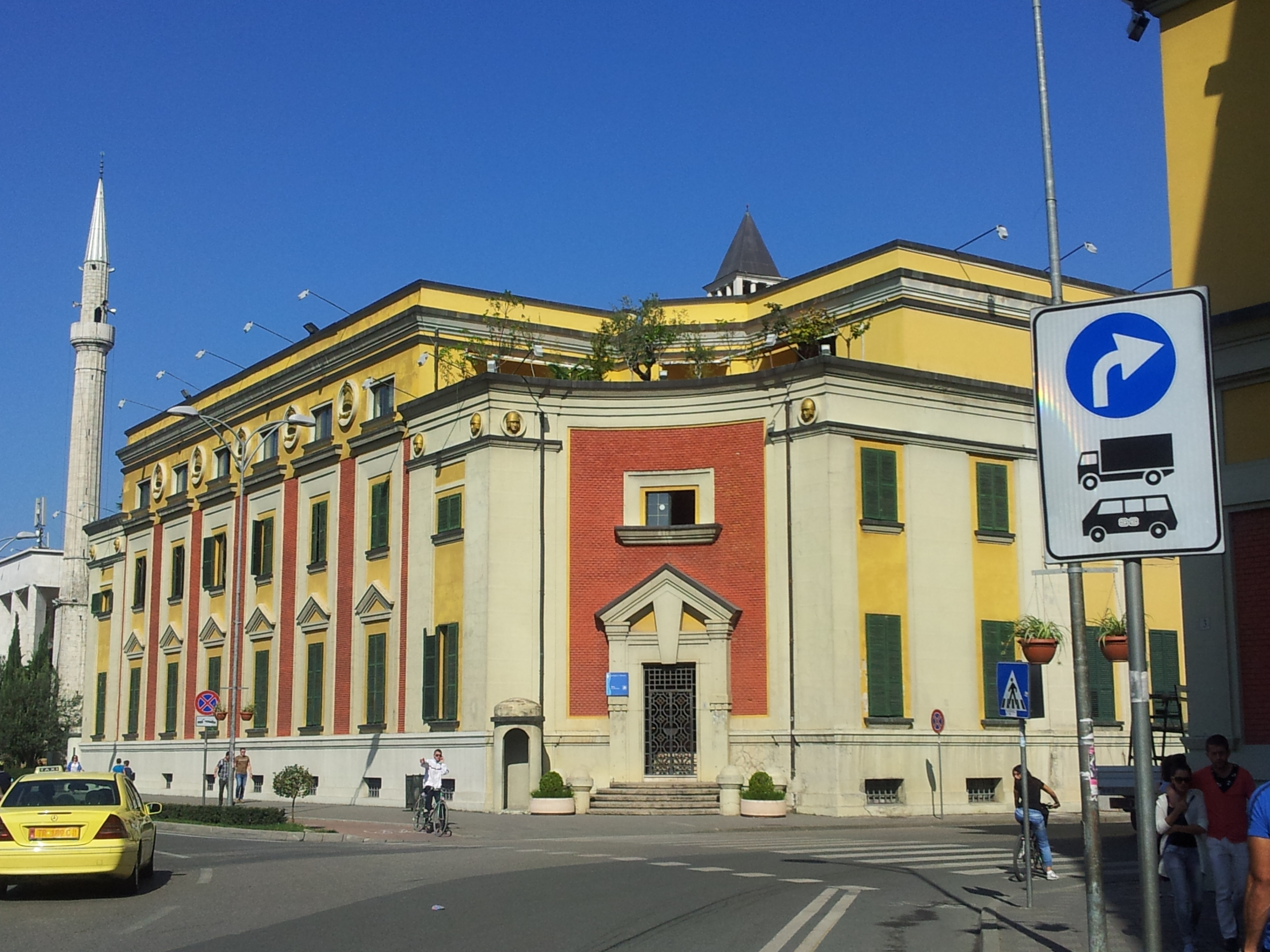
Tirana City Hall

The Mayor of Tirana along with the Cabinet of Tirana exercises executive power. The Assembly of Tirana functions as the city parliament and consists of 55 members, serving four-year terms. It primarily deals with budget, global orientations and relations between the city and the Government of Albania. It has 14 committees and its chairman is Aldrin Dalipi from the Socialist Party. Each of the members have a specific portfolio such as economy, finance, judicial, education, health care, and several professional services, agencies and institutes.

In 2000, the centre of Tirana from the central campus of University of Tirana in the Mother Teresa Square up to the Skanderbeg Square, was declared the place of Cultural Assembly, and given state protection. The historical core of the capital lies around pedestrian only Murat Toptani Street, while the most prominent city district is Blloku. In 2010, the municipality undertook the installing of street name signs and entrance numbers while every apartment entrance was physically stamped.

=== National capital ===
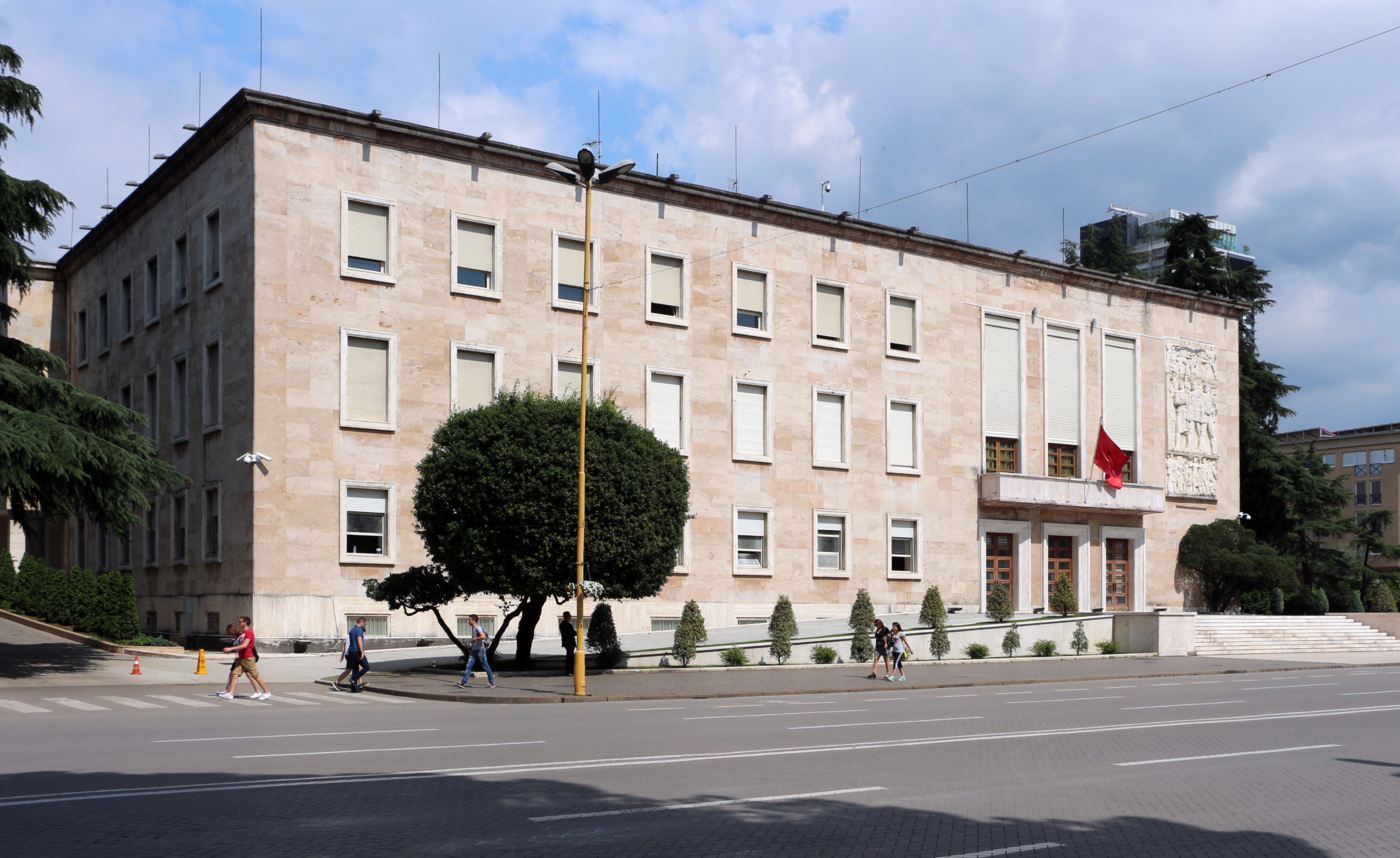
The Kryeministria at the Dëshmorët e Kombit Boulevard is the official office of the Prime Minister of Albania.

Tirana is the capital city of the Republic of Albania thus playing an essential role in shaping the political and economic life of the country. It is the home to government functions and institutions for which the government of Albania is responsible, as for instance the executive, juridical and legislative branches of Albania.

The President and Prime Minister of Albania officially reside and work in Tirana specifically at the Presidenca and Kryeministria, respectively, nevertheless the Parliament of Albania is headquartered at the Dëshmorët e Kombit Boulevard. Tirana is also the home to the national Constitutional Court and Supreme Court. Important national institutions housed in Tirana include the Appeal Court and Administrative Court.

The Bank of Albania is located at the Skanderbeg Square while other institutions such as the ministries of Culture, Defence, Education, Finance, Foreign Affairs, Health, Infrastructure, Internal Affairs, Justice and Tourism are spread over Tirana. The city is also the home to all the consulates and embassies in Albania, thereby making it an important centre for international diplomacy in the country.

=== International relations ===
Tirana is a founding member of the Union of Albanian Municipalities in the Region. Tirana is twinned with Ankara, Beijing, Bursa, Doha, Florence, Kharkiv, Sarajevo and has signed partnership agreements with Verona and Zagreb. (Note: Citations regarding the twin or sister cities of Tirana:) It has also signed special bilateral agreements with Zaragoza.

== Economy ==
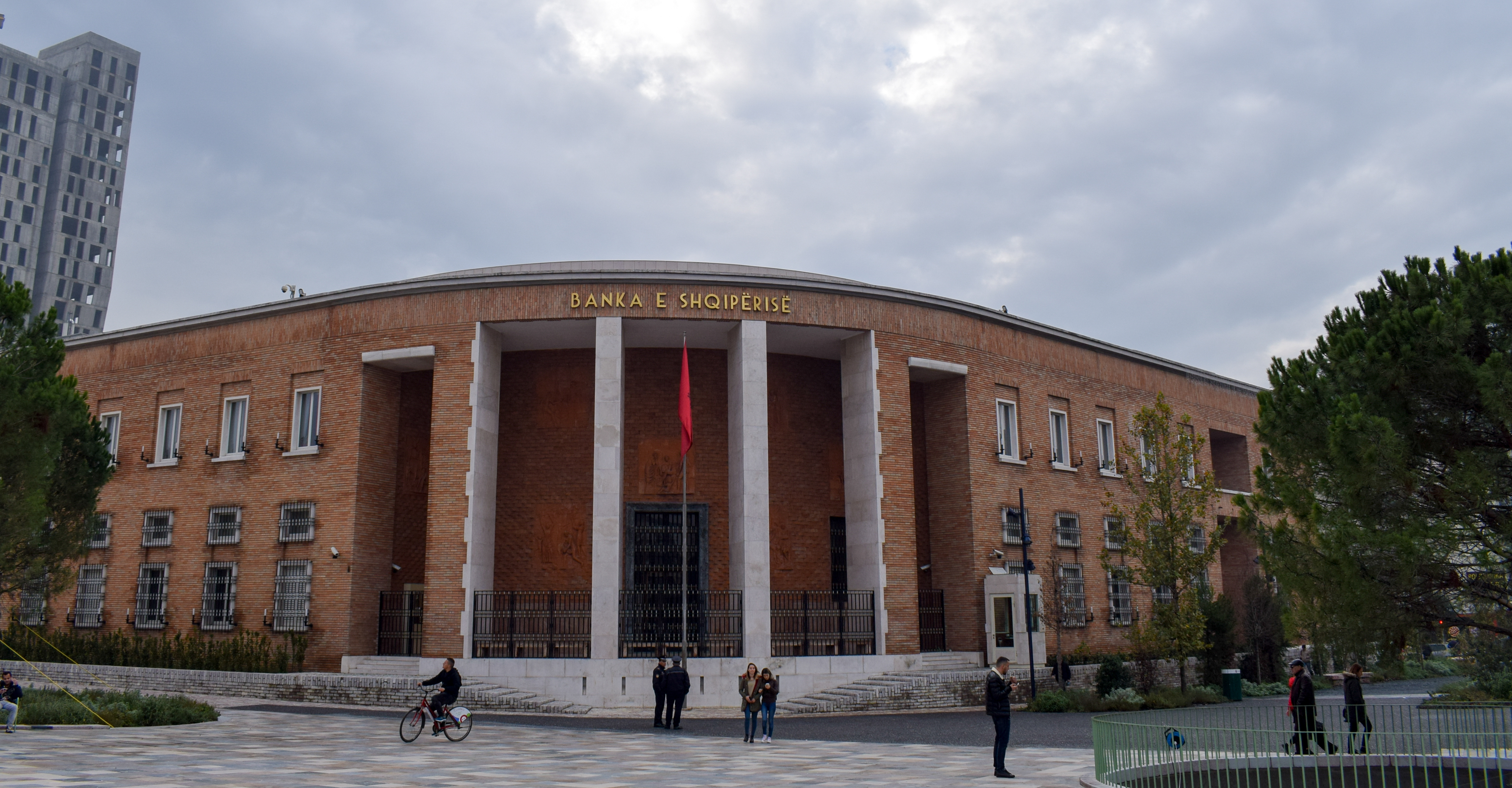
Bank of Albania

Tirana is the heart of the economy of Albania and the most industrialised and economically fastest growing region in Albania. Of the main sectors, the tertiary sector is the most important for the economy of Tirana and employs more than 68% of work force of Tirana. 26% of the working population makes up the secondary sector followed by the primary sector with only 5%.

The city began to develop at the beginning of the 16th century as it was part of the Ottoman Empire, when a bazaar was established, and its craftsmen manufactured silk and cotton fabrics, leather, ceramics and iron, silver and gold artefacts. In the 20th century, the city and its surrounding areas expanded rapidly and became the most heavily industrialised region of the country.

The most significant contribution is made by the tertiary sector which has developed considerably since the fall of communism in Albania. Forming the financial centre of the country, the financial industry is a major component of the city's tertiary sector and remains in good conditions overall due to privatization and the commendable monetary policy. All of the most important financial institutions, such as the Bank of Albania and the Albanian Stock Exchange are centred in Tirana as well as most of the banking companies such as the Banka Kombëtare Tregtare, Raiffeisen Bank, Credins Bank, Intesa Sanpaolo Bank and Tirana Bank.

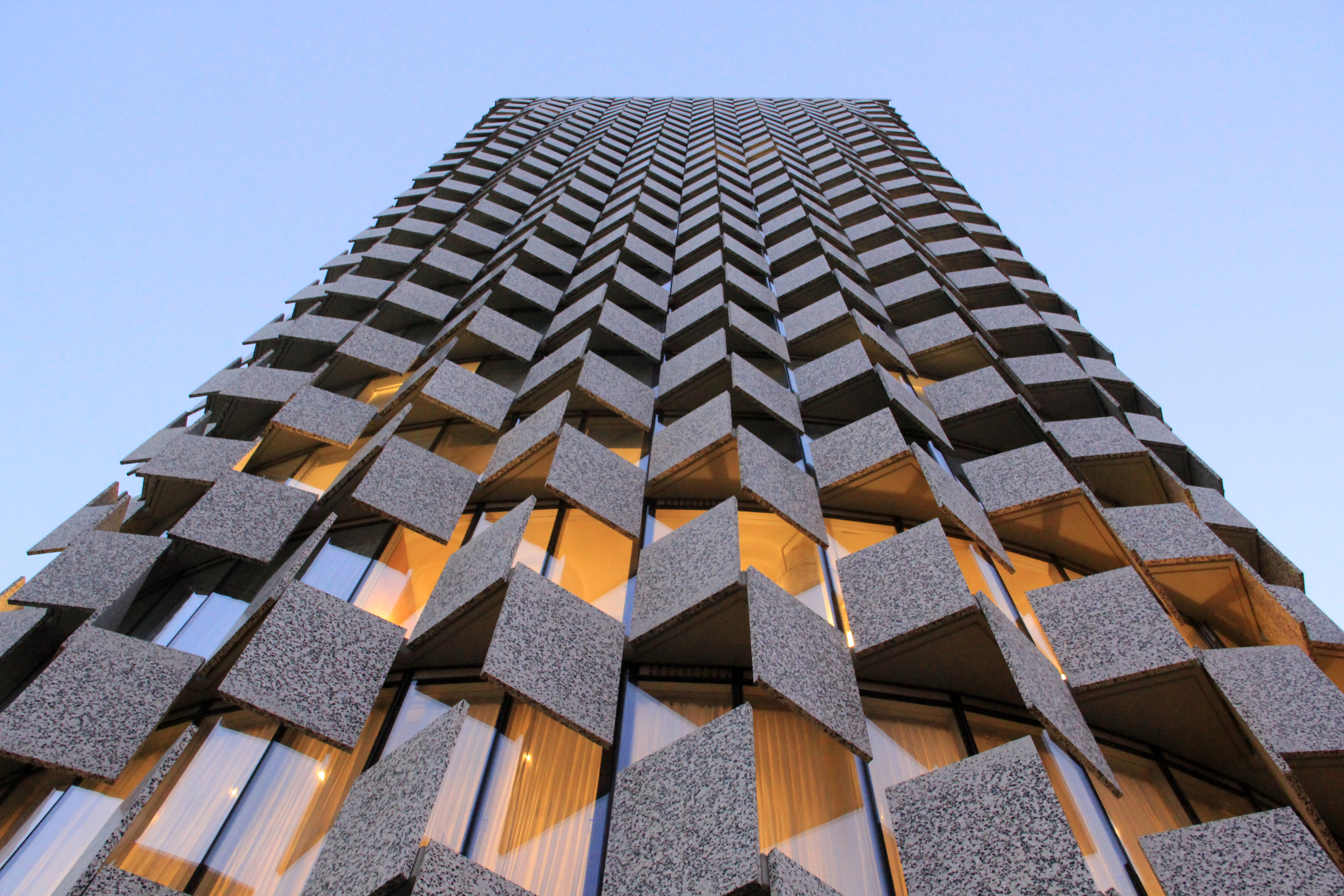
Maritim Plaza Tirana is in the centre of Tirana.

The telecommunication industry represents another major and growing contributor to the sector. A rapid development occurred as well as after the end of communism and decades of isolationism mainly due to the new national policy of reform and opening up sped up the industry's development. Vodafone, Telekom Albania and Eagle are the leading telecommunication providers in Tirana, as in all the country.

The tourism industry of the city has expanded in recent years to become a vital component of the economy. Tirana has been officially dubbed as 'The Place Beyond Belief' by local authorities. The increasing number of international arrivals at the Tirana International Airport and Port of Durrës from across Europe, Australia and Asia has rapidly grown the number of foreign visitors in the city.

The largest hotels of the city are the Tirana International Hotel, Maritim Plaza Tirana both situated in the heart of the city near Skanderbeg Square, and the Hyatt-owned luxury Mak Hotel Tirana located next to the Air Albania Stadium, where Mariott Tirana Hotel is also planned to open. Other major hotels present in central Tirana include the Rogner Hotel, Hilton Garden Inn Tirana, Xheko Imperial Hotel, Best Western Premier Ark Hotel, and Mondial Hotel.

== Infrastructure ==
=== Transport ===
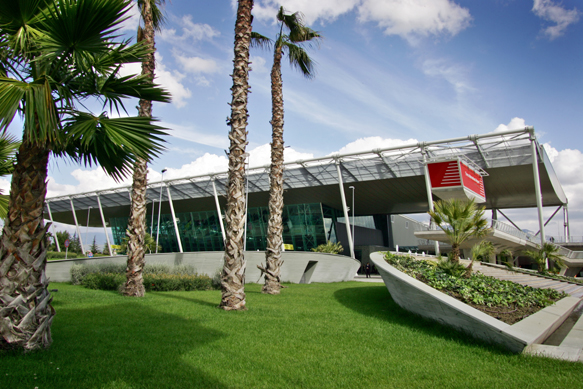
The terminal of Nënë Tereza International Airport

==== Air ====
Tirana is served by Nënë Tereza International Airport, which is the main air gateway to the country. The airport was officially named in honour of the Albanian Roman Catholic nun and missionary, Mother Teresa. It connects Tirana with destinations across Europe, Africa, and Asia. The airport carried more than 3.3 million passengers in 2019.

==== Road ====
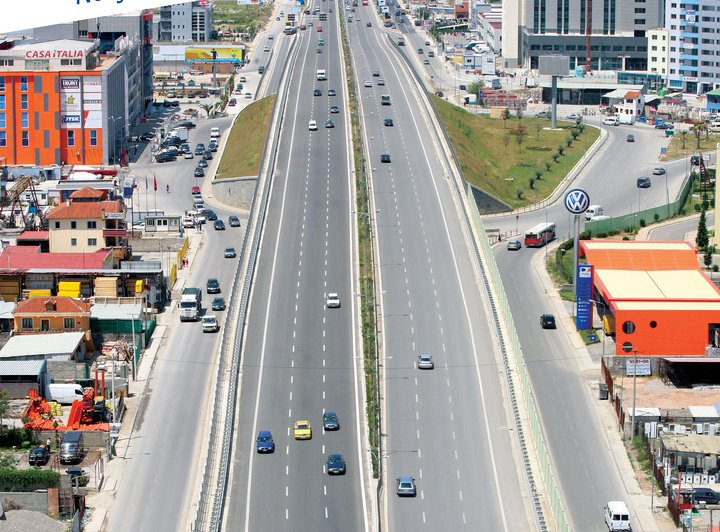
The Rruga Shtetërore 2 (SH2) connecting Tirana with Durrës

Tirana's geographical location in the centre of Albania has long established the city as the core terminus for the national road network, thus connecting the city to all parts of Albania and neighbouring countries. The Rruga Shtetërore 1 (SH1) connects Tirana with Shkodër and Montenegro in the north, and constitutes a key section of the proposed Adriatic–Ionian motorway. The Rruga Shtetërore 2 (SH2) continues in the west and provides direct connection to Durrës on the Adriatic Sea. The Rruga Shtetërore 3 (SH3) is being transformed into the Autostrada 3 (A3) and follows the ancient Via Egnatia. It is a significant section of the Pan-European Corridor VIII and links the city with Elbasan, Korçë and Greece in the south. Tirana is further connected, through the Milot interchange in the northwest, with Kosovo as part of the Autostrada 1 (A1).

During the communist regime in Albania, a plan for the construction of a ring road around Tirana arose in 1989 but implementation was delayed until the 2010s. It is of major importance, especially concerning demographic growth of the Tirana region as well as the Albanian economy. Although, constructions for the now completed southern section of the ring road started in 2011, the northern and eastern sections are still in the planning process.

==== Rail ====
Rail lines of Hekurudha Shqiptare (HSH) connected Tirana with all of the major cities of Albania, including Durrës, Shkodër and Vlorë. In 2013, the Tirana Railway Station was closed and moved to Kashar by the city government in order to create space for the New Boulevard (Albanian: Bulevardi i Ri) project. The new Tirana Station will be constructed in Laprakë, which is projected to be a multifunctional terminal for rail, tram and bus transportation. City officials have discussed a light rail extension to the location of the former rail station. Construction is underway on a new rail line from Tirana to Nënë Tereza International Airport and Durrës.

In 2012, the Tirana municipality published a report that construction of two tram lines was under evaluation. The tram lines would have a total length of 16.7 kilometres (10.4 miles). That plan was never implemented. Under the plan, the two tram lines would have intersected in Skanderbeg Square. Public transport in Tirana is, for now, focused only in the city centre, people living in the suburbs have fewer or no public transport connections.

==== Bus ====
Tirana's bus network is its primary and only system of public transport. The system has 16 lines serving the urban core, with another 14 suburban lines serving its outer regions. The urban network is made up of 8 radial lines, 5 diagonal lines, and 3 circular or semi-circular lines.

Busses often get stuck in traffic. There were only 7 kilometres (4.3 miles) of dedicated bus lines in 2020.

There were 451 bus stops on the entire urban network in 2020, extending to over 170 kilometres (110 miles). Services operate every day, regardless of holidays and weekends, from 06:00 to 24:00. The entire network had an average headway of 9 minutes on a daily basis in 2018 and in the first half of 2019.

Nearly 257,000 residents lived within a 150 m (490 ft) walking area from a bus stop when surveyed in Tirana’s strategic transport study in 2019. That was approximately 35% of the population living inside the Municipal unit of Tirana.

A single-ride ticket costs 40 Lek, and no hourly or daily options are available. Disabled people and veterans may ride for free. An electronic ticketing system is under implementation.

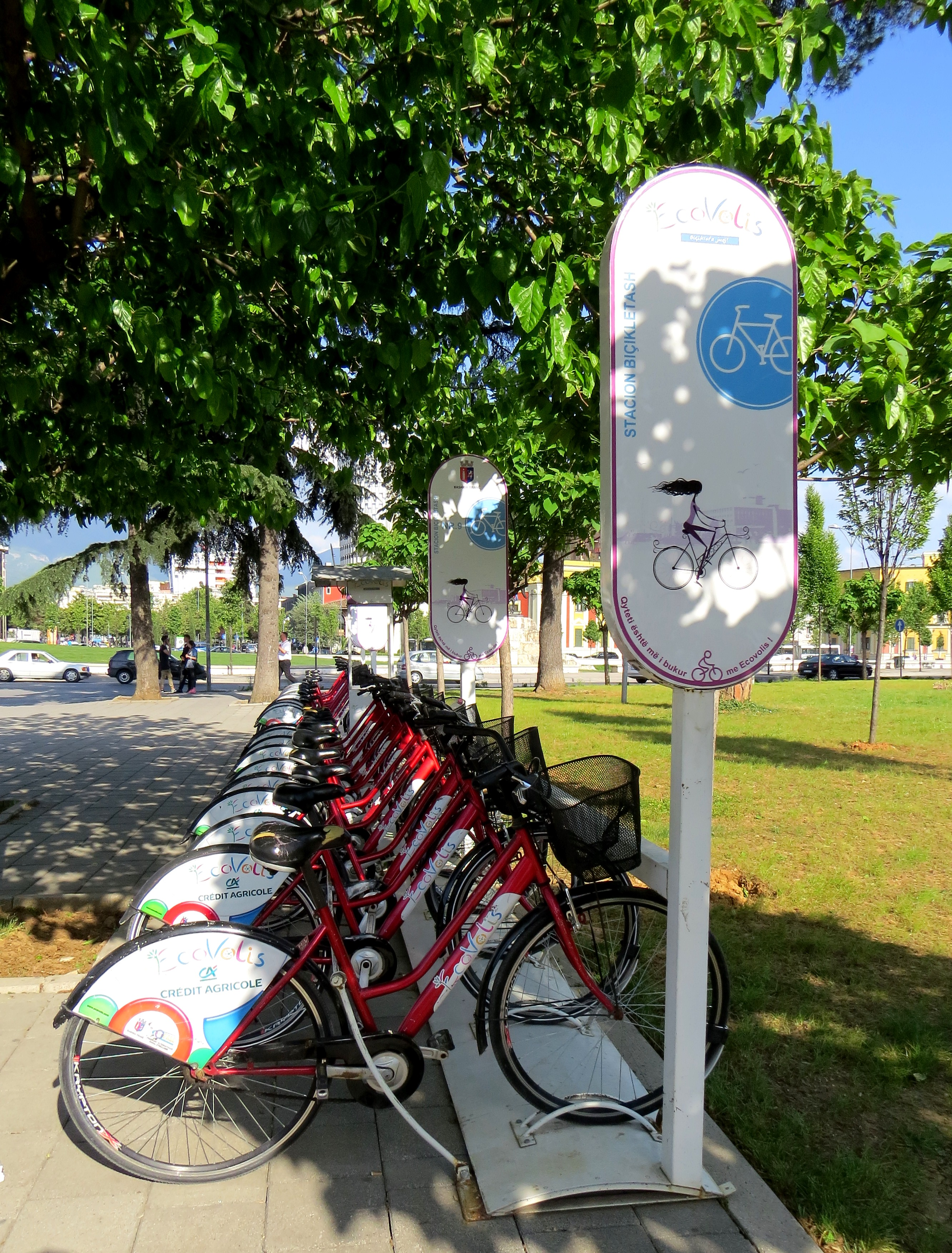
An Ecovolis station near Mother Teresa Square

==== Cycling ====
During the administration of mayor Erion Veliaj, the government of Tirana has significantly increased the creation and expansion of a cycling infrastructure in the city in order to reduce traffic congestion as well as to improve the sustainable transportation. Ecovolis was launched in 2011 offering rental services for bicycles at different centrally located stations for a small fee. The international bicycle sharing system, Mobike, launched its operations on 8 June 2018 by deploying 4000 bicycles in the city. Both services were discontinued.

Safe cycling paths are still relatively rare, despite improvements in recent years. Paths are often blocked by parked cars or construction. Other obstructions which decrease ride quality, such as drain holes, are also prevalent. There were only around 30 kilometres (19 miles) of cycling routes in 2020.

=== Education ===
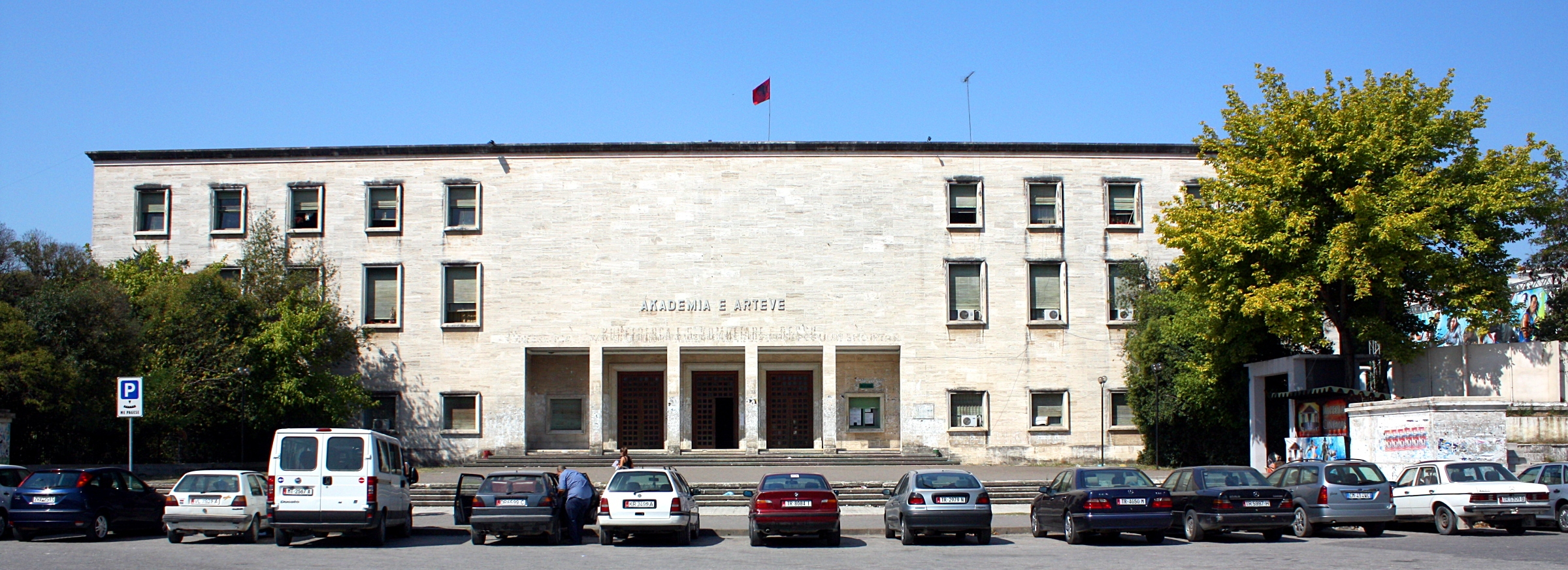
The University of Arts at Mother Teresa Square

Tirana has the highest concentration of institutions of tertiary education in Albania, consisting of numerous academies, colleges and universities. Most prominent among these is the University of Tirana with campuses around the city and more than 28,000 students from all backgrounds. The Polytechnic University of Tirana is another distinguished institution and also the most renowned engineering and technical university in the country. The four other public institutions in Tirana are the University of Arts, University of Agriculture, University of Medicine and University of Sports.

The educational system of Tirana has expanded substantially over the past years with the renovations of existing school facilities and the construction of new schools. For primary and secondary education, a variety of schools are available, tagged with the public, private and international labels. Some of the international schools are the Tirana International School, Albanian International School, British School, Montessori School, Memorial School and World Academy. The public primary and secondary Servete Maçi School won an award at the 2020 International Architecture Awards.

=== Health ===
There are numerous public and private hospitals as well as smaller public and private health care facilities in the territory of Tirana. The Mother Teresa University Hospital is one of the largest medical tertiary institutions of the country. Other medical institutions include the Shefqet Ndroqi University Hospital, Koço Gliozheni Hospital, Mbretëresha Gjeraldinë Hospital and the Military Hospital.

== Demographics ==
Historical population
Year	Pop.	±%
1703	4,000	—
1820	12,000	+200.0%
1923	10,845	−9.6%
1937	35,000	+222.7%
1950	51,383	+46.8%
1960	136,295	+165.3%
1969	152,700	+12.0%
1979	189,000	+23.8%
1989	238,057	+26.0%
2001	341,453	+43.4%
2011	418,495	+22.6%
2023	389,323	−7.0%

According to the 2023 census, the municipality of Tirana had 598,176 residents, of whom 583,963 were born in Albania and 14,213 abroad. With a population density of 502 people per square kilometre, Tirana is the most densely populated municipality in the country. The encompassing metropolitan area, consisting of the regions of Durrës and Tirana, has a combined population of approximately 1 million, amounting to nearly one third of the country's total population.

Historically, Tirana has experienced a steady population increase, especially after the fall of communism in the late twentieth century as well as the beginning of the twenty-first century. The remarkable growth was, and still is, largely fuelled by migrants from all over the country, often in search of employment and improved living conditions. Between 1820 and 1955, the population of Tirana tenfolded, while during the period from 1989 to 2011 the city's population grew annually by approximately 2.7%. In the 19th and 20th centuries, the city had a rate of growth of less than 1% annually until the 1970s, then down to less than 8% per year until the middle 20th century figures.

Among residents born in Albania, the majority were born in Tirana itself (310,084), but the municipality has long been the principal internal migration destination in the country. Large communities trace their birthplace to Dibër (38,612), Korçë (35,667), Fier (30,290), Berat (30,254), Kukës (27,246), Elbasan (26,258) and Gjirokastër (25,885), with additional groups from Shkodër (18,226), Vlorë (15,599), Durrës (14,371) and Lezhë (11,471). The inflows from north-eastern mountainous prefectures such as Dibër and Kukës, from the south-eastern and southern interior around Korçë, Berat, Gjirokastër and Elbasan, and from coastal areas including Durrës, Vlorë and Lezhë illustrate a predominantly rural-to-urban and intra-regional migration pattern oriented toward the capital. These movements intensified after the early 1990s, when internal mobility restrictions were lifted, and include both long-distance migration from remote highland municipalities and short-distance relocation within central Albania. The resulting settlement pattern combines older urban neighbourhoods with rapidly urbanised former rural areas on the city’s outskirts and along main transport corridors. This wide geographic spread reflects the city’s dominant role as Albania’s administrative, educational and economic centre and has contributed to its rapid demographic expansion and increasing social diversity since the early 1990s.

According to the 2023 Population and Housing Census profile for Tirana County, the population is predominantly of Albanian ethnicity (91.0%), followed by small minorities of Greeks (0.26%), Aromanians (Vlachs) (0.10%), Macedonians (0.06%), Montenegrins (0.03%), Roma (0.22%), Egyptians (0.13%), Bosniaks, Serbs, Bulgarians and Italians (each below 0.05%). About 8% of residents did not declare or provided no ethnic affiliation. The majority of inhabitants reported Albanian as their mother tongue (94.7%), with smaller proportions declaring Greek (0.4%), Aromanian (0.2%), or other and multiple languages (1.1%).

The life expectancy at birth in Tirana is 82.8 years, 84.5 years for women and 81 years for men, exceeding that of wealthier capital cities in Western Europe such as Vienna and Berlin.

=== Religion in Tirana ===
Religion in Tirana County, 2023
Islam	48.67%
Bektashism	4.94%
Catholicism	4.66%
Orthodoxy	5.01%
Evangelical/other Christians	0.75%
Atheists	3.65%
Believers without religion/denomination	15.54%
Not stated / other	16.70%

In Albania, a secular state with no state religion, the freedom of belief, conscience and religion is explicitly guaranteed in the constitution of Albania. Tirana is religiously diverse and has many places of worship catering to its religious population whom are adherents of Islam, Christianity and Judaism but also of Atheism and Agnosticism. They all maintain their Albanian headquarters spread across the territory of Tirana. Nevertheless, the Bektashi Order leadership established their world centre also in the city.

Religious affiliation in the administrative units of urban Tirana (2011 Census)
Administrative unit	Neighbourhoods	Muslims (%)	Bektashi (%)	Catholics (%)	Orthodox (%)	Other Christians (%)	Unaffiliated believers (%)^{†}	Atheists (%)	No response / other (%)^{‡}
Tirana 1	Ali Demi	60.81%	3.26%	4.31%	6.60%	0.47%	3.62%	3.22%	17.72%
Tirana 2	Bulevardi Bajram Curri, Bulevardi Zhan D'Ark, Qyteti Studenti, Sauku, Zona 1	49.44%	2.73%	5.09%	8.70%	0.61%	4.46%	4.40%	24.57%
Tirana 3	Brryli, Xhamlliku	55.26%	3.37%	4.21%	7.07%	0.39%	5.56%	4.17%	19.98%
Tirana 4	Kinostudio, Babrru, Allias	57.17%	3.46%	6.97%	5.00%	0.55%	4.70%	2.94%	19.22%
Tirana 5	Blloku, Selita, Tirana e Re	34.71%	4.50%	5.55%	13.40%	0.59%	5.72%	7.06%	28.47%
Tirana 6	Kombinati, Yzberisht	57.93%	6.41%	4.18%	3.77%	0.30%	5.88%	2.55%	18.98%
Tirana 7	21 Dhjetori, Ish-Fusha e Aviacionit	47.84%	4.21%	6.01%	10.92%	0.50%	5.35%	5.37%	19.80%
Tirana 8	Selvia, Medreseja e Tiranës	58.06%	2.56%	6.54%	6.92%	0.55%	4.64%	4.16%	16.57%
Tirana 9	Lagja e Trenit, Brraka, Don Bosko (part)	52.44%	2.81%	5.46%	7.65%	0.49%	4.75%	4.36%	22.05%
Tirana 10	Central Tirana	39.87%	3.11%	4.71%	14.80%	0.43%	6.50%	6.95%	23.62%
Tirana 11	Lapraka, Instituti, Don Bosko (part)	57.17%	2.43%	12.56%	2.57%	0.26%	3.98%	1.46%	19.57%
Urban Tirana	–	51.57%	3.55%	6.13%	7.83%	0.48%	4.95%	4.19%	21.31%

Notes

- ^{†} Unaffiliated believers: corresponds to the Census category “I don’t belong to any religion, but I am a believer”, as defined in the 2011 Population and Housing Census of Albania.
- ^{‡} No response / other: includes respondents who selected “other”, “prefer not to answer”, or whose response was recorded as invalid/undetermined.
- Data by administrative unit are based on detailed tabulations of religious affiliation from the 2011 Population and Housing Census of Albania for the 11 administrative units of Tirana, provided by the Albanian Institute of Statistics (INSTAT) to the NGO “Res Publica”.

In the 2011 census, 55.7% of the population of the municipality of Tirana was counted as Muslim, 3.4% as Bektashis and 11.8% as Christian including 5.4% as Roman Catholic and 6.4% as Eastern Orthodox. The remaining 29.1% of the population reported having no religion or did not provide an adequate answer. The 2023 census did not publish municipality level religious statistics for Tirana. County level results for Tirana County, where the municipality accounts for the clear majority of residents (598,176 out of 758,513, 78.86%), reported the following composition: 48.67% Islam (Sunni or non denominational), 4.94% Bektashi, 5.01% Orthodox, 4.66% Catholic, 0.75% Evangelical or other Christians, 3.65% atheists, 15.54% believers without a religion/denomination, and 16.70% not stated or other.

The Roman Catholic Church is represented in Tirana by the Archdiocese of Tiranë and Durrës, with the St Paul's Cathedral as the seat of the prelacy. The Albanian Orthodox community is served by the Archbishop of Tirana in the Resurrection Cathedral.

Religious buildings in Tirana

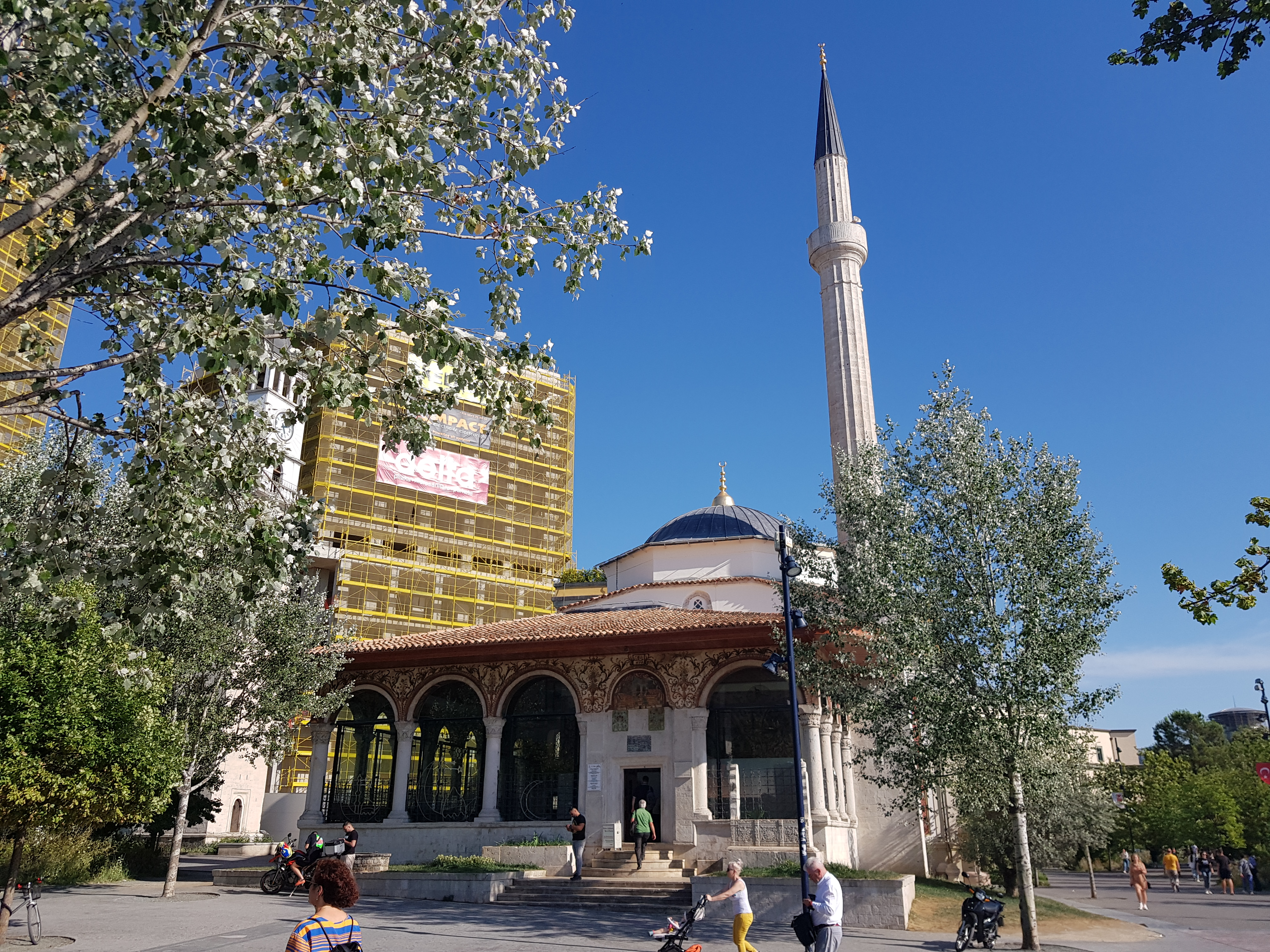
Et'hem Bey Mosque

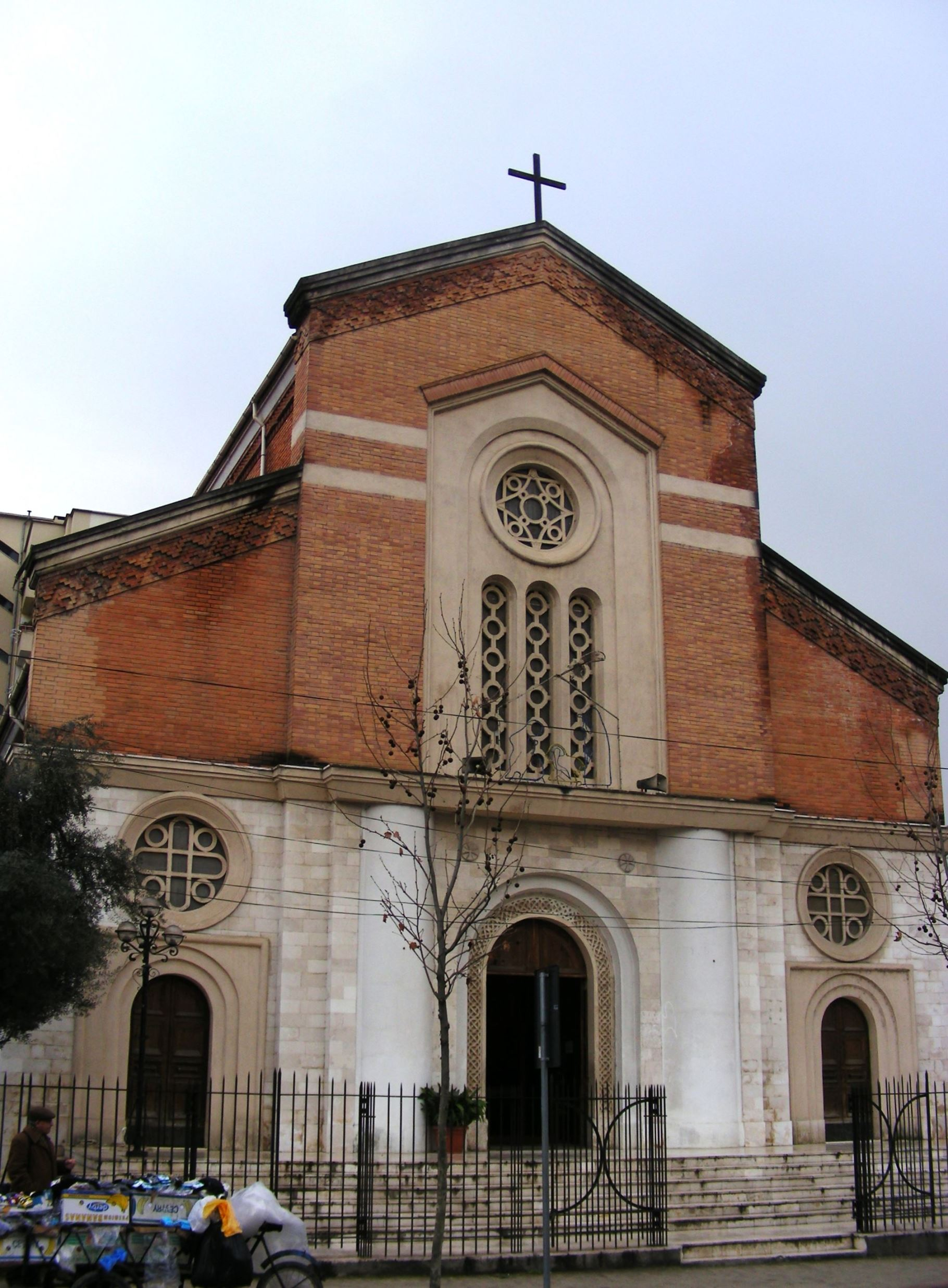
Sacred Heart Church

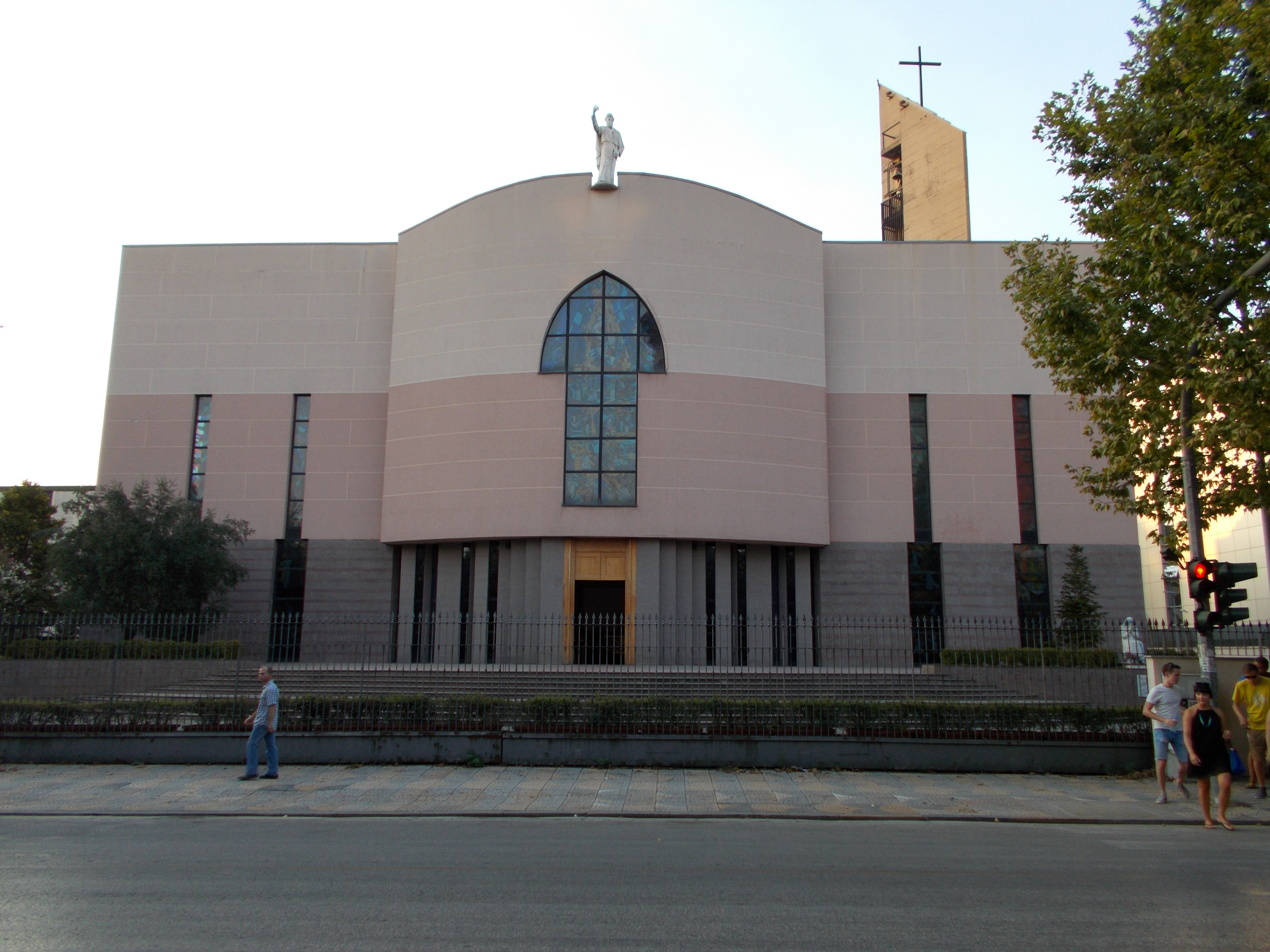
St. Paul's Cathedral

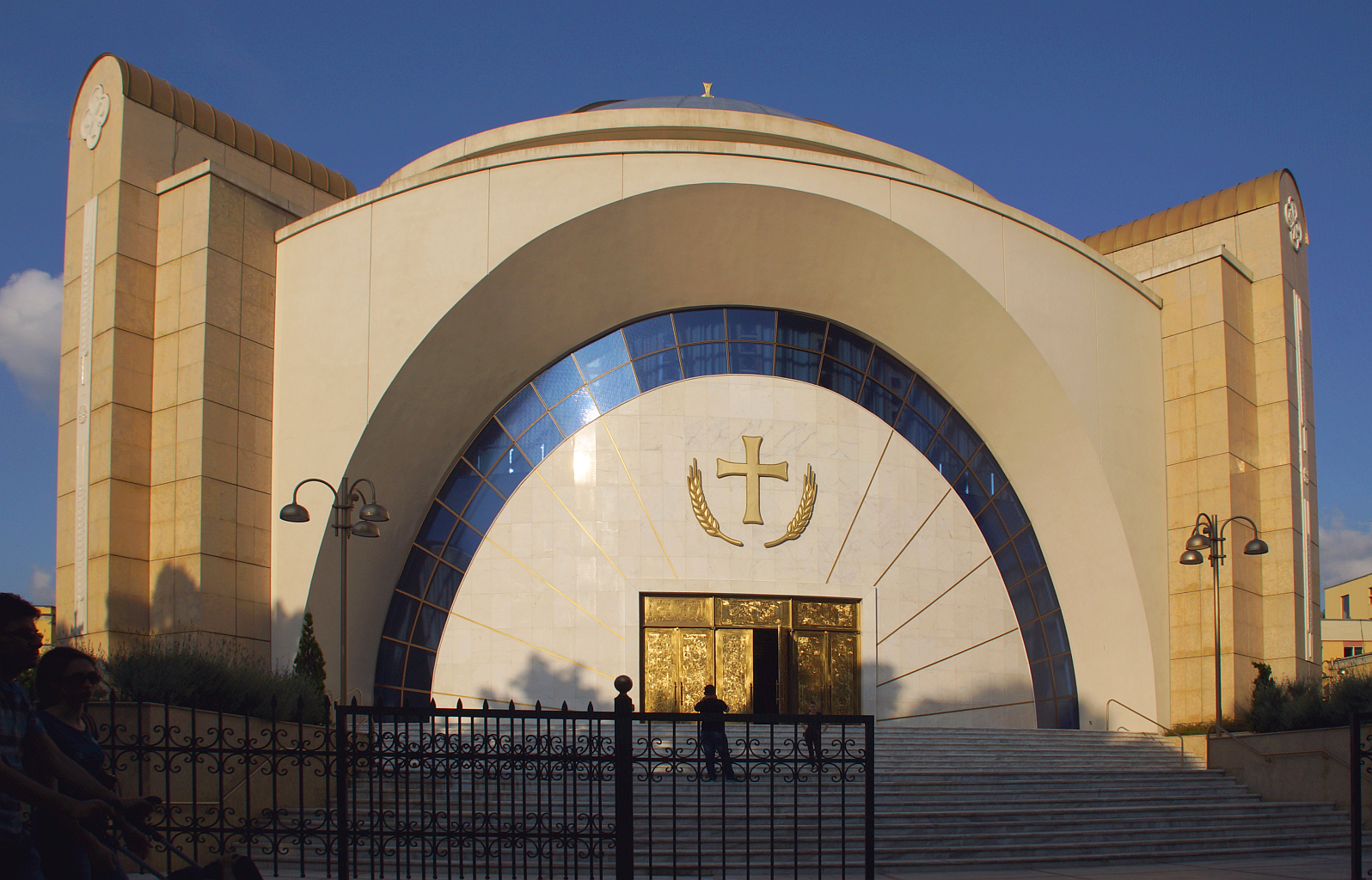
Resurrection Cathedral

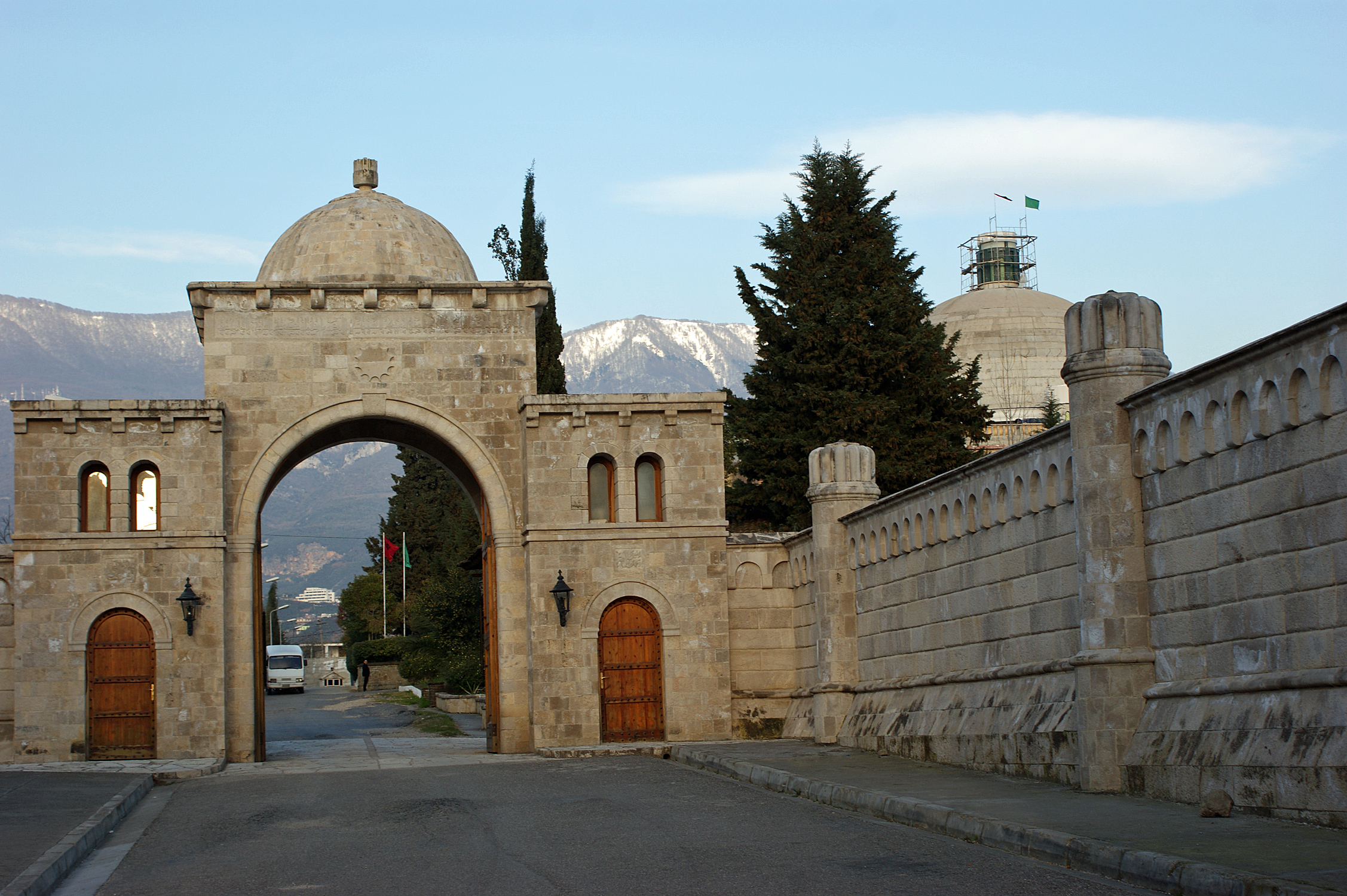
Bektashi World Center

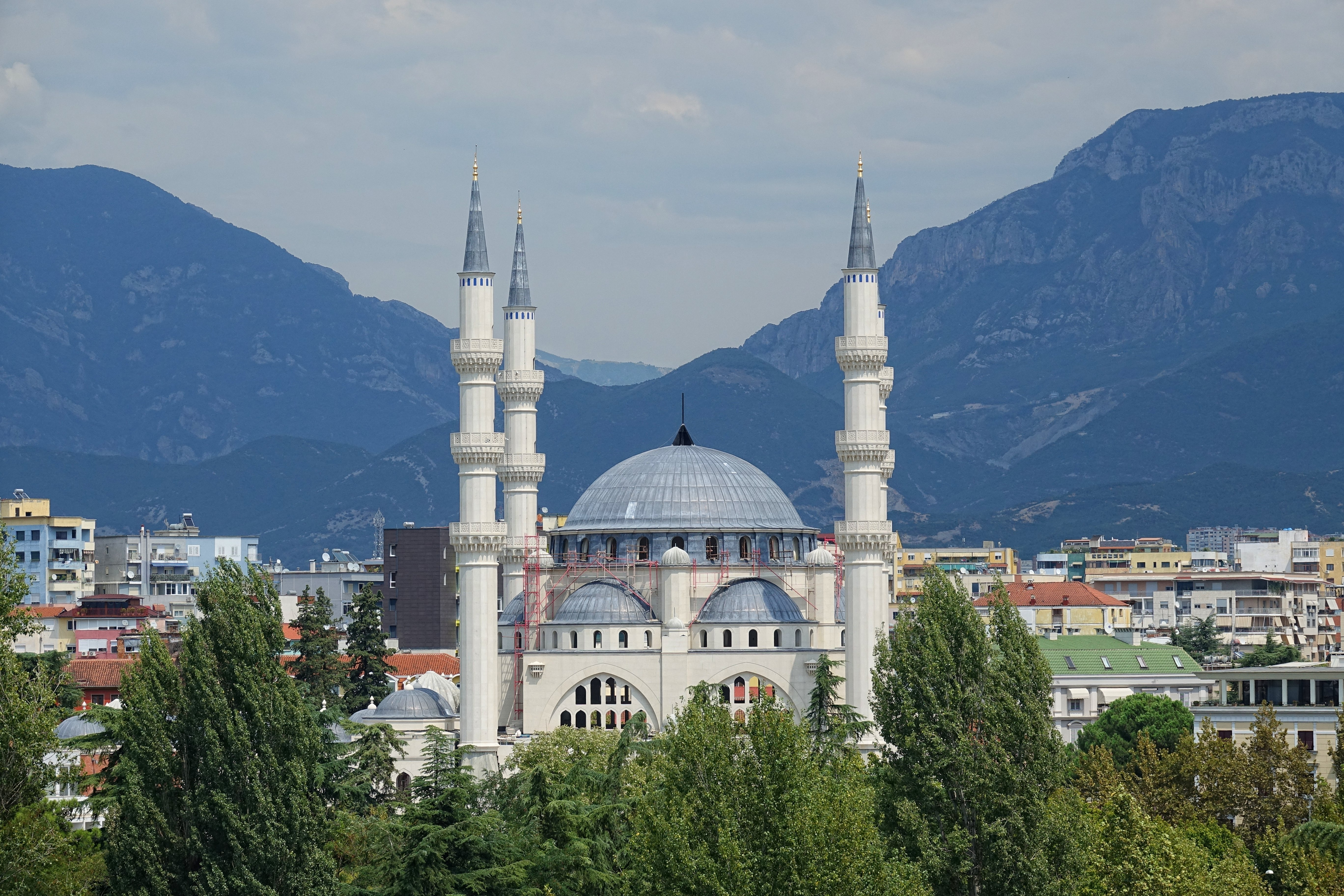
Namazgah Mosque

== Culture ==
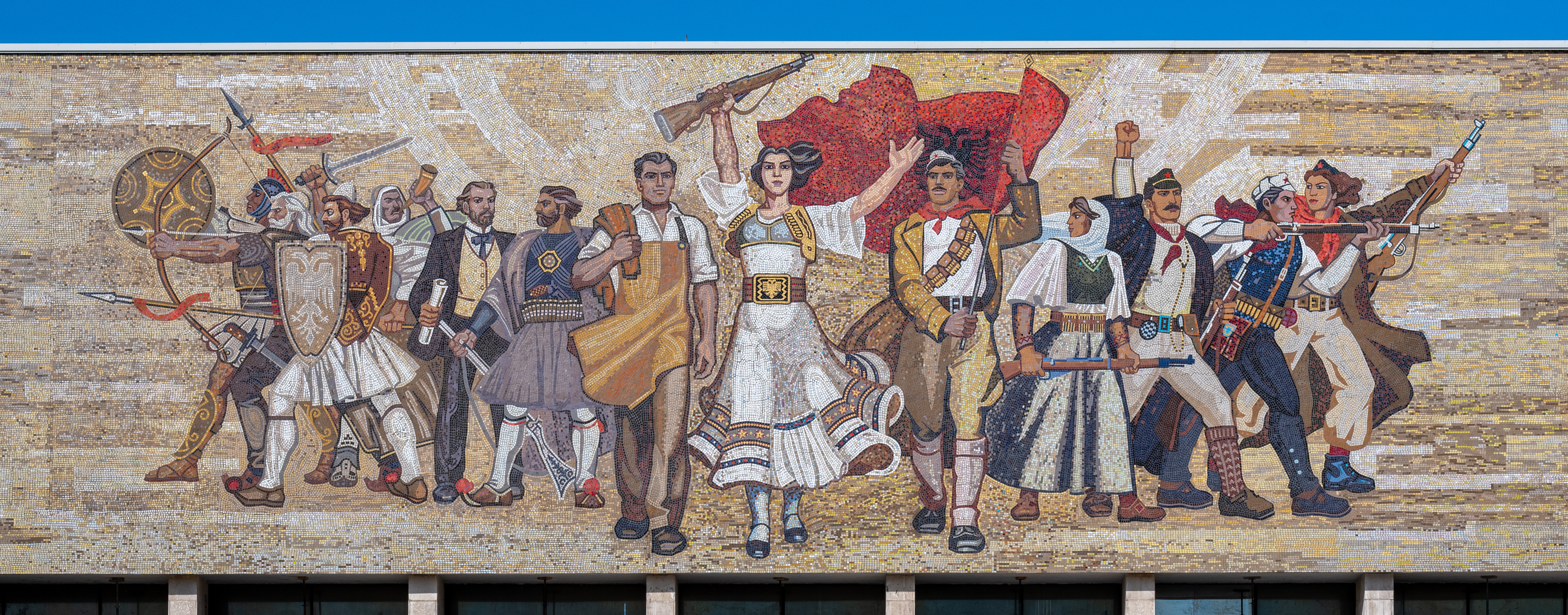
Panorama of The Albanians History mosaic above the entrance of the National History Museum

Tirana offers a blend of traditional and modern lifestyle with a variety of arts, food, entertainment, music and night life. Its population celebrates a wide range of religious and other festivals including Christmas, Eid, Hanukkah and Nowruz. Another festival is Dita e Verës taking place every year on 14 March, during which the Albanians celebrate the end of winter and the arrival of spring.

Among the local institutions are the National Library, that keeps more than a million books, periodicals, maps, atlases, microfilms and other library materials. The city has five well-preserved traditional houses (museum-houses), 56 cultural monuments, eight public libraries.

There are many domestic and foreign cultural institutions in Tirana, amongst them the British Council, Canadian Institute of Technology as well as the German Goethe-Institut and Friedrich Ebert Foundation. Other cultural institutions include the Chinese Confucius Institute, Greek Hellenic Foundation for Culture, Italian Istituto Italiano di Cultura and the French Alliance Française.

=== Architecture ===
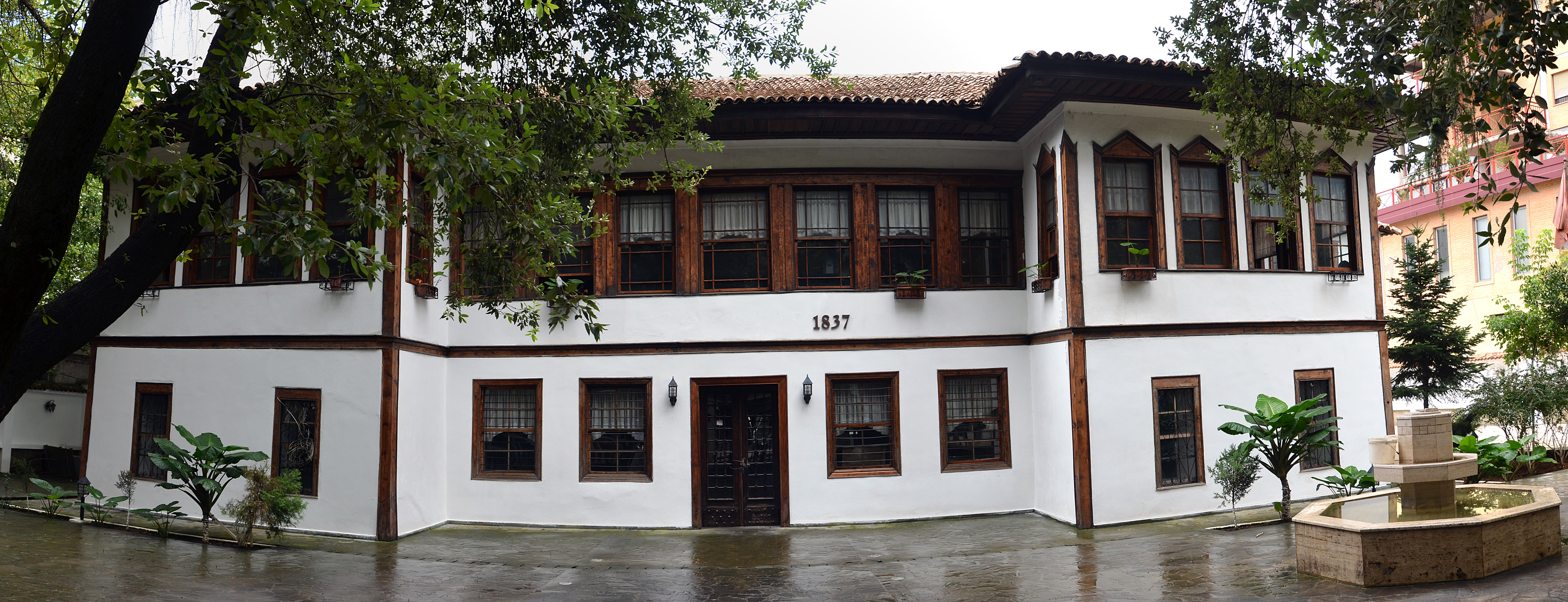
The Toptani house from the 18th century

Tirana is home to a mixture of architectural styles reflecting the influential periods in its history. Its current appearance was considerably shaped by two totalitarian regimes, once by the fascist regime of Benito Mussolini during the Second World War and the regime of Enver Hoxha in the aftermath. The Palace of Brigades, the ministries buildings, the government building and the municipality hall are designed by Florestano Di Fausto and Armando Brasini, both well-known architects of the Mussolini period in Italy. The Dëshmorët e Kombit Boulevard was built in 1930 and given the name King Zog I Boulevard.

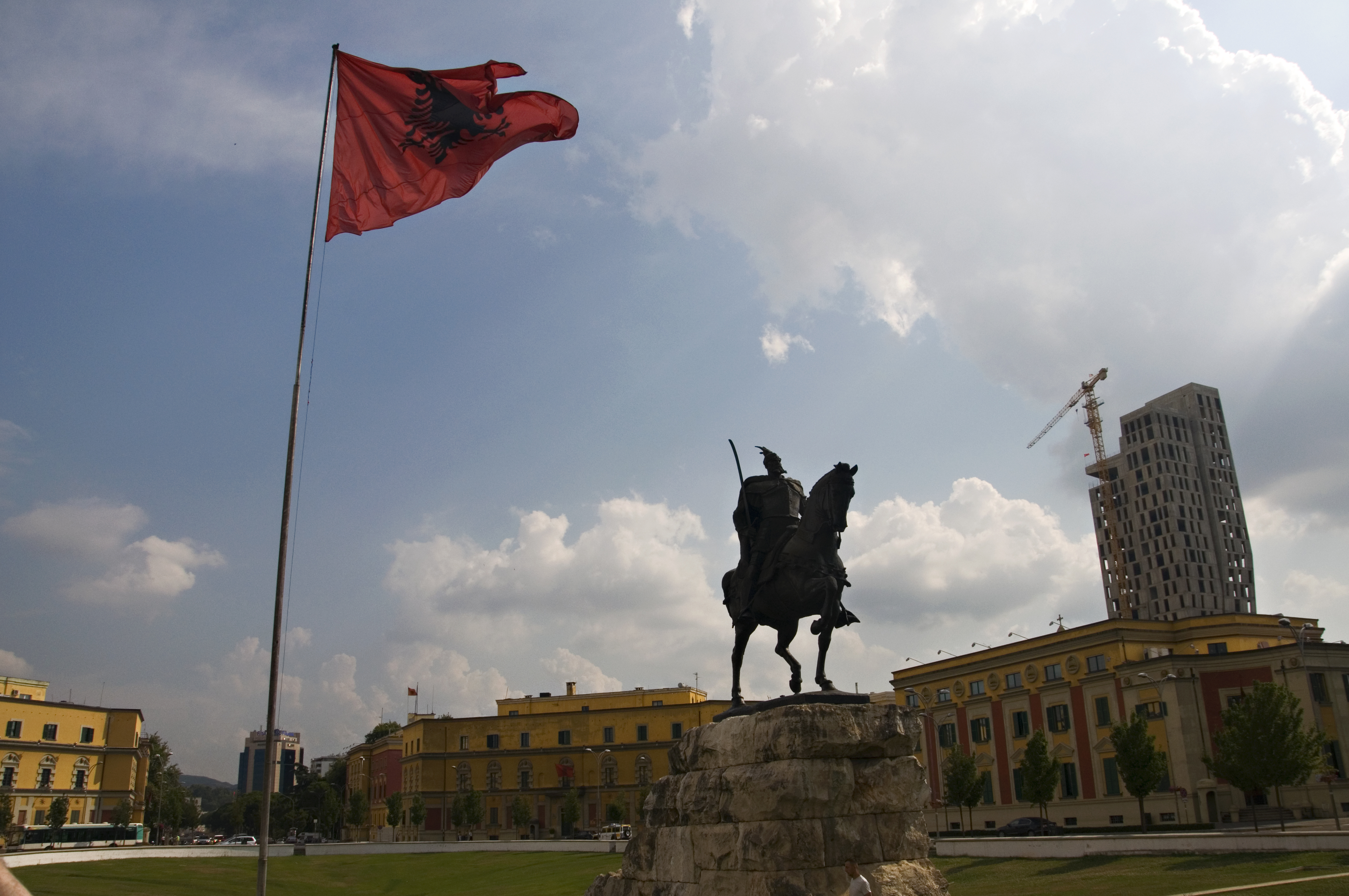
Florestano Di Fausto and Armando Brasini designed the city plan for Tirana in Neo-Renaissance style with articulate angular solutions and giant order fascias.

In the 20th century, the part from Skanderbeg Square up to the train station was named Stalin Boulevard. The Royal Palace or Palace of Brigades previously served as the official residence of King Zog I. It has been used by different Albanian governments for various purposes. Because of the outbreak of World War II, and the 1939 Italian invasion of Albania, Zog I fled Albania and never had a chance to see the Palace fully constructed. The Italians finished it and used it as the Army Headquarters. The Palace took its nickname Palace of Brigades because it was taken from the Italians by a people's army brigade.

In the 21st century, Tirana turned into a proper modernist city, with large blocks of flats, modern new buildings, new shopping centres and many green spaces. In June 2016, the Mayor of Tirana Erion Veliaj and the Italian architect Stefano Boeri announced the start of the works for the redaction of the Master Plan Tirana 2030.

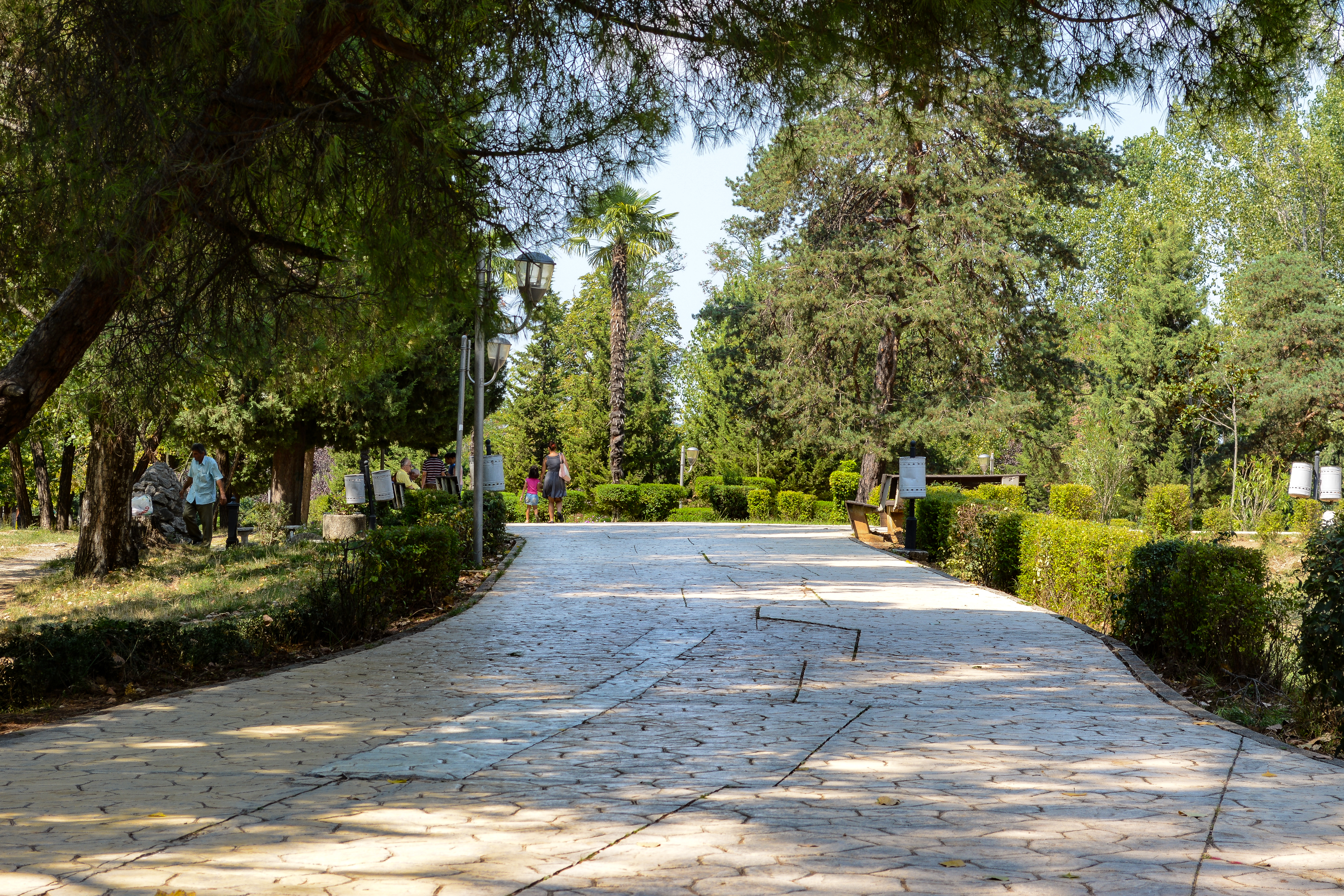
The entrance of the Grand Park of Tirana

Tirana is a densely-built area and still offers several public parks throughout its districts, graced with green gardens. The Grand Park is the most important green space in Tirana. It is one of the most visited areas by local citizens. The park includes many children's playgrounds, sport facilities and landmarks such as the Saint Procopius Church, the Presidential Palace, the Botanical Gardens, the Tirana Zoo, the Amphitheatre, the Monument of the Frashëri Brothers and many others.

The Rinia Park was built during the Communist era. It bordered by Dëshmorët e Kombit Boulevard to the east, Gjergi Fishta Boulevard and Bajram Curri Boulevard to the south, Rruga Ibrahim Rugova to the west and Rruga Myslym Shyri to the north. The Taivani Centre is the main landmark in the park and houses cafés, restaurants, fountains, and a bowling lane in the basement. The Summer Festival takes place every year in the park, to celebrate the end of winter and the rebirth of nature and a rejuvenation of spirit amongst the Albanians.

As of 2020, it was announced that the Municipality of Tirana will build more green spaces and will plant more trees.

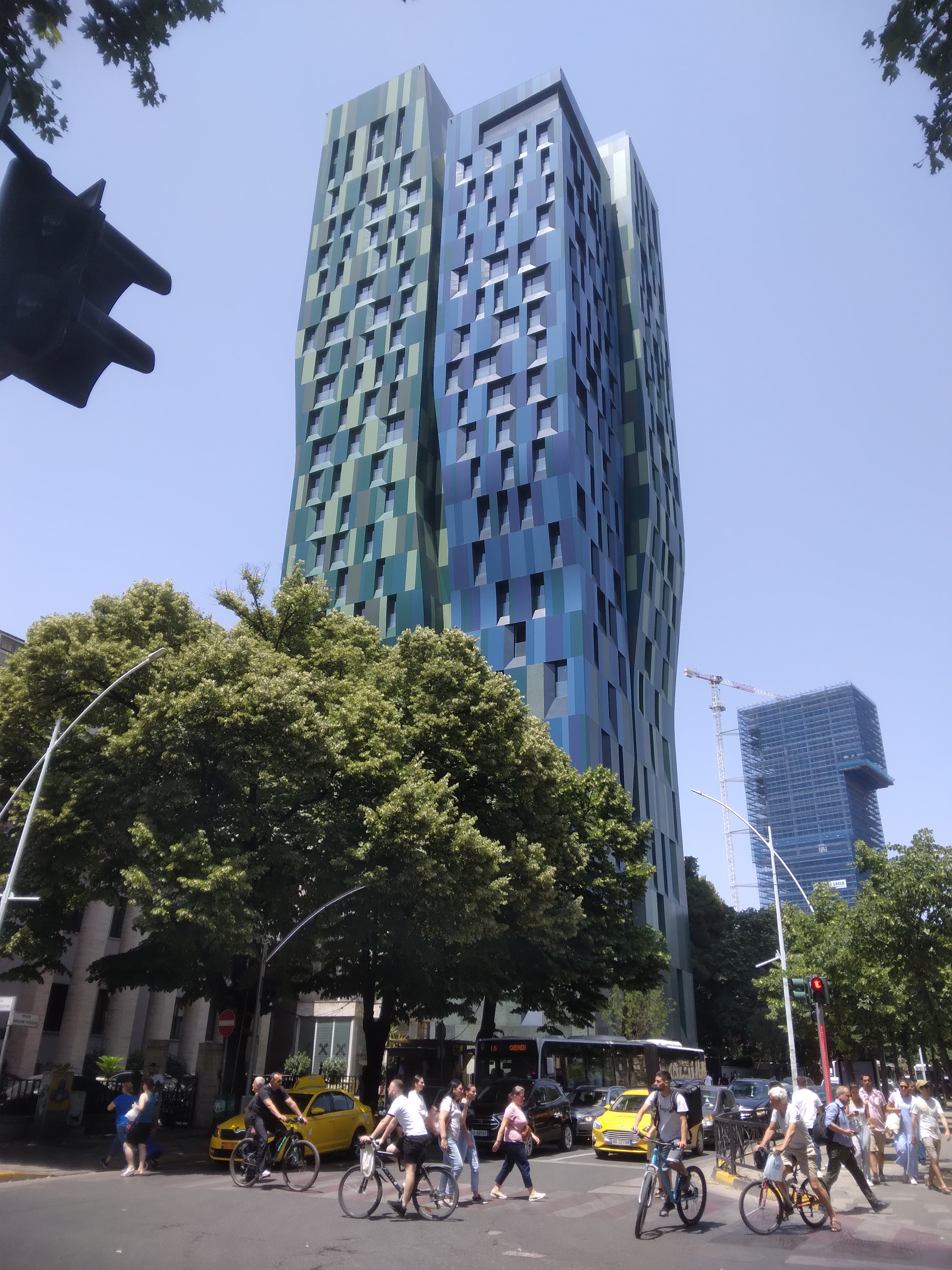
The Alban Tower, designed by Archea Associati (Italy), completed in 2021

=== Museums ===
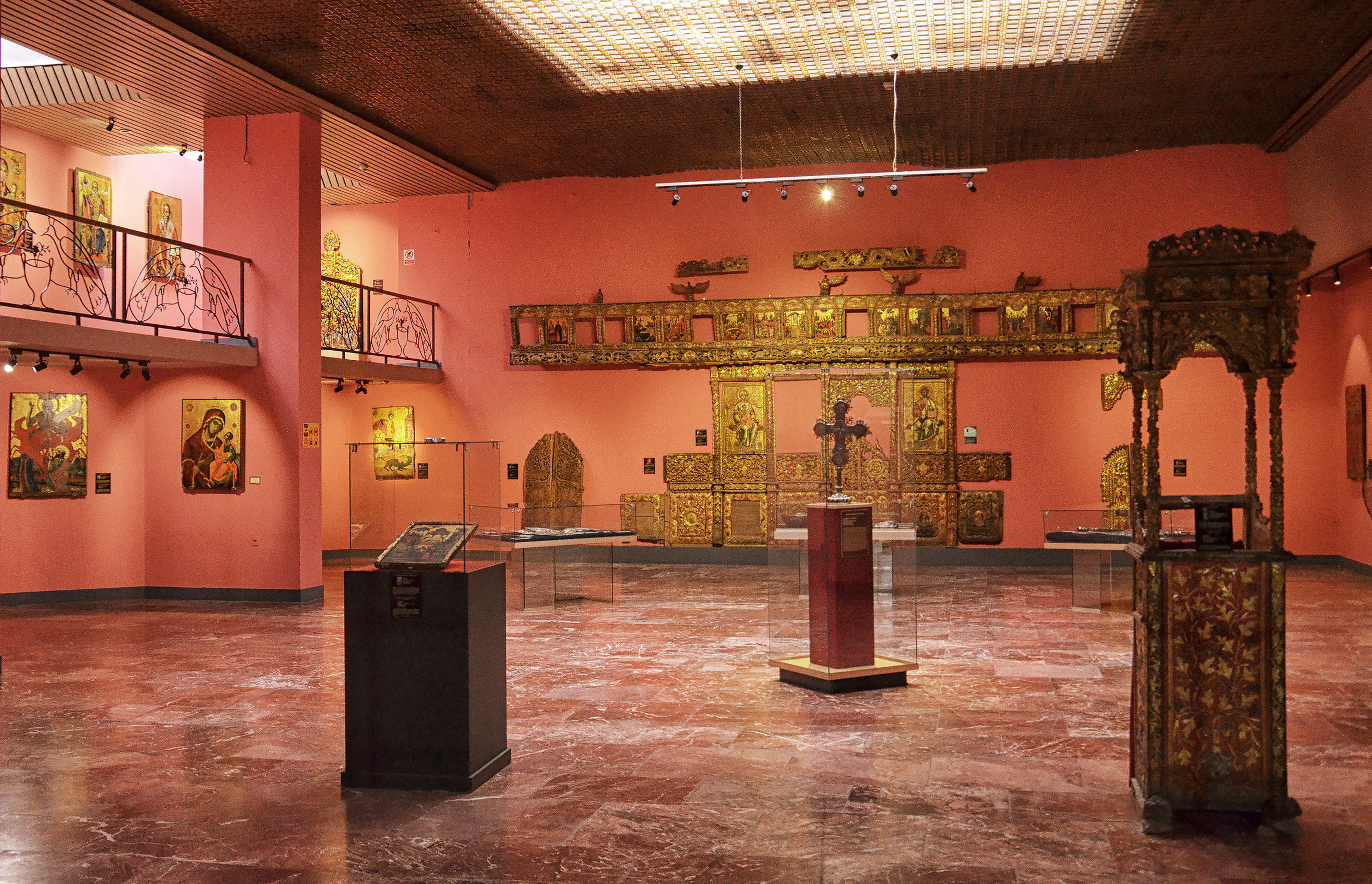
The National History Museum at the Skanderbeg Square

Tirana is the home to a number of museums dedicated to a wide array of arts. The National History Museum is located at the Skanderbeg Square and the most representative museum of Tirana. The mosaic above the entrance is the most dominant feature of the museum displaying the story of how the Albanian people have fought against invasion and occupation throughout history.

Founded in 1948, the National Museum of Archaeology at the Mother Teresa Square displays a wide collection of research and discoveries belonging to the archaeological locations around Albania. Its exhibits span from prehistory through antiquity and the Middle Ages to the twentieth century, offering an overview of the country's historical diversity.

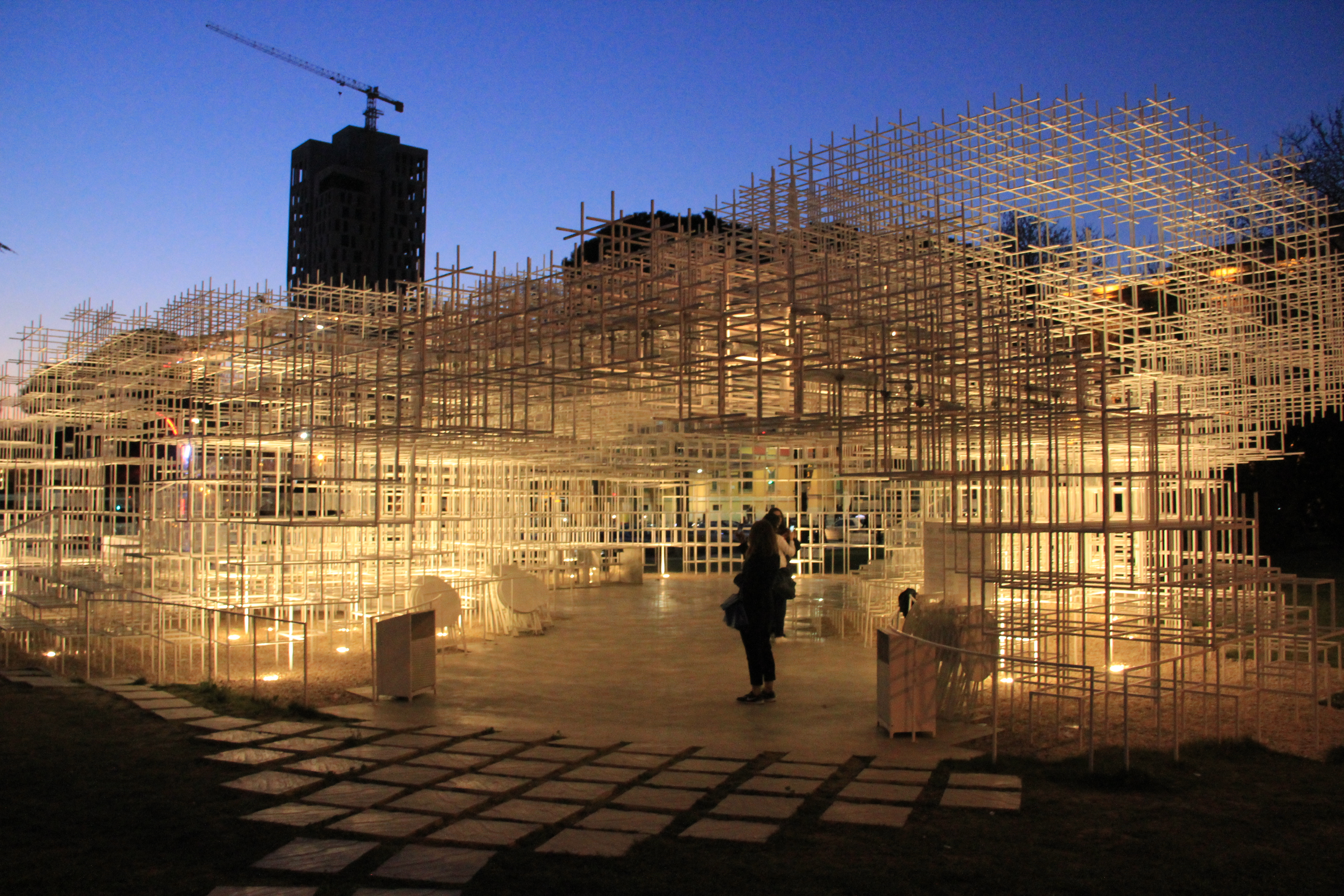
The Cloud Pavilion outside the National Art Gallery installed by Japanese artist Sou Fujimoto

The National Art Gallery is considered the most important gallery in Albania housing one of the greatest collections of paintings in the region. Located at the Dëshmorët e Kombit Boulevard, it holds approximately 4.500 works of art including the most important collection of Albanian art of the nineteenth and twentieth centuries.

The Bunk'art Museum consists of two underground bunkers built under the orders and direction of Hoxha during the communist era. Located at the Fadil Deliu Street and Abdi Toptani Street respectively, the bunkers have been transformed into a history museum and contemporary art gallery with exhibits from the Second World War and Cold War.

The Museum of Secret Surveillance was founded in 2017 and is housed within a twentieth century mansion, the building known as the House of Leaves, near the Dëshmorët e Kombit Boulevard. It commemorates and honours the victims who fell to the communist terrorism and violence during the communist period in Albania. Other museums include the Natural Sciences Museum, which has branches in zoology, botany and geology, the former Enver Hoxha Museum and the Bunk'art Museum.

The Bektashi Museum was opened at the World Headquarters of the Bektashi on 7 September 2015. The museum contains exhibits relating to Bektashi history and leadership.

=== Cuisine ===
As in other parts of Albania, agricultural traditions are of great significance to the Albanians in Tirana, substantially appreciated for the production of food such as cheese, olives and wine. In 2016, Albania surpassed Spain by becoming the country with the most coffee houses per capita in the world with 654 coffee houses per 100,000 inhabitants. This is due to coffee houses closing down in Spain due to the economic crisis, and the fact that as many cafes open as they close in Albania. In addition, the fact that it was one of the easiest ways to make a living after the fall of communism in Albania, together with the country's Ottoman legacy further reinforce its strong dominance in Albania.

The Tirana region is known for the Fergesa traditional dish made with either peppers or liver, and is found at a number of traditional restaurants in the city and agri-tourism sites on the outskirts of Tirana.

=== Sports ===
Being the capital, Tirana is the centre of sport in Albania, where activity is organised across amateur and professional levels. It is home to many major sporting facilities. Starting from 2007, the Tirana Municipality has built up to 80 sport gardens in most of Tirana's neighborhoods. One of the latest projects is the reconstruction of the existing Olympic Park, that will provide infrastructure for most intramural sports.

Tirana hosted in the past three major events, the 2006 European Promotion Cup for Men, 2011 World Mountain Running Championships and the 2013 European Weightlifting Championships.

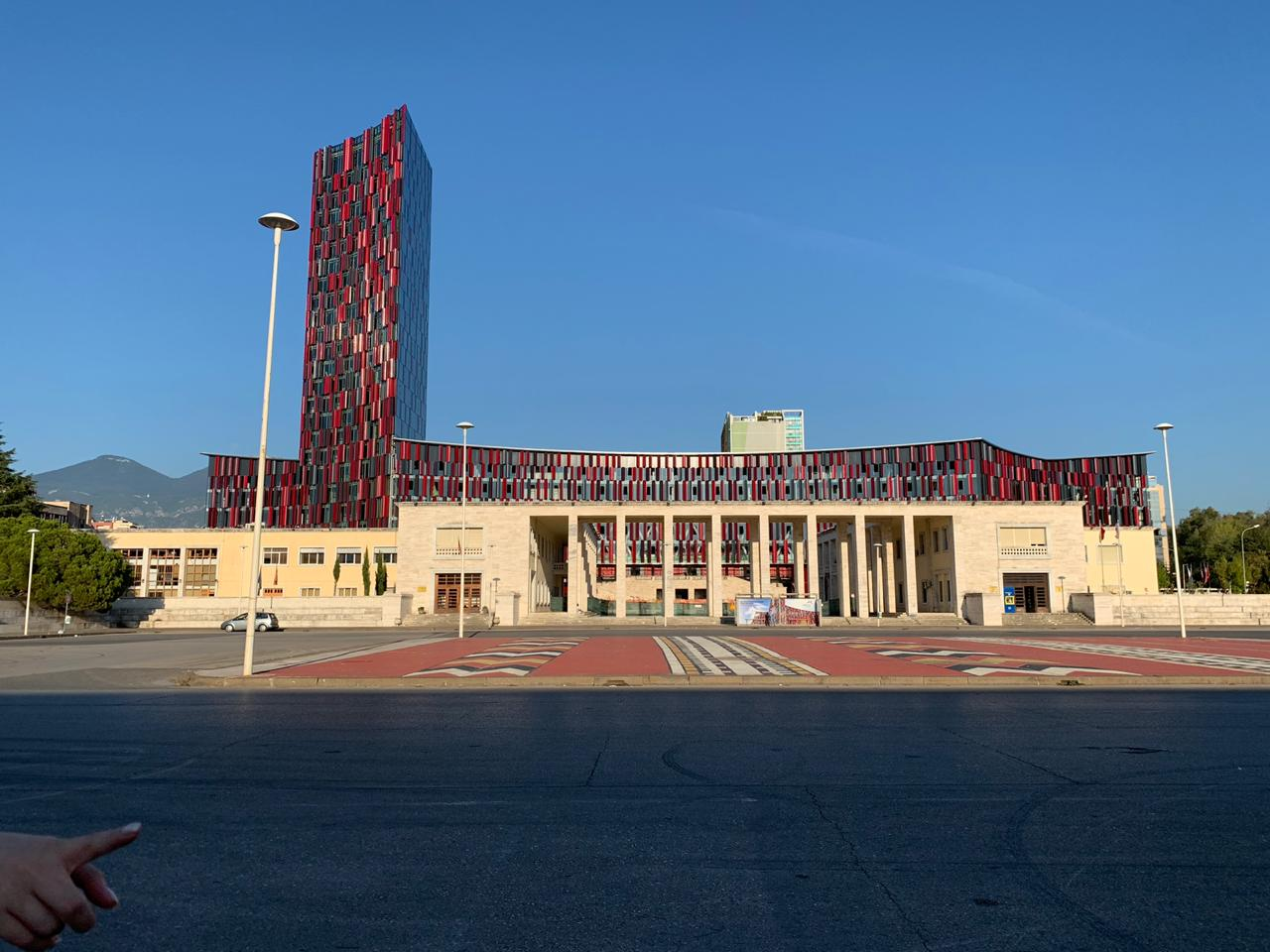
Air Albania Stadium in the city centre under construction

There are two major stadiums, the former Qemal Stafa Stadium and the Selman Stërmasi stadium. The former was demolished in 2016 to make way for the new national stadium. The new stadium called the Air Albania Stadium was constructed on the same site of the former Qemal Stafa Stadium and opened in November 2019. It will have an underground parking lot, Marriott Tirana Hotel, shops and bars and will be used for entertainment events. Tirana's sports infrastructure is developing fast because of the investments from the municipality and the government.

Football is the most widely followed sport in Tirana as well as in the country, having numerous club teams including the KF Tirana, Partizani Tirana, and Dinamo Tirana. It is popular at every level of society, from children to wealthy professionals. In football, as of April 2012, the Tirana-based teams have won a combined 57 championships out of 72 championships organised by the FSHF, i.e. 79% of them. Another popular sport in Albania is basketball, represented in particular by the teams KB Tirana, BC Partizani, BC Dinamo, Ardhmëria and also the women's PBC Tirana.

Recently two rugby teams were created: Tirana Rugby Club, founded in 2013 and Ilirët Rugby Club founded in 2016.

=== Media ===
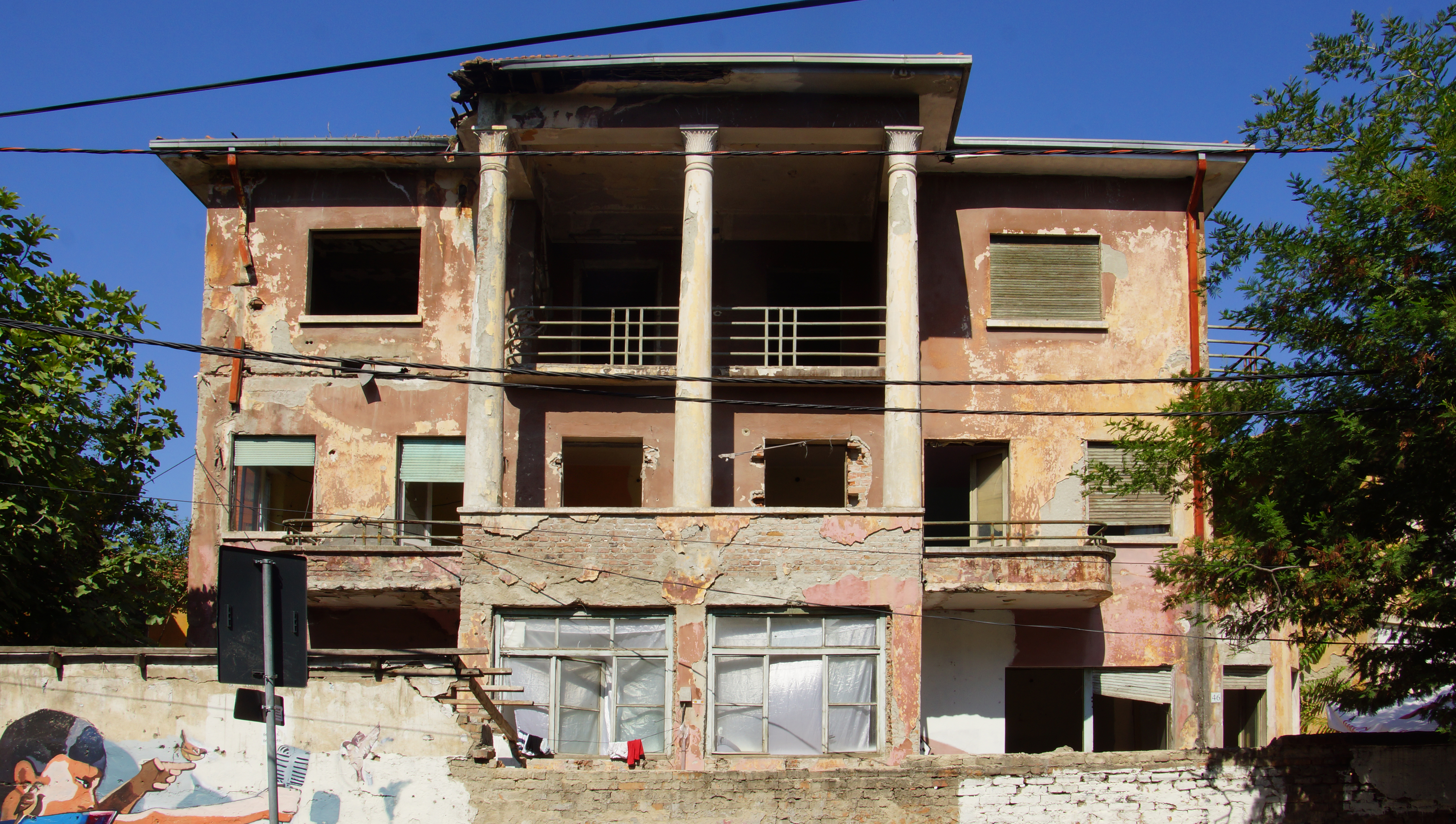
The former grounds of the headquarters of Radio Tirana. Radio Televizioni Shqiptar (RTSH) was initially founded as Radio Tirana in 1938.

As the capital, Tirana is the most significant location for the Albanian media industry whose content is distributed throughout Albania, Kosovo and other Albanian-speaking territories. Tirana is the home to most of the national and international television stations, including the national broadcaster, Radio Televizioni Shqiptar (RTSH), along with all its television and radio networks. The three largest Albanian commercial broadcasters, such as Televizioni Klan, Top Channel and Vizion Plus, also maintains their headquarters in the city. The European broadcaster, Euronews, operates a franchise in the city as well as the American broadcaster CNN.

Tirana is also a principal location for the largest Albanian newspapers, magazines and publications. The newspapers with the largest circulations in Albania are published in Tirana, including Gazeta Shqip, Gazeta Tema, Koha Jonë and Panorama. Gazeta Shqiptare, one of the oldest Albanian-language newspapers in Albania, operates and has its headquarters in the city. Tirana also has a well-established English-language newspaper, notably the daily of Tirana Times.

== Notable people ==
=== Key of Tirana ===
The Key of Tirana (Albanian: Çelësi i Qytetit) is a symbolic recognition given by the Mayor of Tirana to an esteemed personality. It was given to:

- Atifete Jahjaga, Kosovo-Albanian politician and activist
- Bebe Rexha, Albanian-American singer and songwriter
- Dritan Abazović, Montenegrin-Albanian politician
- Dua Lipa, English-Kosovo-Albanian singer and songwriter
- Eleni Foureira, Greek-Albanian singer
- Emeli Sandé, Scottish singer and songwriter
- Ermal Meta, Italian-Albanian singer and songwriter
- Giorgio Toschi, Italian commander
- Giusy Ferreri, Italian singer and songwriter
- Fatboy Slim, English musician
- István Tarlós, Hungarian politician
- Kolinda Grabar-Kitarović, Former Croatian president
- Nexhmije Pagarusha, Kosovo-Albanian icon and singer
- Noel Malcolm, English journalist and historian
- Riccardo Cocciante, Italian singer and songwriter
- Rita Ora, British-Albanian singer and songwriter
- Robin Krasniqi, German-Kosovo-Albanian boxer
- Stevo Pendarovski, Macedonian politician

== See also ==
- Timeline of Tirana
- Symbols of Tirana
- Landmarks of Tirana
