= 2011 Albanian local elections =

- 8 May 2011

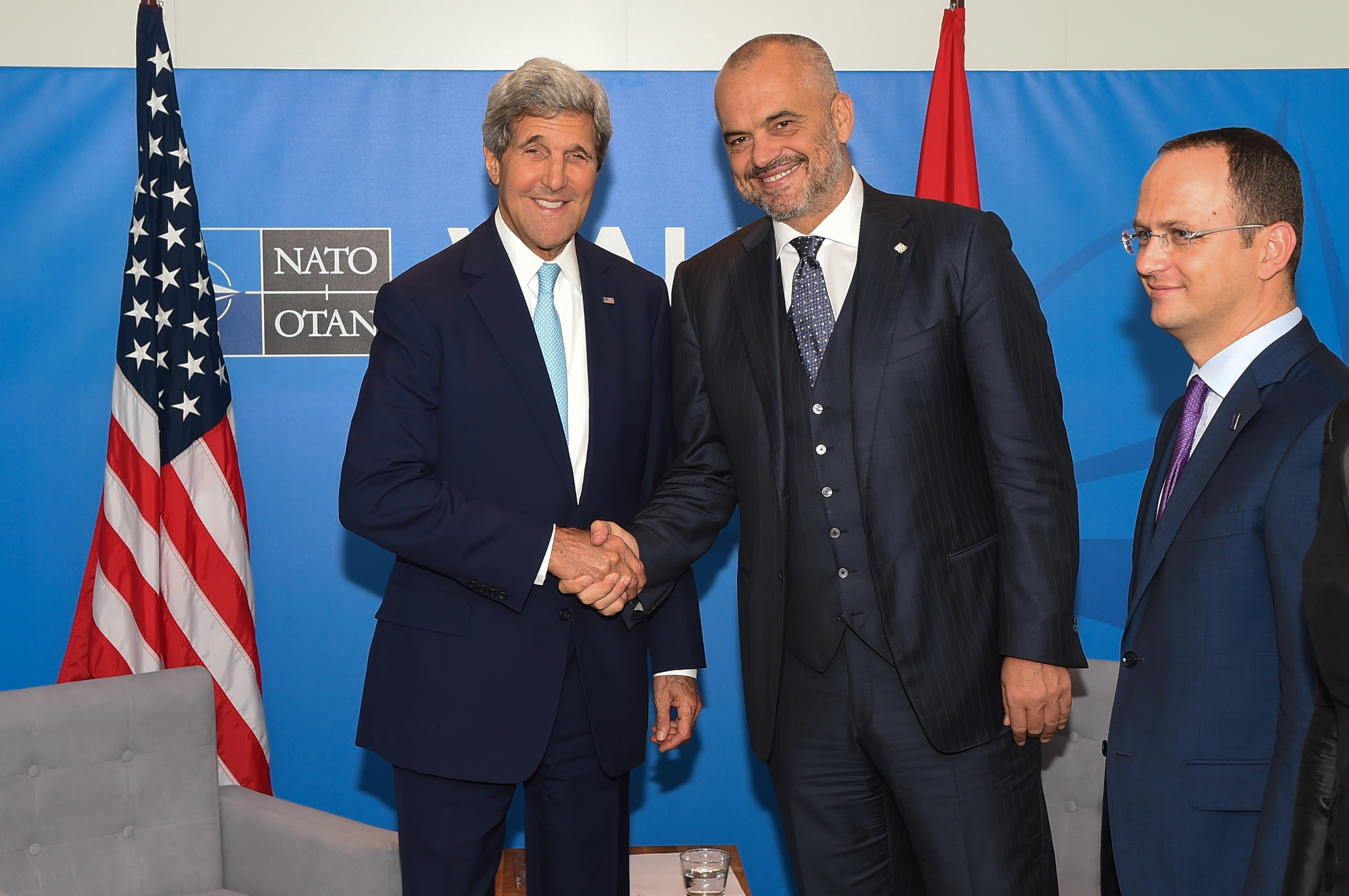
	First party	Second party
Leader	Sali Berisha	Edi Rama
Party	PD	PS
Coalition	Coalition for the Citizen	Coalition for the Future
Votes	813,335	671,612
Municipalities	42	35
Communes	173	103

The Albanian local elections of 2011 took place on 8 May 2011 in Albania. Electors were asked to elect their municipality's mayor, municipal council members, municipal unit mayor, and municipal unit members. The elections were administrated by the Central Election Commission of Albania. Only 9 of the 384 winning candidates were women.

== Parties and coalitions ==
The two coalitions taking part in the 2011 local elections were the Coalition of the Citizen (Albanian: Aleanca për Qytetarin) formed by the Democratic Party of Albania and Coalition for the Future (Albanian: Aleanca për të Ardhmen) formed by the Socialist Party of Albania.

Number	Party name (in Albanian)	Acronym	Chairman	Coalition
1	Lidhja Demokristiane Shqiptare	LDK	Nikoll Lesi	Aleanca për Qytetarin
2	Partia Demokratike e Shqipërisë	PD	Sali Berisha	Aleanca për Qytetarin
3	Lëvizja për Drejtësi e Shqiptarëve	LDSH	Astrit Kosturi	–
4	Partia Aleanca Kombëtare	PAK	Krenar Tahiri	–
5	Partia Minoriteti Etnik Grek për të Ardhmen	MEGA	Kristo Kico	–
6	Partia Ora e Shqipërisë	POSH	Zef Shtjefni	Aleanca për Qytetarin
7	Partia Lëvizja e Legalitetit	PLL	Ekrem Spahiu	Aleanca për Qytetarin
8	Partia të Drejtave të Mohuara e Re	PDM e Re	Fatmir Hoxha	Aleanca për Qytetarin
9	Partia Personat me Aftësi të Kufizuar	PPAK	Afrim Jeshili	Aleanca për Qytetarin
10	Bashkimi Liberal Demokratik	BLD	Arjan Starova	Aleanca për Qytetarin
11	Partia Balli Kombëtar	PBK	Adriatik Alimadhi	Aleanca për Qytetarin
12	Aleanca Demokratike	AD	Neritan Ceka	Aleanca për Qytetarin
13	Partia Balli Kombëtar Demokrat	PBKD	Artur Roshi	Aleanca për Qytetarin
14	Partia Komuniste e Shqipërisë	PKSH	Hysni Milloshi	–
15	Partia e Punës e Shqipërisë e Riorganizuar	PPSHR	Marko Dajti	Aleanca për të Ardhmen
16	Partia Aleanca Popullore	PAP	Fatjon Softa	Aleanca për Qytetarin
17	Partia për Zhvillim Kombëtar	LZHK	Dashamir Shehi	–
18	Partia Agrare Ambjentaliste	PAA	Lufter Xhuveli	Aleanca për Qytetarin
19	Partia Konservatore	PKONS	Armando Ruco	Aleanca për Qytetarin
20	Partia Bashkimi Demokrat Shqiptar	PBD	Ylber Valteri	Aleanca për të Ardhmen
21	Partia Republikane Shqiptare	PR	Fatmir Mediu	Aleanca për Qytetarin
22	Partia Bashkimi Republikan Shqiptar	PBR	Zane Llazi	Aleanca për të Ardhmen
23	Partia Aleanca e Maqedonasve për Integrimin Europian	AMIE	Edmond Themelko	Aleanca për Qytetarin
24	Lëvizja Socialiste për Integrim	LSI	Ilir Meta	Aleanca për Qytetarin
25	Partia Lëvizja Punëtore Shqiptare	PLPSH	Shefqet Musaraj	–
26	Partia për Drejtësi, Integrim dhe Unitet	PDIU	Shpëtim Idrizi	Aleanca për Qytetarin
27	Partia për Mbrojtjen e të Drejtave të Punëtorve të Shqipërisë	PMDPSH	Kadri Isufaj	Aleanca për të Ardhmen
28	Partia Ardhmëria Shqiptare	PASH	Emin Subashi	Aleanca për të Ardhmen
29	Partia Reformatore Demokratike	PRDSH	Skender Halili	Aleanca për të Ardhmen
30	Partia Aleanca Demokristiane	ADK	Zef Bushati	Aleanca për Qytetarin
31	Partia Demokrate për Integrim e Prosperitet	PDIP	Halim Seitaj	Aleanca për të Ardhmen
32	Partia Socialiste e Moderuar	PSM	Gjergj Koja	Aleanca për të Ardhmen
33	Partia Demokristiane e Shqipërisë	PDK	Nard Ndoka	Aleanca për të Ardhmen
34	Partia e Çështjeve Shqiptare	PÇSH	Bujar Shurdhi	–
35	Partia Demokracia e Re Europiane	PDRE	Koci Tahiri	Aleanca për Qytetarin
36	Partia e Pajtimit Kombëtar	PPK	Spartak Dobi	Aleanca për të Ardhmen
37	Partia Aleanca Arbnore Kombëtare	AAK	Gjet Ndoj	Aleanca për të Ardhmen
38	Partia e Unitetit Kombëtar	PUK	Idajet Beqiri	Aleanca për të Ardhmen
39	Partia e Gjelbër	PGJ	Edlir Petanaj	Aleanca për të Ardhmen
40	Partia Mendimi i Djathtë Liberal	MDL	Laureta Lici	–
41	Partia Demokracia Sociale	PDS	Paskal Milo	Aleanca për të Ardhmen
42	Aleanca për Mirëqenie dhe Solidaritet	AMS	Koco Danaj	–
43	Partia Kristian Demokrate e Shqipërisë	PKDSH	Zef Lleshaj	–
44	Aleanca Europiane Ekologjike	AEE	Sazan Guri	Aleanca për Qytetarin
45	Partia Demokratike e Bashkimit Mysliman të Shqiperisë	PDBMSH	Sabri Jacaj	Aleanca për të Ardhmen
46	Partia Aleanca për Demokraci dhe Solidaritet	ADS	Gaqo Apostoli	Aleanca për Qytetarin
47	Partia Socialdemokrate	PSD	Skender Gjinushi	Aleanca për të Ardhmen
48	Partia Bashkimi Popullor i Pensionistëve Shqiptar	PBPPSH	Selami Jenishehri	Aleanca për të Ardhmen
49	Partia për Mbrojtjen e të Drejtave të Emigrantëve	PMDE	Ymer Kurti	Aleanca për të Ardhmen
50	Partia Socialiste e Vërtetë 91	PSV 91	Petro Koçi	Aleanca për të Ardhmen
51	Partia Socialiste e Shqipërisë	PSSH	Edi Rama	Aleanca për të Ardhmen
52	Partia Ligj dhe Drejtësi	PLiDr	Spartak Ngjela	Aleanca për të Ardhmen
53	Partia Rruga e Lirisë	PRRL	Shukrane Muda	Aleanca për të Ardhmen
54	Partia Bashkimi për të Drejtat e Njeriut	PBDNJ	Vangjel Dule	–
55	Partia G99	G99	Ervin Mete	Aleanca për të Ardhmen
56	Partia Toleranca e Re e Shqipërisë	PTR	Avdi Keci	Aleanca për të Ardhmen

== Process ==
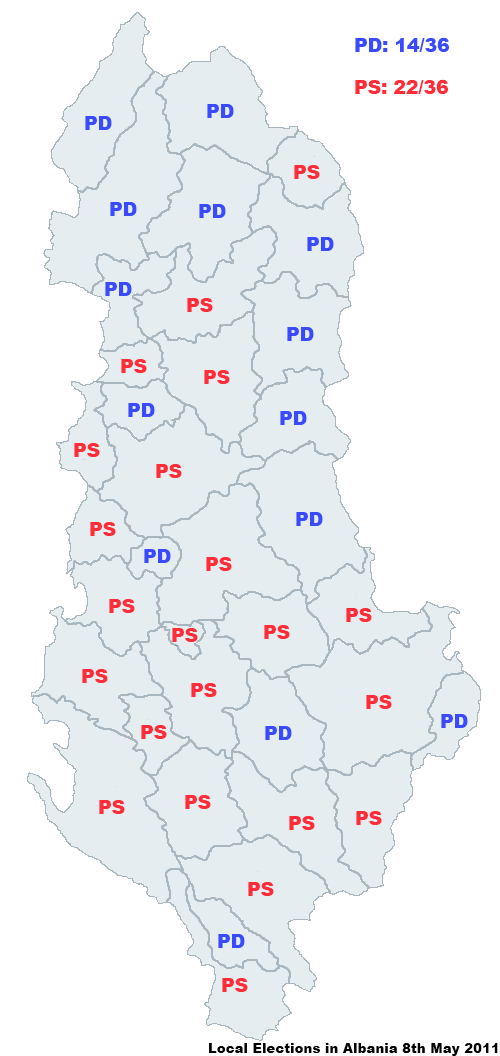
Districts capitals

In total, 7882 voting centers in the country opened at 7:00 am and closed at 8:00 pm. The voter turnout countrywide was about 50.9%.

== Tirana election ==
=== Polls ===
The Socialist Party-led Coalition of the Future published a poll that predicted the electoral victory of Edi Rama in Tirana, while TV Klan, an Albanian private channel published a poll of the Gani Bobi Institute predicting a victory of Lulzim Basha.

Party	Coalition of the Citizen	Coalition for the Future	Ref
Socialist Party	47%	53%	
Gani Bobi Institute	58.4%	39.8%	

=== Voting process ===
The counting process lasted 6 days and was marked by mutual stalls from parties involved, and the intervention of most prominent foreign Ambassadors accredited to the country for moving the process forward. On 14 May 2011, after the last ballot box determining the result for the Tirana election was counted, it revealed that Edi Rama, the Coalition for the Future candidate was ahead by only 10 votes from Lulzim Basha, the candidate of the Coalition for the Citizen. Thus, the pre-eliminary result pointed to Edi Rama as the winner of the Tirana Mayoral election. The tally was awaiting final certification by the KQZ.

=== Recount and final decision ===
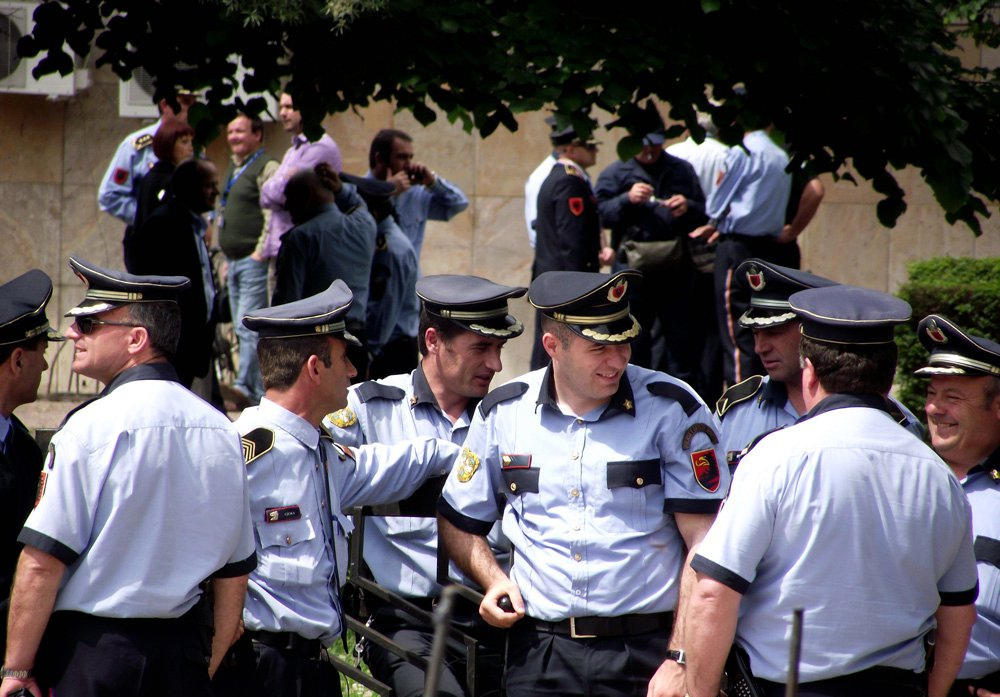
Albanian police guarding the KQZ.

KQZ results in Tirana by Administrative divisions: Aleanca për Qytetarin Aleanca për të Ardhmen

The latter declared that ballots inserted on the wrong ballot boxes should have been counted as well. Indeed, voters were asked to elect local city, and municipal unit mayors as well. Thus, KQZ overrode local KZAZ's decisions and started to count all invalid ballots cast on the wrong ballot boxes. The final tally revealed that Lulzim Basha won the Tirana race by 81 votes more than Edi Rama. Thus, the winner for the Tirana mayoral chair was declared to be Lulzim Basha. Edi Rama filed an appeal at the Electoral College to overthrow the result and re-instate the 14 May tally that pointed to him as the winner of the election. All instances rejected Rama's appeal, and on 25 July 2011 Lulzim Basha was sworn in as the new Mayor of Tirana.

Tirana District
Municipality/Communes	Coalition for the Citizen	Coalition for the Future	Winning party	Voter turnout
Tirana	Lulzim Basha (49.74%)	Edi Rama (49.70%)	Coalition for the Citizen	53.01%
Tirana 1	Agron Seseri (46.78%)	Lindita Nikolla (53.22%)	Coalition for the Future	51%
Tirana 2	Elez Gjoza (51.84%)	Artemon Cukalla (48.16%)	Coalition for the Citizen	56%
Tirana 3	Ilir Kokona (50.92%)	Enver Sulollari (49.08%)	Coalition for the Citizen	52%
Tirana 4	Hysen Xhura (54.23%)	Vahid Kalaja (45.77%)	Coalition for the Citizen	47%
Tirana 5	Erisa Xhixho (42.68%)	Jeta Seitaj (57.32%)	Coalition for the Future	55%
Tirana 6	Luzhiana Abazaj (49.20%)	Krenar Cenollari (50.80%)	Coalition for the Future	42%
Tirana 7	Krenar Alimehmeti (49.25%)	Erion Koka (50.75%)	Coalition for the Future	54%
Tirana 8	Arben Tafaj (59.21%)	Sadi Vorpsi (40.79%)	Coalition for the Citizen	53%
Tirana 9	Indrit Fortuzi (51.78%)	Armond Halebi (48.22%)	Coalition for the Citizen	54%
Tirana 10	Blend Fuga (57.15%)	Enada Alikaj (42.85%)	Coalition for the Citizen	53%
Tirana 11	Haki Mustafa (55.45%)	Naim Asllani (44.55%)	Coalition for the Citizen	55%

== Turnout percentages ==
County	Percentage	Percentage women
Berat	47.7%	52.4%
Dibër	58.8%	48.7%
Durrës	48.7%	35.1%
Elbasan	55.2%	41.9%
Fier	42.9%	43.5%
Gjirokastër	55.3%	44.7%
Korçë	52.0%	45.6%
Kukës	66.9%	46.1%
Lezhë	44.9%	46.7%
Shkodër	58.6%	48.8%
Tirana	38.1%	49.1%
Vlorë	42.1%	42.1%
Total	50.9%	45.4%

The voter turnout in the municipalities (bashki) was:

- Bajram Curri 58%
- Ballsh 55%
- Berat 41%
- Bilisht 63%
- Bulqizë 62%
- Burrel 57%
- Çorovodë 61%
- Delvinë 41%
- Durrës 42%
- Elbasan 47%
- Ersekë 52%
- Fier 42%
- Gramsh 55%
- Gjirokastër 46%
- Kamëz 55%
- Kavajë 40%
- Koplik 51%
- Korçë 45%
- Krujë 62%%
- Krumë 73%
- Kukës 65%
- Laç 49%
- Lezhë 48%
- Librazhd 58%
- Lushnje 49%
- Peqin 56%
- Përmet 50%
- Pogradec 47%
- Pukë 68%
- Rrëshen 56%
- Sarandë 39%
- Shkodër 39%
- Tepelenë 58%
- Tirana 53.01%
- Vlorë 41%

== Results ==
=== Berat County ===
Berat District
Municipality/Communes	Coalition for the Citizen	Coalition for the Future	Winning party/Coalition	Voter turnout
Berat	Ilir Decolli (47.51%)	Fadil Nasufi (52.49%)	Coalition for the Future	41%
Cukalat	Justi Zyka (57.11%)	Xhevdet Kodheli (42.89%)	Coalition for the Citizen	70%
Kutalli	Dritan Sula (40.43%)	Shpëtim Vrapi (59.57%)	Coalition for the Future	53.46%
Lumas	Zarif Salaj (53.52%)	Përparim Doko (46.48%)	Coalition for the Citizen	50.70%
Otllak	Durim Myftaraj (49.91%)	Dalip Kanaçi (50.09%)	Coalition for the Future	49.55%
Poshnje	Kujtim Pelivani (49.97%)	Meleq Lila (50.03%)	Coalition for the Future	55%
Roshnik	Asllan Bejasi (45.90%)	Petrit Fiska (54.10%)	Coalition for the Future	59%
Sinjë	Agron Abazaj (41.45%)	Pelivan Sinaj (58.55%)	Coalition for the Future	58%
Tërpan	Edmont Zotkaj (45.82%)	Engjëll Veliaj (54.18%)	Coalition for the Future	56%
Ura Vajgurore	Thoma Rumniçi (46.98%)	Syrja Ormënaj (53.02%)	Coalition for the Future	53%
Velabisht	Kastriot Rapaj (51.94%)	Krenar Hoxha (48.06%)	Coalition for the Citizen	54%
Vërtop	Guximtar Gojka (47.01%)	Flamur Balliu (52.99%)	Coalition for the Future	57%

Kuçovë District
Municipality/Communes	Coalition for the Citizen	Coalition for the Future	Winning party/Coalition	Voter turnout
Kozarë	Myslim Haxhi (56.98%)	Fatmir Doksani (43.02%)	Coalition for the Citizen	57%
Kuçovë	Selfo Kapllani (45.83%)	Bardhy Gjyzeli (54.17%)	Coalition for the Future	40%
Perondi	Rexhep Hajdari (58.27%)	Ramiz Oboni (41.73%)	Coalition for the Citizen	49%

Skrapar District
Municipality/Communes	Coalition for the Citizen	Coalition for the Future	Other/Independent	Winning party/Coalition	Voter turnout
Bogovë	Fadil Kapllani (63.36%)	Jonus Gorezi (36.64%)	–	Coalition for the Citizen	62%
Çepan	Besnik Osmëni (68.54%)	Dalip Çuku (31.46%)	–	Coalition for the Citizen	74%
Çorovodë	Nesim Spahiu (58.57%)	Rezart Hoxha (41.43%)	–	Coalition for the Citizen	58.54%
Gjerbës	Dilaver Zyko (39.84%)	Trëndafil Lajthia (60.16%)	–	Coalition for the Future	61%
Leshnjë	Ilirjan Hodo (54.29%)	Irakli Gjoni (45.71%)	–	Coalition for the Citizen	75%
Poliçan	Çaush Qato (49.56%)	Adriatik Zotkaj (50.44%)	–	Coalition for the Future	55%
Potom	Ilir Kokomani (43.94%)	Edmond Omeri (56.06%)	–	Coalition for the Future	70%
Qënder	Gazmir Hysaj (38.63%)	Astrit Mustafaj (61.37%)	–	Coalition for the Future	49%
Vëndreshë	Sulejman Dervishi (79.84%)	Bashkim Yzeiraj (20.16%)	–	Coalition for the Citizen	65%
Zhepë	Sulejman Seitaj (53.18%)	Selam Osmënllari (11.44%)	Fari Breshani (LZHK) (35.38%)	Coalition for the Citizen	57%

=== Dibër County ===
Bulqizë District
Municipality/Communes	Coalition for the Citizen	Coalition for the Future	Winning party/Coalition	Voter turnout
Bulqizë	Roland Keta(51.5%)	Myftit Durici (49.5%)	Coalition for the Citizen	62%
Fushë-Bulqizë	Isuf curri (39.8%)	Fluturim Zeneli (61.2%)	Coalition for the Future	67%
Gjoricë	Xhelal Mera (45.7%)	Vehbi Xheka (54.3%)	Coalition for the Future	67%
Martanesh	Gezim Hysa (11.93%)	Gazmend Kenga (88.07%)	Coalition for the Future	60%
Ostren	Razi Rama (59.3%)	Fatos Tola (41.7%)	Coalition for the Citizen	62%
Shupenzë	Muis Llani (60.4%)	Shahin Kaja (39.6%)	Coalition for the Citizen	64%
Trebisht	Fitim Balla (52.3%)	Etmond Osmani (47.7%)	Coalition for the Citizen	65%
Zerqan	Derfim Fiku (64.8%)	Lulzim Lala (35.2%)	Coalition for the Citizen	61%

Dibër District
Municipality/Communes	Coalition for the Citizen	Coalition for the Future	Other/Independent Candidates	Winning party/Coalition	Voter turnout
Arras	Bekim Krashi (32.4%)	Sali Tershalla (37.4%)	Ferit Alia (30.2%)	Coalition for the Future	64%
Fushë-Çidhën	Aranit Skepi (76.7%)	Fatmir Buci (23.3%)	-	Coalition for the Citizen	53%
Kala e Dodës	Zyber Lita (43.4%)	Bajram Himallari (56.6%)	-	Coalition for the Future	60%
Kastriot	Hamza Leshi (66.3%)	Shpetim Pira (37.7%)	-	Coalition for the Citizen	56%
Lurë	Llesh Doci (33.9%)	Avni Buci (17.0%)	Hakik Gjokola (49.1%)	Hakik Gjokola (Ind.)	76%
Luzni	Haxhi Damzi (49.7%)	Ali Drenova (50.3%)	-	Coalition for the Future	67%
Maqellarë	Bardhyl Agolli (50.6%)	Arben Keshi (49.4%)		Coalition for the Citizen	58%
Melan	Neki Mehmeti (65.2%)	Muharem Balliu (34.8%)	-	Coalition for the Citizen	60%
Muhur	Rahim Lala (47.29%)	Afrim Mikli (52.7%)	Fatbardh Lala (0.01%)	Coalition for the Future	61%
Peshkopi	Ilir Krosi (59.5%)	Ilir Vranici (40.5%)	-	Coalition for the Citizen	59%
Qendër Tomin	Sadik Cena (54.5%)	Agron Cara (45.5%)	–	Coalition for the Citizen	61%
Selishtë	Xhemal Delishi (83.2%)	Mersim Lala (16.8%)	–	Coalition for the Citizen	66%
Sllovë	Ramzan Kaza (46.3%)	Fatos Mandrri (53.7%)	-	Coalition for the Future	67%
Zall-Dardhë	Niazi Cani (54.2%)	Artan Murati (45.8%)	-	Coalition for the Citizen	63%
Zall-Reç	Rufat Shoti (49.3%)	Esat Shehu (50.7%)	-	Coalition for the Future	67%

Mat District
Municipality/Communes	Coalition for the Citizen	Coalition for the Future	Others/Independent Candidates	Winning party/Coalition	Voter turnout
Baz	Fatmir Kurti (64.4%)	Hanke Nelaj (34.6%)	–	Coalition for the Citizen	64%
Burrel	Skender Lleshi (46.0%)	Adelina Farrici (54.0%)	–	Coalition for the Future	55.68%
Derjan	Kujtim Kazdeda (44.7%)	Hasan Pasha (25.3%)	Sami Bushi (29.9%)	Coalition for the Citizen	67%
Gurrë	Mustafa Celami (50.1%)	Sali Celami (49.9%)	–	Coalition for the Future	72%
Klos	Ramzan Mjeshteri (57.7%)	Mexhit Sina (43.3%)	–	Coalition for the Citizen	64%
Komsi	Ymer Barci (51.1%)	Dashnor Aliu (48.9%)	–	Coalition for the Citizen	64%
Lis	Agim Selita (47.2%)	Hysni Meta (10.2%)	Xhezmi Dika (42.6%)	Coalition for the Citizen	63%
Macukull	Skender Gjuci (57.3%)	Gazmir Hysa (42.7%)	–	Coalition for the Citizen	65%
Rukaj	Nevruz Kurti (32.8%)	Hamit Gjokrosa (34.6%)	Rasim Hoxha (32.6%)	Coalition for the Future	58%
Suc	Lutfi Cara (41.64%)	Dritan Pjeci (28.59%)	Ylli Meta (29.77%)	Coalition for the Citizen	63%
Ulëz	Adrijet Gjeci (57.36%)	Arjan Limaci (41.55%)	Arben Kalthi (1.09%)	Coalition for the Citizen	45%
Xibër	Lutfi Ceka (51.70%)	Kushtrim Muca (25.99%)	Petrit Hoxha (22.31%)	Coalition for the Citizen	64%

=== Durrës County ===
Durrës District
Municipality/Communes	Coalition for the Citizen	Coalition for the Future	Other/Independent	Winning party/Coalition	Voter turnout
Durrës	Ferdinand Xhaferraj (47.16%)	Vangjush Dako (52.84%)	–	Coalition for the Future	42%
Gjepalaj	Ardian Kokomani (48.03%)	Fatmir Elezi (27.78%)	Alfred Greca (24.19%)	Coalition for the Citizen	56%
Ishem	Gezim Ylli (40.48%)	Sulejman Ibrahimi (59.52%)	–	Coalition for the Future	57%
Katund i Ri	Hil Priska (70.17%)	Servet Balla (29.83%)	–	Coalition for the Citizen	46%
Maminas	Dashnor Osmani (48.29%)	Ismail Qani (51.71%)	–	Coalition for the Future	50%
Manez	Bujar Huqi (55.90%)	Sokol Sula (44.10%)	–	Coalition for the Citizen	51%
Rashbull	Hysen Gashi (55.52%)	Shkelqim Troplini (44.48%)	–	Coalition for the Citizen	46%
Shijak	Afrim Brahimaj (46.51%)	Indrit Buka (53.49%)	–	Coalition for the Future	50%
Sukth	Sherif Fortuzi (54.00%)	Selami Xhelili (30.78%)	Hysen Llaca (15.22%)	Coalition for the Citizen	40%
Xhafzotaj	Agim Hoxha (82.99%)	Basri Gjoka (17.01%)	–	Coalition for the Citizen	35%

Krujë District
Municipality/Communes	Coalition for the Citizen	Coalition for the Future	PBDNJ	LZHK	Winning party/Coalition	Voter turnout
Bubq	Skënder Gjoni (17.19%)	Qemal Daci (38.50%)	Abdyl Denjeli (32.15%)	Agron Loka (12.16%)	Coalition for the Future	58%
Cudhi	Hysen Pula (71.2%)	Naim Allushi (28.8%)	–	–	Coalition for the Citizen	78%
Fushë-Krujë	Bilal Stafuka (41.82%)	Gjon Bardhi (58.18%)	–	–	Coalition for the Future	58%
Kodër-Thumanë	Gezim Keqi (39.30%)	Artur Bushi (60.70%)	–	–	Coalition for the Future	57%
Krujë	Shkelzen Hoxha (50.67%)	Ismail Dani (49.33%)	–	–	Coalition for the Citizen	62%
Nikel	Avdi Vathi (44.86%)	Rrahman Rraja (55.14%)	–	–	Coalition for the Future	73%

=== Elbasan County ===
Elbasan District
Municipality/Communes	Coalition for the Citizen	Coalition for the Future	Other/Independent	Winning party/Coalition	Voter turnout
Belsh	Asqeri Kuqja (54.14%)	Arif Tafani (45.86%)	–	Coalition for the Citizen	53%
Bradashesh	Sabri Sollaku (65.74%)	Vasil Terziu (34.26%)	–	Coalition for the Citizen	64%
Cërrik	Servet Duzha (47.70%)	Arben Ruçi (41.53%)	Florenc Doka (LDSH) (10.78%)	Coalition for the Citizen	45%
Elbasan	Durin Hushi (40.73%)	Qazim Sejdini (59.27%)	–	Coalition for the Future	47%
Fierzë	Bedri Qypi (72.03%)	Myslim Kishta (27.97%)	–	Coalition for the Citizen	48%
Funare	Qani Sherja (69.92%)	Roland Hidri (30.08%)	–	Coalition for the Citizen	64%
Gjergjan	Lumturi Hoxha (54.47%)	Faik Giolena (45.53%)	–	Coalition for the Citizen	55%
Gjinar	Kristaq Shqau (60.59%)	Gani Hida (39.41%)	–	Coalition for the Citizen	60%
Gostime	Qamil Boja (51.55%)	Gezim Salla (48.45%)	–	Coalition for the Citizen	52%
Gracen	Xhemal Dopi (62.26%)	Fadil Salla (37.74%)	–	Coalition for the Citizen	73%
Grekan	Xhevair Zdrava (55.15%)	Qemal Rama (44.85%)	–	Coalition for the Citizen	53%
Kajan	Lumturi Ferhati (60.72%)	Jashar Ibrahimi (39.28%)	–	Coalition for the Citizen	52%
Klos, Elbasan	Behar Hoxha (49.46%)	Elis Duzha (26.08%)	Vasjar Shermadhi (Ind.) (24.46%)	Coalition for the Citizen	60%
Labinot-Fushë	Xhemali Quku (41.88%)	Osman Qosja (47.40%)	hamit Meta (LZHK) (10.72%)	Coalition for the Future	68%
Labinot-Mal	Qani Xhafa (68.45%)	Bilal Korra (31.55%)	–	Coalition for the Citizen	73%
Mollas, Elbasan	Agron Hysa (63.09%)	Agron Sade (32.96%)	Agron Cërriku (LDSH) (3.95%)	Coalition for the Citizen	58%
Papër	Gani Cani (48.33%)	Shefqet Bullari (51.67%)	–	Coalition for the Future	54%
Rrasë	Rustem Hasko (50.06%)	Isuf Ferhati (43.53%)	Fadil Hidri (LZHK) (6.41%)	Coalition for the Citizen	54%
Shalës	Vasif Mëhilli (66.26%)	Skënder Çapja (33.74%)	–	Coalition for the Citizen	38%
Shirgjan	Besim Kryemadhi (42.99%)	Mustafa Shehu (57.01%)	–	Coalition for the Future	53%
Shushicë, Elbasan	Ymer Terziu (39.11%)	Lutfi Lala (60.89%)	–	Coalition for the Future	56%
Tregan	Durim Çekrezi (49.28%)	Behar Tashi (50.72%)	–	Coalition for the Future	68%
Zavalinë	Vasil Pëllumbi (20.54%)	Arben Demiri (79.46%)	–	Coalition for the Future	61%

Gramsh District
Municipality/Communes	Coalition for the Citizen	Coalition for the Future	Other/Independent	Winning party/Coalition	Voter turnout
Gramsh	Kastriot Zëra (36.1%)	Dritan Bici (61.3%)	Astrit Kosturi (LDSH) (3.56%)	Coalition for the Future	55%
Kodovjat	Aranit Cela (54.08%)	Nias Elezi (30.26%)	Dritan Seda (Ind.) (15.66%)	Coalition for the Citizen	63%
Kukur	Behar Kokla (40.29%)	Luan Kokla (59.71%)	–	Coalition for the Future	70%
Kushove	Ahmet Zani (38.37%)	Xhevahir Bora (61.63%)	–	Coalition for the Future	65%
Lenie	Lulezim Tace (25.92%)	Astrit Bici (74.08%)	–	Coalition for the Future	64%
Pishaj	Estref Cekrezi (40.31%)	Klodian Taci (36.21%)	Hasim Cekrezi (Ind.) (22.64%); Ali Hysa (Ind.) (0.84%)	Coalition for the Citizen	58%
Porocan	Nefail Kllogjri (37.62%)	Haki Llapushi (44.35%)	Vesel Kullolli (LDSH) (18.03%)	Coalition for the Future	69%
Skenderbegas	Idajet Zyli (46.25%)	Halit Pole (53.75%)	–	Coalition for the Future	68%
Sult	Kodhel Cala (58.40%)	Sami Bezati (41.60%)	–	Coalition for the Citizen	62%
Tunjë	Ylli Kokomeci (21.51%)	Refit Berdellima (64.64%)	Nexhip Hoxha (13.85%)	Coalition for the Future	62%

Librazhd District
Municipality/Communes	Coalition for the Citizen	Coalition for the Future	Other/independent	Winning party/Coalition	Voter turnout
Hotolisht	Fadil Alliu (52.84%)	Shaban Kërçini (47.16%)	–	Coalition for the Citizen	64%
Librazhd	Shefki Çota (57.2%)	Enver Koçi (42.8%)	–	Coalition for the Citizen	58%
Lunik	Asllan Shkrepi (42.16%)	Astrit Xhafa (57.84%)	–	Coalition for the Future	55%
Orenjë	Ndriçim Lila (66.23%)	Ndriçim Hida (33.77%)	–	Coalition for the Citizen	58%
Polis	Veli Terziu (51.96%)	Partizan Ballolli (48.04%)	–	Coalition for the Citizen	59%
Prrenjas	Bajazit Karriqi (51.34%)	Artur Topi (48.66%)	–	Coalition for the Citizen	65%
Qendër	Firdus Kurti (48.30%)	Ramadan Shkurti (51.70%)	–	Coalition for the Future	58%
Qukës	Ymer Blloshmi (47.28%)	Fatmir Kryeziu (52.72%)	–	Coalition for the Future	62%
Rajcë	Seladin Bogdani (48.23%)	Haxhi Çollaku (51.77%)	–	Coalition for the Future	58%
Steblevë	Xhevit Boriçi (48.83%)	Alban Fejza (51.17%)	–	Coalition for the Future	75%
Stravaj	Ardian Zeneli (54.70%)	Xhemal Facja (45.30%)	–	Coalition for the Citizen	66%

Peqin District
Municipality/Communes	Coalition for the Citizen	Coalition for the Future	Independent	Winning party/Coalition	Voter turnout
Gjocaj	Isuf Toli (68.71%)	Artan Hyka (31.29%)	–	Coalition for the Citizen	51%
Karine	Reshat Cela (40.93%)	Selman Karina (59.07%)	–	Coalition for the Future	61%
Pajove	Albert Kreci (56.29%)	Agim Bahja (43.71%)	–	Coalition for the Citizen	62%
Peqin	Ilir Rrushi (74.62%)	Naim Teqja (25.38%)	–	Coalition for the Citizen	56%
Perparim	Agim Xhaja (62.77%)	Kujtim Kasa (37.23%)	–	Coalition for the Citizen	51%
Sheze	Jashar Tabaku (38.85%)	Fatos Tabaku (33.88%)	Shefqet Tabaku (27.27%)	Coalition for the Citizen	50%

=== Fier County ===
Fier District
Municipality/Communes	Coalition for the Citizen	Coalition for the Future	Other/Independent	Winning party/Coalition	Voter turnout
Cakran	Vladimir Korçari (49.44%)	Fatbardha Merkaj (47.14%)	Kujtim Sherifaj (Ind.) (3.41%)	Coalition for the Citizen	52%
Dërmenas	Fadil Selaci (47.26%)	Viktor Fasko (52.74%)	–	Coalition for the Future	45%
Fier	Ilir Bele (42.54%)	Baftjar Zeqaj (57.46%)	–	Coalition for the Future	42%
Frakull e Madhe	Enver Troka (19.02%)	Viktor Çervanaku (55.69%)	Rexhep Troka (LZHK) (15.71%); Saba Hamataj (Ind.) (9.58%)	Coalition for the Future	52%
Kuman	Rajmond Plaka (67.21%)	Banush Gjoni (32.79%)	–	Coalition for the Citizen	58%
Kurjan	Hamza Toro (6.24%)	Qamil Kuka (32.64%)	Adriano Shabanaj (Ind.) (61.12%)	Adriano Shabanaj (Ind.)	65%
Levan	Agim Qejvanaj (41.23%)	Xheladin Malaj (58.77%)	–	Coalition for the Future	40%
Libofshë	Nikolla Zaka (28.53%)	Naun Doko (71.47%)	–	Coalition for the Future	50%
Mbrostar	Vait Bacja (42.11%)	Gëzim Dhima (57.89%)	–	Coalition for the Future	55%
Patos	Dilaver Kamberaj (45.10%)	Rajmonda Balilaj (54.90%)	–	Coalition for the Future	43%
Portëz	Artur Bogdani (40.85%)	Azem Shateri (59.15%)	–	Coalition for the Future	50%
Çlirim	Arsen Kishnapoli (36.11%)	Harilla Mile (63.89%)	–	Coalition for the Future	47%
Roskovec	Gëzim Çaushi (58.20%)	Albert Tafa (41.80%)	–	Coalition for the Citizen	54%
Ruzhdie	Pajtim Gllava (62.64%)	Agim Mesutaj (37.36%)	–	Coalition for the Citizen	60%
Strum	Safet Ruko (58.10%)	Aleksandër Karamani (41.90%)	–	Coalition for the Citizen	61%
Topojë	Sotir Zarka (43.01%)	Arben Voja (56.99%)	–	Coalition for the Future	52%
Zharrëz	Taulant Garxenaj (47.75%)	Arben Semanjaku (47.72%)	Alban Grembi (Ind.) (4.54%)	Coalition for the Citizen	60%

Lushnjë District
Municipality/Communes	Coalition for the Citizen	Coalition for the Future	Other/Independent	Winning party/Coalition	Voter turnout
Allkaj	Petrit Malia (44.73%)	Ergest Gjordeni (48.55%)	Artan Musaku (LZHK) (6.72%)	Coalition for the Future	62%
Ballagat	Sherbet Sharka (52.96%)	Qani Greca (47.04%)	–	Coalition for the Citizen	59%
Bubullimë	Agim Stafa (54.82%)	Aurel Kadillari (45.18%)	–	Coalition for the Citizen	66%
Divjakë	Irakli Gorreja (49.56%)	Fredi Kokoneshi (50.44%)	–	Coalition for the Future	57%
Dushk	Bashkim Kadiu (47.81%)	Afrim Dedej (52.19%)	–	Coalition for the Future	53%
Fier-Shegan	Shkëlqim Murati (51.64%)	Bedri Hida (48.36%)	–	Coalition for the Citizen	57%
Golem, Lushnjë	Refit Çela (45.15%)	Beqir Sulovari (54.85%)	–	Coalition for the Future	50%
Grabian	Ardjan Shurdhaqi (43.06%)	Avdi Snalla (56.94%)	–	Coalition for the Future	49%
Gradishtë	Maksim Cauli (41.01%)	Ylli Stambolliu (58.99%)	–	Coalition for the Future	56%
Hysgjokaj	Ferdinant Sharka (53.02%)	Fejzi Sharka (46.98%)	–	Coalition for the Citizen	63%
Karbunarë	Mynyr Shehu (49.81%)	Neki Arapi (50.19%)	–	Coalition for the Future	56%
Kolonjë	Jakup Beqiri (61.29%)	Altin Koco (38.71%)	–	Coalition for the Citizen	59%
Krutje	Agim Sema (57.46%)	Andrea Muco (42.54%)	–	Coalition for the Citizen	66%
Lushnje	Albert Sanxhaku (40.65%)	Fatos Tushe (59.35%)	–	Coalition for the Future	49%
Rremas	Agim Rredhi (59.40%)	Llazar Stasa (40.60%)	–	Coalition for the Citizen	60%
Tërbuf	Astrit Dervishi (44.49%)	Eltinor Mahmutaj (36.44%)	Durim Muca (LZHK) (19.07%)	Coalition for the Citizen	52%

Mallakastër District
Municipality/Communes	Coalition for the Citizen	Coalition for the Future	Other/Independent	Winning party/Coalition	Voter turnout
Aranitas	Robert Brahaj (42.39%)	Viktor Mahmutaj (57.61%)	–	Coalition for the Future	57%
Ballsh	Dallandyshe Allkaj (47.97%)	Ilir Çela (52.03%)	–	Coalition for the Future	55%
Fratar	Sabire Hoxhaj (49.75%)	Astrit Sejdinaj (50.25%)	–	Coalition for the Future	57%
Greshicë	Baftjar Bakiu (55.24%)	Bilbil Veliaj (44.76%)	–	Coalition for the Citizen	53%
Hekal	Qemal Pashaj (41.99%)	Eqerem Beqiraj (58.01%)	–	Coalition for the Future	50%
Kutë	Gentjan Dervishaj (49.70%)	Ramis Malaj (50.30%)	–	Coalition for the Future	55%
Ngraçan	Nuri Koraj (65.52%)	Besnik Shanaj (34.48%)	–	Coalition for the Citizen	70%
Qendër	Agron Kapllanaj (65.45%)	Sybi Aliaj (34.55%)	–	Coalition for the Citizen	57%
Selitë	Altin Bregasi (51.75%)	Hekuran Resulaj (45.61%)	Nezir Jaupaj (PKSH) (2.63%)	Coalition for the Citizen	62%

=== Gjirokastër County ===
Gjirokastër District
Municipality/Communes	Coalition for the Citizen	Coalition for the Future	Other/Independent	Winning party/Coalition	Voter turnout
Antigonë	Genci Arapi (35.15%)	Ylli Muho (64.85%)	–	Coalition for the Future	52%
Cepo	Dragush Logli (52.10%)	Hodo Çani (47.90%)	–	Coalition for the Citizen	56%
Dropull i Poshtëm	–	–	Dhimitri Maluqi (PBDNJ) (60.02%); Lefter Baruta (MEGA) (39.98%)	PBDNJ	35%
Dropull i Sipërm	–	–	Hristo Duci (PBDNJ) (62.69%); Kostandin Kosta (MEGA) (37.31%)	PBDNJ	28%
Gjirokastër	Genci Sinojmeri (42.79%)	Flamur Bime (54.93%)	Marenglen Koçiu (LZHK) (0.37%) Vjollaca Çekani (Ind.) (1.91%)	Coalition for the Future	46%
Lazarat	Dashnor Aliko (88.91%)	Republika Kasmahu (11.09%)	–	Coalition for the Citizen	77%
Libohovë	Altin Çomo (77.78%)	Bajram Abdi (22.22%)	–	Coalition for the Citizen	52%
Lunxhëri	Ilia Kuro (60.81%)	Fane Gjoka (39.19%)	–	Coalition for the Citizen	43%
Odrie	Fato Jano (43.99%)	–	Jorgji Zharkalli (PBDNJ) (56.01%)	PBDNJ	47%
Picar	Beqir Gjika (59.16%)	Çerçiz Vehipi (40.84%)	–	Coalition for the Citizen	62%
Pogon	–	–	Thanas Qiro (PBDNJ) (55.03%); Mite Mejdi (MEGA) (44.97%)	PBDNJ	29%
Qendër Libohovë	Gentian Koçi (50.17%)	Krenar Kulla (49.83%)	–	Coalition for the Citizen	53%
Zagori	Arqile Mekshi (57.74%)	Ilia Kuro (42.26%)	–	Coalition for the Citizen	49%

Përmet District
Municipality/Communes	Coalition for the Citizen	Coalition for the Future	Other/Independent	Winning party	Voter turnout
Ballaban	Agim Damani (45.25%)	Vullnet Memishahi (10.21%)	Avdul Qazimi (Ind.) (17.70%); Valbona Bërzani (26.84%)	Coalition for the Citizen	48%
Çarshovë	Jani Stefanidhi (47.66%)	Veli Mehmeti (52.34%)	–	Coalition for the Future	51%
Dishnicë	Bujar Fezga (53.90%)	Jorgo Papa (46.10%)	–	Coalition for the Future	50%
Frashër	Vangjel Prifti (52.42%)	Tomorr Kotorri (47.58%)	Ylli Hodo (LZHK) (0.00%)	Coalition for the Citizen	48%
Këlcyrë	Vasil Çarka (48.49%)	Klement Ndoni (51.51%)	–	Coalition for the Future	49%
Përmet	Kujtim Hoxha (45.63%)	Gilberto Jaçe (54.37%)	–	Coalition for the Future	50%
Petran	Niko Shupuli (77.11%)	Agathokli Proko (22.89%)	–	Coalition for the Citizen	56%
Qendër Piskovë	Thoma Puriqi (45.82%)	Bujar Ibrahimi (54.18%)	–	Coalition for the Future	59%
Sukë	Gentian Muhameti (54.05%)	Ali Delilaj (45.95%)	–	Coalition for the Citizen	49%

Tepelenë District
Municipality/Communes	Coalition for the Citizen	Coalition for the Future	Other/Independent	Winning party/Coalition	Voter turnout
Fshat Memaliaj	Lavdie Hadëri (48.62%)	Mynyr Memushi (51.38%)	–	Coalition for the Future	62%
Krahës	Vladimir Resuli (35.83%)	Feta Hoxha (22.43%)	Astrit Dervishi (Ind.) (41.74%)	Astrit Dervishi (Ind.)	52%
Kurvelesh	Asqeri Hoda (45.22%)	Pëllumb Milori (54.78%)	–	Coalition for the Future	65%
Lopës	Malo Sadikaj (32.39%)	Izet Hysi (31.68%)	Argjir Çela (LZHK) (35.93%)	LZHK	59%
Luftinjë	Gëzim Malka (63.12%)	Gramoz Caca (36.88%)	–	Coalition for the Citizen	49%
Memaliaj	Hatixhe Qëndrai (44.82%)	Lulëzim Meçi (55.18%)	–	Coalition for the Future	39%
Qendër	Arian Jera (38.58%)	Redi Rama (61.42%)	–	Coalition for the Future	53%
Qesarat	Arjan Zeqai (42.95%)	Hysni Çela (52.10%)	Andrea Zota (LZHK) (4.95%)	Coalition for the Future	57%
Buz	Bujar Skëndo (59.70%)	Shkelqim Goxha (22.27%)	Andrea Caca (Ind.) (18.03%)	Coalition for the Citizen	56%
Tepelenë	Sevo Miçi (20.31%)	Tërmet Peçi (47.97%)	Reshat Zika (LZHK) (31.72%)	Coalition for the Future	58%

=== Korçë County ===
Devoll District
Municipality/Communes	Coalition for the Citizen	Coalition for the Future	Other/Independent	Winning party/Coalition	Voter turnout
Bilisht	Valter Miza (57.2%)	Haki Ajçe (42.8%)	–	Coalition for the Citizen	67.18%
Hoçisht	Ylli Cenkolli (54.79%)	Astrit Agastra (45.21%)	–	Coalition for the Citizen	58%
Miras	Kryearti Sejdo (55.97%)	Arben Laska (44.03%)	–	Coalition for the Citizen	60%
Progër	Artur Agolli (67.57%)	Vasil Kuko (32.43%)	–	Coalition for the Citizen	58%
Qendër Bilisht	Ramadan Hoxha (60.21%)	Destan Medolli (39.79%)	–	Coalition for the Citizen	57%

Kolonjë District
Municipality/Communes	Coalition for the Citizen	Coalition for the Future	Other/Independent	Winning party/Coalition	Voter turnout
Barmash	Vasil Rrushi (50.97%)	Kostaq Xhelili (49.03%)	–	Coalition for the Citizen	69%
Çlirim	Arjan Hasani (50.41%)	Paqësor Arizaj (49.59%)	–	Coalition for the Citizen	63%
Ersekë	Zhaneta Prifti (44.32%)	Ali Laho (55.68%)	–	Coalition for the Future	52%
Leskovik	Fatmir Guda (62.5%)	Sergei Peshtani (37.5%)	–	Coalition for the Citizen	61.94%
Mollas	Artur Nazarko (50.86%)	Hasan Malushi (18.81%)	Flamur Bilo (Ind.) (30.34%)	Coalition for the Citizen	47%
Novoselë-Kolonjë	Shkëlqim Asllanllari (38.23%)	Adriatik Kambo (61.77%)	–	Coalition for the Future	75%
Qendër Ersekë	Enton Çaçani (55.35%)	Kristaq Andoni (44.65%)	–	Coalition for the Citizen	58%
Qendër Leskovik	Theodhor Bregu (46.78%)	Vladimir Vezuli (33.92%)	Bledi Mezini (Ind.) (19.30%)	Coalition for the Citizen	57%

Korçë District
Municipality/Communes	Coalition for the Citizen	Coalition for the Future	Other/Independent	Winning party/Coalition	Voter turnout
Drenovë	Flamur Sala (50.02%)	Hekuran Pupa (48.07%)	Gjergji Disho (PBDNJ) (1.91%)	Coalition for the Citizen	42%
Gorë	Bujar Salianji (77.11%)	Nazmi Qose (22.89%)	–	Coalition for the Citizen	60%
Korçë	Andrea Mano (46.41%)	Niko Peleshi (53.59%)	–	Coalition for the Future	45%
Lekas	Shefki Mollaj (53.81%)	Nderim Kreka (45.95%)	Andrea Shahinas (Ind.) (0.24%)	Coalition for the Citizen	61%
Libonik	Bujar Kërvaçi (39.84%)	Petrit Kupe (60.16%)	–	Coalition for the Future	50%
Liqenas	Edmond Themelko (71.73%)	Jani Ago (28.27%)	–	Coalition for the Citizen	65%
Maliq	Xhevdet Belishta (47.27%)	Gëzim Topçiu (52.73%)	–	Coalition for the Future	53%
Moglicë	Afrim Beqiraj (50.61%)	Agron Matraku (49.39%)	–	Coalition for the Citizen	63%
Mollaj	Fredi Xhemo (58.44%)	Arsen Selimi (41.56%)	–	Coalition for the Citizen	48%
Pirg	Naum Mujo (53.12%)	Vullnet Gjolla (46.88%)	–	Coalition for the Citizen	63%
Pojan	Alfred Berberi (52.14%)	Vasillaq Çinoku (47.86%)	–	Coalition for the Citizen	54%
Qendër Bulgarec	Artur Lisi (66.03%)	Ilirjan Dule (33.97%)	–	Coalition for the Citizen	52%
Vithkuq	Azis Panariti (50.61%)	Robert Shore (49.39%)	–	Coalition for the Citizen	63%
Voskop	Kujtim Sulo (44.50%)	Ylli Musaka (55.50%)	–	Coalition for the Future	61%
Voskopojë	Nexhip Bacelli (56.97%)	Thanas Zguri (33.12%)	Vangjel Kupe (Ind.) (9.91%)	Coalition for the Citizen	57%
Vreshtaz	Festim Adri (52.75%)	Florenc Tabaku (47.25%)	–	Coalition for the Citizen	58%

Pogradec District
Municipality/Communes	Coalition for the Citizen	Coalition for the Future	Other/Independent	Winning party/Coalition	Voter turnout
Buçimas	Roshi Tollozhina (59.47%)	Valter Gora (40.53%)	–	Coalition for the Citizen	62%
Çërravë	Vladimir Jaçelli (48.70%)	Reshit Fraholli (51.30%)	–	Coalition for the Future	00.00%
Dardhas	Rushan Çela (46.08%)	Aleksandër Çela (53.92%)	–	Coalition for the Future	64%
Hudenisht	Nexhmi Dokollari (40.36%)	Durim Toska (59.64%)	–	Coalition for the Future	67%
Pogradec	Luan Topçiu (43.50%)	Artan Shkëmbi (56.50%)	–	Coalition for the Future	47%
Proptisht	Shaban Sula (49.76%)	Fuat Fero (50.24%)	–	Coalition for the Future	60%
Trebinjë	Feim Jasharllari (54.05%)	Safet Doce (45.95%)	–	Coalition for the Citizen	64%
Velçan	Sali Torra (31.38%)	Maliq Misliu (27.54%)	Ilia Mani (Ind.) (41.08%)	Ilia Mani (Ind.)	67%

=== Kukës County ===
Has District
Municipality/Communes	Coalition for the Citizen	Coalition for the Future	Other/Independent	Winning party/Coalition	Voter turnout
Fajzë	Besim Shurbi (49.2%)	Halil Daçi (34.3%)	Dan Ceka (LZHK) (16.59%)	Coalition for the Citizen	69.33%
Gjinaj	Pellumb Taçi (60.3%)	Qamil Kastrati (39.7%)	–	Coalition for the Citizen	82.57%
Golaj	Zenel Kastrati (52.9%)	Adem Lala (47.1%)	–	Coalition for the Citizen	63.22%
Krumë	Bardhyl Peka (42.7%)	Liman Morina (57.3%)	–	Coalition for the Future	72.19%

Kukës District
Municipality/Communes	Coalition for the Citizen	Coalition for the Future	Other/Independent	Winning party/Coalition	Voter turnout
Arrën	Duleman Marku (37.74%)	Ilir Doçi (62.26%)	–	Coalition for the Future	69%
Bicaj	Arben Korbi (61.66%)	Xhemali Onuzi (38.34%)	–	Coalition for the Citizen	68%
Bushtricë	Kujtim Gjoka (45.98%)	Muharrem Alia (2.05%)	Shahir Sula (LZHK) (35.88%); Flamur Gjana (Ind.) (16.10%)	Coalition for the Citizen	73%
Grykë-Çaje	Vesel Shehu (67.96%)	Ismet Shehu (11.23%)	Florin Lushi (LZHK) (4.99%); Vexhi Shehu (Ind.) (15.81%)	Coalition for the Citizen	71%
Kalis	Ahmet Shira (60.32%)	Shehat Daci (39.68%)	–	Coalition for the Citizen	73%
Kolsh	Zenel Lleshi (40.85%)	–	Abedin Oruçi (Ind.) (59.15%)	Abedin Oruçi (Ind.)	79%
Kukës	Hasan Halili (64.1%)	Alfred Cengu (35.9%)	–	Coalition for the Citizen	65%
Malzi	Bajram Çoti (40.54%)	Astrit Dobrushi (59.46%)	–	Coalition for the Future	70%
Shishtavec	Dilaman Nela (76.23%)	Xheladin Memishi (23.77%)	–	Coalition for the Citizen	57%
Shtiqën	Gëzim Shehu (51.11%)	Astrit Cengu (31.10%)	Dashnor Shehu (AMS) (17.78%)	Coalition for the Citizen	80%
Surroj	Esat Vata (28.99%)	–	Halil Aliaj (Ind.) (51.65%); Shukri Oka (Ind.) (19.37%)	Halil Aliaj (Ind.)	76%
Tërthorë	Gazmend Hallaçi (13.40%)	Ali Xhahu (32.63%)	Skënder Kovaçi (LZHK) (21.03%); Rrahman Demaj (Ind.) (32.94%)	Rrahman Demaj (Ind.)	77%
Topojan	Safet Myftari (66.17%)	Lutfi Islamaj (33.83%)	–	Coalition for the Citizen	59%
Ujëmisht	Besim Peposhi (40.72%)	Ahmet Dede (59.28%)	–	Coalition for the Future	58%
Zapod	Dan Koloshi (72.70%)	Azem Mustafaj (27.30%)	–	Coalition for the Citizen	60%

Tropojë District
Municipality/Communes	Coalition for the Citizen	Coalition for the Future	Other/Independent	Winning party/Coalition	Voter turnout
Bujan	Bujar Hasanpapaj (60.57%)	Sami Bashaj (17.81%)	Sherif Vatoci (PBDNJ) (21.62%)	Coalition for the Citizen	58%
Bytyç	Feriz Hoxha (45.56%)	Avni Muhametaj (17.55%)	Kadri Kataroshi (LZHK) (36.89%)	Coalition for the Citizen	65%
Fierzë	Gjelosh Peplokaj (74.17%)	Egzon Bashkurti (25.83%)	–	Coalition for the Citizen	58%
Lekbibaj	Gjovalin Gjeloshaj (44.93%)	Gëzim Meshaj (50.40%)	Lazër Pjetërgjokaj (LZHK) (4.67%)	Coalition for the Future	55%
Llugaj	Qamil Hoxhaj (48.60%)	Vuksan Çardaku (51.40%)	–	Coalition for the Future	65%
Margegaj	Rexhë Byberi(79.13%)	Zeqir Byberi (20.87%)	–	Coalition for the Citizen	57%
Tropojë Fshat	Ram Kortoçi (69.10%)	Avni Boshnjaku (30.90%)	–	Coalition for the Citizen	61%
Bajram Curri	Agron Demushi (63.33%)	Avni Dega (36.67%)	–	Coalition for the Citizen	58%

=== Lezhë County ===
Kurbin District
Municipality/Communes	Coalition for the Citizen	Coalition for the Future	Other/Independent	Winner	Voter turnout
Fushë-Kuqe	Gjevalin Miri (50.18%)	Gjok Kolici (49.87%)	–	Coalition for the Citizen	62%
Laç	Bardh Rica (39.09%)	Artur Bardhi (60.91%)	–	Coalition for the Future	49%
Mamurras	Ilir Pjetraj (51.09%)	Ded Ndreca (48.91%)	–	Coalition for the Citizen	52%
Milot	Behar Haxhiu (52.46%)	Ilir Haxhiu (47.54%)	–	Coalition for the Citizen	57%

Lezhë District
Municipality/Communes	Coalition for the Citizen	Coalition for the Future	Other/Independent	Winner	Voter turnout
Balldren i Ri	Zef Doci (52.33%)	Gjek Cali (46.42%)	Dedë Bukaqeja (PKSH) (1.25%)	Coalition for the Citizen	45%
Blinisht	Jak Zhuba (57.20%)	Zef Hila (42.80%)	–	Coalition for the Citizen	49%
Dajç	Gjergj Doçi (54.06%)	Rrok Rroku (45.94%)	–	Coalition for the Citizen	53%
Kallmet	Petrit Marku (52.52%)	Shtjefën Haberi (47.48%)	–	Coalition for the Citizen	47%
Kolsh	Jak Pjetri (42.32%)	Ferdinand Ndoj (57.68%)	–	Coalition for the Future	54%
Lezhë	Viktor Tushaj (51.58%)	Gjokë Jaku (48.42%)	–	Coalition for the Citizen	48%
Shëngjin	Zef Gjoka (44.22%)	Salvador Kacaj (55.78%)	–	Coalition for the Future	50%
Shënkoll	Fran Frrokaj (62.51%)	Bardhok Prenga (37.49%)	–	Coalition for the Citizen	49%
Ungrej	Gjovalin Gjoni (78.49%)	Zef Boci (7.62%)	Gjin Kola (LZHK) (13.89%)	Coalition for the Citizen	56%
Zejmen	Arben Doçi (51.33%)	Gjergj Malshi (48.67%)	–	Coalition for the Citizen	54%

Mirditë District
Municipality/Communes	Coalition for the Citizen	Coalition for the Future	Other/Independent	Winner	Voter turnout
Fan	Gjergj Prenga (37.10%)	Neritan Boci (30.37%)	Agostin Mehilli (AMS) (32.53%)	Coalition for the Citizen	67%
Kaçinar	Besnik Zefi (48.36%)	Petro Doda (51.64%)	–	Coalition for the Future	57%
Kthellë	Astrit Dedaj (31.46%)	Tom Lleshaj (29.42%)	Prend Lekgegaj (LZHK) (35.99%); Merita Hasanaj (Ind.) (3.14%)	LZHK	58%
Orosh	Aleksander Lala (50.75%)	Kol Gjomarkaj (21.24%)	Luigj Lleshaj (LZHK) (28.01%)	Coalition for the Citizen	62%
Rrëshen	Gjon Dedaj (42.78%)	Ndue Kolaj (57.22%)	–	Coalition for the Future	56%
Rubik	Mark Ruci (43.91%)	Gjok Vuka (56.09%)	–	Coalition for the Future	51%
Selitë	Vladimir Gjikolaj (59.97%)	Leonard Lleshaj (40.03%)	–	Coalition for the Citizen	56%

=== Shkodër County ===
Malësi e Madhe District
Municipality/Communes	Coalition for the Citizen	Coalition for the Future	Other/Independent	Winning party/Coalition	Voter turnout
Gruemirë	Asim Burgaj (46.21%)	Lirim Nehanaj (53.79%)	–	Coalition for the Future	44%
Kastrat	Viktor Popaj (55.86%)	Tom Curraj (43.37%)	Daka Mujaj (PKDSH) (0.77%)	Coalition for the Citizen	46%
Kelmend	Gjeto Dukaj (54.19%)	Adriatik Cekaj (43.08%)	Nikolin Pecaj (PKDSH) (2.73%)	Coalition for the Citizen	44%
Koplik	Ramadan Likaj (54.45%)	Nazmi Hasanaj (45.55%)	–	Coalition for the Citizen	51%
Qendër	Isa Ramaj (64.08%)	Lulzim Zaraj (35.92%)	–	Coalition for the Citizen	56%
Shkrel	Ferdi Sterkaj (79.41%)	Sokol Vulaj (20.59%)	–	Coalition for the Citizen	52%

Pukë District
Municipality/Communes	Coalition for the Citizen	Coalition for the Future	Other/Independent	Winning party/Coalition	Voter turnout
Blerim	Ndoc Prendi (61.14%)	Gezim Pranga (38.86%)	–	Coalition for the Citizen	53%
Iballe	Gezim Vata (62.95%)	Ndue Doci (37.05%)	–	Coalition for the Citizen	63%
Fierzë	Nik Nika (38.91%)	Vasil Muslia (61.09%)	–	Coalition for the Future	67%
Fushë-Arrëz	Alfred Qafa (58.08%)	Nikolin Bardhoku (41.92%)	–	Coalition for the Citizen	62%
Gjegjan	Ndue Cara (37.14%)	Mark Zefi (26.15%)	Ndue Suma (LZHK) (35.45%); Filip Ndoci (Ind.) (1.26%)	Coalition for the Citizen	62%
Pukë	Beqir Arifi (37.2%)	Enver Sulejmani (35.3%)	Astrit Kuci (PÇSH) (27.57%)	Coalition for the Citizen	68%
Qafë-Mali	Hil Kola (43.26%)	Pavlin Palokaj (35.50%)	Artan Palushi (LZHK) (21.24%)	Coalition for the Citizen	71%
Qelëz	Fatmir Balaj (56.23%)	Marash Kolaj (43.77%)	–	Coalition for the Citizen	66%
Qerret	Rrok Dodaj (60.09%)	Ndue Marinaj (39.91%)	–	Coalition for the Citizen	61%
Rrapë	Ndue Gjoni (70.83%)	Esmir Rringaj (29.17%)	–	Coalition for the Citizen	56%

Shkodër District
Municipality/Communes	Coalition for the Citizen	Coalition for the Future	Other/Independent	Winning party/Coalition	Voter turnout
Ana e Malit	Arben Ceni (44.78%)	Xhevat Mollca (55.22%)	–	Coalition for the Future	55%
Bërdicë	Qamil Xherreta (28.20%)	Besnik Brahimi (43.42%)	Besnik Tahiri (Ind.) (28.39%)	Coalition for the Future	49%
Bushat	Zef Hila (69.83%)	Gojart Salja (30.17%)	–	Coalition for the Citizen	43%
Dajç	Arben Gjuraj (47.36%)	Hil Taraj (23.01%)	Gentian Palaj (Ind.) (29.63%)	Coalition for the Citizen	38%
Gur i Zi	Broz Marku (44.18%)	Martin Lazri (55.82%)	–	Coalition for the Future	49%
Hajmel	Leke Bibaj (60.03%)	Rrok Ftoni (34.28%)	Nikolin Jakini (LZHK) (5.69%)	Coalition for the Citizen	54%
Postribë	Faz Shabaj (56.15%)	Brahim Cekaj (43.85%)	–	Coalition for the Citizen	55%
Pult	Mark Maracaj (14.21%)	Sokol Cubi (85.79%)	–	Coalition for the Future	37%
Rrethinat	Gezim Hardolli (38.72%)	Kleves Muja (47.84%)	Lic Elezi (LZHK) (13.45%)	Coalition for the Future	45%
Shalë	Dede Tonaj (49.92%)	Bale Vuksani (50.08%)	–	Coalition for the Future	47%
Shkodër	Lorenc Luka (64.95%)	Genc Uruci (35.05%)	–	Coalition for the Citizen	39%
Shllak	Hile Kodra (60.18%)	Gjin Ndoj (39.82%)	–	Coalition for the Citizen	60%
Shosh	Mark Kulla (40.66%)	Dake Cezma (25.83%)	Kole Ndrevashaj (LZHK) (33.50%)	Coalition for the Citizen	56%
Temal	Nikolin Guri (46.31%)	Mark Zhuri (53.69%)	–	Coalition for the Future	73%
Vau-Dejës	Gjon Marku (50.24%)	Ded Dodani (49.76%)	–	Coalition for the Citizen	52%
Velipojë	Nikolle Marku (42.04%)	Pashko Ujka (57.96%)	–	Coalition for the Future	54%
Vig-Mnelë	Pjeter Lleshi (52.87%)	Petrit Shtjefeni (1.12%)	Sander Nikolli (PKDSH) (46.01%)	Coalition for the Citizen	54%

=== Tirana County ===
Kavajë District
Municipality/Communes	Coalition for the Citizen	Coalition for the Future	Other/Independent	Winning party/Coalition	Voter turnout
Golem	Engjëll Murrizi (46.91%)	Agron Agalliu (47.26%)	Fatbardh Belba (LZHK) (5.83%)	Coalition for the Future	52%
Gosë	Eqerem Deliu (62.88%)	Sinan Shala (37.12%)	–	Coalition for the Citizen	00.00%
Helmas	Namir Gjoci (68.44%)	Murat Celhaka (31.56%)	–	Coalition for the Citizen	52%
Kavajë	Refik Rrugeja (46.05%)	Elvis Rroshi (53.95%)	–	Coalition for the Future	40%
Kryevidh	Haki Veza (38.80%)	Fatos Kaja (61.20%)	–	Coalition for the Future	46%
Lekaj	Abedin Gjini (62.26%)	Behexhet Beu (37.74%)	–	Coalition for the Citizen	43%
Luz i Vogël	Hajrulla Tafa (54.26%)	Shaziman Hoxha (45.74%)	–	Coalition for the Citizen	40%
Rrogozhinë	Ndriçim Dushku (53.27%)	Haqim Tosku (43.75%)	Xhelal Tosku (LZHK) (2.99%)	Coalition for the Citizen	45.56%
Sinaballaj	Hekuran Sula (40.37%)	Mexhit Saliu (59.63%)	–	Coalition for the Future	57%
Synej	Përparim Çaca (70.31%)	Burhan Çaca (29.69%)	–	Coalition for the Citizen	39%

Tirana District
Municipality/Communes	Coalition for the Citizen	Coalition for the Future	Other/Independent	Winning party/Coalition	Voter turnout
Baldushk	Elmi Allmuça (62.14%)	Bashkim Haxhiu (37.86%)	–	Coalition for the Citizen	75%
Berxullë	Ymer Marku (50.14%)	Vehap Lamaj (49.86%)	–	Coalition for the Citizen	63%
Berzhitë	Genc Drita (58.96%)	Ali Aliu (41.04%)	–	Coalition for the Citizen	75%
Dajt	Besim Kuka (40.05%)	Kujtim Qefalia (59.95%)	–	Coalition for the Future	68%
Farkë	Fatbardh Plaku (68.39%)	Besim Ruçi (31.61%)	–	Coalition for the Citizen	64%
Kamëz	Xhelal Mziu (55.14%)	Rakip Suli (44.86%)	–	Coalition for the Citizen	55%
Kashar	Besnik Fuçia (56.36%)	Jakup Sulaj (43.64%)	–	Coalition for the Citizen	67%
Krrabë	Refik Velija (54.10%)	Artan Saliu (45.90%)	–	Coalition for the Citizen	69%
Ndroq	Fatime Goga (48.58%)	Pëllumb Çurri (51.42%)	–	Coalition for the Future	60%
Paskuqan	Fatos Rexha (56.59%)	Azbi Arapi (43.41%)	–	Coalition for the Citizen	51.4%
Petrelë	Ylli Kupi (55.13%)	Adriatik Kupi (44.87%)	–	Coalition for the Citizen	78%
Pezë	Artur Peza (23.47%)	Nezir Ramazani (27.64%)	Enver Dorzi (Ind.) (48.89%)	Enver Dorzi (Ind.)	64%
Prezë	Ahmet Halili (63.17%)	Sulejman Kaziu (36.83%)	–	Coalition for the Citizen	61%
Shëngjergj	Dritan Duka (68.55%)	Nexhmi Balla (31.45%)	–	Coalition for the Citizen	77%
Tirana	Lulzim Basha (49.74%)	Edi Rama (49.70%)	Hysni Milloshi (PKSH) (0.56%)	Coalition for the Citizen	53.01%
Tirana 1	Agron Seseri (46.78%)	Lindita Nikolla (53.22%)	–	Coalition for the Future	51%
Tirana 2	Elez Gjoca (51.84%)	Artemon Cukalla (48.16%)	–	Coalition for the Citizen	56%
Tirana 3	Ilir Kokona (50.92%)	Enver Sulollari (49.08%)	–	Coalition for the Citizen	52%
Tirana 4	Hysen Xhura (54.23%)	Vahid Kalaja (45.77%)	–	Coalition for the Citizen	47%
Tirana 5	Erisa Xhixho (42.68%)	Jeta Seitaj (57.32%)	–	Coalition for the Future	55%
Tirana 6	Luzhiana Abazaj (49.20%)	Krenar Cenollari (50.80%)	–	Coalition for the Future	42%
Tirana 7	Krenar Alimehmeti (49.25%)	Erion Koka (50.75%)	–	Coalition for the Future	54%
Tirana 8	Arben Tafaj (59.21%)	Sadi Vorpsi (40.79%)	–	Coalition for the Citizen	53%
Tirana 9	Indrit Fortuzi (51.78%)	Armond Halebi (48.22%)	–	Coalition for the Citizen	54%
Tirana 10	Blend Fuga (57.15%)	Enada Alikaj (42.85%)	–	Coalition for the Citizen	53%
Tirana 11	Haki Mustafa (55.45%)	Naim Asllani (44.55%)	–	Coalition for the Citizen	55%
Vaqar	Skënder Drita (39.46%)	Gentian Myrta (60.54%)	–	Coalition for the Future	70%
Vorë	Fiqiri Ismaili (55.94%)	Bashkim Haxhiu (44.06%)	–	Coalition for the Citizen	59%
Zall-Bastar	Rexhep Moqi (42.51%)	Xhemal Çuni (33.12%)	Kujtim Mali (LZHK) (0.49%); Muharrem Bajrami (Ind.) (2.36%); Zyber Kuka (Ind.) (21.52%)	Coalition for the Citizen	71%
Zall-Herr	Agron Shabani (46.08%)	Gani Alushi (53.92%)	–	Coalition for the Future	65%

=== Vlorë County ===
Delvinë District
Municipality/Communes	Coalition for the Citizen	Coalition for the Future	PBDNJ	Other/Independent	Winner	Voter turnout
Delvinë	Dhurim Alimani (60.01%)	Dashamir Hado (39.99%)	–	–	Coalition for the Citizen	41%
Finiq	–	–	Sokrat Spiro (50.02%)	Ziso Lluci (MEGA) (49.98%)	PBDNJ	47%
Mesopotan	–	–	Themistokli Kaishi (45.63%)	Jorgji Sterjo (MEGA) (16.97%); Mihal Bozhori (Ind.) (37.40%)	PBDNJ	43%
Vergo	Fiqiri Kulla (47.70%)	Agim Cumani (41.87%)	–	Robert Dauti (LZHK) (10.44%)	Coalition for the Citizen	50%

Sarandë District
Municipality/Communes	Coalition for the Citizen	Coalition for the Future	PBDNJ	Other/Independent	Winner	Voter turnout
Aliko	Ilia Thanasi (28.93%)	–	Kristo Kaishi (45.56%)	Hristo Cavo (MEGA) (25.51%)	PBDNJ	35%
Dhiver	–	–	Sokrat Kalcuni (61.15%)	Petraq Bereti (MEGA) (38.85%)	PBDNJ	31%
Konispol	Petrit Mullai (41.47%)	Mimoza Arapi (58.53%)	–	–	Coalition for the Future	74%
Ksamil	Vesel Kociu (42.09%)	Besnik Abedini (57.91%)	–	–	Coalition for the Future	39%
Livadhja	–	–	Irodhis Dalani (62.41%)	Ilia Kalivjoti (MEGA) (37.59%)	PBDNJ	35%
Lukove	Niko Vjeri (26.66%)	Enver Leka (17.99%)	–	Klajdi Mati (LZHK) (22.87%); Vladimir Kumi (Ind.) (32.49%)	Vladimir Kumi (Ind.)	39%
Markat	Ismail Myrtaj (65.23%)	Laze Abdul (34.77%)	–	–	Coalition for the Citizen	71%
Sarandë	Edmond Gjoka (40.77%)	Stefan Çipa (59.23%)	–	–	Coalition for the Future	39%
Xarrë	Romeo Mano (34.52%)	Dhimitër Kote (65.48%)	–	–	Coalition for the Future	41%

Vlorë District
Municipality/Communes	Coalition for the Citizen	Coalition for the Future	Other/Independent	Winner	Voter turnout
Armen	Kliton Haxhiraj (50.57%)	Albert Hoxhaj (49.43%)	–	Coalition for the Citizen	51%
Brataj	Pilo Toto (34.13%)	Ahmet Demaj (31.85%)	Sezai Balilaj (LZHK) (34.02%)	Coalition for the Future	52%
Himarë	Savo Prifti (14.93%)	Jorgo Goro (41.97%)	Vasillaq Bollano (PBDNJ) (39.25%); Dhimitri Llazari (MEGA) (3.84%)	Coalition for the Future	36%
Vranisht	Vilson Lalaj (21.03%)	Simbol Pazaj (53.48%)	Agron Haxhiraj (LZHK) (25.48%)	Coalition for the Future	53%
Kotë	Argjir Gjokaj (47.39%)	Meno Besimaj (52.61%)	–	Coalition for the Future	50%
Novoselë	Rait Llanaj (20.10%)	Jorgo Mukaj (20.53%)	Kanan Shakaj (Ind.) (39.36%); Moisi Meminaj (Ind.) (20.01%)	Kanan Shakaj (Ind.)	44%
Orikum	Arben Suloj (21.29%)	Gëzim Çapoj (50.21%)	Hasan Laba (Ind.) (28.50%)	Coalition for the Future	44%
Qendër	Fredo Berberi (51.52%)	Blerdi Licaj (48.48%)	–	Coalition for the Citizen	39%
Selenicë	Ilia Seferi (44.88%)	Ferdinant Aligjoni (55.12%)	–	Coalition for the Future	33%
Sevaster	Përparim Shametaj(74.91%)	Naim Selamaj (19.55%)	Baftjar Sulcaj (LZHK) (5.54%)	Coalition for the Citizen	49%
Shushicë	Luli Petanaj (45.27%)	Festim Çobaj (14.13%)	Nazif Danaj (40.60%)	Coalition for the Citizen	42%
Vllahinë	Sokol Hodaj (47.74%)	Gëzim Hoxhaj (51.86%)	Alban Çelaj (PKSH) (0.40%)	Coalition for the Future	59%
Vlorë	Ardian Kollozi (44.66%)	Shpëtim Gjika (55.34%)	–	Coalition for the Future	41%

== Countrywide results for Municipal Assemblies ==
Number of votes and percentage for each subject countrywide.

Number	Party name (in Albanian)	Acronym	Coalition	Nr. of Votes	Percentage
1	Lidhja Demokristiane Shqiptare	LDK	Coalition of the Citizen	20.178	1.29%
2	Partia Demokratike e Shqipërisë	PD	Coalition of the Citizen	330.950	21.06%
3	Lëvizja për Drejtësi e Shqiptarëve	LDSH	–	540	0.03%
5	Partia Minoriteti Etnik Grek për të Ardhmen	MEGA	–	4.976	0.32%
6	Partia Ora e Shqipërisë	POSH	Coalition of the Citizen	3.276	0.21%
7	Partia Lëvizja e Legalitetit	PLL	Coalition of the Citizen	37.832	2.41%
8	Partia të Drejtave të Mohuara e Re	PDM e Re	Coalition of the Citizen	3.896	0.25%
9	Partia Personat me Aftësi të Kufizuar	PPAK	Coalition of the Citizen	910	0.06%
10	Bashkimi Liberal Demokratik	BLD	Coalition of the Citizen	26.828	1.71%
11	Partia Balli Kombëtar	PBK	Coalition of the Citizen	20.922	1.33%
12	Aleanca Demokratike	AD	Coalition of the Citizen	32.854	2.09%
13	Partia Balli Kombëtar Demokrat	PBKD	Coalition of the Citizen	15.531	0.99%
14	Partia Komuniste e Shqipërisë	PKSH	–	6.197	0.39%
15	Partia e Punës e Shqipërisë e Riorganizuar	PPSHR	Coalition for the Future	4.066	0.26%
16	Partia Aleanca Popullore	PAP	Coalition of the Citizen	3.136	0.20%
17	Partia për Zhvillim Kombëtar	LZHK	–	21.252	1.35%
18	Partia Agrare Ambjentaliste	PAA	Coalition of the Citizen	30.826	1.96%
19	Partia Konservatore	PKONS	Coalition of the Citizen	2.839	0.18%
20	Partia Bashkimi Demokrat Shqiptar	PBD	Coalition of the Citizen	6.948	0.44%
21	Partia Republikane Shqiptare	PR	Coalition of the Citizen	73.806	4.70%
22	Partia Bashkimi Republikan Shqiptar	PBR	Coalition for the Future	4.211	0.27%
23	Partia Aleanca e Maqedonasve për Integrimin Europian	AMIE	Coalition of the Citizen	2.512	0.16%
24	Lëvizja Socialiste për Integrim	LSI	Coalition of the Citizen	117.707	7.49%
25	Partia Lëvizja Punëtore Shqiptare	PLPSH	–	98	0.01%
26	Partia për Drejtësi, Integrim dhe Unitet	PDIU	Coalition of the Citizen	63.426	4.04%
27	Partia për Mbrojtjen e të Drejtave të Punëtorve të Shqipërisë	PMDPSH	Coalition for the Future	389	0.02%
28	Partia Ardhmëria Shqiptare	PASH	Coalition for the Future	2.503	0.16%
29	Partia Reformatore Demokratike	PRDSH	Coalition for the Future	1.653	0.11%
30	Partia Aleanca Demokristiane	ADK	Coalition of the Citizen	6.140	0.39%
31	Partia Demokrate për Integrim e Prosperitet	PDIP	Coalition for the Future	74	0.00%
32	Partia Socialiste e Moderuar	PSM	Coalition for the Future	5.988	0.38%
33	Partia Demokristiane e Shqipërisë	PDK	Coalition for the Future	47.930	3.05%
34	Partia e Çështjeve Shqiptare	PÇSH	–	366	0.02%
35	Partia Demokracia e Re Europiane	PDRE	Coalition of the Citizen	4.452	0.28%
36	Partia e Pajtimit Kombëtar	PPK	Coalition for the Future	823	0.05%
37	Partia Aleanca Arbnore Kombëtare	AAK	Coalition for the Future	9.227	0.59%
38	Partia e Unitetit Kombëtar	PUK	Coalition for the Future	4.618	0.29%
39	Partia e Gjelbër	PGJ	Coalition for the Future	8.448	0.54%
40	Partia Mendimi i Djathtë Liberal	MDL	–	1.179	0.08%
41	Partia Demokracia Sociale	PDS	Coalition for the Future	53.203	3.39%
43	Partia Kristian Demokrate e Shqipërisë	PKDSH	–	495	0.03%
44	Aleanca Europiane Ekologjike	AEE	Coalition of the Citizen	5.304	0.34%
45	Partia Demokratike e Bashkimit Mysliman të Shqiperisë	PDBMSH	Coalition for the Future	1.726	0.11%
46	Partia Aleanca për Demokraci dhe Solidaritet	ADS	Coalition of the Citizen	3.062	0.19%
47	Partia Socialdemokrate	PSD	Coalition for the Future	43.828	2.79%
48	Partia Bashkimi Popullor i Pensionistëve Shqiptar	PBPPSH	Coalition for the Future	523	0.03%
49	Partia për Mbrojtjen e të Drejtave të Emigrantëve	PMDE	Coalition for the Future	860	0.05%
50	Partia Socialiste e Vërtetë 91	PSV 91	Coalition for the Future	23.617	1.50%
51	Partia Socialiste e Shqipërisë	PSSH	Coalition for the Future	432.823	27.55%
52	Partia Ligj dhe Drejtësi	PLiDr	Coalition for the Future	7.782	0.50%
53	Partia Rruga e Lirisë	PRRL	Coalition for the Future	1.355	0.09%
54	Partia Bashkimi për të Drejtat e Njeriut	PBDNJ	–	40.710	2.59%
55	Partia G99	G99	Coalition for the Future	15.265	0.97%
56	Partia Toleranca e Re e Shqipërisë	PTR	Coalition for the Future	700	0.04%
		Total	Coalition for the Citizen	813.335	51.77%
		Total	Coalition for the Future	671.612	42.75%
		Total	Outside the Coalitions	75.813	4.82%
		Total	Candidates Proposed by Voters	10.336	0.66%
		Grand Total	Votes for 373 Electoral Units	1.571.096	100%

== Reactions ==
- Sali Berisha, prime minister and leader of the Democratic Party of Albania, declared that the elections went well.
- The Organization for Security and Co-operation in Europe declared the electoral system needs immediate reforms.

== Partial Elections ==
Partial elections were held in September and November 2013 for mayors of the following communes: Korçë in Korçë District, Dardhas in Korçë District, Rrethina in Shkodër District, and Karbunarë in Lushnje District.

== See also ==
- Coalition for the Future
- Coalition for the Citizen
- Politics of Albania
- Parliamentary Elections of 2013
- Partial Local Elections of 2013
