= Administrative units of Tirana =

Municipality of Tirana boundaries in Albania

Tirana consists of 24 administrative units (Albanian: njësi administrative).

== Administrative division ==
Borders of Urban Tirana's 11 Municipal Units

Below are the original 11 municipal units (Albanian: njesi bashkiake) of Tirana that were in effect until 2015. These were joined by 13 more divisions effective June 2015 following the 2015 Administrative-Territorial Division Reform of Albania totaling 24 administrative units for Tirana:

=== Urban Tirana ===
Municipality	Neighborhood	Inhabitants
Tirana 1	Ali Demi	51,264
Tirana 2	Bulevardi Bajram Curri, Bulevardi Zhan D'Ark, Qyteti Studenti, Sauku, Zona 1	81,195
Tirana 3	Brryli, Xhamlliku	44,397
Tirana 4	Kinostudio, Babrru, Allias	65,357
Tirana 5	Blloku, Selita, Tirana e Re	85,579
Tirana 6	Kombinati, Yzberisht	77,620
Tirana 7	21 Dhjetori, Ish-Fusha e Aviacionit	74,552
Tirana 8	Selvia, Medreseja e Tiranës	41,421
Tirana 9	Lagja e Trenit, Brraka, Don Bosko (part)	64,014
Tirana 10	Central Tirana	27,731
Tirana 11	Lapraka, Instituti, Don Bosko (part)	65,056
Tirana 12		15,699
Tirana 13		13,565
Tirana 14		?
Totally		707,450

=== Rural Tirana ===
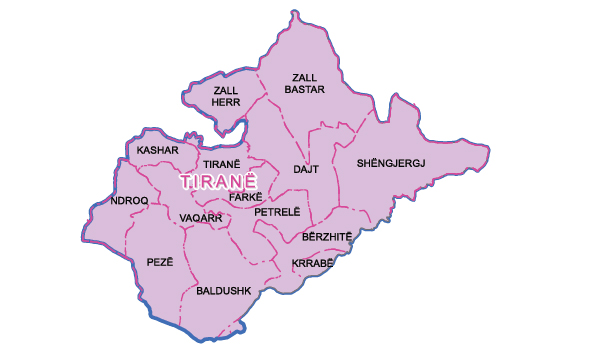
Administrative Units of the Municipality of Tirana, post-2015

Following the 2015 Administrative-Territorial Division Reform, 13 new rural administrative units were added to the new Municipality of Tirana. The new divisions and their corresponding villages are as follows:

- Petrelë
  - Petrelë, Mullet, Stërmas, Picall, Shënkoll, Gurrë e Madhe, Gurrë e Vogel, Daias, Barbas, Fikas, Mangull, Qeha, Shytaj, Hekal, Kryezi, Percëllesh, Durishtë
- Farkë
  - Farkë e Madhe, Farkë e Vogël, Lundër, Mjull Bathore, Sauk, Selitë
- Dajt
  - Linzë, Shishtufinë, Tujan, Brrar, Ferraj, Priskë e Madhe, Surrel, Lanabreges, Shkallë, Qafmollë, Darshen, Selbë, Murth
- Zall-Bastar
  - Zall-Bastar, Bastar i Mesëm, Bastar – Murriz, Vilëz, Zall-Mner, Mner i Sipërm, Bulçesh, Zall Dajt, Besh, Dajt, Shëngjin i Vogël, Selitë Mali
- Bërzhitë
  - Ibë, Bërzhitë, Dobresh, Ibë e Poshtme, Pëllumbas, Mihajas-Cirmë, Kus, Fravesh, Kllojkë, Pashkashesh, Lugë-Shalqizë, Rozaverë
- Krrabë
  - Krrabë, Fshatrat; Mushqeta, Skuterë
- Baldushk
  - Baldushk, Mumajes, Fushas, Balshaban, Shpatë, Isufmuçaj, Mustafakoçaj, Koçaj, Kakunj, Vesqi, Parret, Shënkoll, Vrap, Shpat i Sipërm
- Shëngjergj
  - Shëngjergj, Verri, Urë, Burimas, Shëngjin, Façesh, Bizë, Fage, Parpujë, Vakumone, Domje, Derje
- Vaqarr
  - Vaqarr, Allgjatë, Arbanë, Bulticë, Damjan-Fortuzaj, Gropaj, Lalm, Prush, Vishaj, Sharrë
- Kashar
  - Kashar, Yzberish, Mëzez, Yrshek, Katundi i Ri, Kus, Mazrek
- Pezë
  - Pezë e Madhe, Pezë Helmës, Pezë e Vogël, Varosh, Maknor, Dorëz, Gror, Grecë, Pajanë, Gjysylkanë
- Ndroq
  - Fshatrat; Ndroq, Zbarqe, Kërçukje, Zhurje, Lagje e Re, Pinet, Sauqet, Çalabërzezë, Shesh, Grebllesh, Mënik
- Zall-Herr
  - Zall - Herr, Dritas, Çerkezë-Morinë, Qinam, Kallmet, Herraj, Pinar, Priskë e Vogël, Radhesh

== See also ==
- Neighborhoods of Tirana
