= Neighborhoods of Tirana =

The first neighborhood in Tirana was Bam. The three oldest neighborhoods are Mujos, and Pazari located between the geographical centre and Elbasan Street on either side of the Lanë, and Brraka located east of Zog I Boulevard around modern Haxhi Hysen Dalliu Street.

Another historical street was former Rruga e Pishes, modern Tefta Tashko-Koco Street.

Other neighborhoods include:

- Laprakë or Lapraka, located on the northwestern side of Tirana.
- Kombinat, located on the southwestern side of Tirana.
- Xhamlliku, located on the eastern side of the city.
- Allias, located on the northeastern side of Tirana.
- Tirana e Re (New Tirana), which encloses a part known as "Ish-Blloku" or "Blloku" (a term that is commonly used to identify the former block of residences of the Albanian Communist leaders). This neighborhood is the most modern part of Tirana. It is distinguished by many coffeehouses, bars, restaurants, etc. It is located in the southern side of Tirana and borders Kombinat and the center of the city.
- Ali Demi, located on the southeastern side of the city.

== See also ==
- Administrative units of Tirana
