= 2013 Albanian local elections =

- 1 September 2013; 3 November 2013

Albanian partial local elections of 2013 were held on September 1, 2013, and November 3, 2013. Following the Parliamentary Elections in June, and the new Albanian Government composition announced on July 31, 2013, there were reelections in four municipalities, three of them rural.
The elections were administrated by the Central Election Commission of Albania.

== September 1, 2013 ==
- Dardhas Municipality in Korçë District

Turnout: 60,64% (over 50% of which were women).
Results:

1. Genci Hamollari representing Socialist Movement for Integration, 1138 votes
2. Gentian Pere representing Democratic Party, 412 votes
- Rrethina Municipality in Shkodër District

Turnout: 34% (of which less than 38% were women).
Results:

1. Luan Harusha representing Socialist Party, 4411 votes
2. Ridvan Guri representing Democratic Party, 1402 votes

== November 3, 2013 ==
- Korçë Municipality in Korçë District

Turnout: 30,92% (over 45% of which were women)
Results:

1. Sotiraq Filo, representing the coalition "Alliance for the European Albania" (Albanian: Aleanca për Shqipërinë Europiane), consisting of Socialist Party of Albania and Socialist Movement for Integration, 15953 votes
2. Sotiraq Stratobërdha, representing the coalition "Alliance for the Citizenry of Korça" (Albanian: Aleanca për Qytetarinë Korçare), consisting of Democratic Party of Albania and Republican Party of Albania, 5283 votes
- Karbunarë Municipality in Lushnje District

Turnout: 51,14% (around 44% of which were women)
Results:

1. Mynyr Shehu, representing the coalition "Alliance for Karbunare" (Albanian: Aleanca për Karbunarën), consisting of Democratic Party of Albania and Republican Party of Albania, 864 votes
2. Bektash Nezha, representing the coalition "Alliance for the European Albania" (Albanian: Aleanca për Shqipërinë Europiane), consisting of Socialist Party of Albania and Socialist Movement for Integration, 1173 votes

== See also ==
- 2011 Albanian local elections
- 2013 Albanian parliamentary election
