= Coalition for the Future =

2011 Albanian political coalition

Aleanca për të Ardhmen (English: Coalition for the Future) was a coalition for the Albanian local elections of 2011. The alliance existed of:

Party name (in Albanian)	Acronym	Chairman
Partia Socialiste e Shqipërisë	PS	Edi Rama
Partia Demokristiane e Shqipërisë	PDK	Nard Ndoka
Partia Socialdemokrate e Shqipërisë	PSD	Skënder Gjinushi
Partia Demokracia Sociale e Shqipërisë	PDS	Paskal Milo
Partia Ligj dhe Drejtësi	PLIDR	Spartak Ngjela
Grupimi 99	G99	Ervin Mete
Partia Socialiste e Vërtetë 91	PSV 91	Petro Koçi
Partia e Gjelbër e Shqipërisë	PGJ	Edlir Petanaj
Partia Rruga e Lirisë	PRRL	Kurt Kola
Aleanca Arbnore Kombëtare	AAK	Gjet Ndoj
Partia Socialiste e Moderuar	PSM	Gjergj Koja
Partia e Mbrojtjes së të Drejtave të Punëtorëve e Shqipërisë	PMDPSH	Kadri Isufaj
Partia Bashkimi Republikan	PBR	Zane Llazi
Partia Reformatore Demokratike Shqiptare	PRDSH	Skënder Halili
Partia Ardhmëria Shqiptare	PASH	Emin Subashi
Partia Bashkimi Popullor i Pensionistëve Shqiptar	PBPPSH	Selami Jenisheri
Partia për Mbrojtjen e të Drejtave të Emigrantëve	PMDE	Ymer Kurti
Partia e Punës e Shqipërisë e Riorganizuar	PPSHR	Marko Dajti
Partia Uniteti Kombëtar	PUK	Idajet Beqiri
Partia Demokrate për Integrim dhe Prosperitet	PDIP	Halim Sehitaj
Partia Toleranca e Re e Shqipërisë	PTR	Avdi Keçi
Partia Demokratike e Bashkimit Musliman Shqiptar	PDBMSH	Sabri Jaçaj
Partia e Pajtimit Kombëtar	PPK	Spartak Dobi

== See also ==
- Coalition of the Citizen
