= Besim =

Besim is an Albanian masculine given name. It means "belief" or "faith" in Albanian. It is also used in Turkey and less commonly in Bosnia and Herzegovina.

Notable people with the name include:

== People ==
- Besim Ömer Akalın (1862–1941), Turkish physician
- Besim Bokshi (1930–2014), Albanian poet
- Besim Dina (born 1971), Albanian comedian and television presenter
- Besim Durmuş (born 1965), Turkish footballer
- Besim Fagu (1925–1999), Albanian football player
- Besim Jazexhiu (died 2022), Albanian dancer and choreographer
- Besim Kabashi (1976–2011), Albanian kickboxer
- Besim Kuka, Albanian politician
- Besim Kunić (born 1986), Swedish footballer
- Besim Leka (born 1994), Albanian football player
- Besim Mala (1971–2000), Kosovo Liberation Army soldier
- Besim Muzaqi (born 1979), Kosovar politician
- Besim Sahatçiu (1935–2005), Albanian director
- Besim Šerbečić (born 1998), Bosnian football player
- Besim Tibuk (born 1946), Turkish businessman and former politician
- Besim Üstünel (1927–2015), Turkish economist and politician
