= Bashkimi =

Bashkimi (Albanian for "unity") may refer to:

== Name ==
- Bashkim, male personal name

== Newspapers ==
- Bashkimi (Democratic Front newspaper), founded 1943
- Bashkimi (PPSHR newspaper), organ of the Reorganised Party of Labour of Albania (PPSHR)

== Politics ==
- Unity for Human Rights Party (Partia Bashkimi për të Drejtat e Njeriut), a centrist political party in Albania
- Liberal Democratic Union (Albania) (Bashkimi Liberal Demokrat)
- Albanian Democratic Union Party (Partia Bashkimi Demokrat Shqiptar), a political party in Albania led by Ylber Valteri
- Albanian Republican United Party (Partia Bashkimi Republikan Shqiptar, PBRSH), a political party in Albania
- Union for Victory Coalition (Bashkimi për Fitoren), a coalition of political parties in Albania
- Labour Youth Union of Albania (Bashkimi i Rinisë së Punës së Shqipërisë), a youth organization of the Party of Labour of Albania
- Unification for Changes (Bashkimi për Ndryshim), a coalition in the Albanian parliamentary elections of 2009

== Societies ==
- Society for the Unity of the Albanian Language (Shoqnia e Bashkimit të Gjuhës Shqipe)

== Sport ==
- FK Bashkimi, a football club established in 1947, refounded in 2011
- Bashkimi Prizren, or KB Bashkimi, a basketball club created in 1945
- Bashkimi Shkodran, one of the six original members in the 1930 Albanian Superliga
- Bashkimi Elbasan, name of a football club from 1933 to 1949
- KF Bashkimi Koretin, a football club established in 1974
- KF Bashkimi Shipol, defunct football club established in 1990
