= Shkodër (disambiguation) =

Shkodër or Shkodra is a city and municipality in the northwest of Albania.

Shkodër or Shkodra may also refer to:

- Shkodër County, first-level administrative division of Albania
- Shkodër District, former administrative division of Albania
- Lake of Shkodër, the largest lake in Southern Europe

== See also ==
- Scutari Vilayet
