= Tirana 6 =

Administrative unit of Tirana, Albania

Njesinë no.6

Tirana 6 (Albanian: Njësinë No. 6 ne Tiranë) is one of the 24 administrative units in Tirana.

== Neighborhoods ==
- Kombinati
- Yzberishi
