= Darshen =

- Village
- Darshen
- Location within Albania
- Coordinates: 41°18′N 19°59′E
- Country: Albania
- County: Tirana
- Municipality: Tirana (Bashkia Tiranë)
- Administrative unit: Dajt (Njësia Administrative Dajt)
- Elevation: 500 m (1,600 ft)
- Time zone: UTC+1 (CET)
  - Summer (DST): UTC+2 (CEST)
- Postal Code: Darshen, Dajt, Tiranë 1040, Shqiperi
- Area Code: 04

Darshen is a village in the former municipality of Dajt in Tirana County, Albania. At the 2015 local government reform it became part of the municipality Tirana.
