= Sukaj =

Sukaj is an Albanian surname. Notable people with the surname include:

- Adrian Sukaj (born 1967), Albanian footballer
- Bashkim Sukaj (born 1992), Swiss football player of Kosovan-Albanian origin
- Xhevahir Sukaj (born 1987), Albanian football forward
