= Rripë =

- Village
- Location within Albania
- Coordinates: 41.5490°N 20.0233°E
- Country: Albania
- County: Dibër
- Municipality: Klos
- Administrative unit: Gurrë

Population
  - Total: 100 vet kan ngel
- Time zone: UTC+1 (CET)
  - Summer (DST): UTC+2 (CEST)

Rripë is a village in the former municipality of Gurrë, Albania. Klos.
