= Bashkim =

- Gender: male

Origin
- Origin: Albanian
- Meaning: unity
- Region of origin: Albania

Bashkim is a masculine Albanian given name, which means "unity" in Albanian.

== People ==
- Bashkim Ajdini (born 1992), German footballer
- Bashkim Dedja (born 1970), Albanian judge
- Bashkim Fino (1962–2021), Albanian politician and prime minister
- Bashkim Gazidede (1952–2008), Albanian politician
- Bashkim Jashari (born 1977), Kosovo Albanian three-star general
- Bashkim Kadrii (born 1991), Danish football player
- Bashkim Kopliku (1943–2020), Albanian politician
- Bashkim Muhedini (1949–2022), Albanian association football player
- Bashkim Pitarka, Albanian diplomat
- Bashkim Shehu (born 1955), Albanian writer
- Bashkim Sukaj (born 1992), Swiss footballer
- Bashkim Suka (1979-1999) Kosovo Albanian military commander

== See also ==
- Bashkimi (disambiguation)
