= Party for Defence of Workers Rights =

Political party in Albania

- Leader: Kadri Mehmet Isufaj
- Merged into: Parties of the Social Spectrum of Albania - National Unity Party

Party for Defence of Workers Rights (in Albanian: Partia për Mbrojtjen e të Drejtave të Punëtorëve) is a political party in Albania. The party chairman is Kadri Mehmet Isufaj.

Ahead of the 2005 elections the party joined the coalition "Parties of the Social Spectrum of Albania - National Unity Party". The coalition presented Isufaj as its candidate in the single-member constituency Zone 43, near Tirana. He received 44 votes (0.3%).
