= Tirana 4 =

Administrative unit of Tirana, Albania

Njesinë no.4

Tirana 4 (Albanian: Njësinë No. 4 ne Tiranë) is one of the 24 administrative units in Tirana.

== Neighborhoods ==
- Allias
- Tufinë
- Porcelan
- Kinostudio
