= Social Albanian Parties – National Unity Party =

- Leader: Idajet Beqiri
- Founded: 2005

Social Albanian Parties and National Unity Party (in Albanian: Partitë Shqiptare Sociale dhe Partia e Unitetit Kombëtar, abbreviated PSHS-PUK) is a coalition of political parties registered ahead of the 2005 elections in Albania. The coalition did not win any seats. On the proportional list PSHS-PUK got 0.2% of the votes.

The coalition consists of :

- National Unity Party (Partia e Unitetit Kombėtar)
- Albanian Workers Movement Party (Partia Lëvizja Punëtore Shqiptare)
- Environmental Party (Partia Ambientaliste)
- Party for Defence of Workers Rights (Partia për Mbrojtjen e të Drejtave të Punëtorëve)

The coalition is led by Idajet Beqiri of PUK.
