= Tirana 11 =

Administrative unit of Tirana, Albania

Njesinë no.11

Tirana 11 (Albanian: Njësinë No. 11 ne Tiranë) is one of the 24 administrative units in Tirana.

== Neighborhoods ==
- Lapraka
- Instituti
