= Tirana 3 =

Administrative unit of Tirana, Albania

Njesinë no.3

Tirana 3 (Albanian: Njësinë No. 3 ne Tiranë) is one of the 24 administrative units in Tirana.
