= People's Alliance Party (Albania) =

Political party in Albania

- Leader: Fatjon Softa
- Merged into: Movement for National Development - Leka I Zogu

People's Alliance Party (in Albanian: Partia Aleanca Popullore) is a political party in Albania led by engineer Fatjon Softa, who was police chief in Tirana between 1992 and 1996. Softa became party president in 2002.

In the 2005 parliamentary elections, the party joined the Movement for National Development coalition. Softa stood as the coalition candidate in the single-member constituency Zone 34, Qarku, Tirana. From February 2007, he is member of the local council of Tirana and the president of the municipality for public order and civil protection in the local council of Tirana.
