= Ish-Blloku =

Upmarket area in Tirana, Albania

Coordinates: 41°19′15″N 19°48′59″E

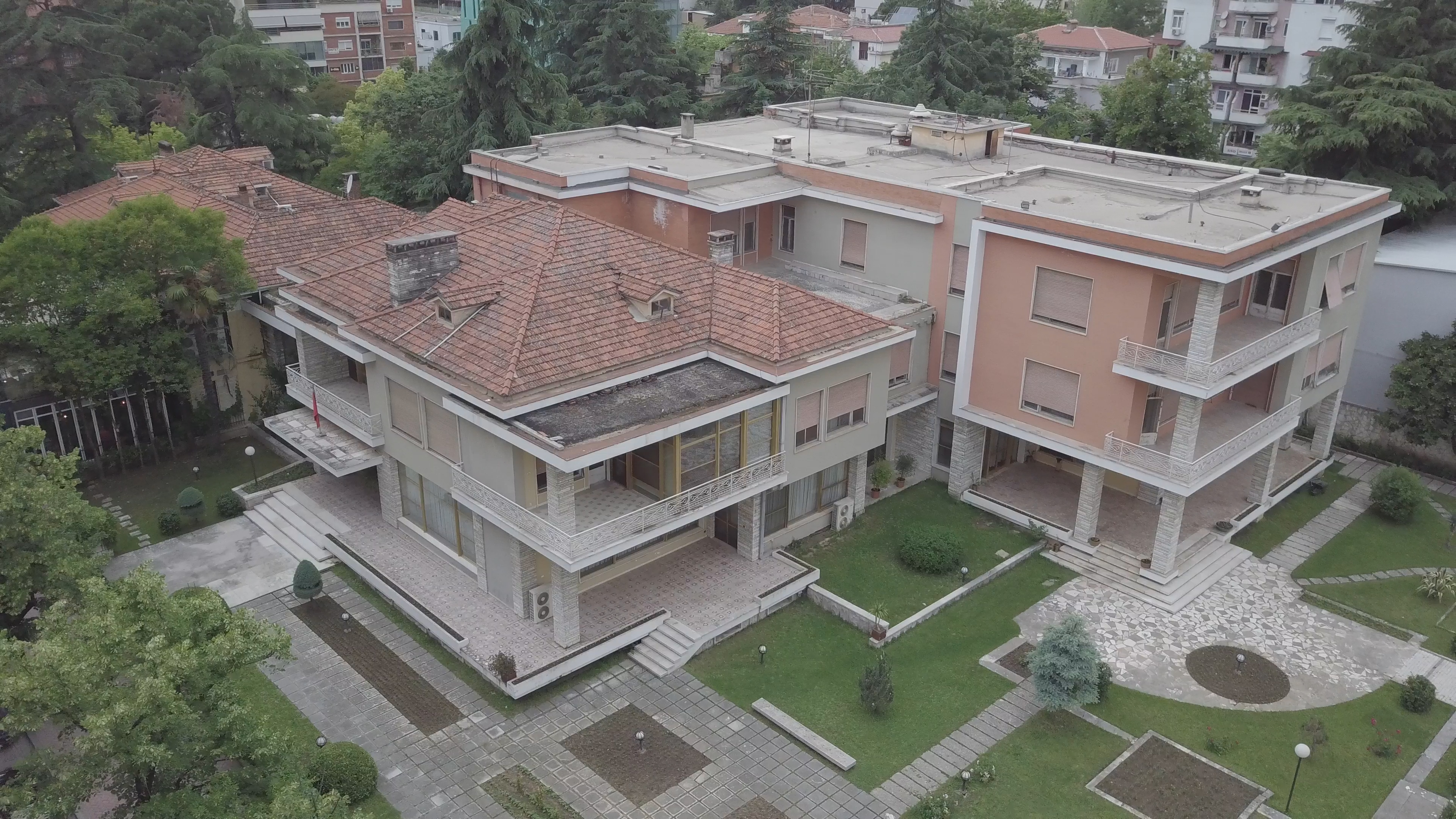
Former residence of Enver Hoxha.

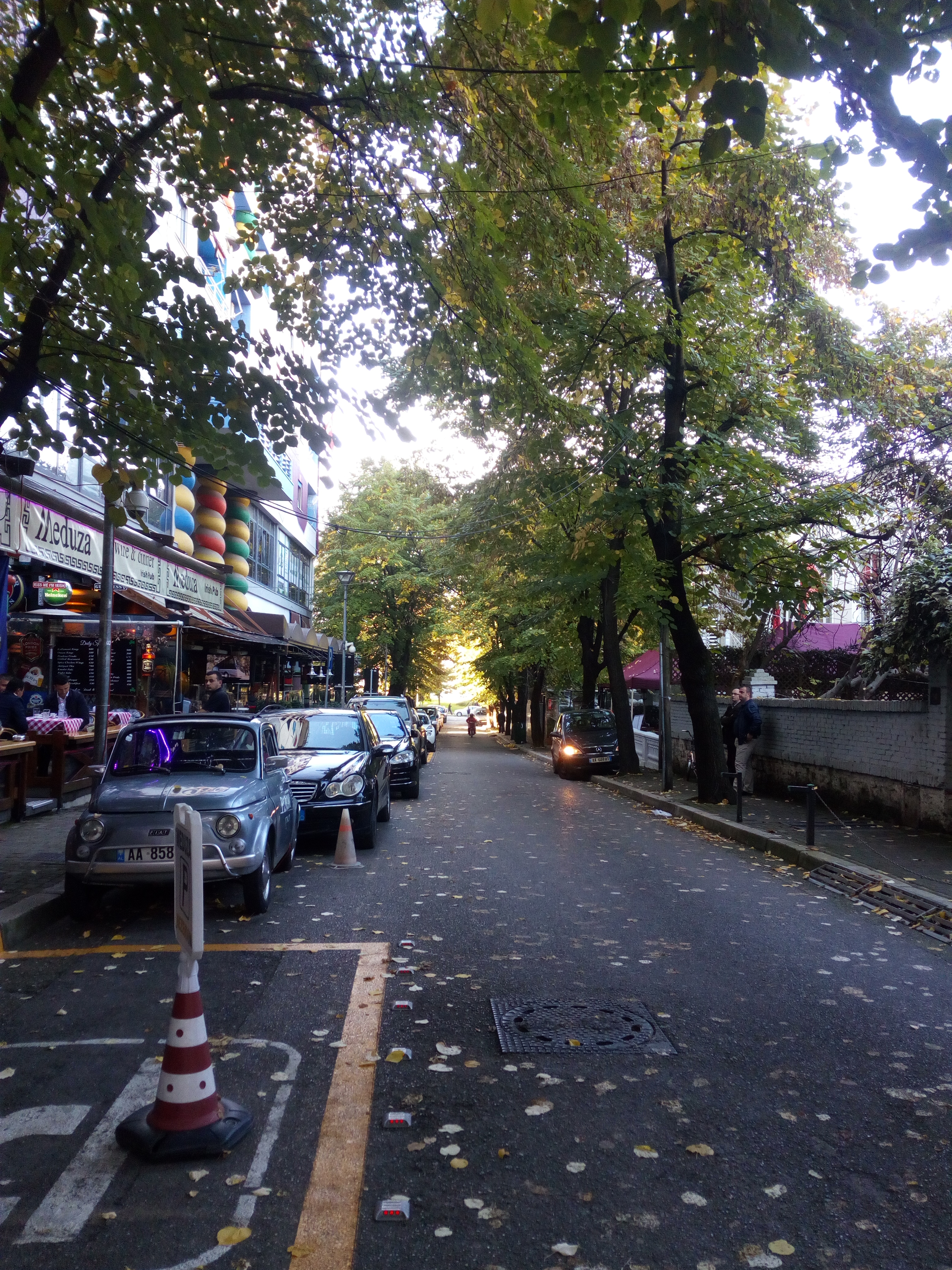
The Mustafa Matohiti Street in Blloku.

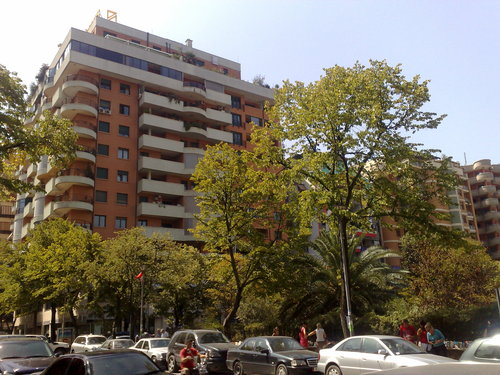
Since 1991, a dramatic growth of new developments has taken place, with many new exclusive flats and apartments.

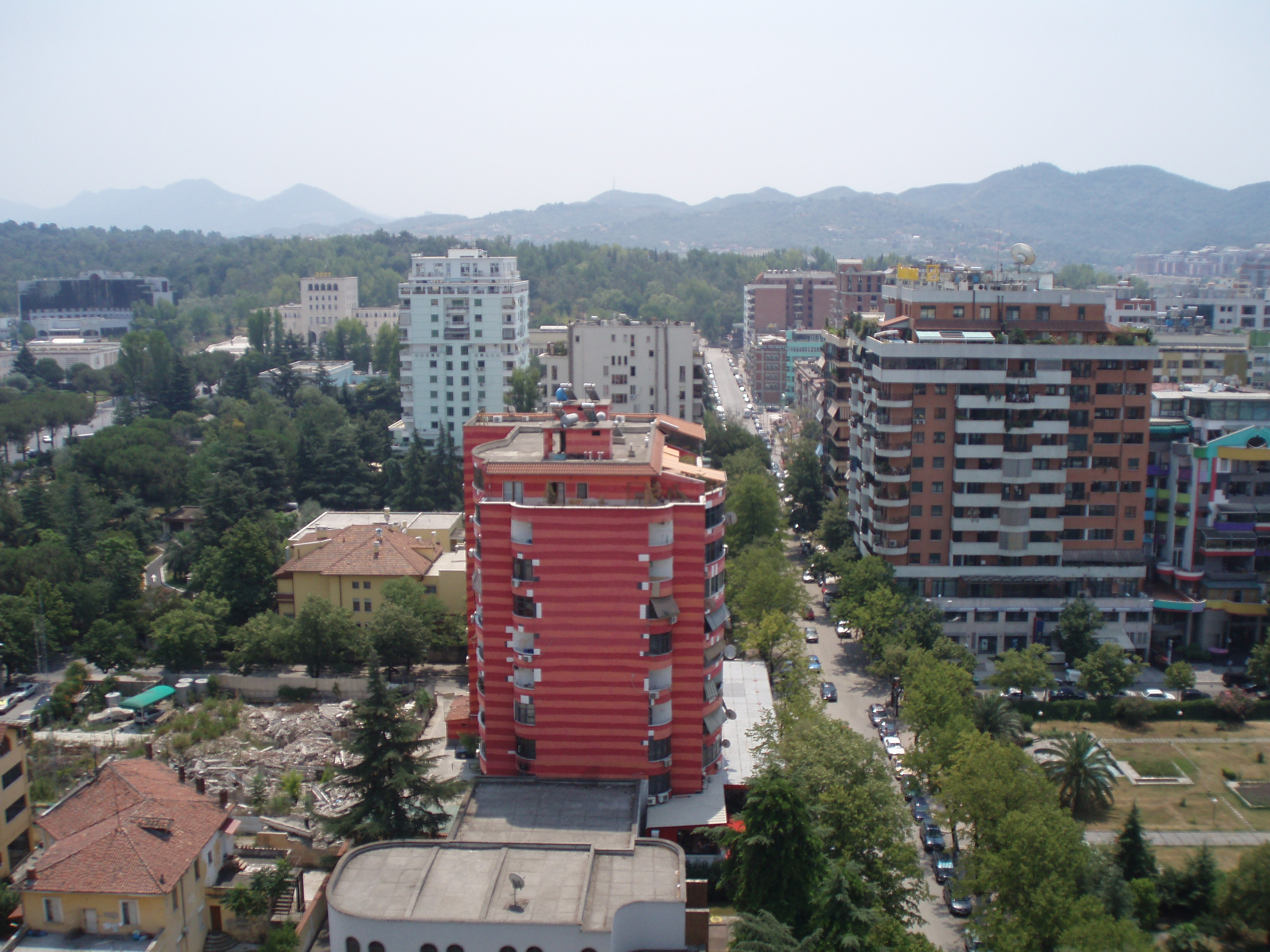
Blloku as viewed from Sky Tower

Ish-Blloku (English: Ex-Block), commonly Blloku (English: Block), is an upmarket area in Tirana, Albania. It widely known as an entertainment destination with its boutiques, shops, restaurants, trendy bars, pubs, and cafes. The area is part of the neighbourhood of Tirana e Re in southwestern Tirana. During the peak summer months, its trendy bars transfer along the Albanian Riviera.

It became very attractive after the fall of communism in Albania, because during the communist period it was a restricted residential area for the members of the Albanian politburo. Ordinary Albanians were not be allowed in. On most maps, the area was unmarked. In Blloku one can still find the residence of Albania's communist leader Enver Hoxha.

Since the fall of communism in Albania, a dramatic growth of new developments has taken place, with many new exclusive flats and apartments. Ish-Blloku has been called the "playground of the young Albanian elite".

Blloku is quite a small, walking neighborhood, easily accessible from different parts of Tirana. The entrance of Blloku is only 10–15 minutes by foot from the city centre of Tirana.

The first international fast food chain (KFC) in Albania, were also opened at Ish-Blloku and Tirana East Gate.

- Landmarks in Tirana
- Neighborhoods of Tirana

== Further information ==
- Williams, Sean (12 September 2014). "Albania's Block party: Dancing away the dictator's legacy". CNN.
- Albania Fashion Street Blog
- Tirana Club Zone
- Till'late Albania
- Radio Stations in Tirana
