= Tirana 1 =

Administrative unit of Tirana, Albania

Njesinë no.1

Tirana 1 (Albanian: Njësinë No. 1 ne Tiranë) is one of the 24 administrative units in Tirana.

== Neighborhoods ==
- Ali Demi
