= Tirana 2 =

Administrative unit of Tirana, Albania

Njesinë no.1

Tirana 2 (Albanian: Njësinë No. 2 ne Tiranë) is one of the 24 administrative units in Tirana.

== Neighborhoods ==
- Qyteti Student
- Pazari i Ri
