= Besim Jazexhiu =

Albanian dancer and choreographer (died 2022)

Besim Jazexhiu (1940s – 3 July 2022) was an Albanian dancer and choreographer.

== Career ==
He began to work as a dancer in 1961 at the Opera Theatre. During this early period, in addition to dancing in the ballet troupe, he performed characters in various ballets including "Halili and Hajria" composed by Tish Daija and said to be the first Albanian ballet, "Delina", "Laurenca", "Fadeta", "Sherazadja", and "Peter and the Wolf". In 1965 he started working as a soloist in the Army Ensemble and then from 1968 as a soloist in the People's Ensemble. In this period, he developed folk dances in the Folk Ensemble and for many amateur artistic troupes. After the 1990s, he also worked in Kosovo and North Macedonia.
