= Besim Kuka =

Albanian politician

Besim Kuka is the current candidate for Dajt municipality for Democratic Party of Albania in the local elections of 2011. He was chosen in 2002 as leader of Dajt.

== Shooting incident ==
On April 1, 2011 Kuka was shot four times with a shotgun, but was not injured.
