= National Unity Party (Albania) =

Political party in Albania

- Leader: Idajet Beqiri
- Founded: 1991
- Merged into: Parties of the Social Spectrum of Albania - National Unity Party
- Ideology: Albanian nationalism
- Political position: Far-right

The National Unity Party (in Albanian: Partia e Unitetit Kombëtar) is a political party in Albania. It was founded in March 1991. It is an ultra-nationalist party and supports for pan-Albanian confederation. Ahead of the 2005 parliamentary elections, PUK formed a coalition together with three other parties grouped in the "Parties of the Social Spectrum of Albania". The coalition contested the elections as Parties of the Social Spectrum of Albania - National Unity Party (PSSSH-PUK). PSSSH-PUK failed to win any seats.

The party is led by Idajet Beqiri, who is also the chairman.
