= Albanian Workers Movement Party =

Political party in Albania

- Leader: Shefqet Musaraj
- Founded: 2000
- Merged into: Parties of the Social Spectrum of Albania – National Unity Party
- Political position: Left-wing

Albanian Workers Movement Party (in Albanian: Partia Lëvizja Punëtore Shqiptare, abbreviated PLPSH) is a left-wing political party in Albania. The party was established in 2000. It is led by Shefqet Musaraj. In the 2001 parliamentary elections the party received 0.22% of the votes.

Ahead of the 2005 elections, PLPSH joined the coalition Parties of the Social Spectrum of Albania – National Unity Party.
