= Tirana 7 =

Administrative unit of Tirana, Albania

Njesinë no.7

Tirana 7 (Albanian: Njësinë No. 7 ne Tiranë) is one of the 24 administrative units in Tirana.
