= Tirana 9 =

Administrative unit in Tirana

Njësia No.9

Tirana 9 (Albanian: Njësia No. 9 në Tiranë) is one of the 24 administrative units in Tirana.
