= Tirana 10 =

Administrative unit of Tirana, Albania

- Mini Bashkia
- Flag Seal

- Location of Tirana 10 within Tirana.
- Country: Albania
- Mini Bashkia: 10

Area
  - Total: 1.9 km^{2} (0.73 sq mi)

Population
  - Total: 29.000

Tirana 10 (Albanian: Njësinë No. 10 ne Tiranë) is one of the 11 administrative units in Tirana, Albania.

== See also ==
- Tirana
- Administrative units of Tirana
