= Unification for Changes =

Unification for Changes (Albanian: Bashkimi per Ndryshim) was a coalition in the Albanian parliamentary elections of 2009.

== Coalition ==
- Socialist Party of Albania (PS)
- Social Democratic Party of Albania (PSD)
- G99
- Unity for Human Rights Party (PBDNJ)
- Social Democracy Party of Albania (PDS)
