= Shkodër District =

Defunct (2000) Albanian administrative area

Shkodër District Rrethi i Shkodrës
- Former district
- Coordinates: 42°5′N 19°38′E
- Country: Albania
- Dissolved: 2000
- Seat: Shkodër

Area
  - Total: 1,631 km^{2} (630 sq mi)

Population (2001)
  - Total: 185,794
  - Density: 113.9/km^{2} (295.0/sq mi)
- Time zone: UTC+1 (CET)
  - Summer (DST): UTC+2 (CEST)

Shkodër District (Albanian: Rrethi i Shkodrës, short name: Shkodër, variants: Rrethi Shkodër and Shkodra) was one of the 36 districts of Albania, which were dissolved in July 2000 and replaced by 12 newly created counties. It had a population of 185,794 in 2001, and an area of 1,631 km^{2} (630 sq mi). It is in the north of the country, and its capital was the city of Shkodër. Its territory is now part of Shkodër County: the municipalities of Shkodër and Vau i Dejës.

The area includes significant tourist attractions, such as Rozafa Castle (fortress of Shkodra); one of the biggest and most famous castles in Albania, with the 13–14th century St. Stephen's Church in its court, later converted to a mosque; the Ottoman-era Historical Museum building (1815); and the National Photo Gallery.

== Administrative divisions ==
The district consisted of the following municipalities:

- Ana e Malit
- Bërdicë
- Bushat
- Dajç
- Guri i Zi
- Hajmel
- Postribë
- Pult
- Rrethinat
- Shalë
- Shkodër
- Shllak
- Shosh
- Temal
- Vau i Dejës
- Velipojë
- Vig-Mnelë
