= Tirana 8 =

Administrative unit of Tirana, Albania

Njesinë no.8

Tirana 8 (Albanian: Njësinë No. 8 ne Tiranë) is one of the 24 administrative units in Tirana.
