= Albanian Affairs Party =

Albanian political party

Albanian Affairs Party (in Albanian: Partia e Çështjeve Shqiptare) is a political party in Albania, led by Bujar Shurdhi.
