= Ervin Mete =

Albanian economist and politician (born 1983)

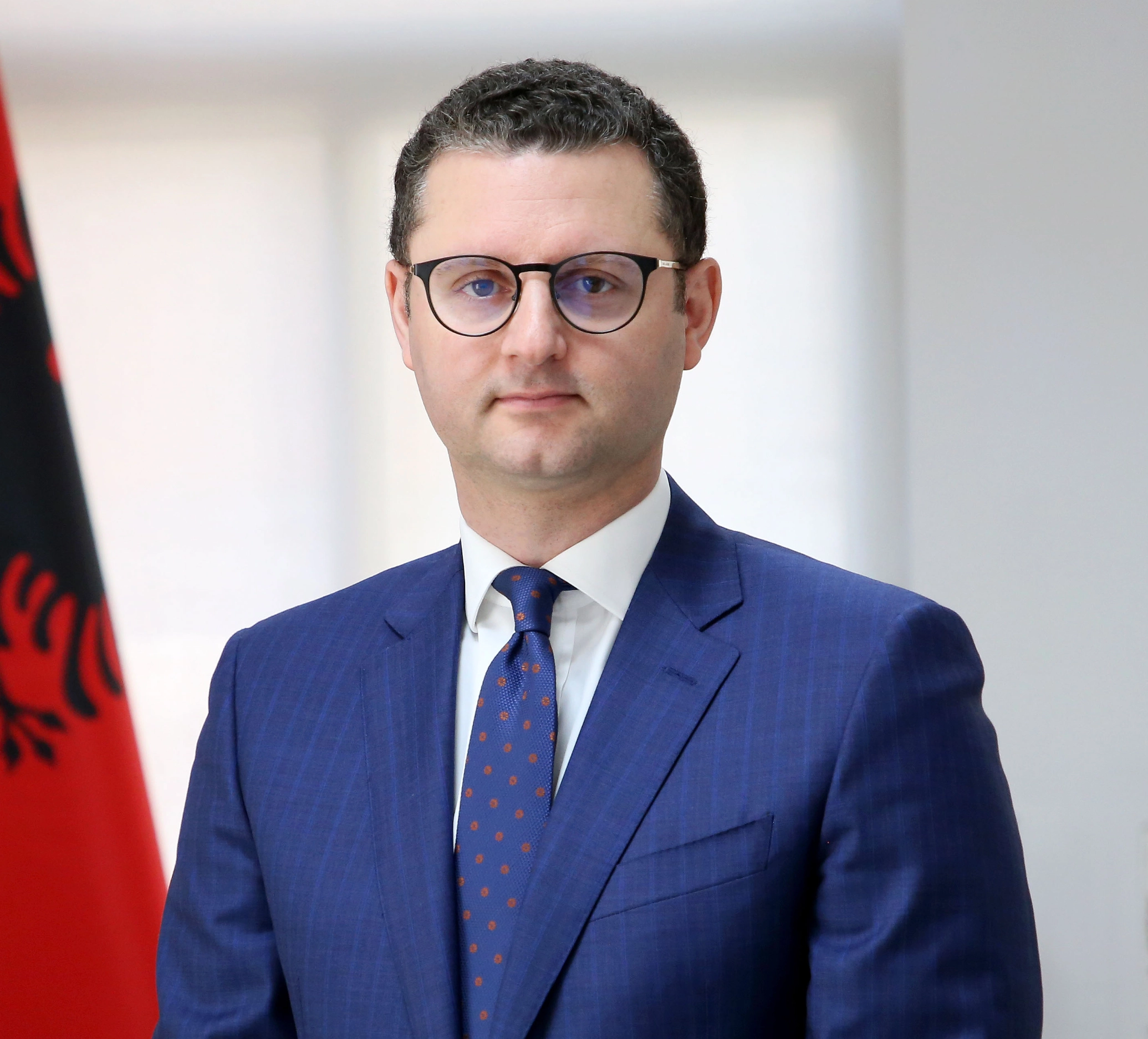

Minister of Finance
- In office 14 September 2023 – 30 July 2024
- Prime Minister: Edi Rama
- Preceded by: Delina Ibrahimaj
- Succeeded by: Petrit Malaj

Personal details
- Born: 13 September 1983 (age 43) Ersekë, PSR Albania
- Party: People's Socialist Republic of Albania
- Education: University of Tirana (BA); Harvard Law School (LLM); London School of Economics (MA)

Ervin Mete (born 13 September 1983) is an Albanian economist and former government minister. He was the Minister of Finance of Albania from 2023 to 2024.

Political offices
Preceded by Delina Ibrahimaj	Minister of Finance; 2023–2024	Succeeded by Petrit Malajj
