= Gurrë =

- Administrative unit
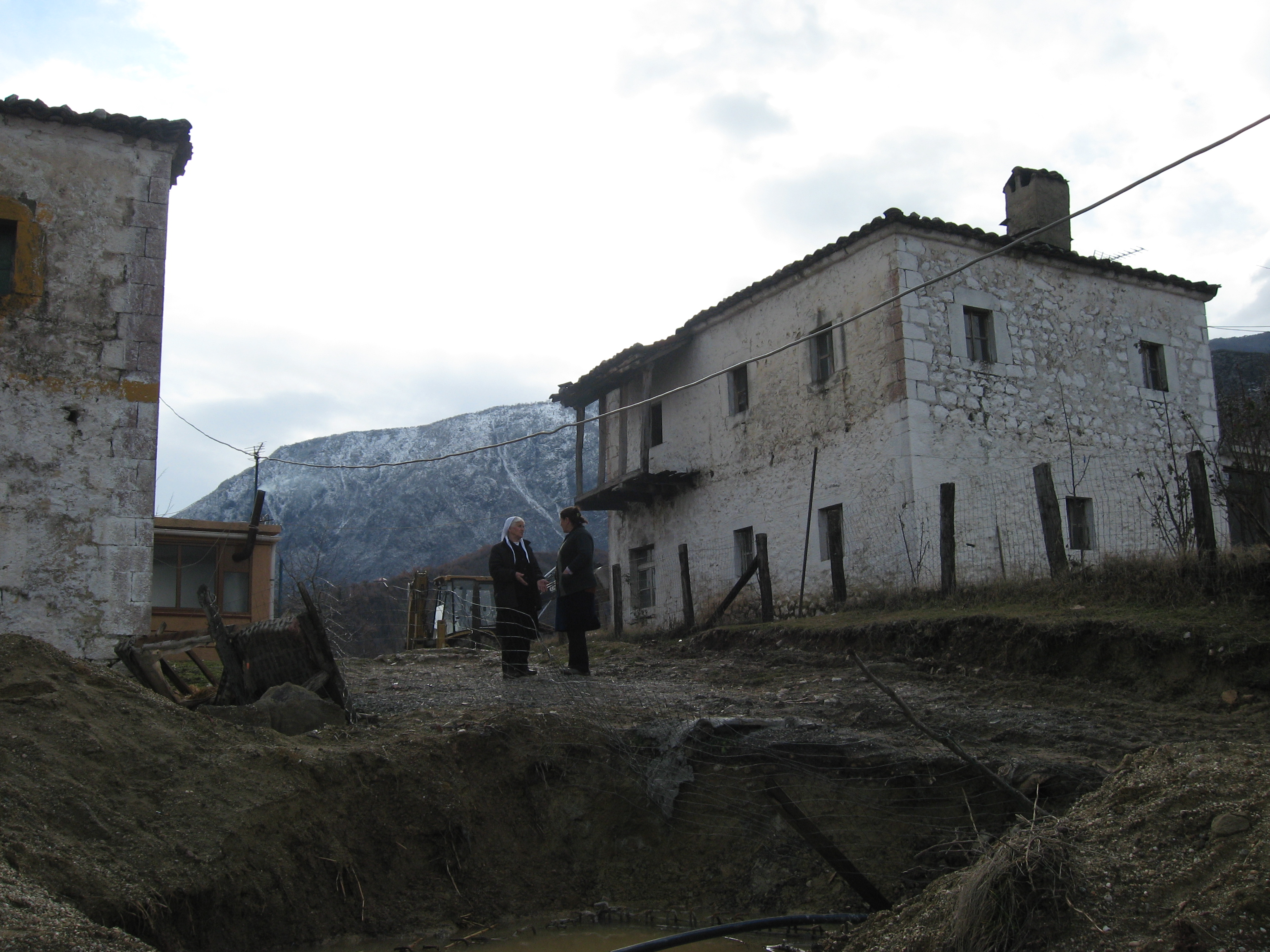
- The village of Mishter in Gurrë

- Location within Albania
- Coordinates: 41°32′N 20°1′E
- Country: Albania
- County: Dibër
- Municipality: Klos

Population (2011)
  - Administrative unit: 3,369
- Time zone: UTC+1 (CET)
  - Summer (DST): UTC+2 (CEST)

Gurrë is a former commune in the Dibër County, northern Albania. At the 2015 local government reform it became a subdivision of the municipality Klos. The population at the 2011 census was 3,369.

== Demographic history ==
Gurrë (Gur) is recorded in the Ottoman defter of 1467 as village in the timar of Barak in the vilayet of Mati. The settlement had a total of nine households represented by the following household heads: Kolë Kibaj, Dom Pali, Gjon Guribardi, Dom Andrija, Mihal Girdepaj, Gjergj Mizijo, Todor Bila, Buzi Bardi, and Martin Bili (Beli).
