= Dardhas =

- Administrative unit
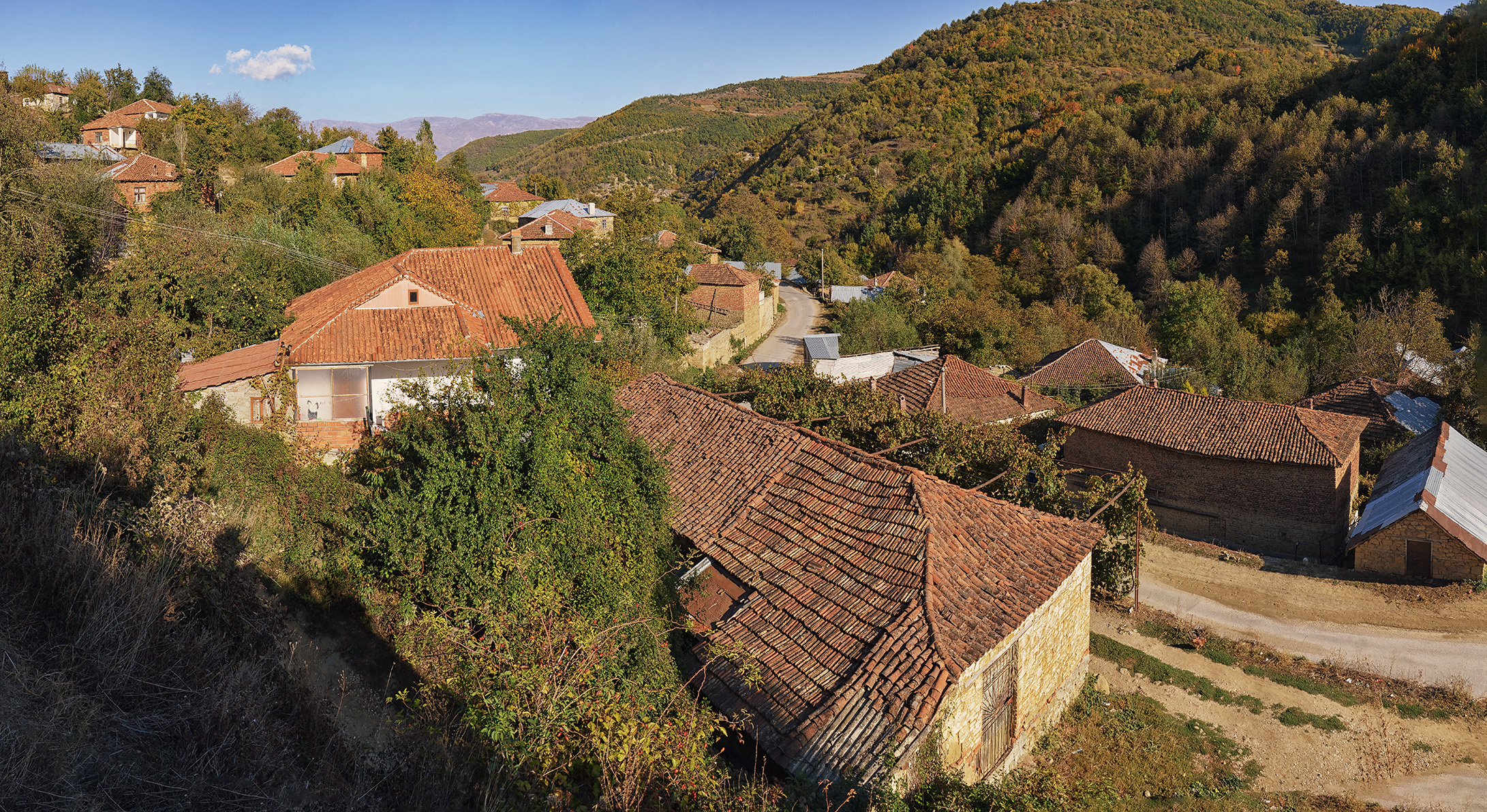
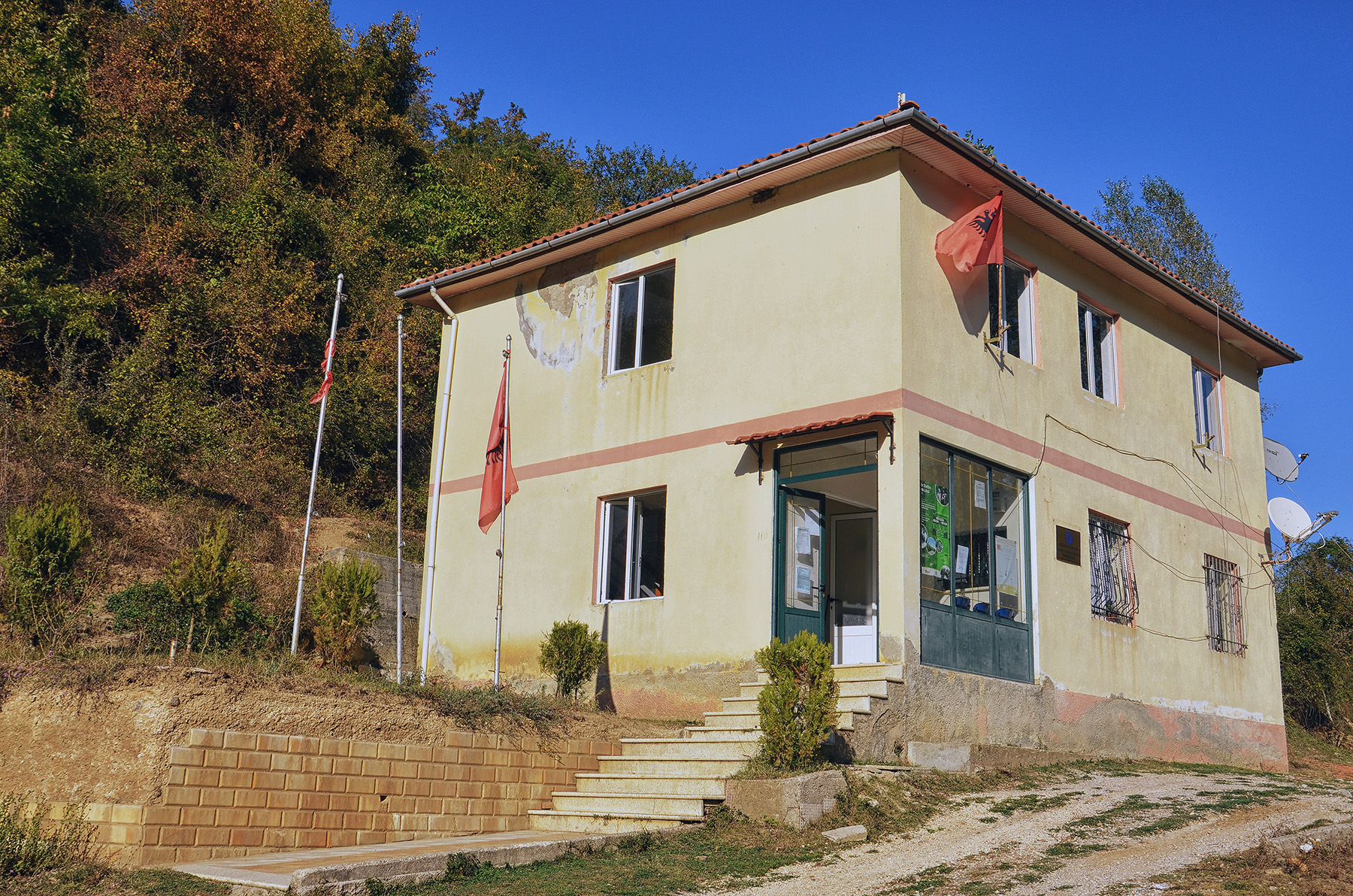
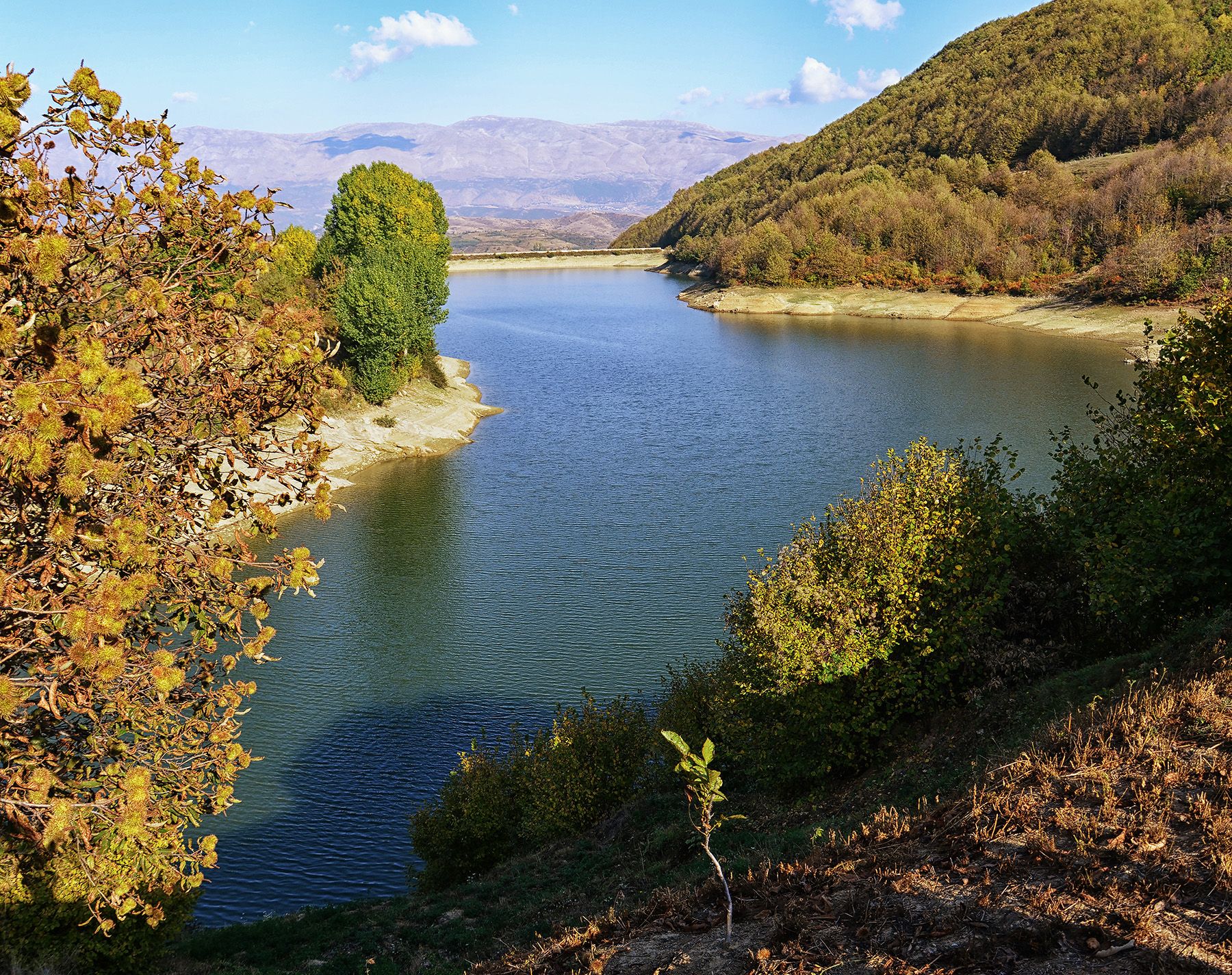
- Top to bottom, left to right: The centre of Dardhas, The municipality hall of Dardhas, The artificial lake of Dardhas

- Location within Albania
- Coordinates: 40°51′N 20°40′E
- Country: Albania
- County: Korçë
- Municipality: Pogradec

Population (2011)
  - Administrative unit: 2,182
- Time zone: UTC+1 (CET)
  - Summer (DST): UTC+2 (CEST)
- Postal Code: 7309
- Area Code: (0)869

Dardhas is an administrative unit in the municipality of Pogradec, Korçë County, Albania. The village of Dardhas is the seat of the eponymous unit and consist of the adjacent villages of Derdushë, Grunjas, Lekas, Niçë, Osnat, Prenisht, Stërkanj and Stropckë. The etymological origin of the village name comes from the Albanian word for pear “Dardhë”, this is a common place name in Albanian inhabited lands.
