= Vig-Mnelë =

- Administrative unit
- Location within Albania
- Coordinates: 41°56′N 19°44′E
- Country: Albania
- County: Shkodër
- Municipality: Vau i Dejës

Population (2011)
  - Administrative unit: 1,509
- Time zone: UTC+1 (CET)
  - Summer (DST): UTC+2 (CEST)

Vig-Mnelë is a former municipality in the Shkodër County, northwestern Albania. At the 2015 local government reform it became a subdivision of the municipality Vau i Dejës. The population at the 2011 census was 1,509.
