= Path of Freedom Party =

Political party in Albania

The Path of Freedom Party (Albanian: Partia Rruga e Lirise) is a political party in Albania, led by Shukrane Muda.
