= Tirana 5 =

Administrative unit in Tirana

Njesinë no.5

Tirana 5 (Albanian: Njësinë No. 5 ne Tiranë) is one of the 24 administrative units in Tirana. There are Petro Nini Luarasi and Besnik Sykja high schools. In this unit live 54,000 citizens.

== Neighborhoods ==
- Blloku
- Selitë
- Tirana e Re
