= Albanian Republican United Party =

Political party in Albania

- Leader: Zane Llazi
- Merged into: Democratic Movement for Integration

Albanian Republican Union Party (in Albanian: Partia Bashkimi Republikan Shqiptar, abbreviated PBRSH) is a political party in Albania. It is led by Zane Llazi.

PBRSH is part of the coalition Democratic Movement for Integration.

== See also ==
- Republican Party of Albania / Partia Republikane e Shqipërisë
