= Xhamlliku =

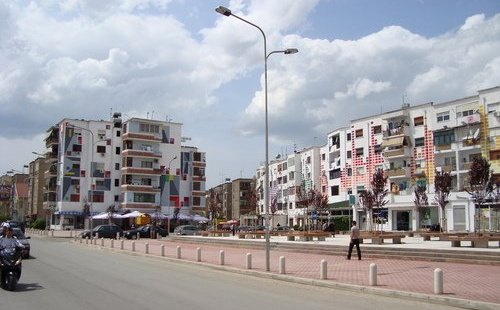
Xhamlliku in middle of the day in summer

Xhamlliku, Xhamllëku or Xhomlliku is a neighborhood in Tirana, the capital of Albania.

It is so called because of a bar situated there in Communist times that had a glass (Albanian: xham) façade. This is one of the most populated and famous neighborhoods of Tirana.
