= Bashkim Sukaj =

Swiss footballer (born 1992)

Personal information
- Date of birth: 20 March 1992 (age 34)
- Place of birth: Peja, SFR Yugoslavia (now Kosovo)
- Height: 1.84 m (6 ft 0 in)
- Position: Forward

Youth career
- 2007–2009: Lausanne-Sport

Senior career*
Years	Team	Apps	(Gls)
2009–2014	Lausanne-Sport	3	(0)
2010	→ Yverdon-Sport (loan)	5	(1)
2011–2013	Team Vaud U21	43	(25)
2014	→ Le Mont	5	(0)
2014–2015	Vevey United	13	(5)
2015–2016	Bulle	28	(7)
2016–2017	Montreux-Sports	13	(4)
- * Club domestic league appearances and goals

Bashkim Sukaj (Serbian Cyrillic: Башким Сукај, Baškim Sukaj; born 20 March 1992) is a Swiss former professional footballer who played as a forward.
