= Allias =

Neighbourhood of Tirana, Albania

Coordinates: 41°20′49″N 19°50′11″E

Allias is a neighbourhood of Tirana, Albania. It is located west of the central boulevard.
