= Rrethinat =

- Administrative unit
- Location within Albania
- Coordinates: 42°7′N 19°31′E
- Country: Albania
- County: Shkodër
- Municipality: Shkodër

Population (2011)
  - Administrative unit: 21,199
- Time zone: UTC+1 (CET)
  - Summer (DST): UTC+2 (CEST)

Rrethinat is a former municipality in the Shkodër County, northwestern Albania. At the 2015 local government reform it became a subdivision of the municipality Shkodër. The population at the 2011 census was 21,199.

== Demographics ==
During the early 2010s linguists Klaus Steinke and Xhelal Ylli seeking to corroborate villages cited in past literature as being Slavic speaking carried out fieldwork in settlements of the area. Shtoj i Ri and Shtoj i Vjetër in the Shkodër area are two of a number of villages with a Slavophone population that speak a Montenegrin dialect. The village of Shtoj i Ri has a compact population of 17 Muslim Podgoriçani families, while Shtoj i Vjetër has a compact population of 30 Muslim Podgoriçani families.
