= Laprakë =

Neighbourhood of Tirana, Albania

Coordinates: 41°20′22″N 19°47′40″E

Laprakë is a neighbourhood of Tirana, Albania, located west of the main centre. It is mainly a residential district, but also contains the Tirana Military Hospital, the Albanian Mobile Communications building, the ProCredit Bank building and several other high-rise buildings, a football pitch, and a petrol station.

South of Laprakë lies the Lapraka Airfield.

A street there is named after Androniqi Zengo Antoniu, Albania's first woman professional artist.
