= Kombinat (neighborhood) =

Coordinates: 41°18′51″N 19°46′1″E

Kombinat is a southwestern suburb of Tirana, Albania, located about 6 kilometres from the main centre. It contains a number of landmarks related to Joseph Stalin including an old statue (located on Garibaldi Square) and an old textiles factory. Kombinat Stalin Textiles Factory once employed up to 2000 workers and was capable of an ultimate annual capacity of 2,0000,000 square meters of cotton cloth. It also contains an old coal factory and a bus station near the statue and square. The football club FK Kombinati is based in Kombinat as the headquarters of Coca-Cola Albania.
