= Dajt =

- Administrative unit
- Location within Albania
- Coordinates: 41°24′N 19°55′E
- Country: Albania
- County: Tirana
- Municipality: Tirana
  - Administrative unit: 116 km^{2} (45 sq mi)

Population (2023)
  - Administrative unit: 35,170
  - Administrative unit density: 303/km^{2} (785/sq mi)
- Time zone: UTC+1 (CET)
  - Summer (DST): UTC+2 (CEST)
- Postal Code: 1040
- Area Code: (0)48

Dajt is a former municipality in the Tirana County, central Albania. At the 2015 local government reform it became a subdivision of the municipality Tirana. The population as of the 2023 census is 35,170. The municipal unit took its name from the Mount Dajt.

Historical population
Year	Pop.	±%
1979	6,774	—
1989	7,536	+11.2%
2001	8,486	+12.6%
2011	20,139	+137.3%
2023	35,170	+74.6%

== Seal ==
The seal of the municipality derives from the coat of arms of the medieval Albanian noble family of Skurra.
