= Cultural heritage of Albania =

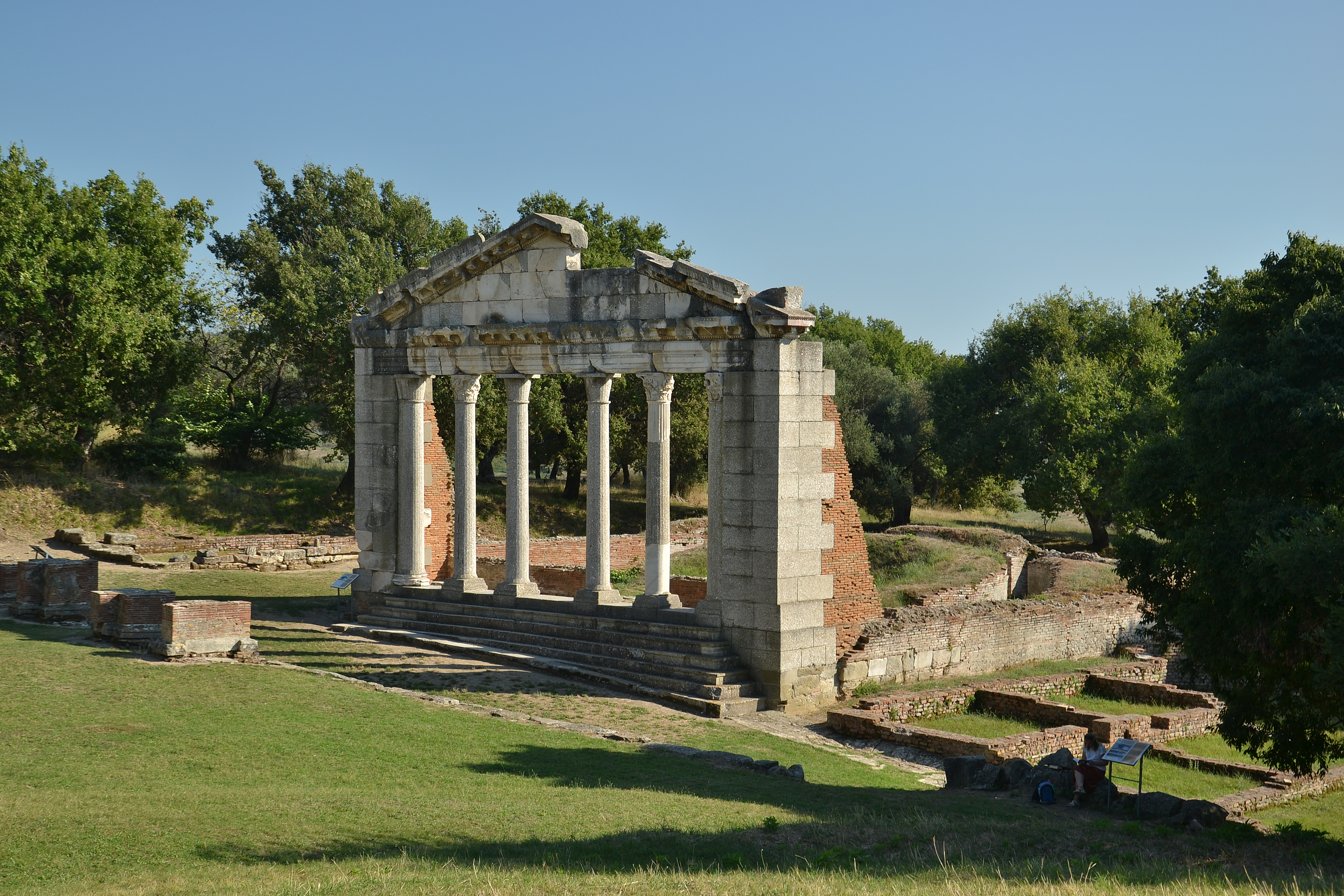
Apollonia in Illyria, (today Albania) - Monument of Agonothetes

== Ancient heritage ==
- Illyrian heritage: The origins of Albanian culture are associated with the Illyrian and Dardanian civilizations, who lived in the area roughly 3,000 years ago. The Illyrians considered by historians as the primordial ancestors of the Albanians, whose civilization widely influenced later-day Albanian culture and language.
- Ancient Greek and Roman Influences: Settlers from the ancient Greek and Roman civilizations arrived in present-day Albania, respectively in the 7th and 2nd Centuries BCE. Their entrenchment in the local Albania cultural and social milieu encouraged the adoption of distinctive architectural styles, evident in the Roman amphitheaters scattered around the country and the city of Apollonia. These influences continue to be visible in the country's archaeological sites.

== Intangible heritage ==
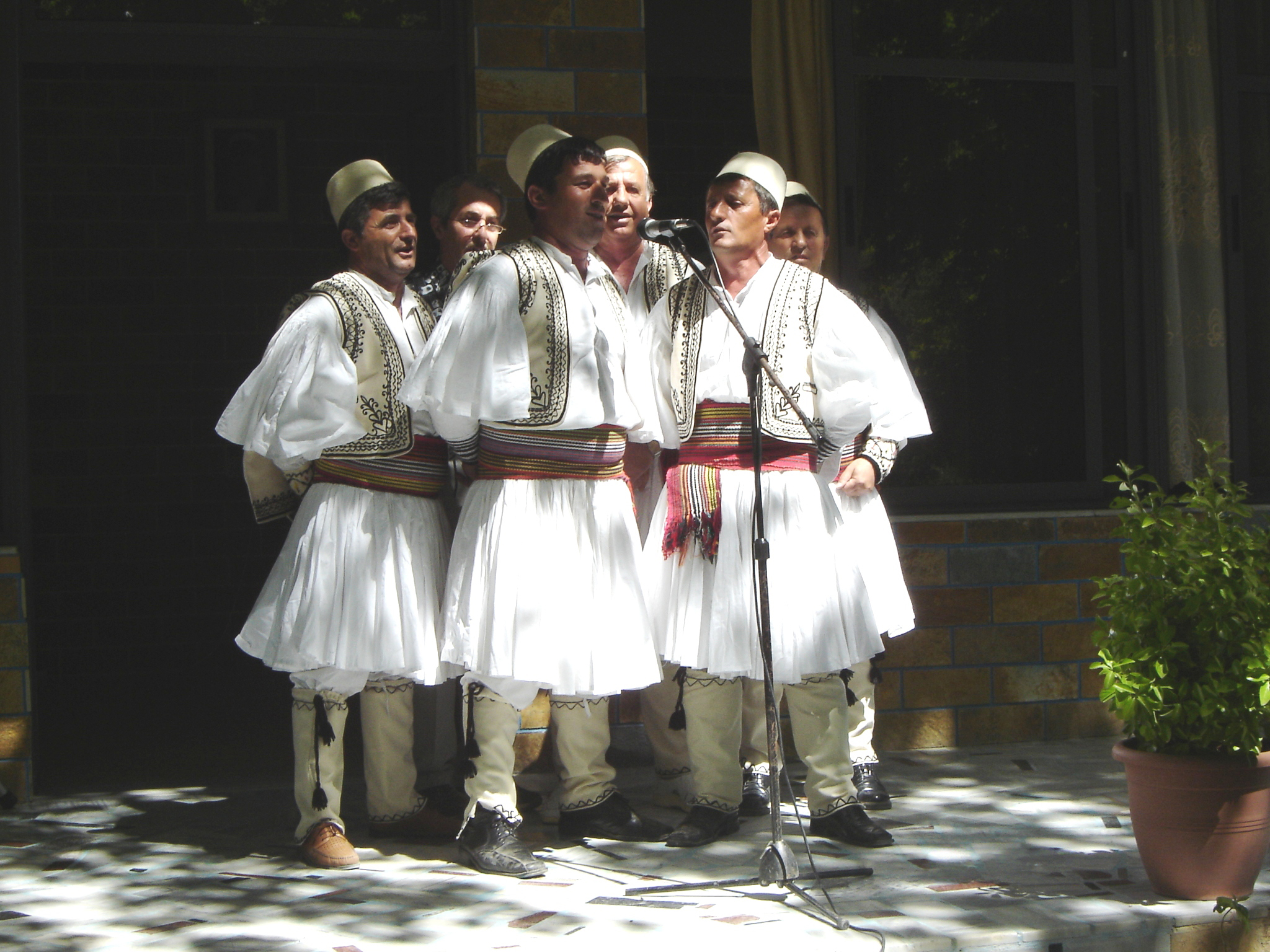
A traditional male folk group from Skrapar singing an iso-polyphonic song

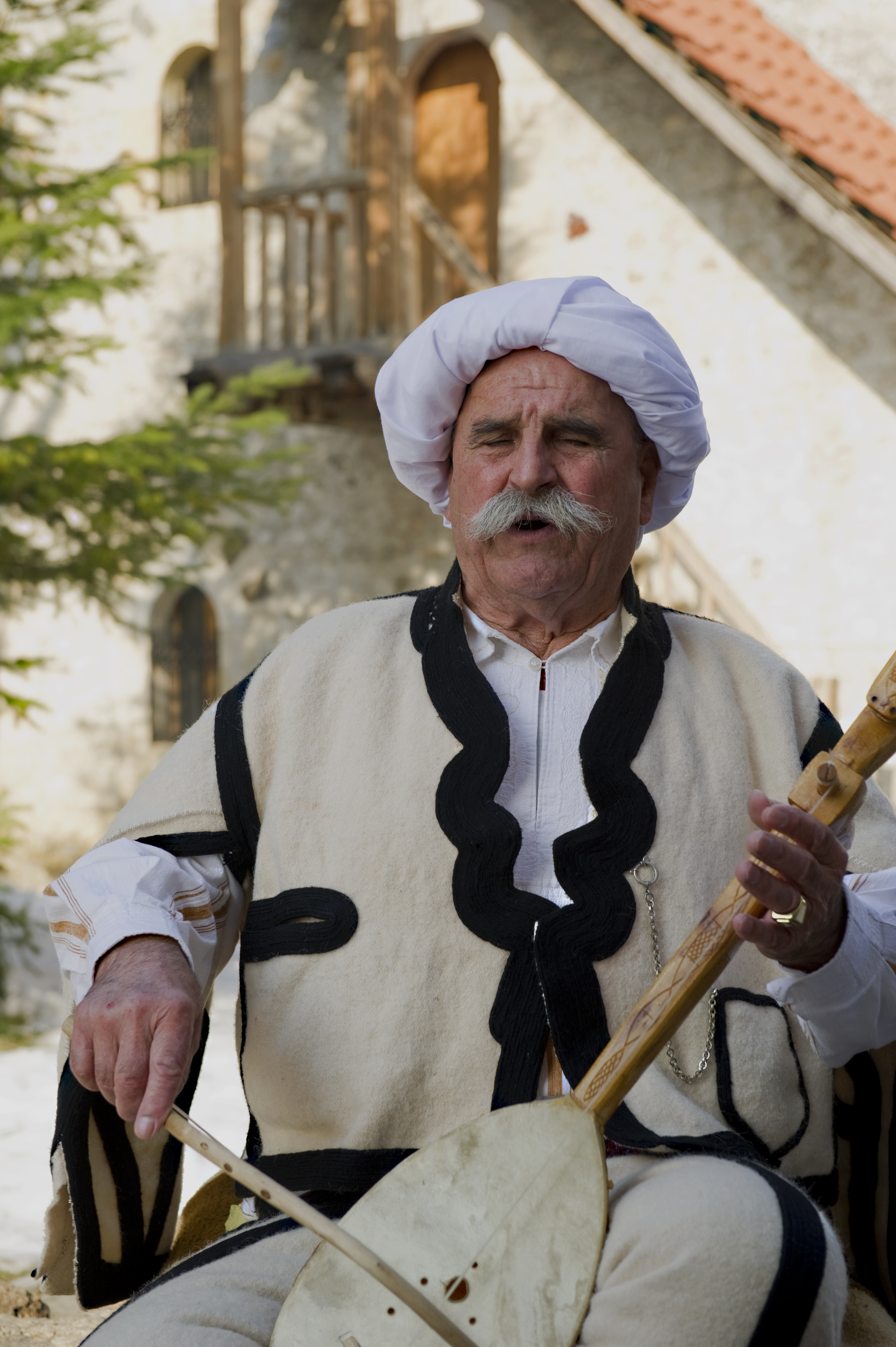
The Lahutarian in national dress

- Iso-Polyphonic Folk Music: This UNESCO-recognized tradition is a documented as a unique vocal music style characterized by complex harmonies and layered melodies. Often sung at festivals and celebrations, it is widely considered a central vehicle for expressing Albanian cultural identity. The vocal tradition differs by geography, with the Labëri style from southern Albania, the Toskëri style from central Albania, and the Ghegs from northern Albania.
- Epic Ballads: Albanian folklore includes a large number of epic poems (Kângë Kreshnikësh) sung by men called "lahuta players," accompanying themselves on a one-stringed instrument called a lahuta. These ballads narrate tales of bravery, historical events, and legendary heroes, with the intent of preserving Albanian traditions. The Albania epic singing tradition is considered the last in Europe to remain intact, with comparable epics such as Germany's Nibelungen Epic no longer sustained over generations.
- Traditional Costumes: While Western clothing styles are most popular in Albania's urban centers, rural areas maintain commonplace wearing of traditional Albania dress. Embroidery featuring a wide variety of colors, headwear with unique styles like the plis (folded hat) in southern Albania, and regional variations in clothing styles all contribute to a unique style of Albanian attire. The Xhubleta skirt worn by Albanian women was included in the List of Intangible Cultural Heritage in Need of Urgent Safeguarding by UNESCO in 2022.

== Museums and monuments ==
Albania features numerous museums and monuments that reflect the country's thousands-year-long and varied history, cultural and artistic traditions, as well as archaeological finds. The country's main museums and monuments address Albanian archaeology, history, ethnography and art. In November 2019, following a 6.4-Richter scale earthquake in Albania, the European Union launched the EU4Culture initiative to restore 23 "major cultural heritage sites" damaged by the natural disaster. The project was budgeted at €40 million and implemented by the United Nations Office for Project Services (UNOPS), in coordination with the Albanian Ministry of Economy, Culture and Innovation.

Museums

- National History Museum (Albania), Tirana: Located in central Tirana, Albania's largest museum showcases artifacts from prehistoric times to the communist era (1946-1992). Exhibits considered as museum highlights include a replica of the sword of Skanderbeg, a 15th-century military leader memorialized as Albania's national hero. The museum was closed in March 2024 to undergo renovation work expected to last four years, with the reopening date scheduled for March 2028.The museum is designated by the government as a Category II Cultural Monument.
- National Museum of Medieval Art, Korçë: This measure features a collection of more than 7,000 works Albanian art from the Middle Ages, featuring icons, frescoes, and religious artifacts painted in a Byzantine style.
- Marubi National Museum of Photography, Shkodër: vThe first museum of photography in Albania, featuring more than 50,000 images from photographers considered pioneers in their field in Albanian history, such as Pjetër Marubi.
- Onufri Iconographic Museum, Berat: Located inside the Berat Castle, the museum focuses on Albanian iconographic art of the 16th century painter and archbishop Onufri. It houses about 200 objects taken from various churches and monasteries within the Berat area, dating between the 14th and 20 centuries.

Monuments

- Krujë Castle (Fortress of Krujë): A fortress dating to the 5th or 6th century, which later served as a historical center of Albanian resistance against to Ottoman Empire encroachment in the 15th century, led by the military commander Skanderbeg. The fortress is situated on a hill overlooking the city of Krujë, 30 km north of Tirana.
- Ardenica Monastery: This monastery complex dates back to the 13th century and was built on the ruins of a temple. It is known for frescoes created by leading Albanian artists including the 18th century painters Kostandin Zografi and Athanas Zografi, and Kostandin Shpataraku. The complex is considered a standard-bearer of Byzantine architecture, having been constructed under the rule of the Byzantine Despotate of Epirus.
- Et'hem Bey Mosque, Tirana: Considered emblematic of Ottoman religious architecture, this mosque is noted for frescoes and wall decorations, a rarity in Islamic houses of worship, that depict natural landscapes and bridges. Construction on the building began in the early 18th century under the Ottoman-Albanian religious leader Molla Bey, and completed by his son Et'hem bey Mollaj.
- Apollonia Archaeological Park: The ruins of this ancient Greek colony, founded in the 6th century BCE, are situated in southwestern Albania, about 20 km west of Fier. It was once a major port city in the region and a key Mediterranean economic center, but lost its coastline after an earthquake in 234 CE. Archeological evidence has evidenced temples dedicated to Apollo and Artemis, a theater, public buildings, and the foundations of private houses with preserved mosaic pavements.

== UNESCO World heritage sites ==
Despite being one of Europe's smallest countries, Albania is home to three sites on the UNESCO World Heritage Site List:

- Butrint (Latin: Buthrōtum), in southern Albania and about 20 km west of Sarande, was an ancient Greek city, then a Roman one and the seat of a late Roman bishopric. After a period of abandonment it was occupied by the Byzantines in the 9th century the Angevins and the Venetians in the 14th century. It was later fortified to address repeated attacks by the rulers of Epirus and then the Ottomans. Prominent archeological sites include a Greek theater, a late-antique baptistery and a ninth-century basilica that itself was rebuilt in the 9th century.
- Berat: Nicknamed "City of a Thousand Windows," refers to the numerous windows that line the facades of Ottoman houses which are built into the hilly landscape. The city, designated a UNESCO World Heritage Site in 2008, comprises a unique style of architecture with influences from several civilizations that took root in Albania over millennia. Like many cities in Albania, Berat features an old fortified city, which is among the best preserved Ottoman-era towns in the country. This section of the city contains numerous churches and mosques, some of which are painted with murals and frescoes. Berat has been considered one of the main cultural and spiritual centers of Albania, both for Islam and Orthodox Christianity.
- Gjirokastër: Gjirokastër's historic center was inscribed as a UNESCO World Heritage Site in 2005. It is recognized for being a prime example of an Ottoman town, due to its characteristically Balkan homes with turrets (kullë). These houses date from between the 17th and 19th centuries.

== Religious harmony and heritage ==
- Iljaz Bey Mirahor Mosque: Built in 1496 by Ottoman Albanian leader Iljaz Bey, the mosque is considered one of Albania's leading historical and architectural monuments, especially in how it represents early Ottoman architecture in the southeastern part of the country. The mosque's uniqueness is highlighted by a minaret denoted for its elegance and interior decorations that address various Islamic motifs.
- John the Baptist’s Monastery, Voskopoja: A church and monastery compound dating from the 17th century and deemed to reflect on the cultural legacy and former economic prosperity of Voskopoja. The church was constructed in the Byzantine style and is highlighted for its preserved mural paintings by the monk Andon of Shipcka.
- Saint Marena Monastery: Perched on a plateau overlooking the city of Pogradec and Lake Ohrid, the church is an 18th-century basilica dedicated to the 5th century Byzantine monk Marina. The complex features a two-story entrance hall, a nave, and an open walkway, while the interior is replete with frescoes depicting individual saints, themes of the Apocalypse, and the Feast of Christ, among others.
- Church of Saint Koll (Nicholas) Monastery, Mesopotam: A church whose origins date to the 11th century, itself built on an early Eastern Orthodox monastic complex. The monastery complex features unique architecture that includes brick decorations, and sculptures on the facade walls. According to researchers, it was believed to have been damaged in a 1510 earthquake.
- King Mosque, Berat: One of the main Muslim places of worship in Berat to this day, the mosque was constructed by the order of Ottoman Sultan Bayezid II in the late 15th century, and is one of the country's earliest Islamic structures. It contains a minaret, a prayer hall, and a balcony. The mosque is distinguished from standard Ottoman mosques and other contemporary buildings with its flat wooden roof.
- Muradije Mosque, Vlore: This mosque in Albania's third-largest city was built in 1537 by noted Ottoman architect Mimar Sinan, during the reign of Sultan Suleiman I (Suleiman the Magnificent). The mosque is distinguished for its stone and brick facade.

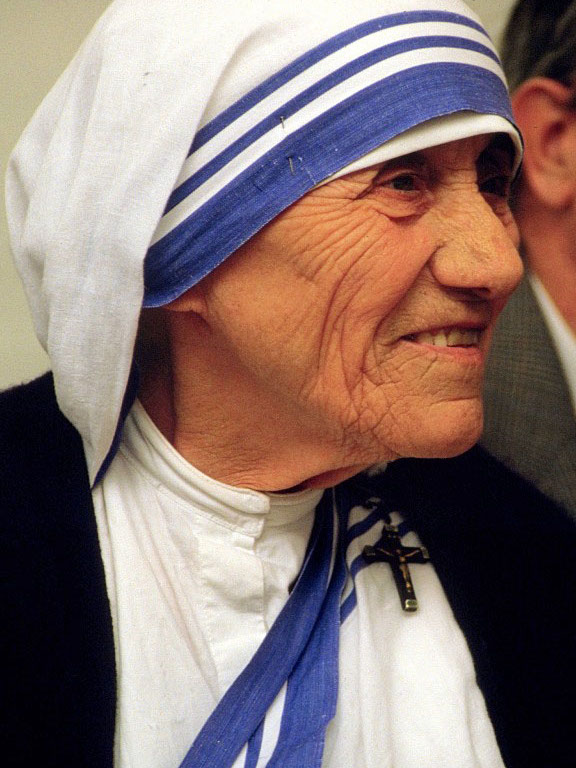
Mother Teresa was an Albanian Roman Catholic nun and missionary.

== See also ==
- Culture of Albania
- Palace of Culture of Tirana
- List of World Heritage Sites in Albania
- National Institute of Cultural Heritage (Albania)
- List of Intangible Cultural Heritage elements in Albania
