= Flag of Tirana =

City of Tirana
- Tirana flag with the coat of arms
- Proportion: 2:3
- Adopted: November 14, 2000; 26 years ago

The Flag of Tirana is a blue field with a shield in the center with a clock tower and lion beneath a castle.

The clock tower represents the Tirana Clock Tower that was built in 1822 by Et'hem bey Mollaj and stands as a symbol of the city's history. The lion represents the coat of arms of the Skuraj family, a prominent medieval Albanian feudal dynasty that ruled over central Albania. The castle above the shield represents the Fortress of Justinian, also known as Tirana Castle, dating back to pre-1300.

== Gallery ==
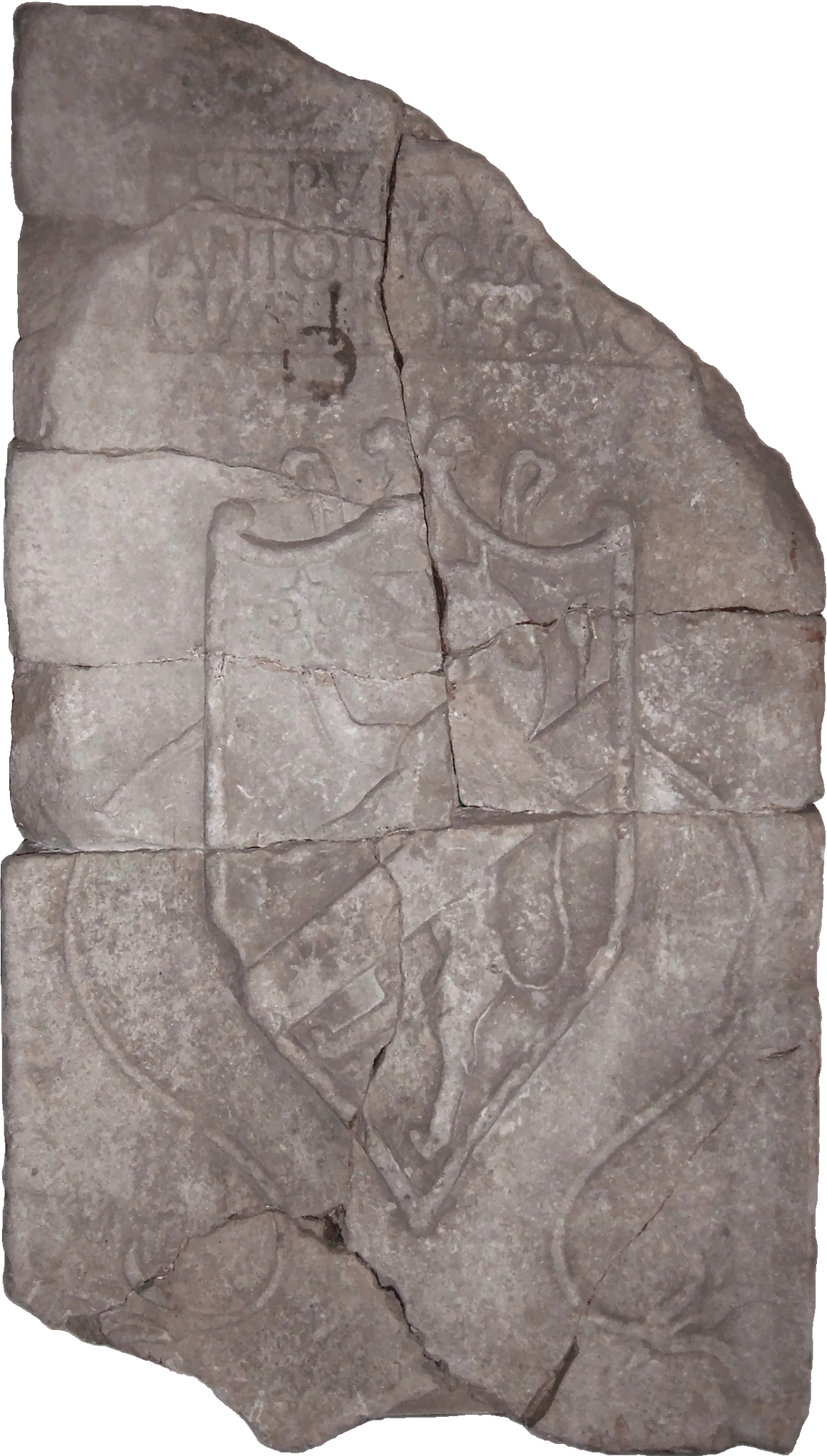
Coat of arms of the Skuraj family

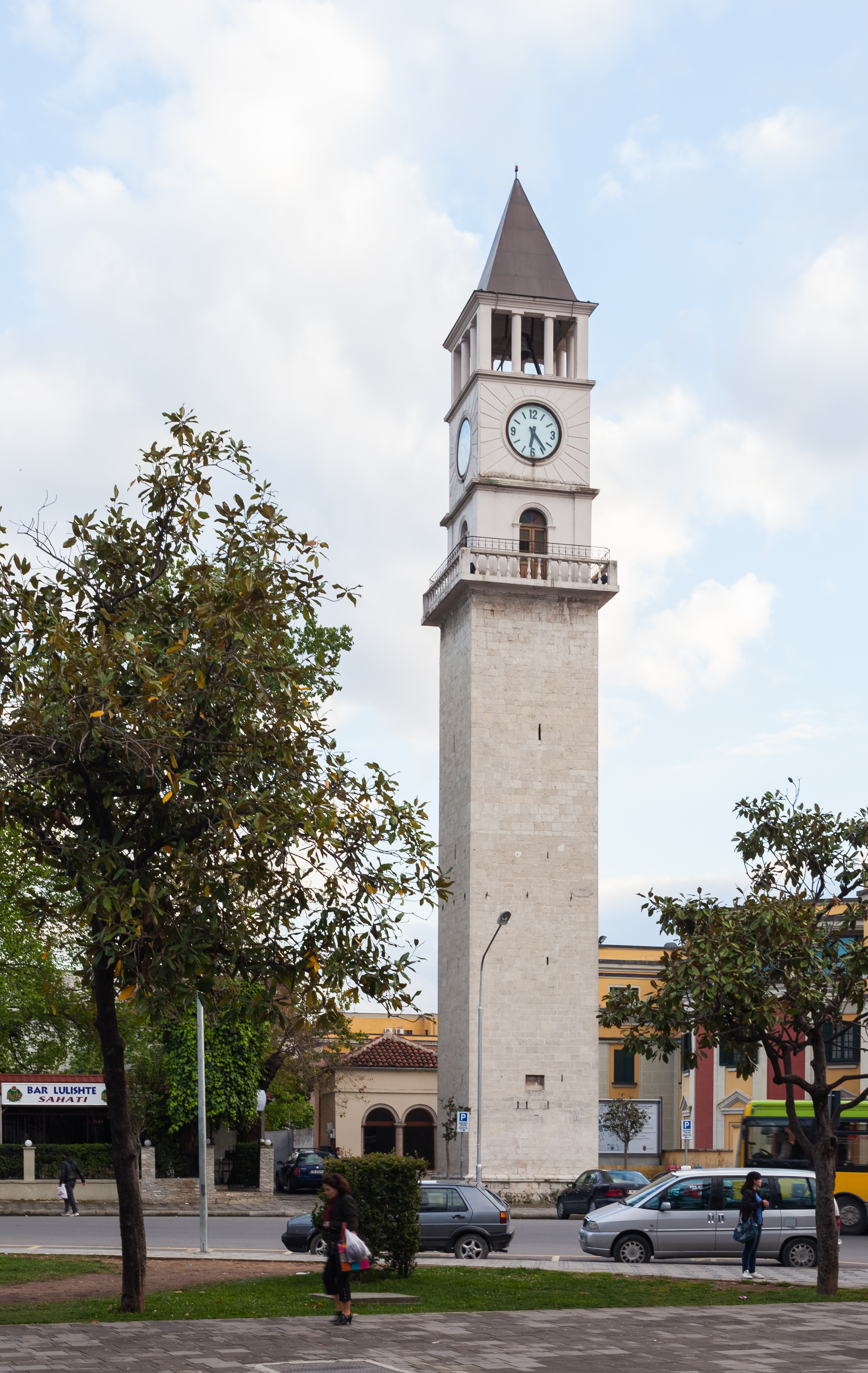
The Tirana Clock Tower

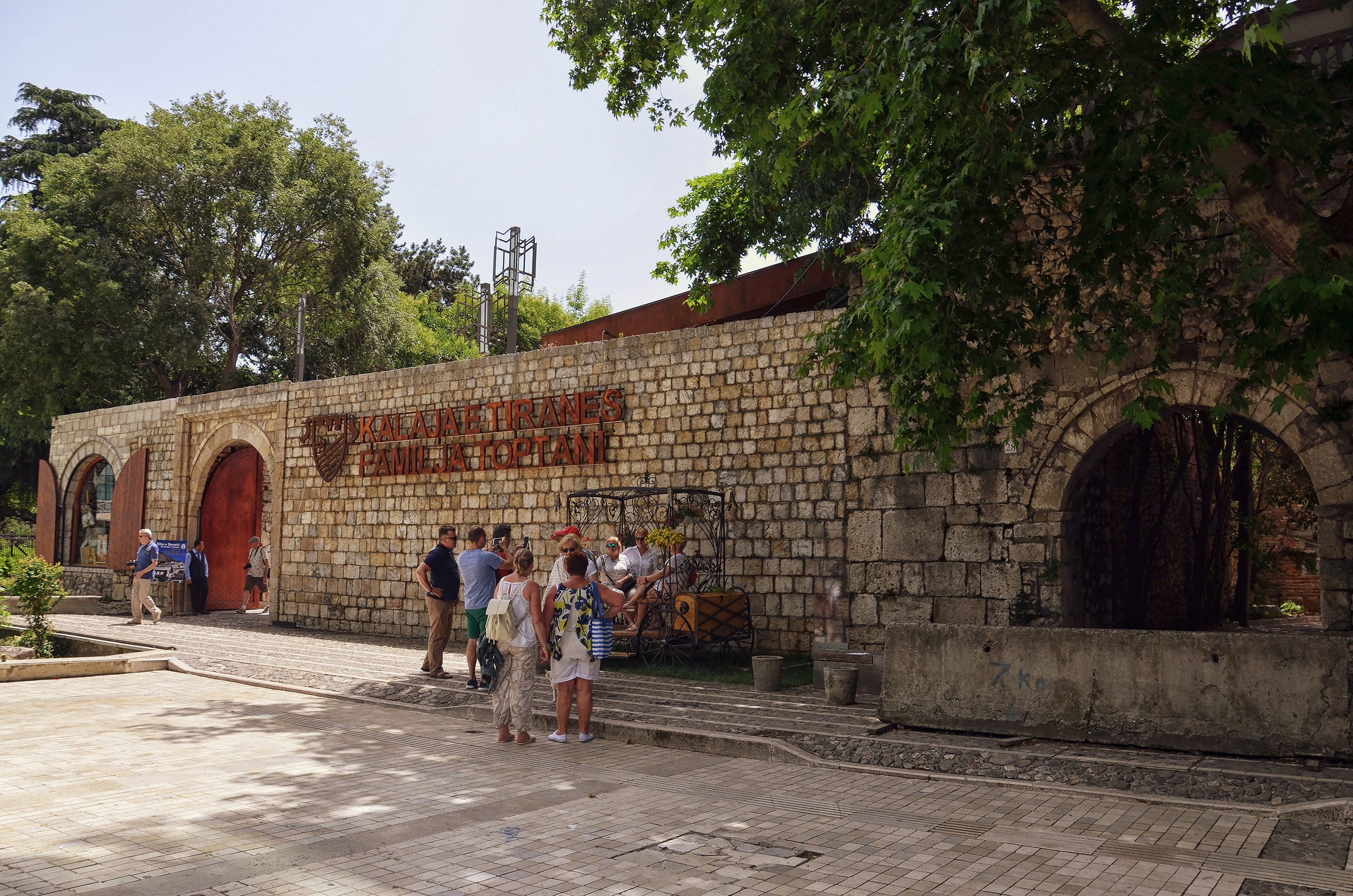
The Castle of Tirana

== See also ==
- Coat of arms of Tirana
