= Coat of arms of Tirana =

- Adopted: 2000
- Use: Tirana Municipality

The Tirana coat of arms, also known as the Shield of Tirana, is the coat of arms of Tirana, features a shield with a clock tower and lion beneath a castle. The coat of arms was approved by the city council on November 14, 2000. Based on the principles of blazonry, the coat of arms consists of a shield divided vertically into red and blue halves (Per pale Gules and Azure). The red half, on the left side of the coat of arms from the perspective of the viewer (dexter), features a silver (Argent) clock tower. The blue half, situated on the right side (sinister), features a silver lion rampant, with a golden (Or) fleur-de-lis slightly above the lion's right paw. An illustration of Tirana Castle is situated above the shield.

== History and symbolism ==
=== Skuraj Coat of arms ===
The Skuraj family, a prominent medieval Albanian feudal dynasty, held sway over the region of Benda in central Albania in the 13th century. Some family members attained high military and administrative ranks within the Byzantine state apparatus, specifically in the empire's military-civilian province or Theme of Dyrrhachium. The family also developed strategic relationships with both the local Albanian nobility and major regional powers such as the Angevin Kingdom of Albania, Ottoman Empire, and Catholic Church.

Early attestations of the Skuraj confirm their emergence as a prominent family in the 13th century, with familial tombs and inscriptions showcasing their high rank and status. Notable figures included Progonos Sgouros (Progon Skura), who distinguished for founding or restoring churches in the region and repelling foreign invasions, such as the 1296 campaign by the Kingdom of Serbia. The family's maintained a delicate web of relations with the Angevin dynasty and subsequent vassalage under Philip I of Taranto.

Branches of the Skuraj family later settled int northern Albania, especially around Lezhë. Following the Ottoman conquest of the area in the late 15th century, some branches integrated into the Ottoman state, contributing to conquests and holding high positions such as beylerbey of Anatolia.

The heraldic emblem of the family was uncovered in Kodër Marlekaj. It features a lion in an upright stance, grasping a lily in the upper right corner. Additionally, there are two dangling cords adorned with lilies at their ends, along with a fragmentary Latin inscription.

=== Tirana Clock Tower ===
The Clock Tower of Tirana, built in 1822 by Et'hem bey Mollaj, is regarded as a central symbol of the Albanian capital's history. Rising to 35 meters, it once held the distinction of being the tallest building in Tirana. With 90 spiral steps leading to its top, the tower houses a bell from Venice and a clock mechanism installed by watchmaker Ismail Tufina. While the tower was damaged during both World War I and II, the tower underwent renovations in the past century. These include the installation of a new clock mechanism in 1928, funded by some of the city's affluent families and the Municipality of Tirana. The tower was recognized by the Albanian government with the status of a first-category cultural monument in 1948. Today, the tower remains one of Tirana's best-known historical landmarks.

=== Tirana Castle ===
The Fortress of Justinian, also known as Tirana Castle, stands as a historic landmark in Tirana, Albania. Its origins trace back to pre-1300, harking back to the Byzantine era. Positioned at the vital juncture of east-west and north-south routes, it once served as the nucleus of Tirana. The Castle of Tirana was granted the status of a first-category cultural monument in 1973, while the newly unearthed walls were similarly honored in 2008. Only parts of the fortress survive today, namely a 6-meter-high Ottoman-era wall, adorned with climbing vines. As of October 2025, efforts were ongoing to restore the fortress for tourism purposes with three prominent towers identified within its precinct.

== Gallery ==
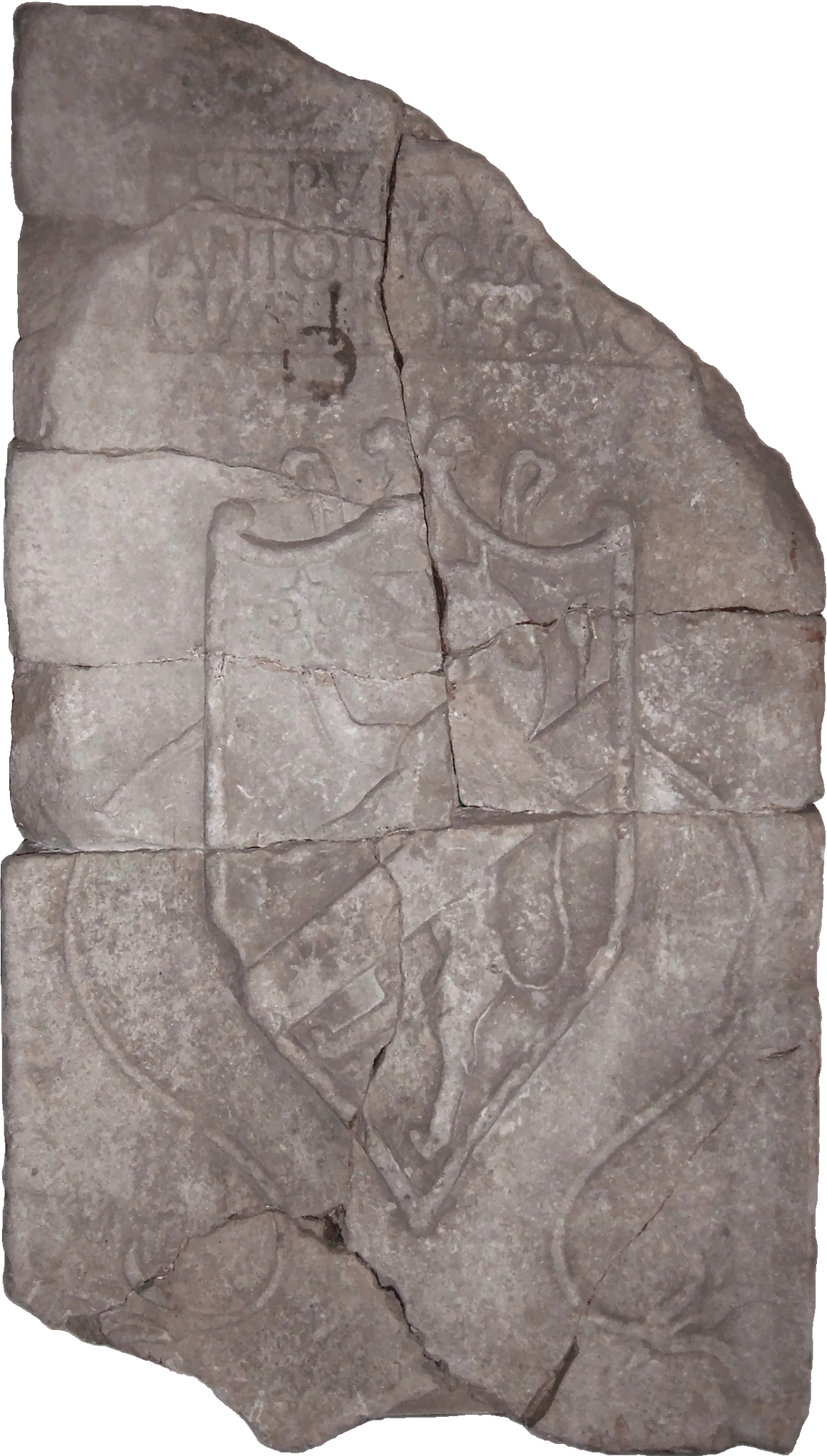
Coat of arms of the Skuraj family

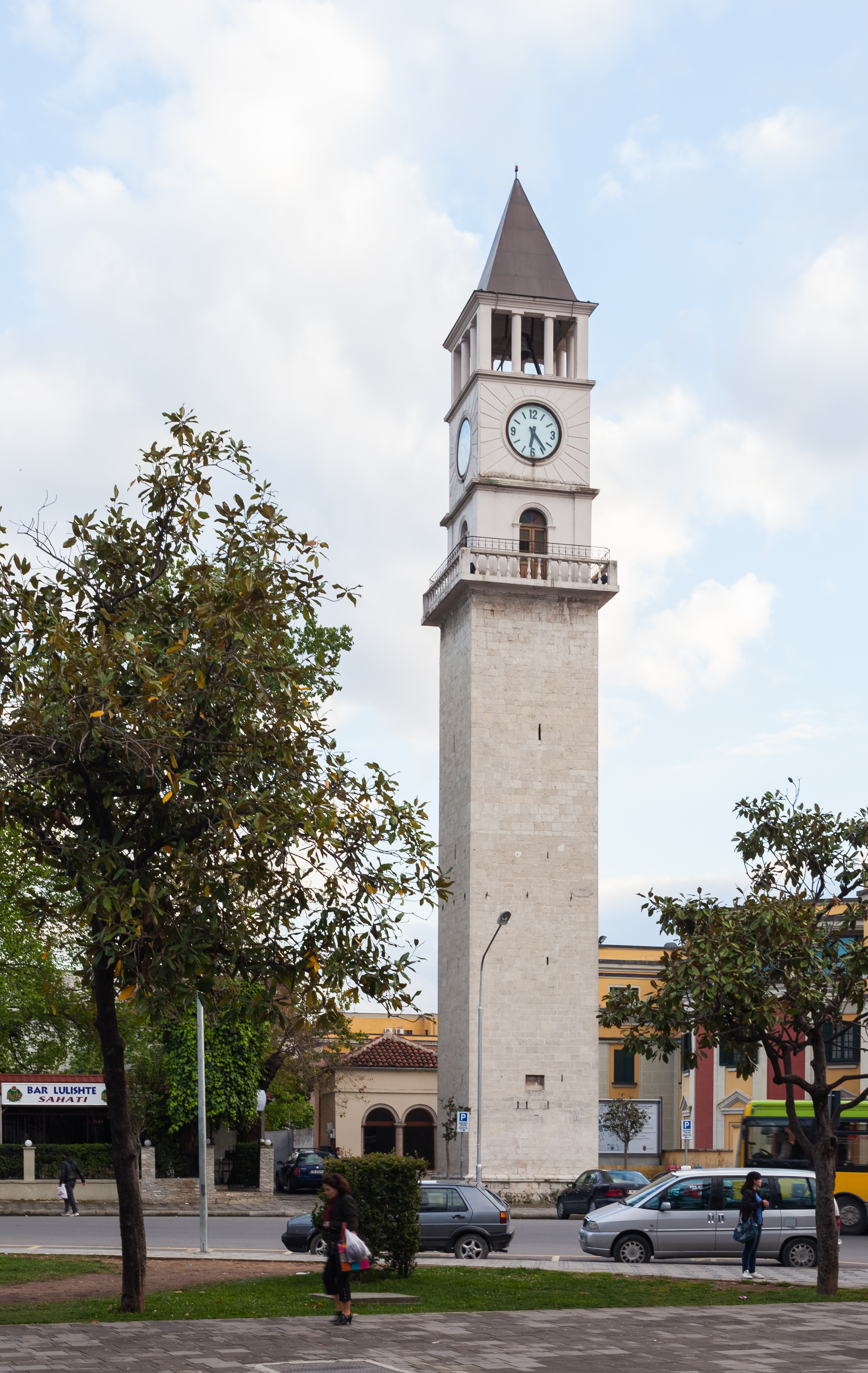
The Tirana Clock Tower

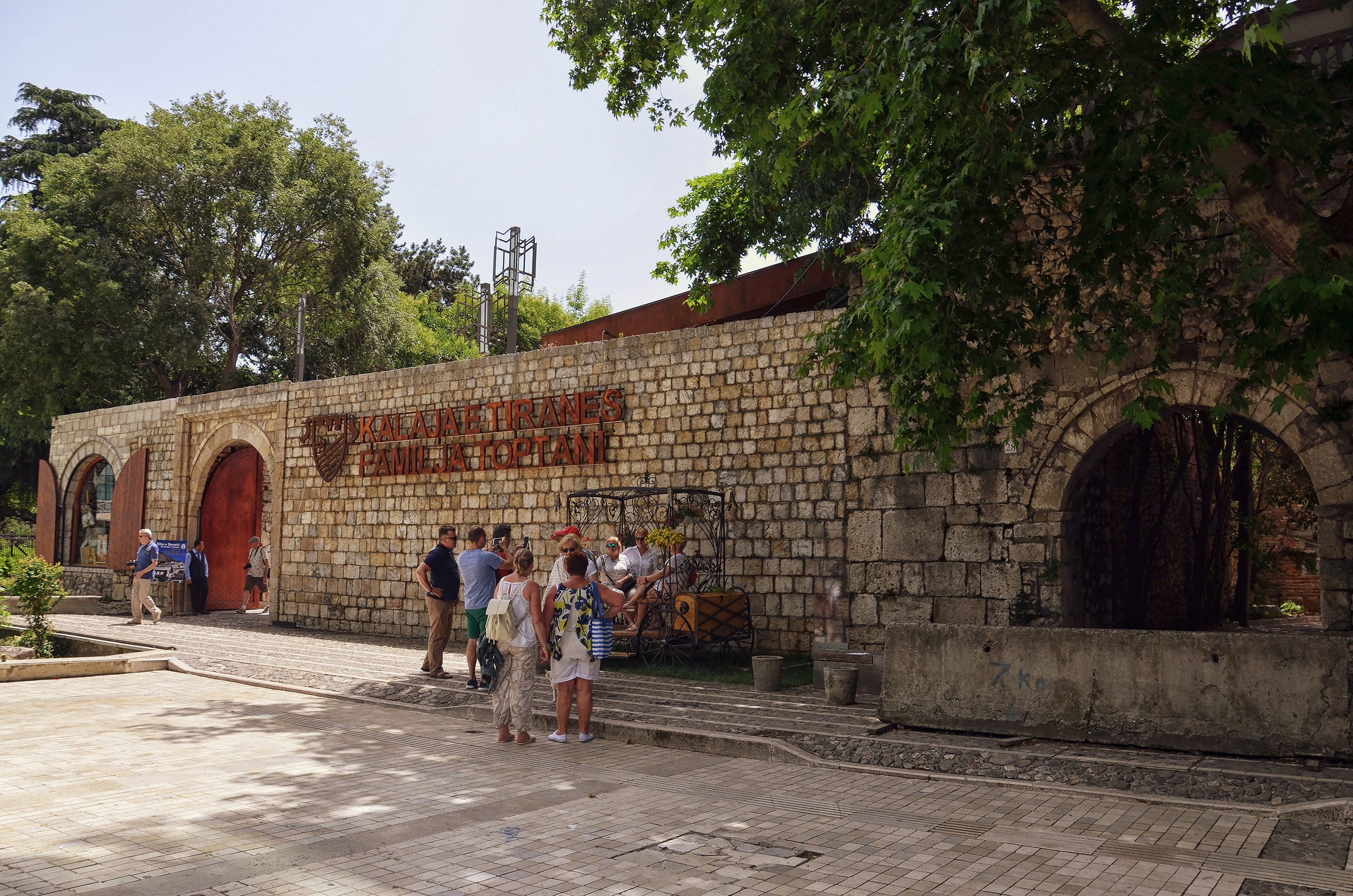
The Castle of Tirana

== See also ==
- Flag of Tirana
