= List of symbols of the subdivisions of Albania =

This is a list of the emblemns and flags of the subdivisions of Albania, including the counties (first-level subdivisions), and the municipalities (second-level subdivisions).

== Counties ==
=== Emblems ===
Berat County

Dibër County

Durrës County

Elbasan County

Fier County

Gjirokastër County

Korçë County

Kukës County

Lezhë County

Shkodër County

Tirana County

Vlorë County

=== Flags ===
Berat County

Durrës County

Elbasan County

Korçë County

Kukës County

Tirana County

Vlorë County

== Municipalities ==
=== Emblems ===
Belsh

Berat

Bulqizë

Cërrik

Delvinë

Devoll

Dibër

Dimal

Divjakë

Dropull

Durrës

Elbasan

Fier

Finiq

Fushë-Arrëz

Gjirokastër

Gramsh

Has

Himara

Kamëz

Kavajë

Këlcyrë

Klos

Kolonjë

Konispol

Korçë

Krujë

Kuçovë

Kukës

Kurbin

Lezhë

Libohovë

Librazhd

Lushnjë

Malësi e Madhe

Maliq

Mallakastër

Mat

Memaliaj

Mirditë

Patos

Peqin

Përmet

Pogradec

Poliçan

Prrenjas

Pukë

Pustec

Roskovec

Rrogozhinë

Sarandë

Selenicë

Shijak

Shkodër

Skrapar

Tepelenë

Tirana

Tropojë

Vau i Dejës

Vlorë

Vorë

=== Flags ===
Kavajë

Shkodër

Tirana
