= Mahya lights =

Turkish lights on minarets during festivals

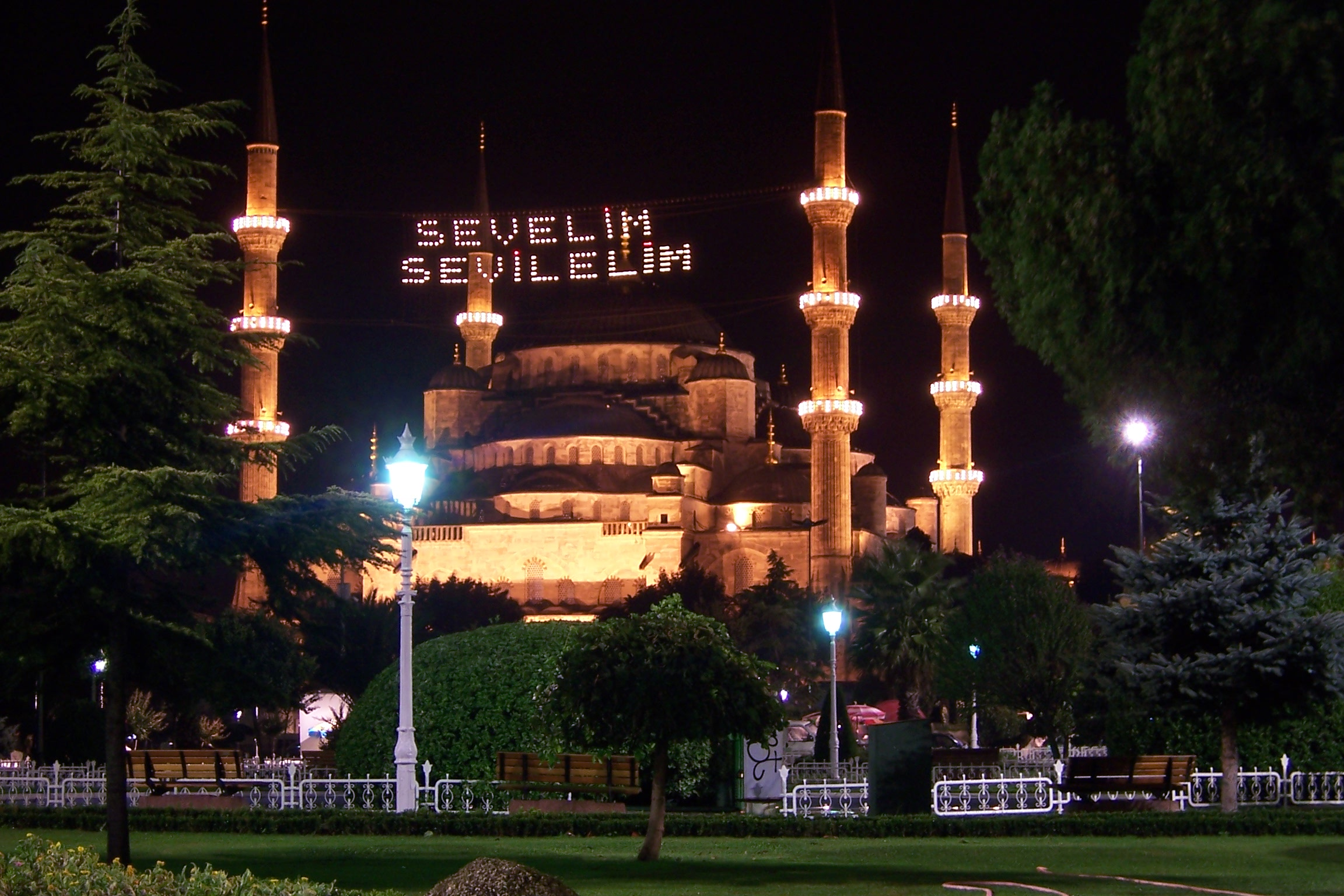
Mahya lights stretched across the minarets of the Blue Mosque in Istanbul spell out traditional Ramazan Bayramı wishes ("Let us love, Let us be loved").

Mahya lights are decorative lights which are strung up between the minarets of Turkish mosques to form illuminated words or pictures on festive occasions such as Eid al-Fitr (Ramazan Bayramı), Eid al-Adha (Kurban Bayramı), on Kandil nights, and throughout the holy month of Ramadan.

Mahya lights are a unique part of traditional Turkish festivities. They can also occasionally be seen on some mosques in the Balkans, such as in Bosnia and Herzegovina, Albania, North Macedonia, northeastern Greece, and other countries which were formerly part of the Ottoman Empire.

== Etymology ==
The word mahya is derived from Ottoman Turkish mâhiyye (ماهيه) which translates to 'monthly' or 'of the month', ultimately from Persian mâh (ماه), meaning 'month'. This is in reference to the lights being put up mainly during the month of Ramadan. In some Arabic sources the word is spelt maḥyā (محيا), a verbal noun that means 'reviving (of the night)'; the similarity is coincidental and the two words are otherwise not etymologically related.

== History ==
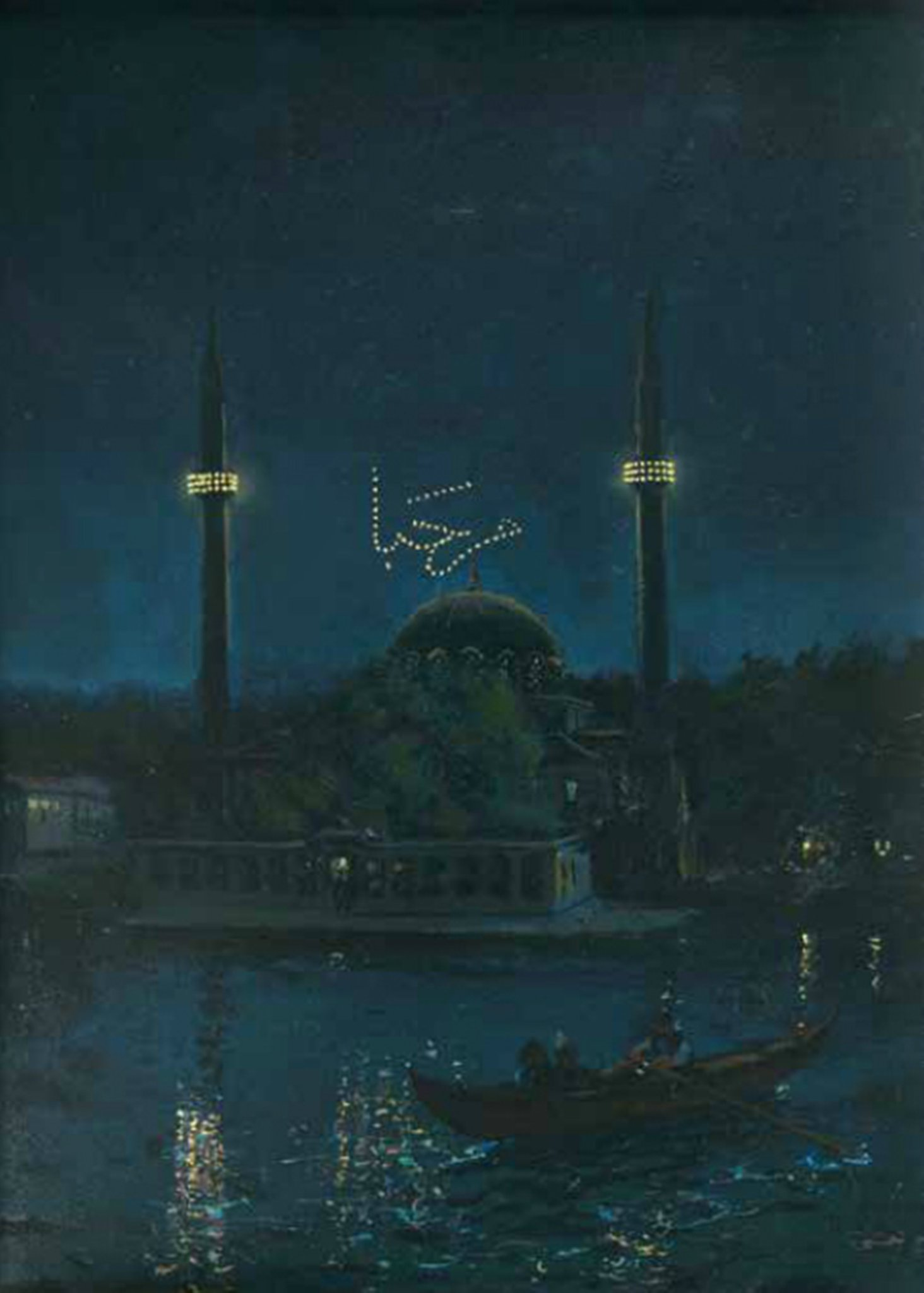
Early mahya lights, such as in this painting by artist Hüsnü Tengüz (1876–1950), spelt out words in Arabic script, before the spelling reform of the 1920s. Here the mahya lights form the word مرحبا / merhaba ('Hello').

Although the practice of lighting decorative oil lamps on holy nights dates back to the earliest centuries of Islam, the tradition of assembling lights between minarets to create words appears to have originated with the Ottomans.

It is not known exactly when mahya lights were first displayed. However, they were featured as early as 1578 in the German orientalist Salomon Schweigger's travelogue Eine newe Reyßbeschreibung auß Teutschland nach Constantinopel und Jerusalem. In February 1588, Sultan Murad III decreed that mahyas be lit on Kandil nights. Mahya lights were also recorded during the reigns of Selim II and Ahmed I.

Mahya lights have even influenced the architecture of certain mosques. In 1723 during the reign of Ahmed III, the Grand Vizier Nevşehirli Damat Ibrahim Pasha ordered that two tall minarets be raised for the Eyüp Mosque so that mahyas could be strung up from them (the mosque originally had one squat minaret). Sometimes a second minaret would be erected for this purpose by popular request, as in the case of the Mihrimah Sultan Mosque in the Üsküdar district of Istanbul. One notable mahyacı was Şehzade Mehmed Seyfeddin, the youngest son of the Sultan Abdülaziz.

Mahya lights are an iconic symbol of Turkish public celebrations and have become deeply ingrained in Turkish culture. In 1920, when festivities were toned down during the Armistice period and the Occupation of Istanbul, the Turkish novelist Yakup Kadri Karaosmanoğlu wrote nostalgically in the newspaper İkdam for the return of the mahya lights:

We are filled with innocent and sweet memories of Ramadan. Some of us miss the previous iftar tables, some of us the mahyas, some of us the exhibitions in Beyazıt, these fragrant buns, these hot pitas, in short, we are all longing for something.

— Yakup Kadri Karaosmanoğlu

The lights also made an impression on foreign visitors, such as the poet Théophile Gautier, who was in Istanbul for Ramadan 1854:

The view from the Tepebaşı promenade was magnificent. On the other side of the Golden Horn, Constantinople was gleaming like the crown of an Eastern emperor; the balconies of the minarets of the mosques were decorated with oil lamp bracelets; verses from the Qur'an were shining from one minaret to the next, like fiery letters written in the sky from the pages of a holy book. At the New Mosque, Süleymaniye, and all the temples of Allah from Sarayburnu to Eyüp, mahyas were shining brightly and proclaiming the formulas of Islam with fiery sentences.

— Théophile Gautier

Other visitors described the lights in equally glowing terms, saying "The Turks have succeeded in bringing down the stars from the sky and using them to write between the minarets."

In the modern era, mahyas almost exclusively consist of electric lights, having replaced the older oil lamps. Nowadays Latin letters are more often used instead of traditional Arabic script, which was predominant before the 1930s.

== Variations ==
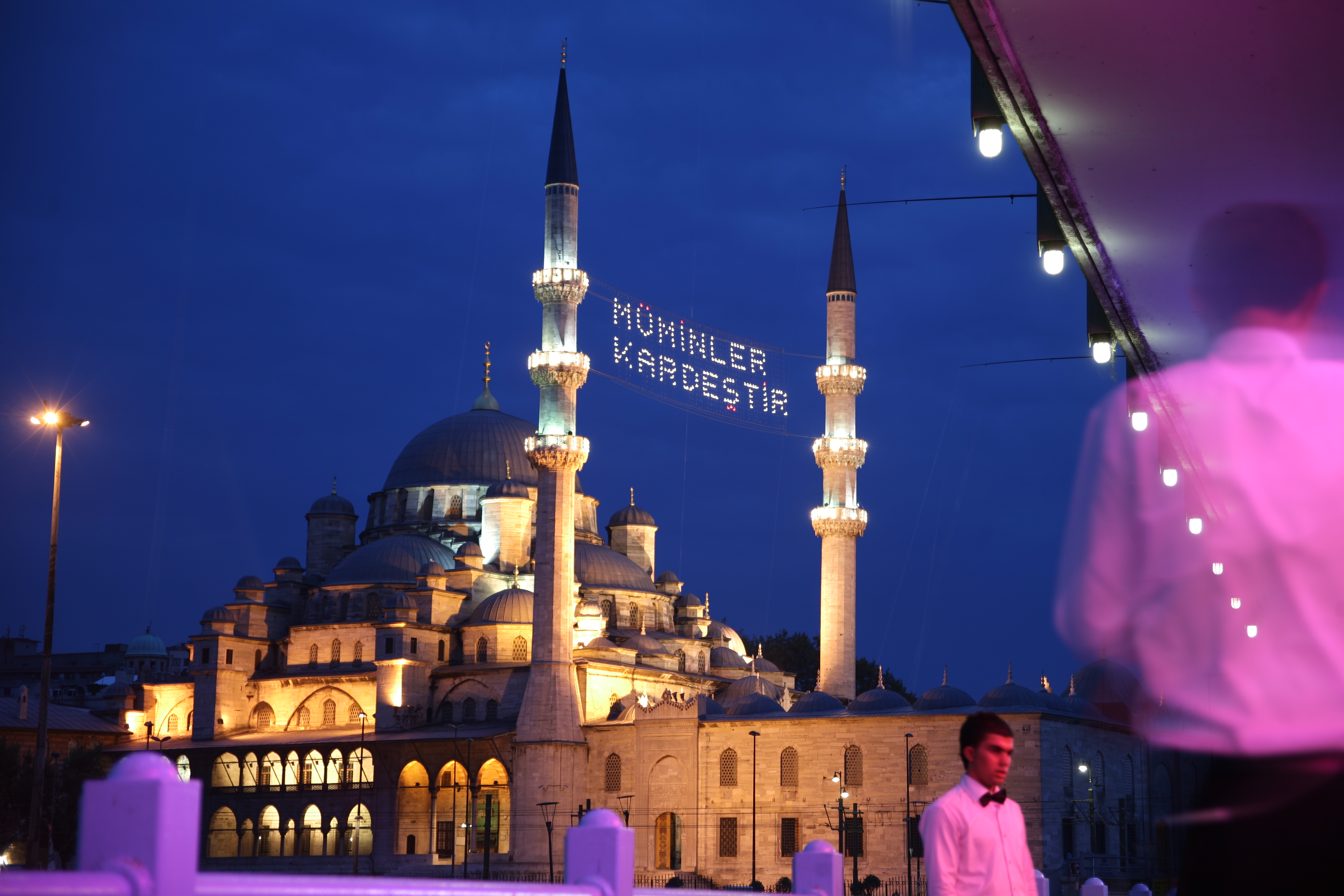
Mahyas at the New Mosque, as photographed from the Galata Bridge.

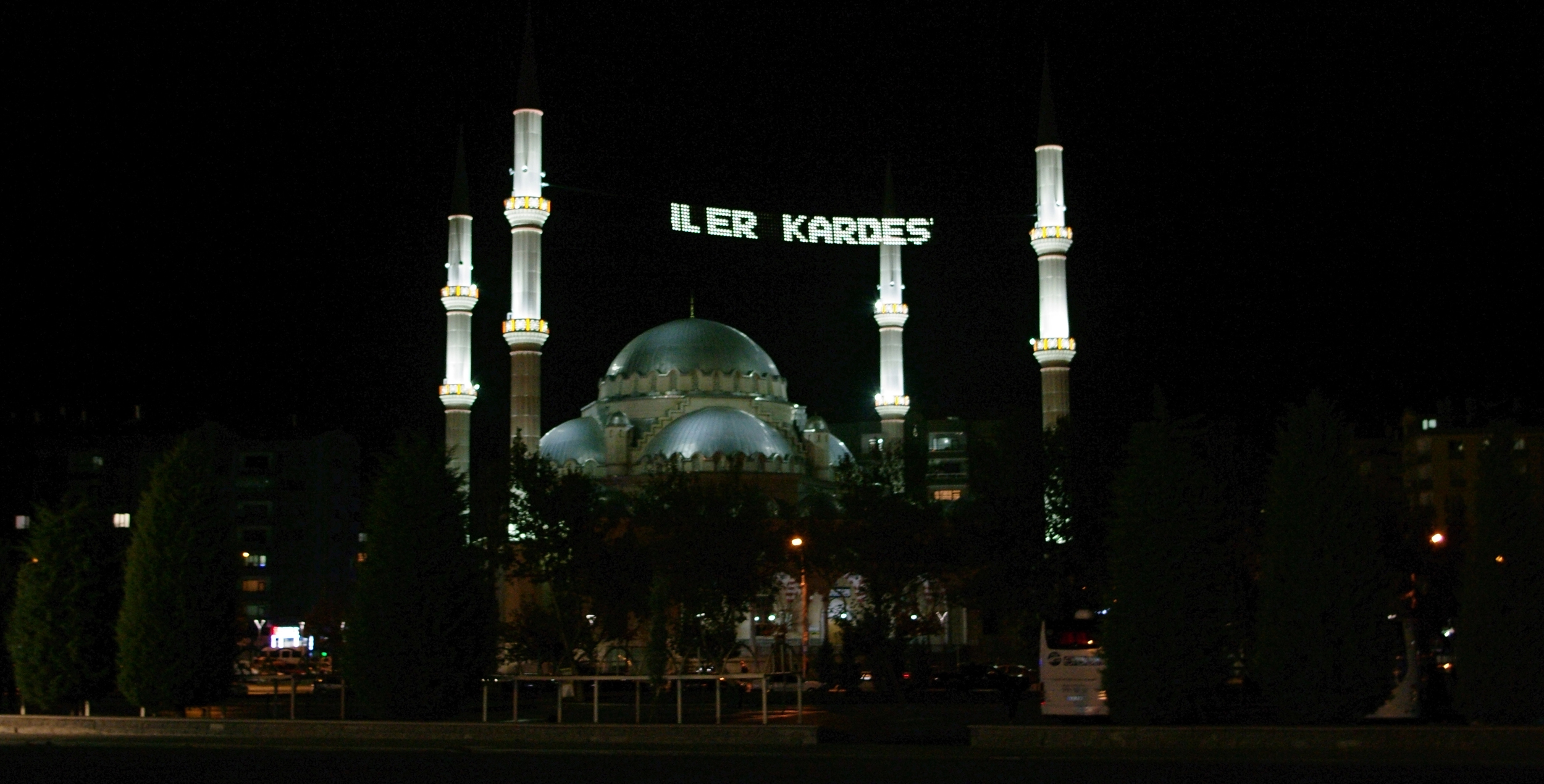
Mahya lights at the Zeki Altındağ Mosque in Konya.

The lights are often arranged to form Islamic words of devotion (La ilahe illallah - "There is no god but God"), well-wishes on the arrival of Ramadan (Hoş geldin, on bir ayın Sultanı - "Welcome, Sultan of Eleven Months"), or short sayings promoting charity, peace, and goodwill (İnfak et mutlu ol - "Give and be happy"; Müminler kardeştir - "All Muslims are brethren"; Sevelim sevilelim - "Let us love, let us be loved").

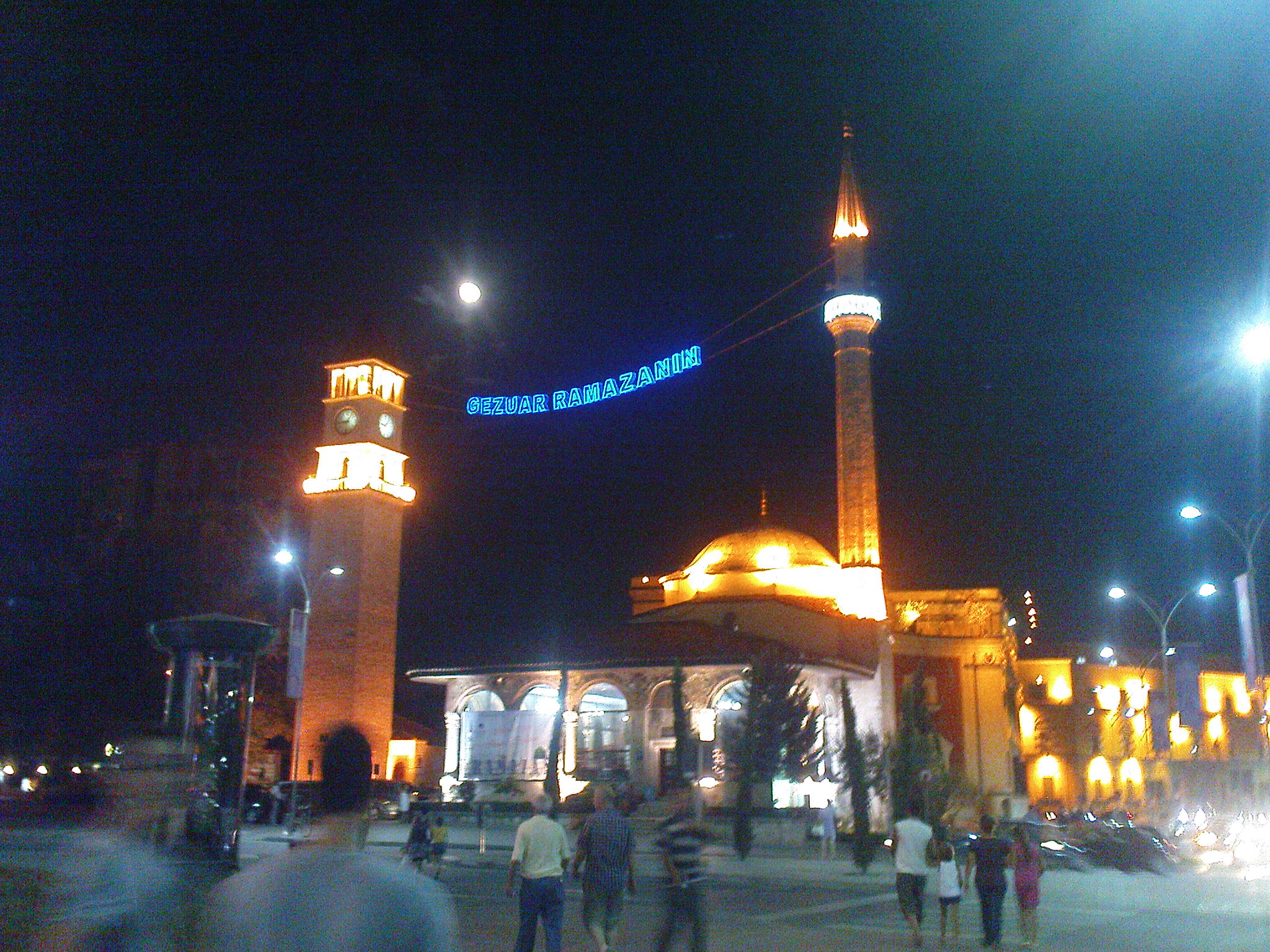
An example of Mahya lights outside Turkey: Gëzuar Ramazanin ("Happy Ramadan") at the Et'hem Bey Mosque in Tirana, Albania. As the mosque has only one minaret, the mahyas are conveniently stretched between the minaret and the nearby Clock Tower of Tirana.

Mahyas can also consist of pictorial designs. Motifs such as roses, daffodils, the Maiden's Tower, boats, ferries, pavilions, fountains, bridges, mosques, trams, and even gun carriages have been displayed. A skilled mahyacı can go so far as to design "animated" mahyas that appear to be moving, adding to their aesthetic quality.

Mahyas are not always strictly confined to religious festivals. On occasions such as the visit of Reza Shah of Iran to Istanbul, special mahyas were commissioned to mark the event. Mahyas with specific patriotic messages were also put up during World War I ("Remember the Red Crescent"; "Love of the Fatherland is part of faith"; "Do not forget the muhacirs") and during the Turkish War of Independence ("Long live independence"; "Long live the Misak-ı Millî"). To commemorate the establishment of the Turkish Aeronautical Association, the minarets of Selimiye Mosque in Edirne were adorned with the association's logo: a stylised aeroplane. During the COVID-19 pandemic, messages such as "Ramadan is the month of recovery" could be seen.

On mosques with a single minaret, the mahyas can be slightly inclined with the ropes stretched between the minaret balcony and the finial of the dome. Such mahyas, by necessity, can only accommodate shorter messages due to the limited space. Alternatively, the minaret can be illuminated with mahya lights from top to bottom, in a style known as "caftan dressing" (kaftan giydirme).

== See also ==
- Kandil
- Fairy lights
- Rope light
