= Tirana Clock Tower =

- Kulla e Sahatit të Tiranës
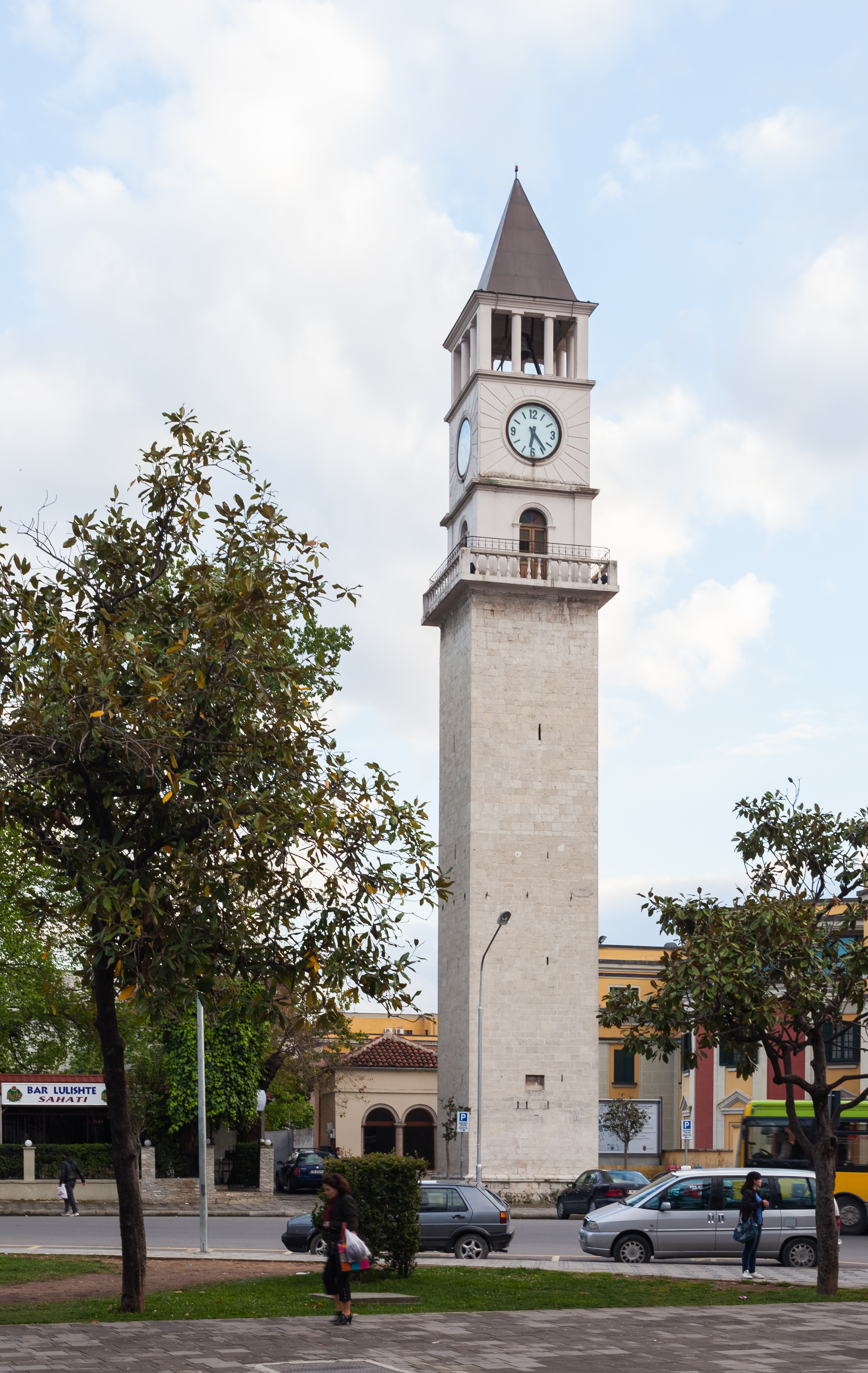
- Clock Tower of Tirana
- 41.32774°N 19.81968°E
- Type: Clock tower
- Location: Rruga "28 Nëntori", Tirana, Albania

History
- Founder: Et'hem bey Mollaj
- Built: 1822–1830

Site notes
- Height: 32.5 m (107 ft)
- Restored: (2010)
- Owner: Municipality of Tirana

Cultural Monument of Albania
- Type: Cultural
- Criteria: Cat. I
- Designated: 16 October 1948; 15 January 1963; 10 June 1973

The Clock Tower of Tirana (Albanian: Kulla e Sahatit të Tiranës) is an Ottoman-era monument of cultural heritage located in Tirana, Albania. It was first recognized as a cultural heritage site by the Institute of Sciences through decision no. 95 on October 16, 1948. Subsequent designations were made by the rectorate of the State University of Tirana under decision no. 6 on January 15, 1963 and by the Ministry of Education and Culture via reference no. 1886 on June 10, 1973.

== History ==
In the 1820s, Tirana, with a population of approximately 13,000 inhabitants, had already become one of the main cities in Ottoman Albania. The 19th century marked a period of significant growth, at which time, a mosque built by Molla Bey and his son, the bejtexhi poet Haxhi Et’hem Bey, became a notable city landmark. Following the construction of the mosque’s minaret, Et’hem Bey also built the clock tower and a madrasa.

The completion of the clock tower in 1238 Hijri (1822 CE) was commemorated by poet Shaban “Hulusi” Bey Toptani (d. 1833) in a chronogram dedicated to Haxhi Et’hem Bey.

A differing source suggests that the clock tower's construction had begun in 1822 and was completed in 1830, funded by contributions from Tirana’s wealthy elite. Haxhi Et’hem Bey employed skilled craftsmen, including artisans from the Gollobordë region, for its construction.

The earliest visual documentation of the clock tower appears in two watercolor paintings by English artist Edward Lear on September 28, 1848. Albanologist Georg von Hahn described the tower as having Rococo stylistic influences—although not entirely accurate, this description captures the decorative nature of its structure. European authors such as Ami Boué and Hyacinthe Hecquard have also mentioned the clock tower in their 19th-century works and researcher Gabriel Louis-Jaray compared it to the belfries of old French cities.

The assembly of the clock mechanism was credited to the Tufina family, renowned for their expertise in horology. They had been tasked with maintaining the clock tower until 1973.

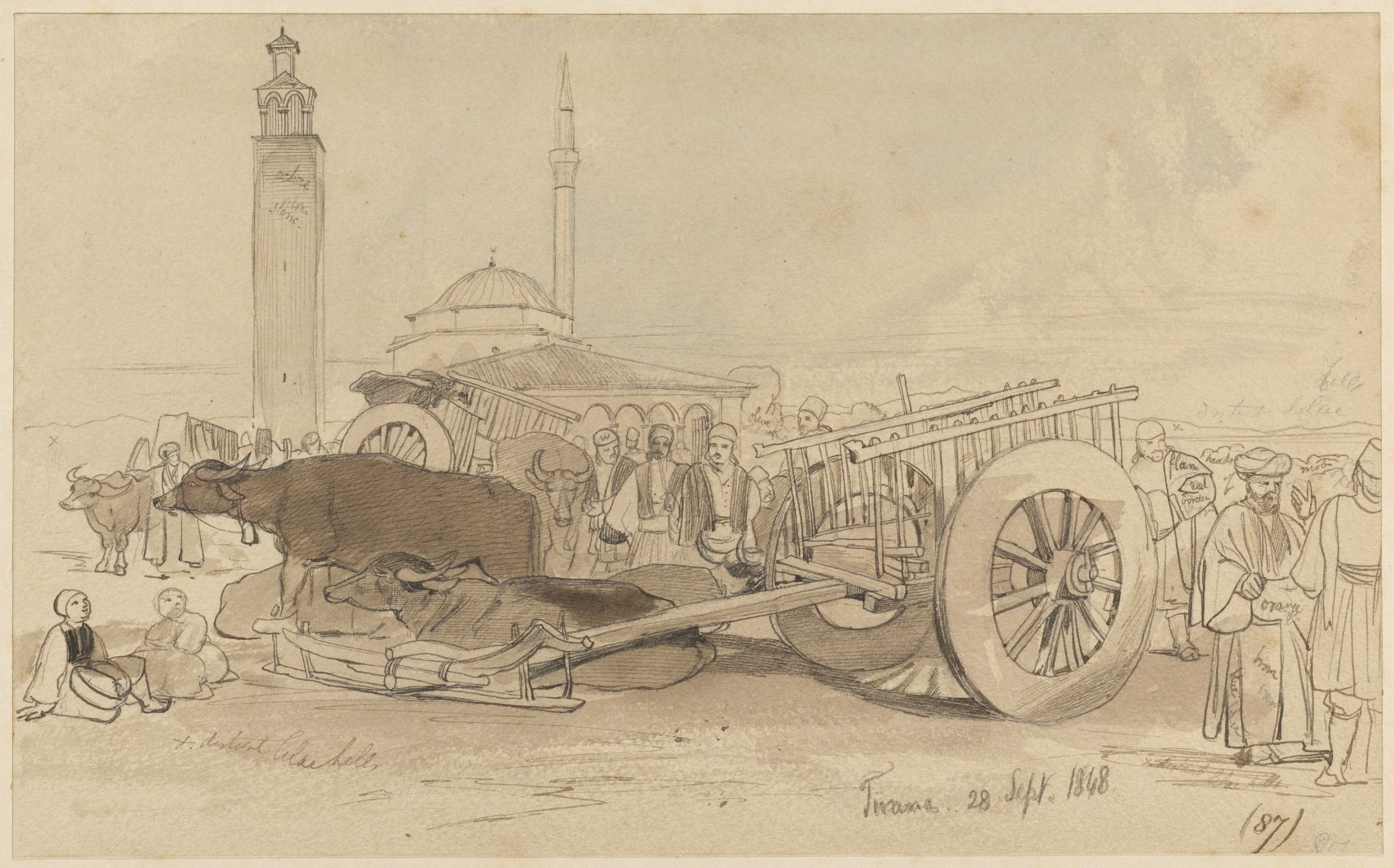
Pencil drawing of Et'hem Bey mosque and the clock tower by Edward Lear (September 28, 1848).

In 1928, the tower underwent renovation works when it took on its present appearance. At that time, the Albanian government purchased and installed a new clock mechanism from Germany, costing 13,390 gold francs. The original mechanism, a valuable piece of engineering, had been looted by Austrian forces during World War I. The tower was illuminated for the first time at night during the 1930s.

The clock tower sustained damage during World War II but was repaired and resumed operation in July 1946. Gjush Shkreli, a mechanic from Tirana Post Telecom, proposed that the same clock mechanism used on the Great Church of Shkodër be adopted to restore its functionality. During communist rule, a red star was placed atop the tower. In 1974, a new electric mechanism from China was installed which powered a network of street clocks in the city, although it could not replicate the traditional sounds of the original mechanism.

The clock tower underwent a comprehensive restoration, completed on February 11, 2010. Two inscriptions remain visible: one in Italian, reading “F. & PAOLO ACCERBONI IN TRIESTE”, and the other in Ottoman Turkish, dated the 7th of Cemazi’ul-Evvel 1254 H (July 29, 1838). These inscriptions reveal that the clock’s bell was cast at the Accerboni brothers’ foundry in Trieste on July 29, 1838.

The bell, measuring 0.74 meters in diameter and 0.6 meters in height, is decorated with intricate floral motifs. Currently, it is cracked and punctured with seven holes, likely a result of damage inflicted during World War II. In their retreat, German forces targeted the clock tower with mortar shells, damaging its mechanism and striking the bell.

== Architecture ==
The clock tower is situated in Tirana's city center, adjacent to Et'hem Bey Mosque. It is a type III clock tower, characterized by three floors and represents the first variant of this type, where the second floor is open. (Note: A type III clock tower consists of three floors. The first floor is similar to that of the two-story design: tall, enclosed by thick stone walls and housing the movement of the weight stones. With the introduction of a more complex clock mechanism, an additional floor was incorporated between the first and second floors, specifically to accommodate the mechanism. This category includes two variations: in the first, the second floor is open, while in the second, that same floor is enclosed, serving as the space designated for the clock mechanism.) The tower stands on a 1-meter-high plinth with a square base measuring 4.27 x 4.28 meters. The stones for its construction were brought from the hills of Priskë, while the interior is lined with shingle stones bound with mortar. The transition from plinth to the main structure is marked by a horizontal, profiled frame.

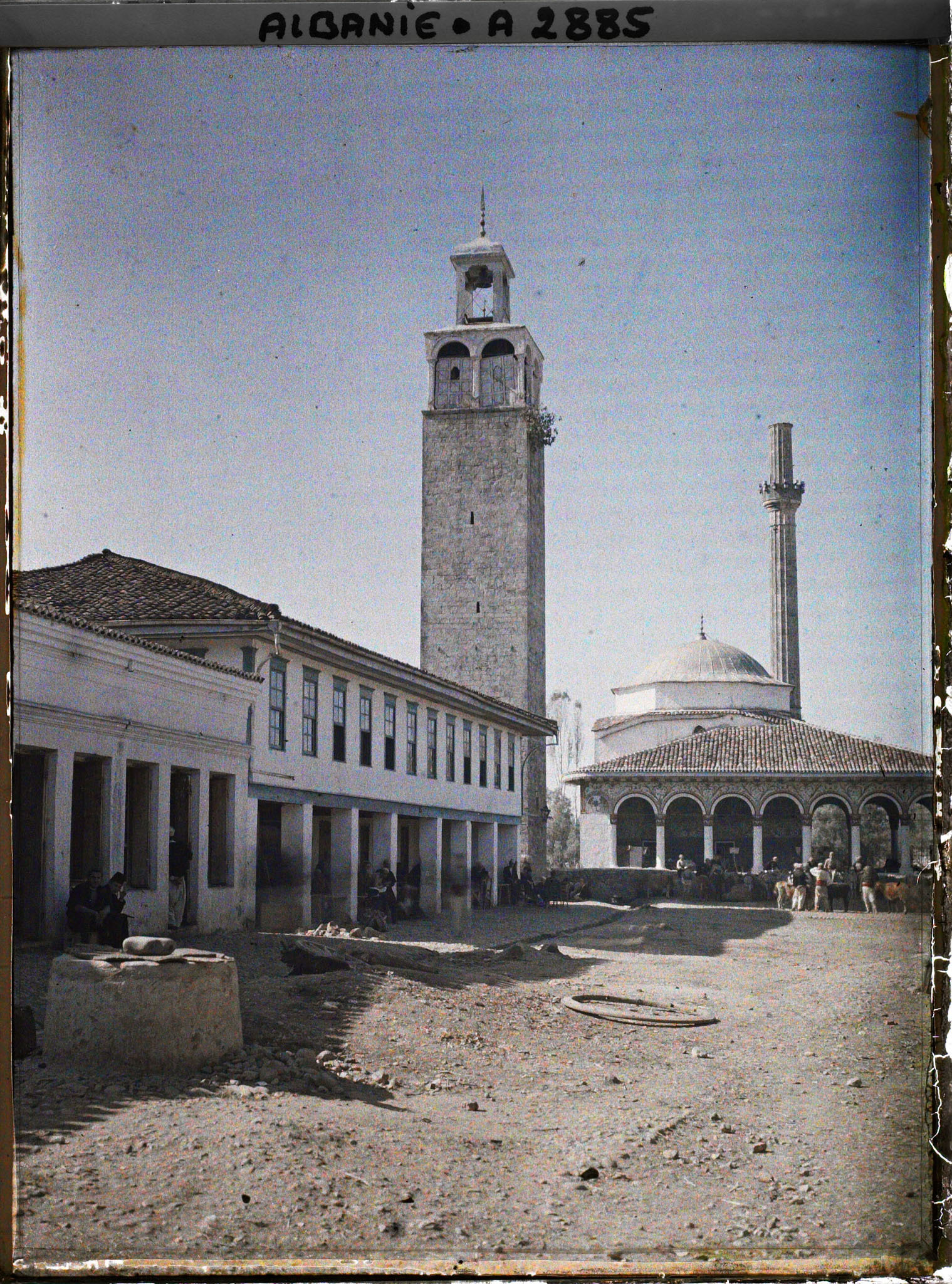
The clock tower in 1913

The clock tower currently stands at a height of 32.5 meters, with wall thickness varying between 1.18 and 1.29 meters. Its exterior is constructed from finely cut stones arranged in rows of varying heights with thin mortar joints. Approximately midway up the structure, three metal braces are embedded on each of its four sides.

The entrance to the tower, located on the southern side, is reached via a short flight of steps. The gate is topped by a semicircular arch of carved stone and framed on three sides by a stepped border made of stones with curved profiles. The entrance features six elegantly crafted stones, which contribute to its aesthetic appeal. Inside, a metal ladder leads to the upper levels.

The balcony, located just below the clock mechanism, is accessible through four arched doors and features a surrounding console-supported walkway with a parapet of concrete railings. Above this level is the clock maintenance room, which houses the clock faces and their mechanisms. Higher up, the open bell chamber is supported by columns. From the balcony level to the uppermost architraves, the structure is plastered and painted in white. The tower is capped with a prism-shaped roof on a quadrangular base.

On the northern facade of the clock tower, in the 41st row of stones, are two notable stone reliefs: a dragon on the right and a plant motif on the left.

The original clock tower, from the current balcony level upward, featured eight stone columns connected by arches (two on each side). This section was covered with a wooden roof clad in lead sheets. Above this was the bell chamber, supported by four wooden columns, topped with a chapel-like pyramidal roof, also covered in lead.

In its modern form, only the original first floor of the tower remains. Subsequent alterations have significantly changed the appearance of the tower, leading to the loss of certain traditional architectural elements, while raising theoretical concerns about the methods and principles applied during the monument’s conservation and restoration phases.

Occasionally, mahya lights are strung up between the clock tower and the minaret of the Et'hem Bey Mosque, especially during festive seasons such as Ramadan and Bajram.

== See also ==
- Landmarks in Tirana
- Culture of Tirana
