= Symbols of Kavajë =

Flag of Kavajë
- Adopted: 2002
- Design: A blue rectangle with a golden circle drawing depicting a clock tower, lines shaped to represent geographical and historical elements, text.
- Designed by: Musa Qarri

The official emblem and flag of Kavajë Municipality were approved by the Municipal Council in 2002. They were chosen between two final variants selected in a competition organized by City Hall. The winning proposal was designed by noted graphist and painter Musa Qarri. The variant which received 2nd place was designed by Fredi Yzeiri.

== Design ==
At the center of the flag, displayed is the emblem which consists of the clock tower, regarded as the symbol of the city; beneath the clock tower, a diamond shaped triangle in golden yellow represents wheat crops, to give the impression of a farming town; a distorted letter V that hovers below symbolizes the first anti-communist movement in Albania; the blue background conveys the color of the sea, in reference to Kavajë's coastline.
