= Mahfil =

Mahfil or Mehfil may refer to:

- Müezzin mahfili or dikka, a raised platform in a mosque
- Mehfil or mahfil, an indoor gathering featuring music, dance, and poetry reading
- Mahfil (film), a Hindi film of 1981
- Mehfil (TV series), an Indian TV series
- Mehfil Magazine, a Canadian-based South Asian lifestyle magazine 1993–2010
