= National Institute of Cultural Heritage (Albania) =

Albanian Government Cultural organelle

Instituti Kombëtar i Trashëgimisë Kulturore
- Established: 19 December 1965 (59 years ago)
- Director: Rudina Zoto
- Address: Rr. Aleksandër Moisiu Nr.76, Kinostudio
- Location: Tirana, Albania
- Website: iktk.gov.al

The National Institute of Cultural Heritage (Albanian: Instituti Kombëtar i Trashëgimisë Kulturore, IKTK) is a government entity of Albania which focuses in protecting, preserving, restoring and revitalizing materials of cultural heritage.

== Overview ==
The institute was founded on 19 December 1965. As an official entity, it is under the umbrella of the Ministry of Culture. Its task is to enable and enforce legislation with regards to monuments of cultural heritage and their impact on tourism. It strictly cooperates with local governments and other scientific, cultural, and religious organizations in the country.

In 2007, the institute was named after its first director, the architect Gani Strazimiri.

== Periodicals ==
- Monumentet, OCLC 3460148.

== See also ==
- Cultural heritage of Albania
- List of Religious Cultural Monuments of Albania
- List of castles in Albania
