= Et'hem Bey Mosque =

Sunni mosque in Tirana, Albania

- Xhamia e Et’hem Beut
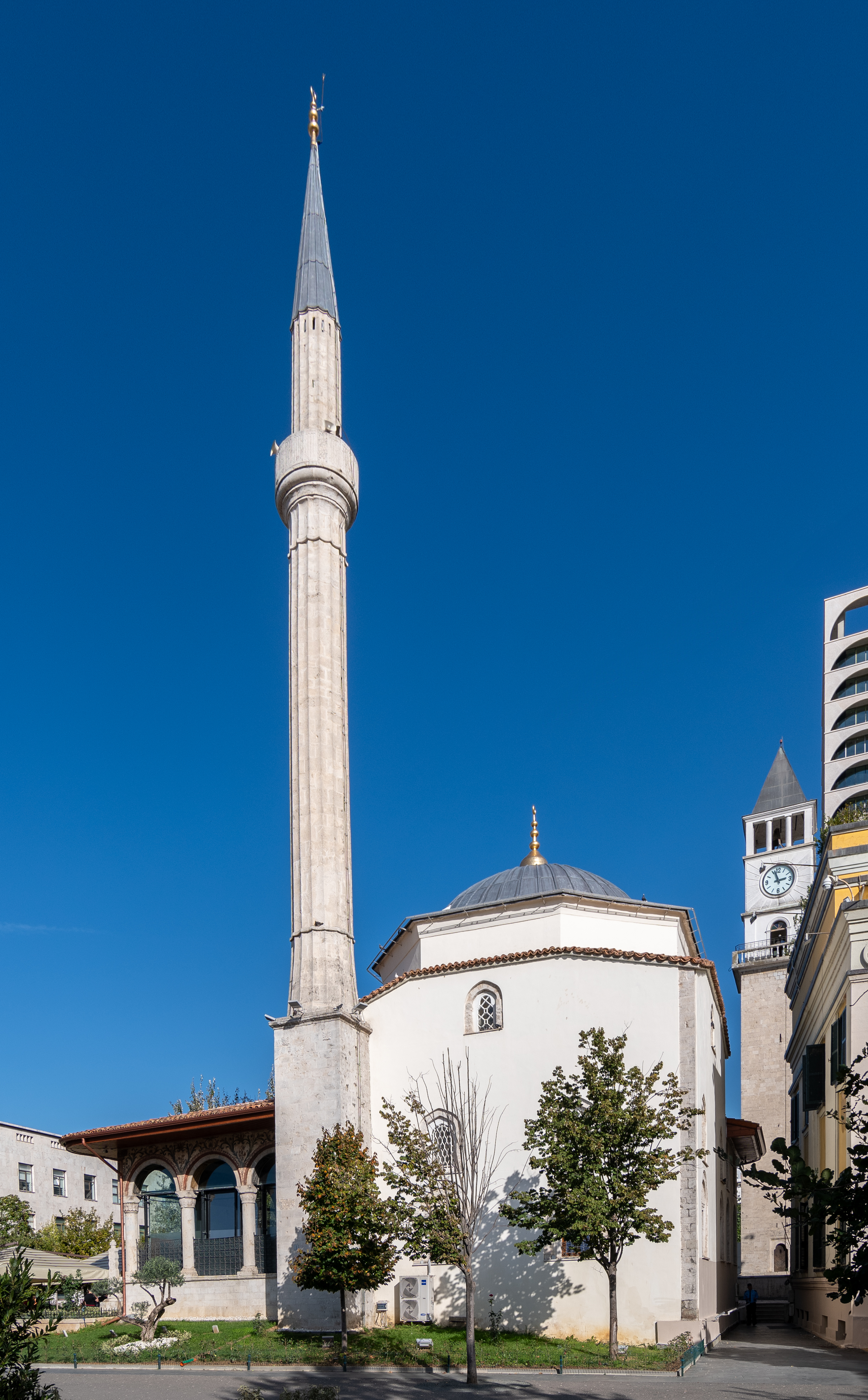
- Them mosque in 2024

- Location of the mosque in Albania

Religion
- Affiliation: Sunni Islam
- Ecclesiastical or organisational status: Mosque: (c. 1821–1967); (since 1991– )
- Status: Active
- Architectural features: Interior and exterior frescoes

Location
- Location: Tirana, Tirana County
- Country: Albania
- Interactive map of Et'hem Bey Mosque
- Coordinates: 41°19′40″N 19°49′9″E

Architecture
- Type: Islamic architecture
- Style: Ottoman
- Founder: Molla Bey; Haxhi Ethem Bey
- Groundbreaking: c. 1794
- Completed: c. 1821

Specifications
- Dome: 1
- Minaret: 1

Cultural Monument of Albania
- Official name: Mosque of Ethem Beu
- Designated: 24 May 1948
- Reference no.: TR152

The Et'hem Bey Mosque, officially the Haji Et'hem Bey Mosque (Albanian: Xhamia e Haxhi Et'hem Beut, Turkish: Hacı Edhem Bey Camii), is a Sunni mosque located in Tirana, Albania. The mosque is well known for its frescoes outside and inside the portico which depict trees, waterfalls and bridges.

Closed alongside other houses of worship during the Communist rule of Enver Hoxha, the mosque reopened as a house of worship in 1991. Without permission from the authorities, 10,000 people attended and the police did not interfere. The mosque consists of an architectural complex together with the Clock Tower of Tirana. Tours of the mosque are given daily, though not during prayer service. Visitors must take their shoes off before entering the inner room.

== History ==
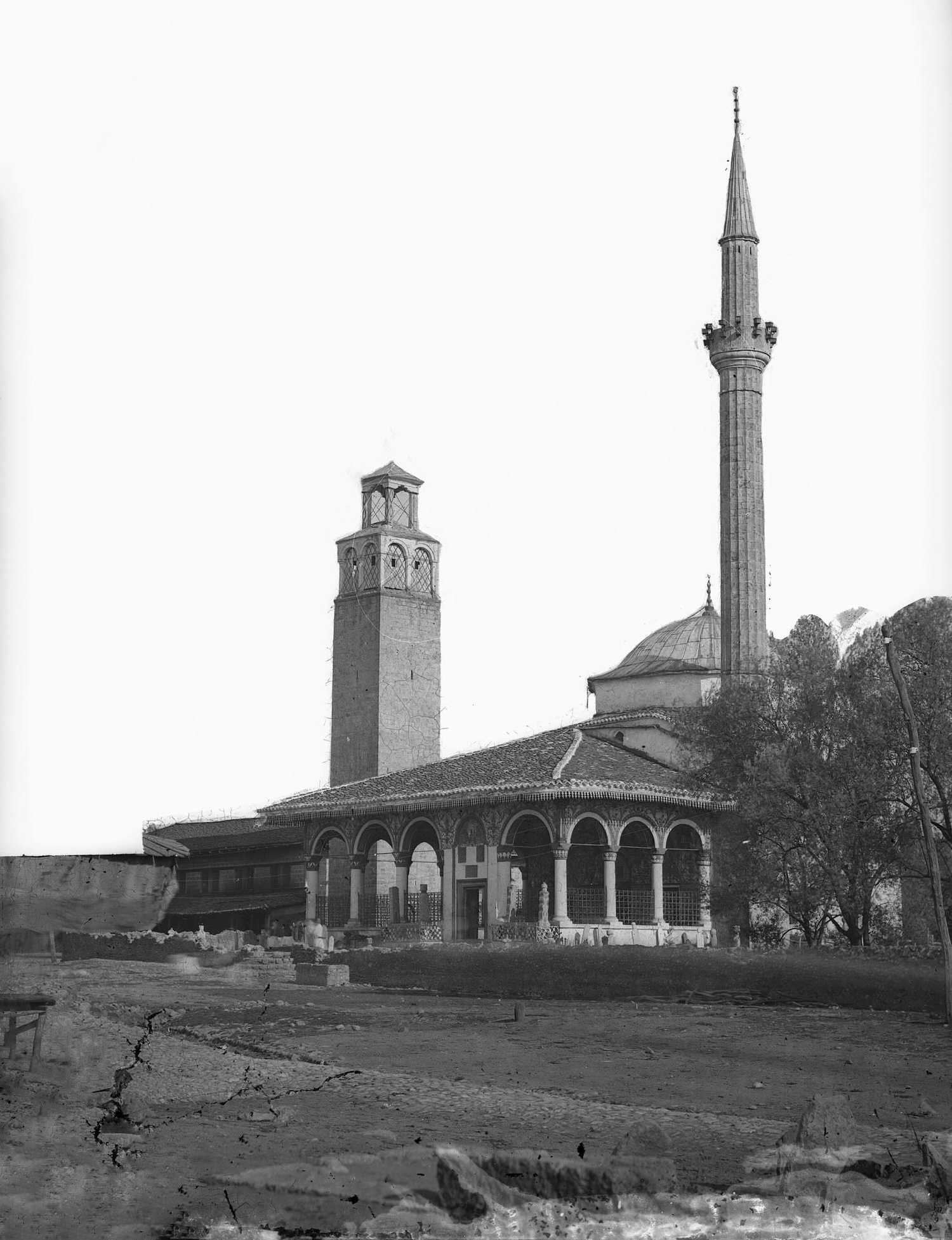
With the clock tower seen here in a 19th century photograph by Pietro Marubi.

Construction was started in 1791 or 1794 by Molla Bey and it was finished in 1819 or 1821 by his son Haxhi Ethem Bey, a great-grandson of Sulejman Pasha.

At the time it was built it was part of complex buildings that compose the historical center of Tirana. In front of the mosque was the old Bazaar, in east the Sulejman Pasha Mosque, which was built in 1614 and destroyed during World War II, and in the north-west the Karapici mosque.

During the totalitarianism of the Socialist People's Republic of Albania, the mosque was closed; it was declared a historical monument and underwent restorations in the late 1960s and early 1970s. On January 18, 1991, at the onset of the fall of communism in Albania, despite opposition from communist authorities, 10,000 people entered the mosque carrying flags. The event was a milestone in the rebirth of religious freedom in Albania.

== Architecture ==
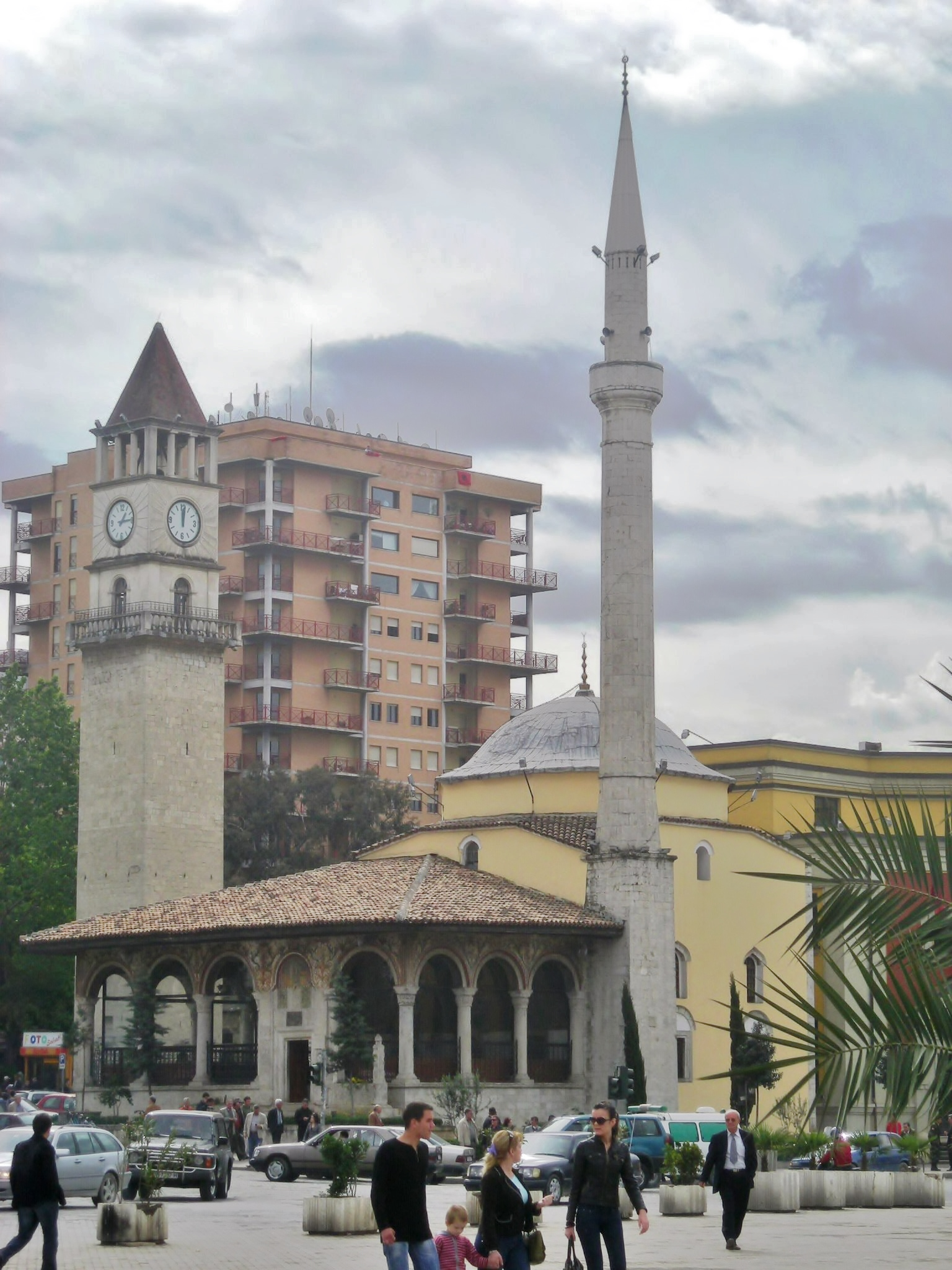
The mosque before its restoration in 2008

The Et'hem Bey Mosque is composed of a prayer hall, a portico that surrounds its north and the minaret. On the north side is the entrance to the prayer hall, which is a squared plan and is constructed in a unique volume. It is covered with a dome and the dome is semi-spherical and has no windows. The frescoes of the mosque depict trees, waterfalls and bridges. In the interior part of the mosque, on the eastern side of the prayer hall and in the prayer area of women, Süleymaniye Mosque is shown among other landscapes, with its four minarets, same as it appears in the Bachelors' Mosque in Berat. Most of the scenes that appear in mural paintings, are not realistic paintings, but imaginary scenes. The portico of the mosque is decorated by numerous landscapes as well.

According to Kristo Frashëri, in the painting of the mosque's portico, an island is portrayed with a river that flows through it where the boats sail. In one of the chronograms in the mosque, it is written that “the mosque has given eternal beauty to the city, as Hagia Sophia has given to Istanbul”.

The author of the verses recalls the idea of Hagia Sophia, which does not appear on mural paintings. The identification of Süleymaniye mosque with Hagia Sophia is almost understandable. The Süleymaniye mosque, positioned on the third hill, dominated the skyline of the city of Istanbul. Under the image of the former Byzantine basilica of Hagia Sophia, the Süleymaniye mosque was seen as a “progeny of the Hagia Sophia”.

== Gallery ==
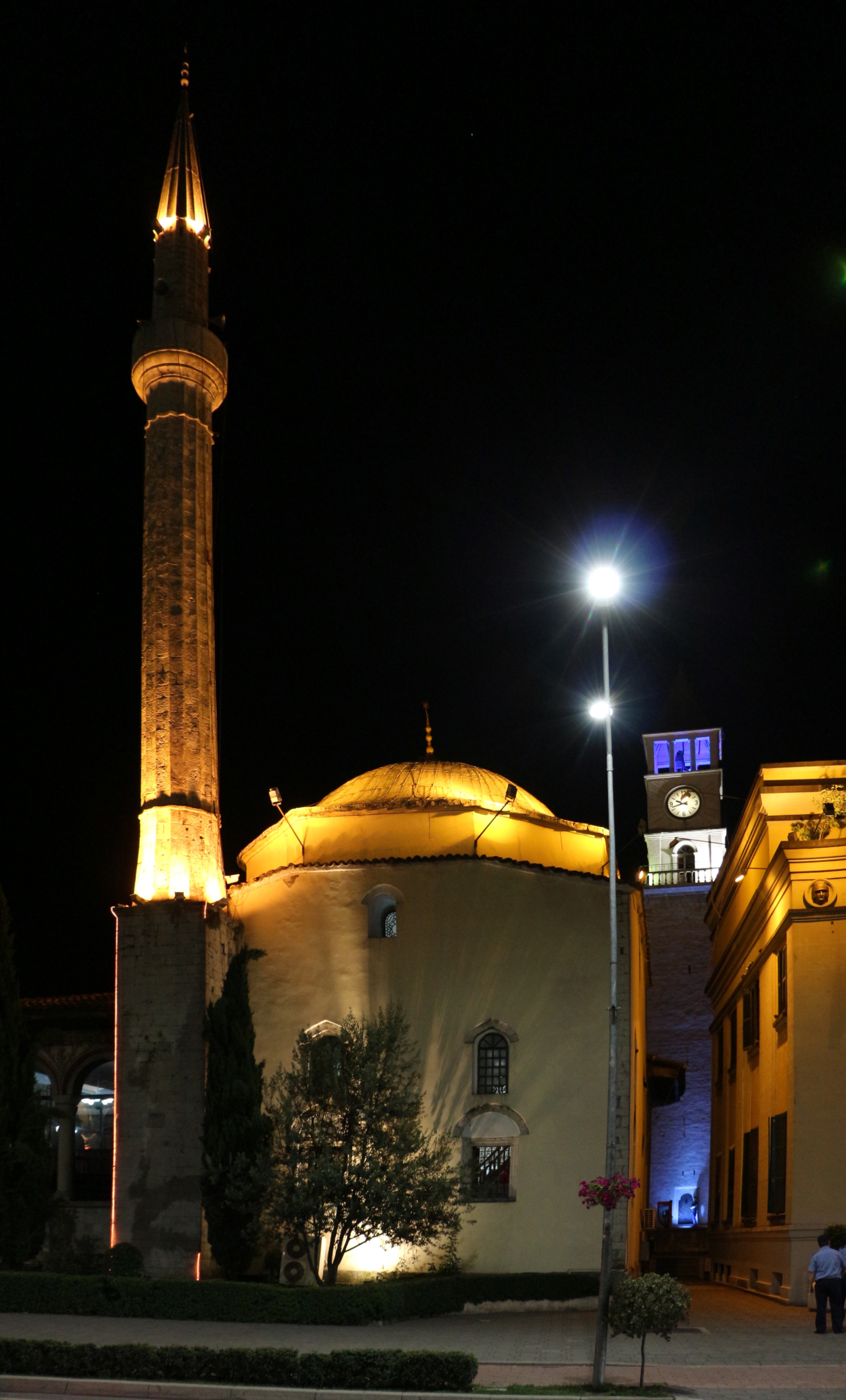
The mosque at night

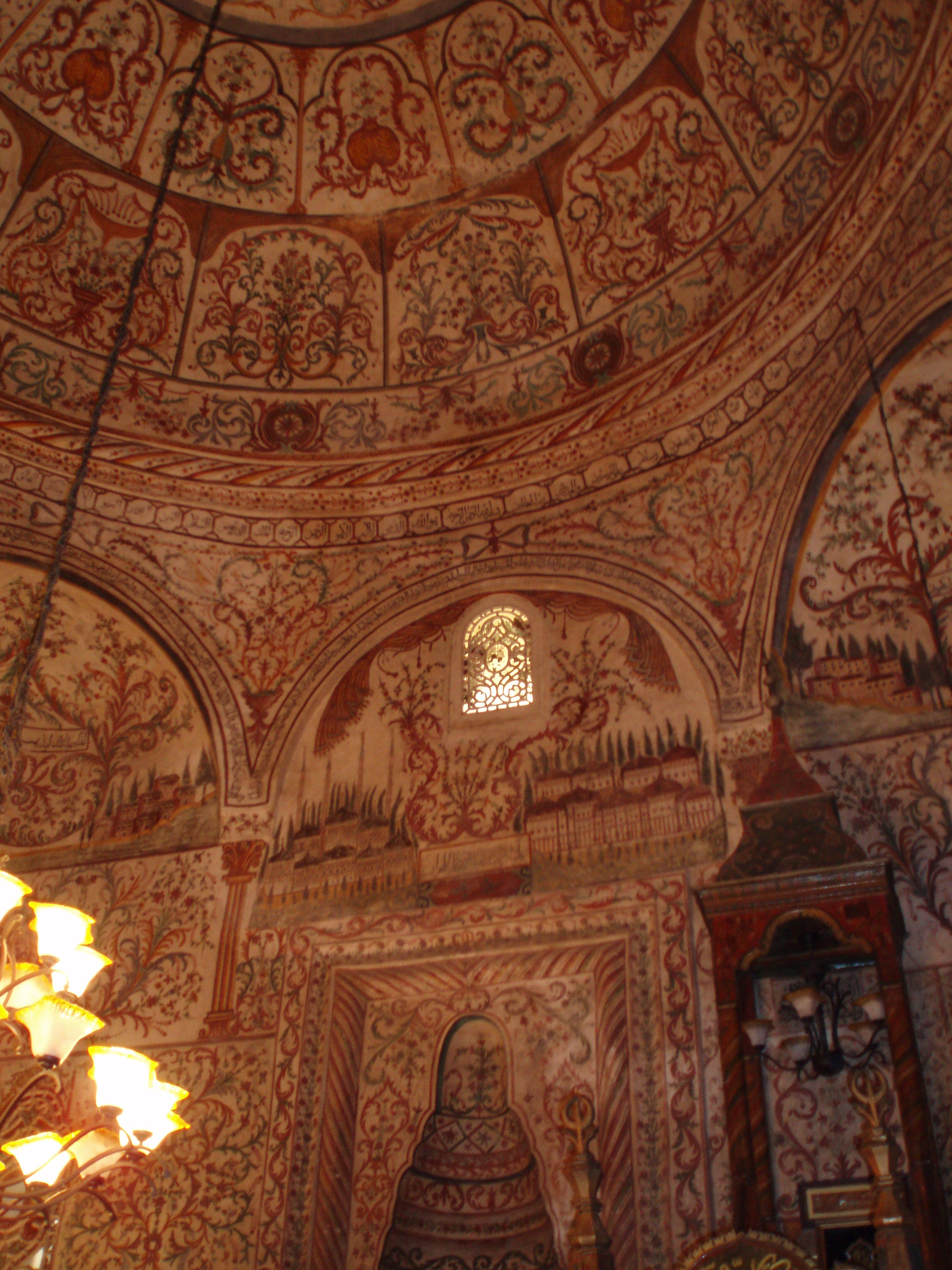
Interior of the mosque

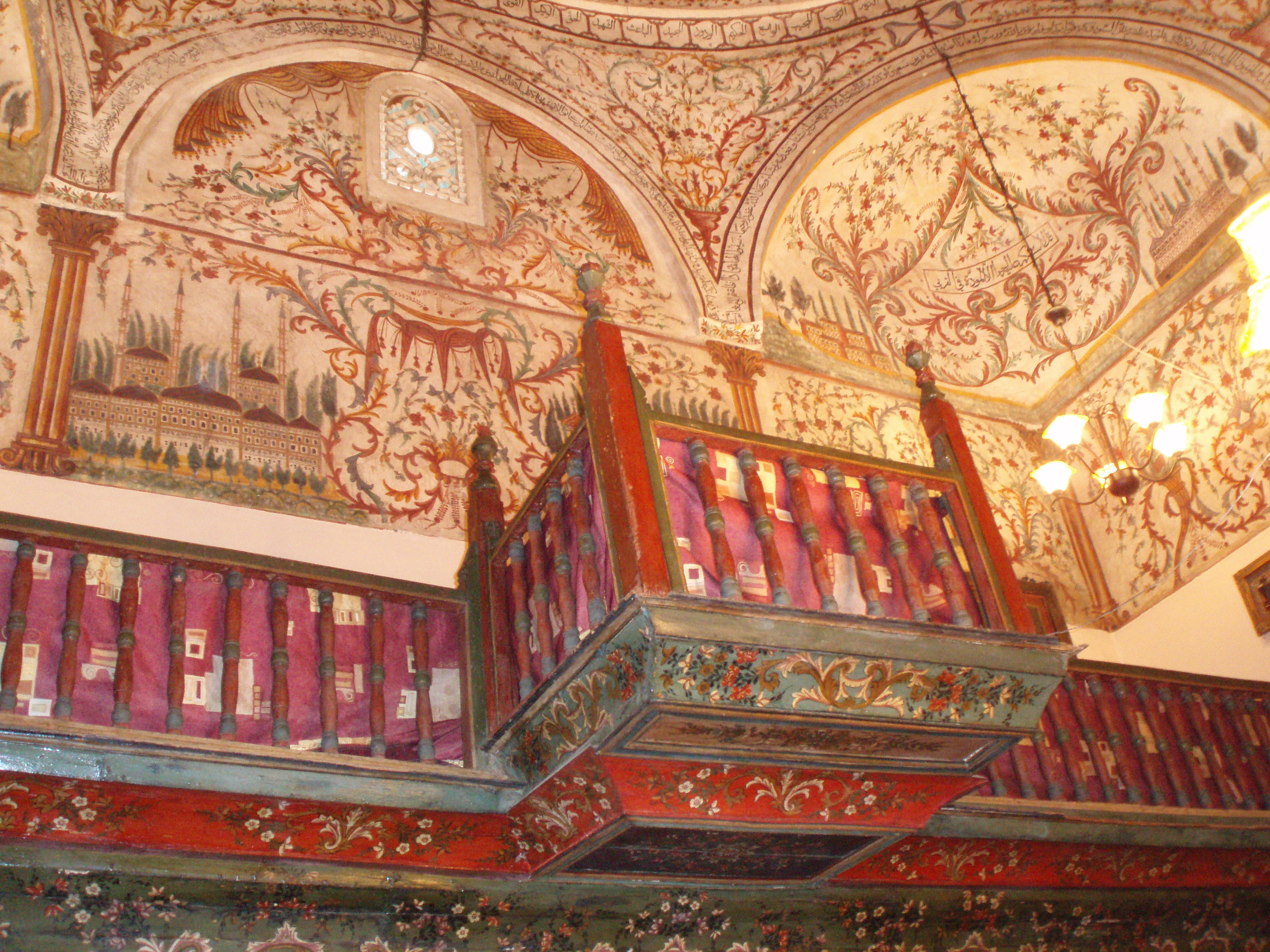
Mahfil of the mosque

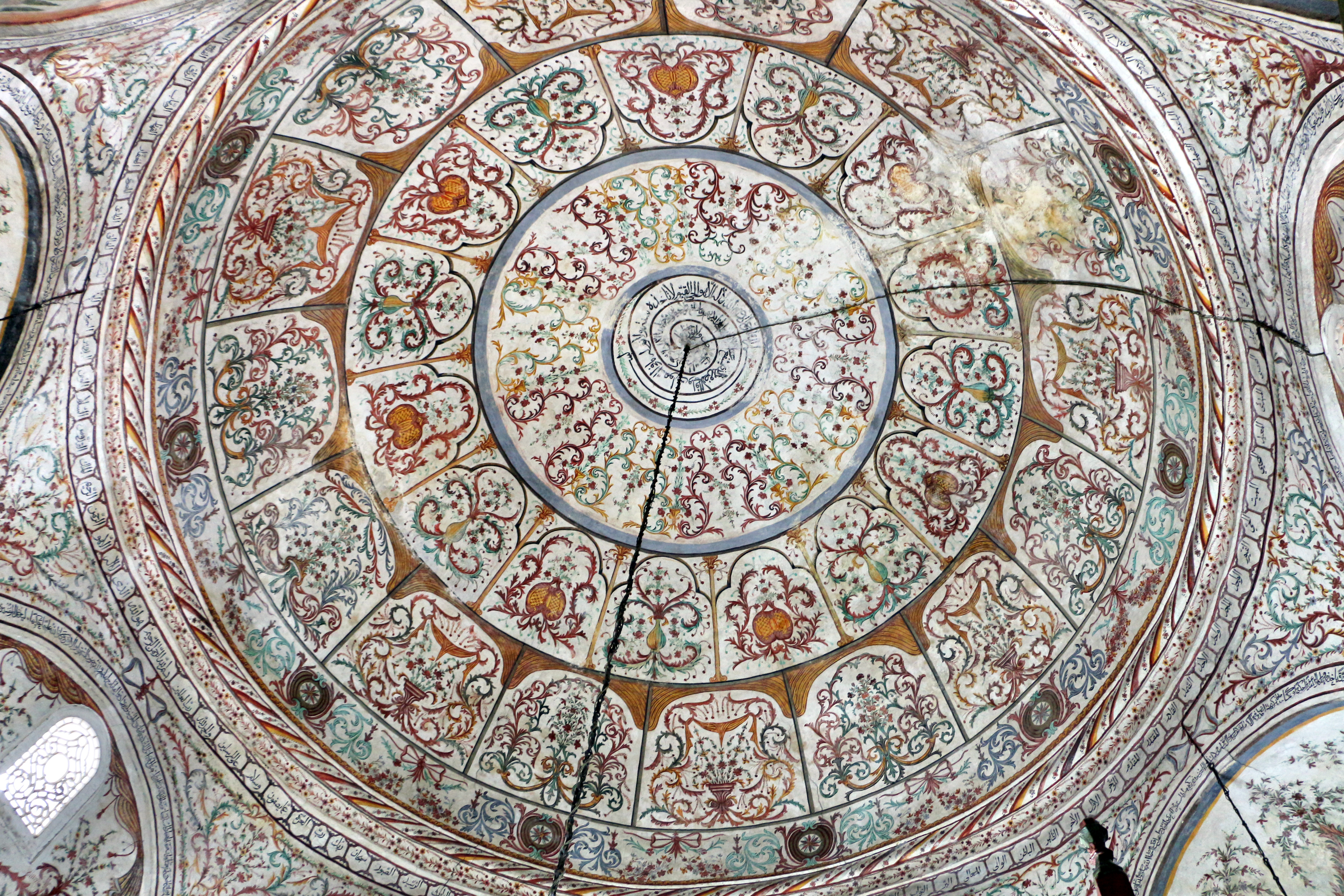
Ceiling of the mosque

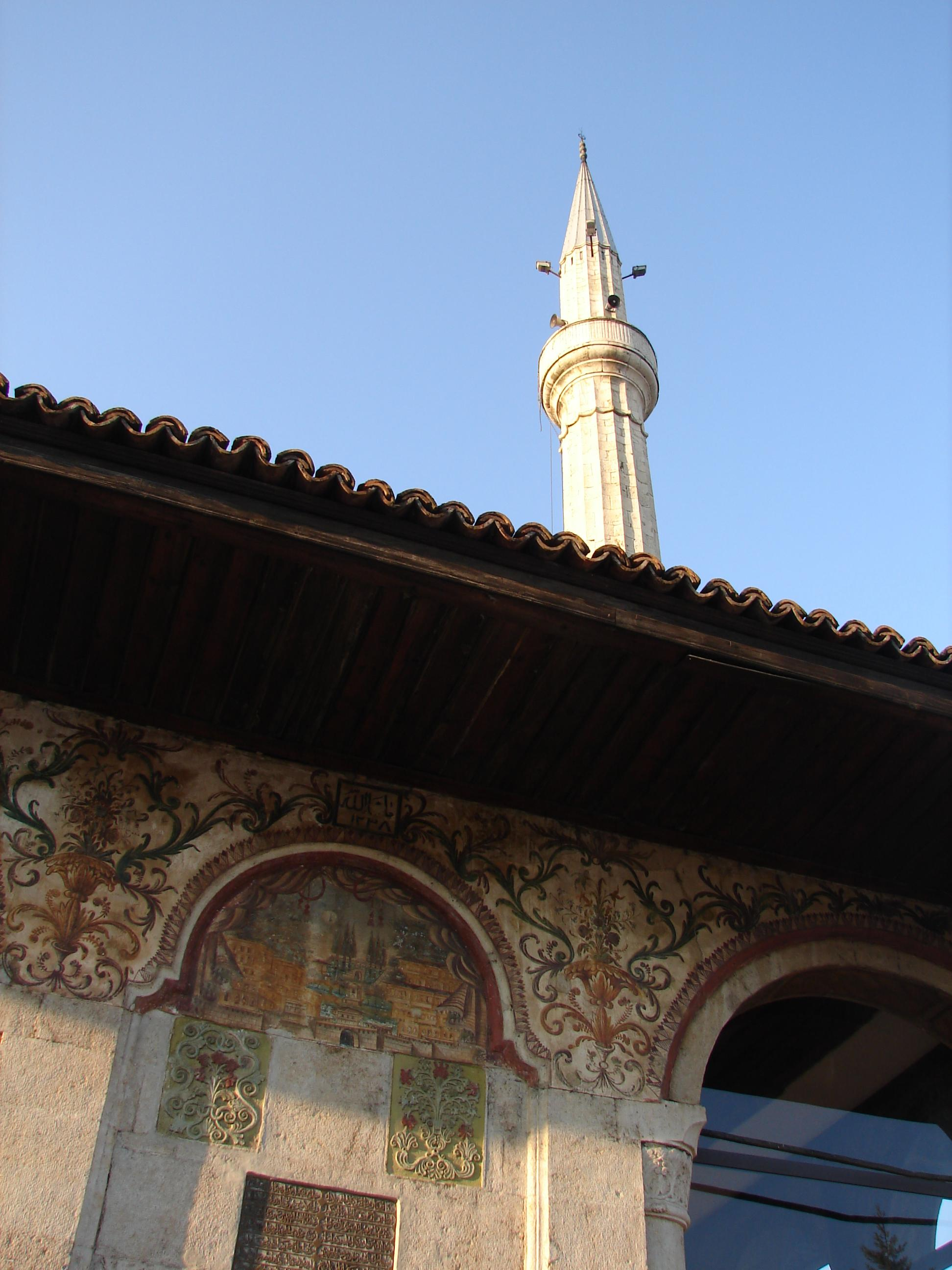
Detail

== See also ==
- Islam in Albania
- List of mosques in Albania
