= Musa Qarri =

Albanian painter

Musa Qarri (born 1943) is an Albanian painter/graphist notable for his work "The Monument of March 26" which brought him national attention. Most of his paintings are focused on life and landscapes in the region of Kavajë. He is the author of over 60 book covers and illustrations. Qarri's work "Asfaltimi i rrugëve" won an award at the 1983 Alexandria Biennale.
