= Fortress of Justinian =

- Kalaja e Tiranës (Albanian)
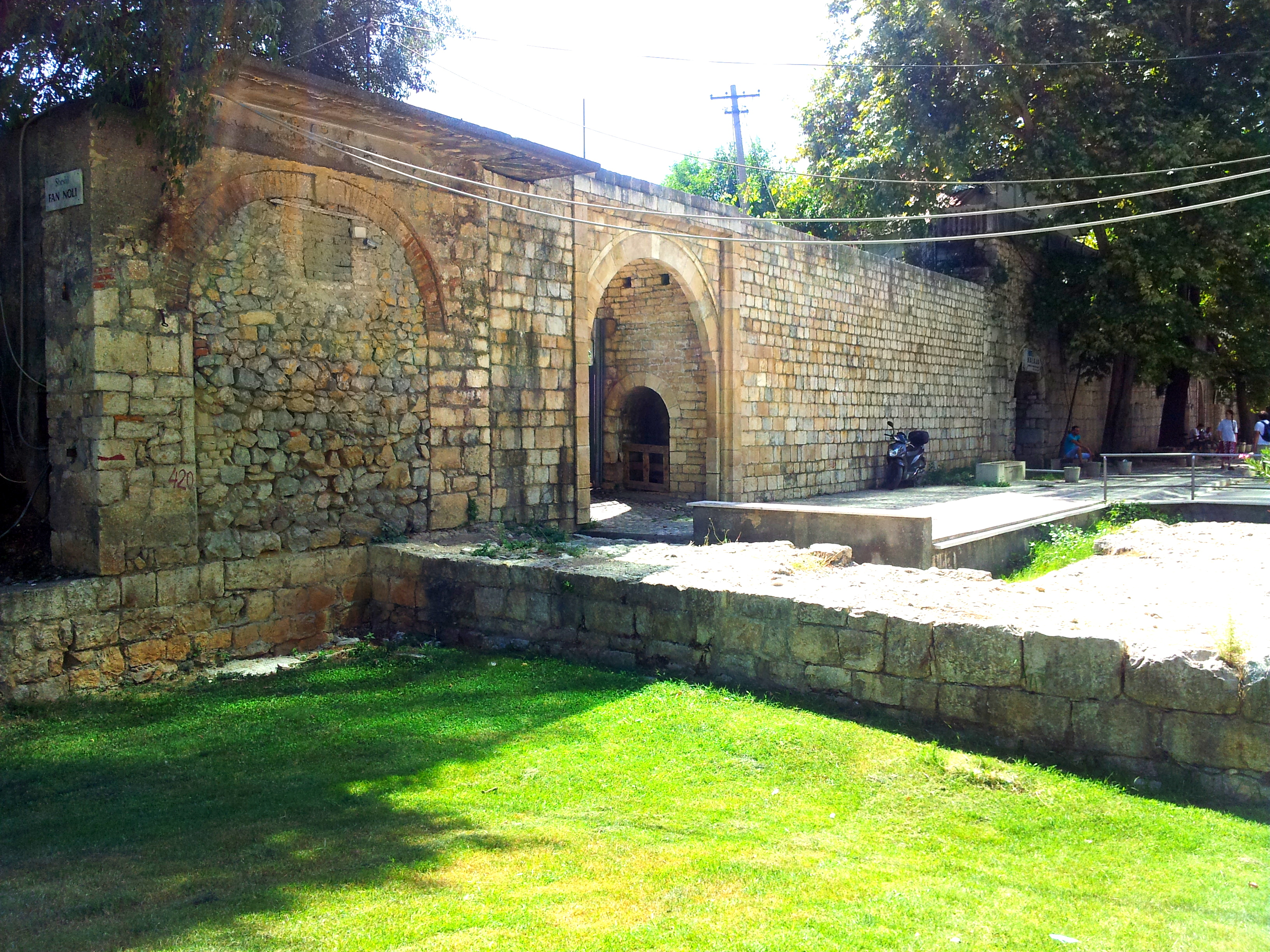
- Castle of Tirana

- Location within Albania
- 41°19′35″N 19°49′19″E
- Location: Tirana

Site notes
- Height: 6 m (20 ft)
- Current use: Open to the public
- Owner: Albania
- Website: kalajaetiranes.al

Cultural Monument of Albania
- Designated: 10 June 1973

Fortress of Justinian (Albanian: Kalaja e Justinianit) or simply known as Tirana Castle (Albanian: Kalaja e Tiranës) is a castle in Tirana, Albania. Its history dates back before 1300 and is a remnant from the Byzantine-era. The fortress is the place where the main east–west and north–south roads crossed, and formed the heart of Tirana. The current fortification has three known towers and it is undergoing a process of restoration, for touristic purposes. Inside the fortified walls of the former fortress, there are many buildings that can be visited, including restaurants, hotels, and cultural institutions.

About all that is left of the fortress above ground is a 6-metre (20 ft) high Ottoman-era wall, covered in vines. The recently uncovered wall foundations were incorporated into the pedestrianised Murat Toptani Street, while a mosaic commemorating the 100th Anniversary of Albania's Independence was unveiled near the Albanian Parliament.

The Castle of Tirana was declared a monument of culture of first category on 10 June 1973 and the new tracks of walls of Tirana Castle were declared a cultural monument on 15 May 2008.

== Traditional bazaar ==
In December 2018, a new traditional bazaar was opened inside Tirana Castle with various traditional hand crafts stores and traditional cuisine restaurants.
