= Molla Bey of Petrela =

Ottoman-Albanian religious leader

Molla Mehmet Bey known as Molla Bey of Petrela (d.1806 or 1808) was an Ottoman-Albanian religious leader and benefactor from Tirana. Born with the name Mehmet, he was a descendant of Sulejman Pasha Bargjini, the Ottoman Albanian general from nearby Mullet who transformed Tirana into a developed commercial and religious center.

Molla Bey started the construction of the Et'hem Bey Mosque, a Cultural Monument of Albania, and also a point of reference due to its location in the Scanderbeg square, the main square of Tirana. The construction year lies between 1791 and 1794. Various sources place the start year in 1791, 1793 (1208 in Hijri), or 1794, and after Molla Bey's death his son Haxhi Etëhem Bey Mollaj finished it in 1819 or 1821.
