= Et'hem bey Mollaj =

Albanian administrator, nobleman and bejtexhi

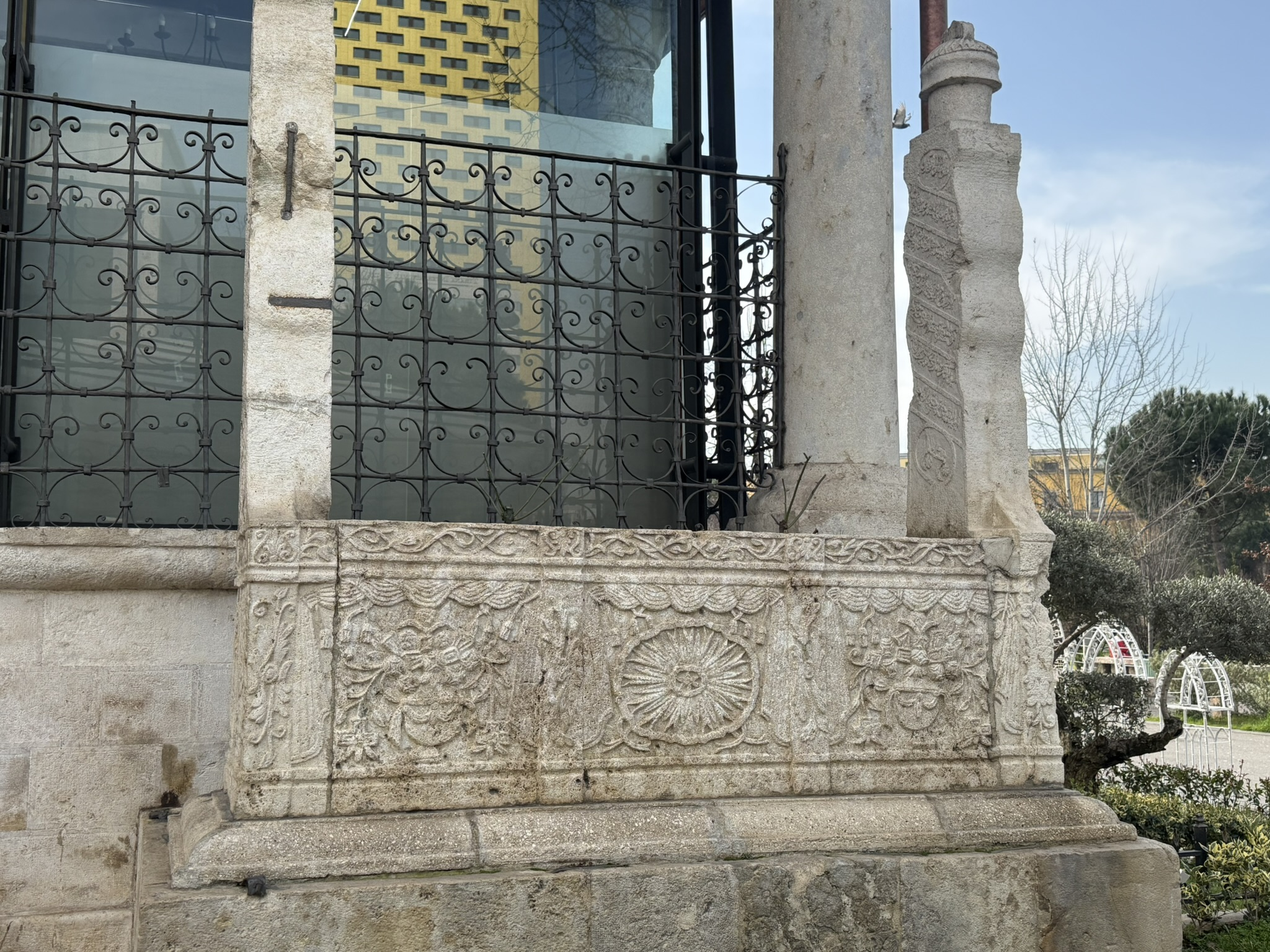
The resting place of Etehem Bey and his wife Balkis which - unlike other graves - did not get destroyed during the Communist dictatorship and which still can be seen right of the entrance

Haxhi Etëhem Bey also known as Haxhi Et'hem bey Mollaj (1783–1846) was an Ottoman Albanian administrator, nobleman and bejtexhi.

Et'hem Bey was the son of Molla Bey of Petrela, from one of the prominent families of the Tirana area, back then part of the Ottoman Albania. He is descendant of Sulejman Pasha Bargjini, who gave the main contribution to the development of Tirana as a commercial and religious center. His family was an opponent of the powerful Toptani family and connected to the Bushatlliu family of Shkodra. As a result, Abdyl Rahman Toptani exiled him away from Tirana. He would reconcile later with the Ottoman rulers by joining the Ottoman campaign against Mustafa Pasha Bushati in 1831.

Etëhem Bey finished in 1819 or 1821 the Ethem Bey Mosque in the main square of Tirana, which bears his name. The mosque was started by his father Molla Bey between 1791 and 1794. He was buried in Ethem Bey Mosque, next to his wife Balkis.

Etëhem Bey was also a diwan poet. He wrote both in Turkish and Albanian. His work in Turkish consists of 4 diwans. In Albanian he wrote a Bektashi mystical poem and a diwan, out of which nothing has survived. For the Turkish work, he used the pen-name "Shehidi" (the Martyr).
