= Pogradec District =

Defunct (2000) Albanian administrative area

Pogradec District Rrethi i Pogradecit
- Former district
- Coordinates: 40°55′N 20°35′E
- Country: Albania
- Dissolved: 2000
- Seat: Pogradec

Area
  - Total: 725 km^{2} (280 sq mi)

Population (2001)
  - Total: 70,900
  - Density: 97.8/km^{2} (253/sq mi)
- Time zone: UTC+1 (CET)
  - Summer (DST): UTC+2 (CEST)

Pogradec District (Albanian: Rrethi i Pogradecit) was one of the 36 districts of Albania, which were dissolved in July 2000 and replaced by 12 newly created counties. It had a population of 70,900 in 2001, and an area of 725 km^{2} (280 sq mi). It is in the east of the country, and its capital was the city of Pogradec. The area of the former district is coextensive with the present municipality of Pogradec, which is part of Korçë County.

== Administrative divisions ==
The district consisted of the following municipalities:

- Buçimas
- Çërravë
- Dardhas
- **Pogradec**
- Proptisht
- Trebinjë
- Udënisht
- Velçan

Note: - urban municipalities in bold

== Places ==
- Alarup
- Blacë
- Bletas
- Mëmëlisht
- Peshkëpi
- Pogradec
- Udënisht
