= Golek =

Golek may refer to:

== Places in Iran ==
- Golek, Razavi Khorasan, a village in Golbahar County

== Places in Slovenia ==
- Golek, Črnomelj, a settlement in the Municipality of Črnomelj
- Golek, Krško, a settlement in the Municipality of Krško
- Golek pri Vinici, a settlement in the Municipality of Črnomelj

== Other uses ==
- Golek, a type of Javanese dance
- Cheryl Golek, American politician

== See also ==
- Golik, a surname
