= Mali Vlaj =

- Village
- Мали Влај
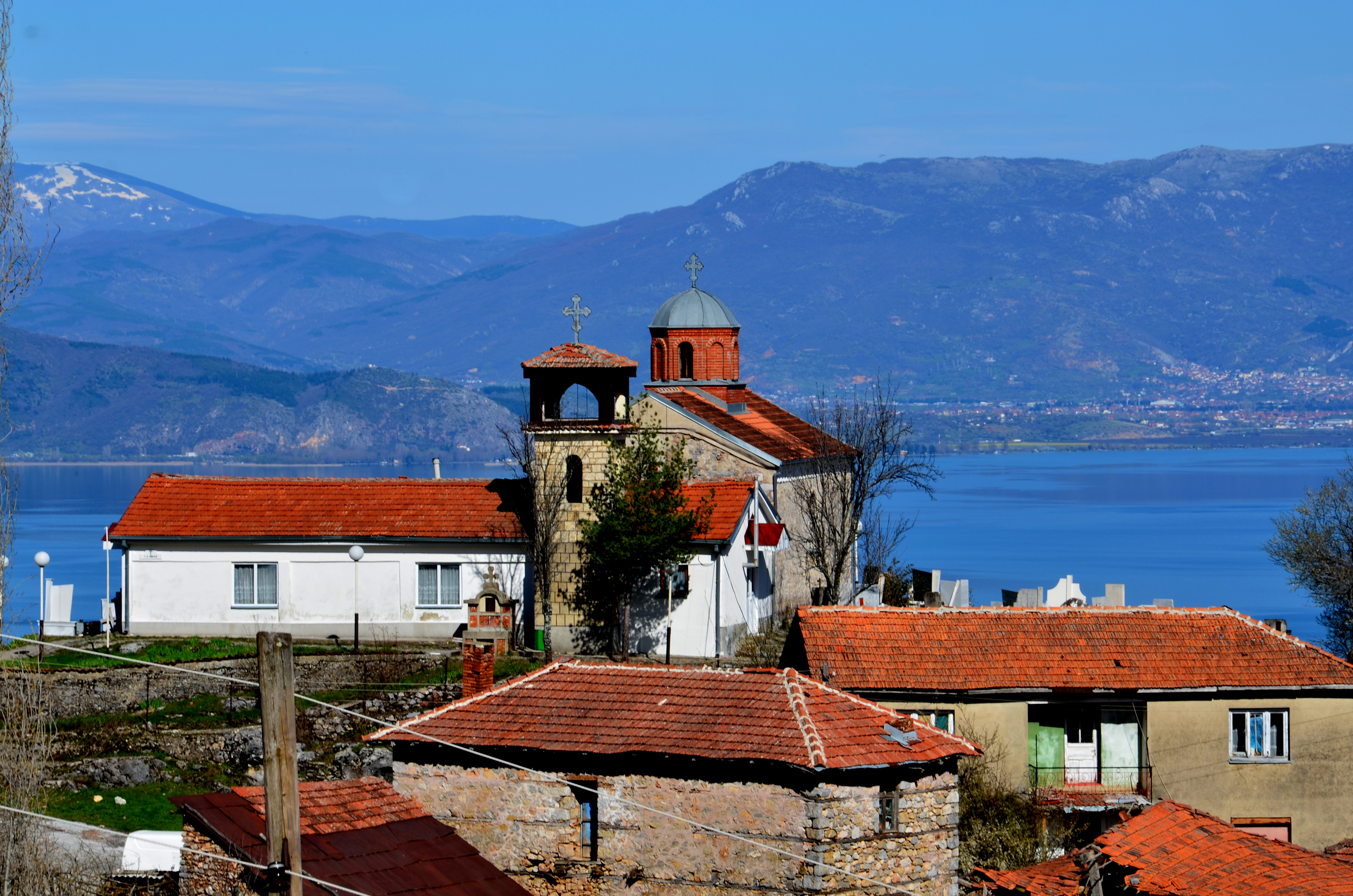
- St. Nicholas Church of Mali Vlaj

- Location within North Macedonia
- Coordinates: 41°07′09″N 20°36′56″E
- Country: North Macedonia
- Region: Southwestern
- Municipality: Struga
- Elevation: 857 m (2,812 ft)

Population (2002)
  - Total: 71
- Time zone: UTC+1 (CET)
  - Summer (DST): UTC+2 (CEST)
- Area code: +38946
- Car plates: SU
- Website: .

Mali Vlaj (Macedonian: Мали Влај or simply Влај) is a village on the Jablanica Mountain in the municipality of Struga, North Macedonia. In 1905, the village had 192 Christian inhabitants. In 2002, the village still had about 71 inhabitants.

== Name ==
The toponym is first recorded as a plural in the name Frougovi Vlasi. The form Vlaj is an old accusative occurring as a plural in Vlahy> Vlahi> Vlai> Vlaj and these forms stemmed from Vla(s)hci meaning residents from the village Vlas(c)i. The c sound in Vlahci was assimilated over time becoming Vlaj and the toponym is related to Vlachs. With the loss of the grammatical case in Macedonian, the toponym Vlaj was no longer understood in the plural, instead in the singular. The adjective Мали/Mali meaning "small" contained in the names of some villages is usually used if there is an opposition to a larger settlement with the word Голем/Golem meaning "big" or in toponyms without an additive. Nearby there is no appropriate toponym with the adjective "large" in modern times, yet it is possible that this settlement is in opposition to the village Rëmenj on the Albanian side of Lake Ohrid meaning Vlachs (Aromanians). In the Albanian language, Mali Vlaj is known by the forms Ërmas and Ermëz, meaning Vlachs.

== History ==
During the mid-fourteenth century, a document of Serbian Tsar Stefan Dušan refers to property of the Church of Sts. Clement and Panteleimon in Ohrid with the settlement recorded under the name Frugovi Vlasi, which later possibly broke up into two villages identified as being modern Mali Vlaj and nearby Frangovo. Local traditions in the Struga area refer to the residents of Mali Vlaj as originating from Rëmenj, Albania arriving in the late eighteenth century. Modern Mali Vlaj is without an Aromanian population though the Aromanian inhabitants of nearby Gorna Belica and Dolna Belica remember that once the village was populated by Aromanians.

== Demographics ==
Mali Vlaj was inhabited by Aromanians, belonging to the Frashëriot subgroup that originated from Albania and became assimilated during the course of the 19th century. The Vevčani-Radožda dialect of Macedonian is spoken in Mali Vlaj, that also contains some lexical differences distinguishing it from the speech of neighbouring Vevčani and Radožda.

According to the 2002 census, the village had a total of 71 inhabitants. Ethnic groups in the village include:

- Macedonians 71

== See also ==
- Tašmaruništa
