= Rëmenj =

- Village
- Location within Albania
- Coordinates: 40°52′50″N 20°39′40″E
- Country: Albania
- County: Korçë
- Municipality: Pogradec
- Administrative unit: Buçimas
- Time zone: UTC+1 (CET)
  - Summer (DST): UTC+2 (CEST)

Rëmenj is a village near Buçimas in Albania. At the 2015 local government reform it became part of the municipality Pogradec. Its name refers to the former presence of Aromanians in the area, drawing from the traditional Albanian rëmër, derived in Tosk Albanian from romanus.
