= 29th Mechanized Infantry Brigade (Greece) =

29th Mechanized Infantry Brigade "Pogradets"
- 29η Μηχανοκίνητη Ταξιαρχία Πεζικού "ΠΟΓΡΑΔΕΤΣ"
- Camp flag of the 29th Mechanized Infantry Brigade
- Active: 1913–1941; 1960–today
- Country: Greece
- Branch: Hellenic Army
- Type: Mechanized infantry
- Size: Regiment (1913-1941, 1960-2003); Brigade (2003-Present)
- Part of: IV Army Corps
- Garrison/HQ: Komotini, Western Thrace
- Mottos: We stand sleepless Ιστάμεθα άγρυπνοι Istametha agripni
- Engagements: Greco-Turkish War (1919-1922); World War II: Greco-Italian War; Capture of Kleisoura Pass; Battle of Greece

The 29th Mechanized Infantry Brigade "Pogradec" (Greek: 29η Μηχανοκίνητη Ταξιαρχία Πεζικού «ΠΟΓΡΑΔΕΤΣ», 29η Μ/Κ ΤΑΞ ΠΖ) is a mechanized infantry brigade of the Hellenic Army. It is headquartered in Komotini as part of IV Army Corps.

== History ==
The brigade traces its history to the 29th Infantry Regiment (Greek: 29ο Σύνταγμα Πεζικού, 29ο ΣΠ), which was founded in August 1913 in Edessa.

The regiment distinguished itself in the Asia Minor Campaign and the Greco-Italian War, where it participated in the battles of Kleisoura and Pogradec. Following the German invasion of Greece and the capitulation of the Greek Army, the regiment was disbanded on 14 April 1941.

The 29th Infantry Regiment was re-established on 15 May 1960 at Komotini, where it has remained since. On 15 September 2000 it received the honorific title "Pogradec". From 1 January 2003, it began to be expanded to the level of a brigade, and received the new title 29th Control and Security Brigade (29 Ταξιαρχία Ελέγχου Ασφαλείας, 29 ΤΑΞΕΑ) on 25 March of the same year. On 25 August 2005, it was converted to a regular infantry brigade under its current title. In 2005–09, the brigade's zone of responsibility extended into the prefectures of Drama and Kavala, but in December 2009 it was withdrawn east to the western boundary of the Xanthi Prefecture.

In the 2013 Army reorganization, the 29th Mechanized Infantry Brigade was reinforced with the addition of the 1st Reconnaissance Squadron (Α' ΕΑΝ), transferred from Amyntaio after the disbandment of II Army Corps.

== Emblem ==
The brigade's emblem features a red triangular shield upon which is depicted a map of Western Thrace with a soldier standing on guard before it. This is edged in white, with an inscription above with the unit's motto, Ιστάμεθα άγρυπνοι Istametha agripni ("We stand sleepless").

== Structure ==
- Brigade Headquarters Company (ΛΧΣ 29ης Μ/Κ ΤΑΞ ΠΖ)
- 29th Signals Company (29ος ΛΔΒ)
- 29th Medical Company (29ος ΛΥΓ)
- 1st Reconnaissance Squadron (1η ΕΑΝ)
- 511th Mechanized Infantry Battalion (511ο M/Κ ΤΠ)
- 557th Mechanized Infantry Battalion - Recruit Training Centre (557ο M/ΤΠ - KEN)
