= Byzantine Church, Lin =

Church in Albania

Byzantine Church
- Rrënojat e Kishës Bizantine (Albanian)
- Location within Albania
- Interactive map of Byzantine Church
- 41°04′34″N 20°37′36″E
- Location: Lin

History
- Built: 6th century AD

Cultural Monument of Albania

The Byzantine Church (Albanian: Rrënojat e Kishës Bizantine) is a ruined church in Lin, Korçë County, Albania. It is a Cultural Monument of Albania. The church has been included within the possible UNESCO site of the Natural and Cultural Heritage of the Ohrid Region (Albania).

The church was built during the 6th century AD, in the Justinian era.
