= Lin, Pogradec =

Lin
- Village
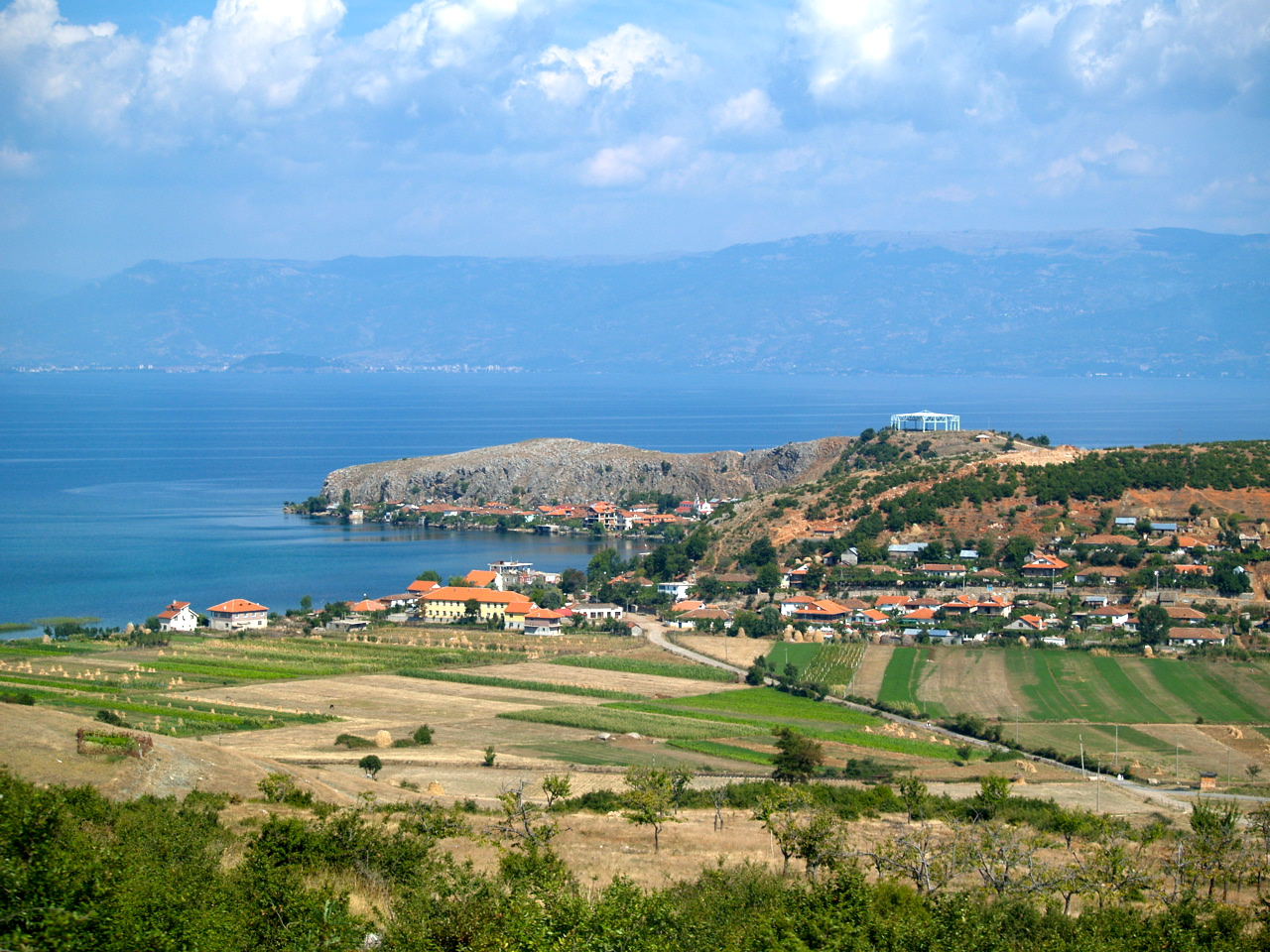

- Location within Albania
- Coordinates: 41°3′58″N 20°38′19″E
- Country: Albania
- County: Korçë
- Municipality: Pogradec
- Administrative unit: Udënisht
- Time zone: UTC+1 (CET)
  - Summer (DST): UTC+2 (CEST)

Lin (Albanian definite form: Lini) is a village in the municipality of Pogradec, in Korçë County, Albania. At the 2015 local government reform it became part of the municipality Pogradec.

== Geography ==
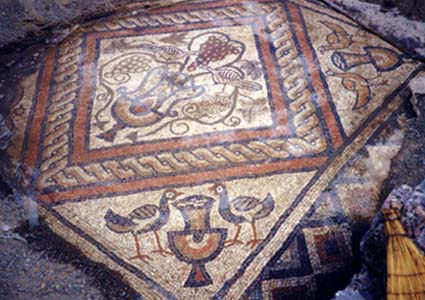
Late Antique mosaics found in Lin

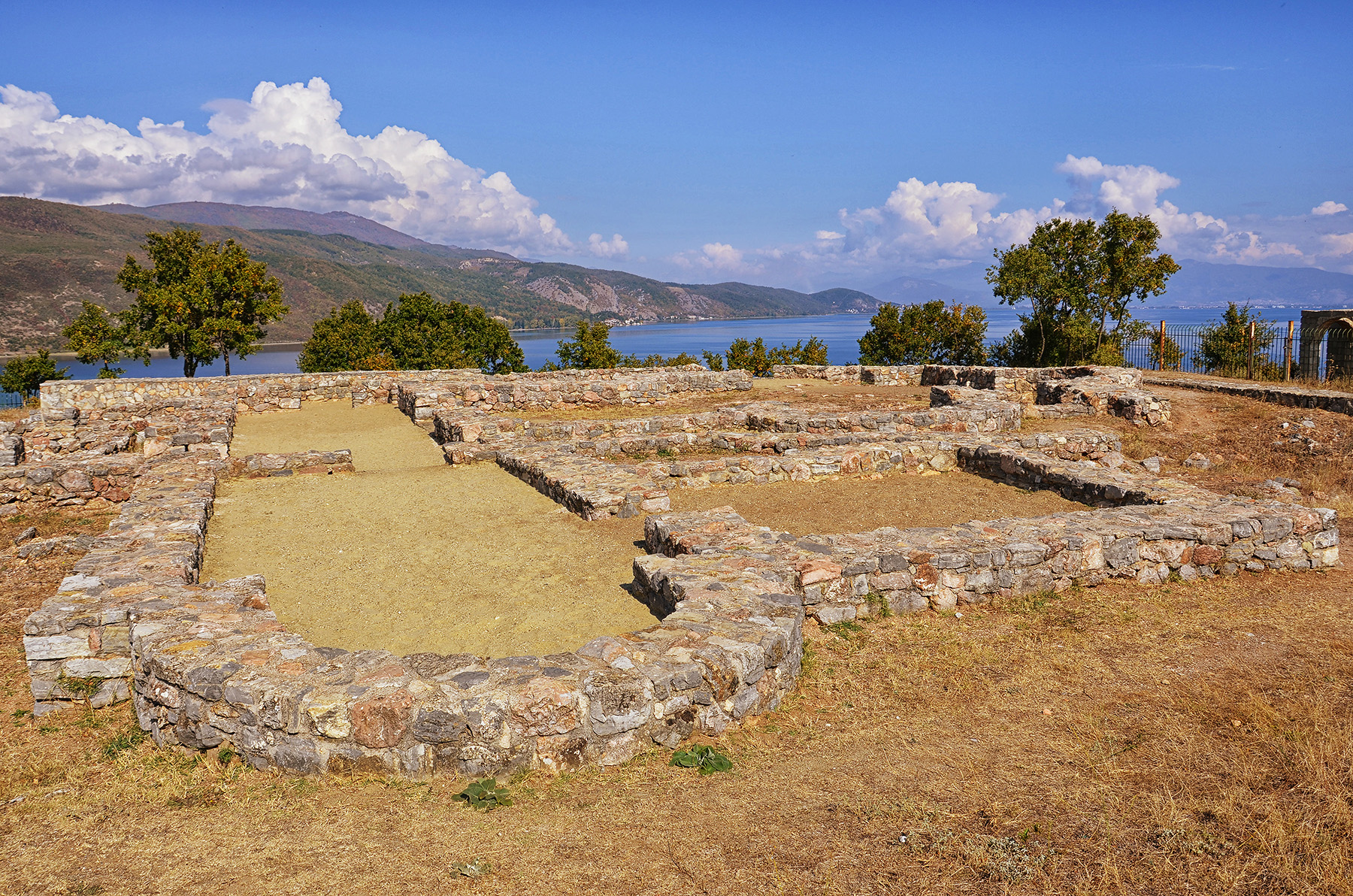
Remains of the Basilica

Lin is situated on a small peninsula on Lake Ohrid, just south of the Qafë Thanë mountain pass, which is a border-crossing point between Albania and North Macedonia. Pogradec is roughly 22 km to the south of the village, while Struga is about 10 km north, along the lake shore. Radožda is the nearest settlement on the opposite side of the border.

== History ==
The Lin area has been inhabited since at least Prehistory. New archeological findings indicate Lin to date back to being 8500 years old, meaning as old as at least 6000 BC. This makes Lin the oldest inhabited pile dwelling settlement in Europe. Archaeological findings from the hilltop above the present-day village include foundation walls and mosaics of an early Christian Byzantine church, dating from the 6th century. The church is a Cultural Monument of Albania and is included within the possible UNESCO site of the Natural and Cultural Heritage of the Ohrid Region (Albania).

In 1873, the village was recorded as having 65 households with 90 male Bulgarian Orthodox Christians and 62 male Muslims. In 1900, Vasil Kanchov traveled throughout the region, and he would report that Lin was a mixed village split equally between 300 Bulgarian Christians and 300 Albanian Muslims.

According to the Treaty of London (1913), Lin was supposed to become part of the Kingdom of Serbia. However, on 9 November 1921, the Conference of Ambassadors assigned Lin to Albania.

== Demographics ==
The Albanian Tosk dialect is spoken in the area. Lin is the only place in Albania where the Vevčani-Radožda dialect of Macedonian is spoken by Macedonians, who call the city Лин.

During the 2000s linguists Klaus Steinke and Xhelal Ylli seeking to corroborate villages cited in past literature as being Slavic speaking carried out fieldwork. Lin was noted as being a mixed village of Orthodox Christians and Muslims having 1680 inhabitants and 296 families. Local Lin villagers stated that few families still speak Macedonian, such as in instances of marriage with women from neighbouring Radožda in North Macedonia, however, Macedonian overall is not used by the third generation.

== Photos ==
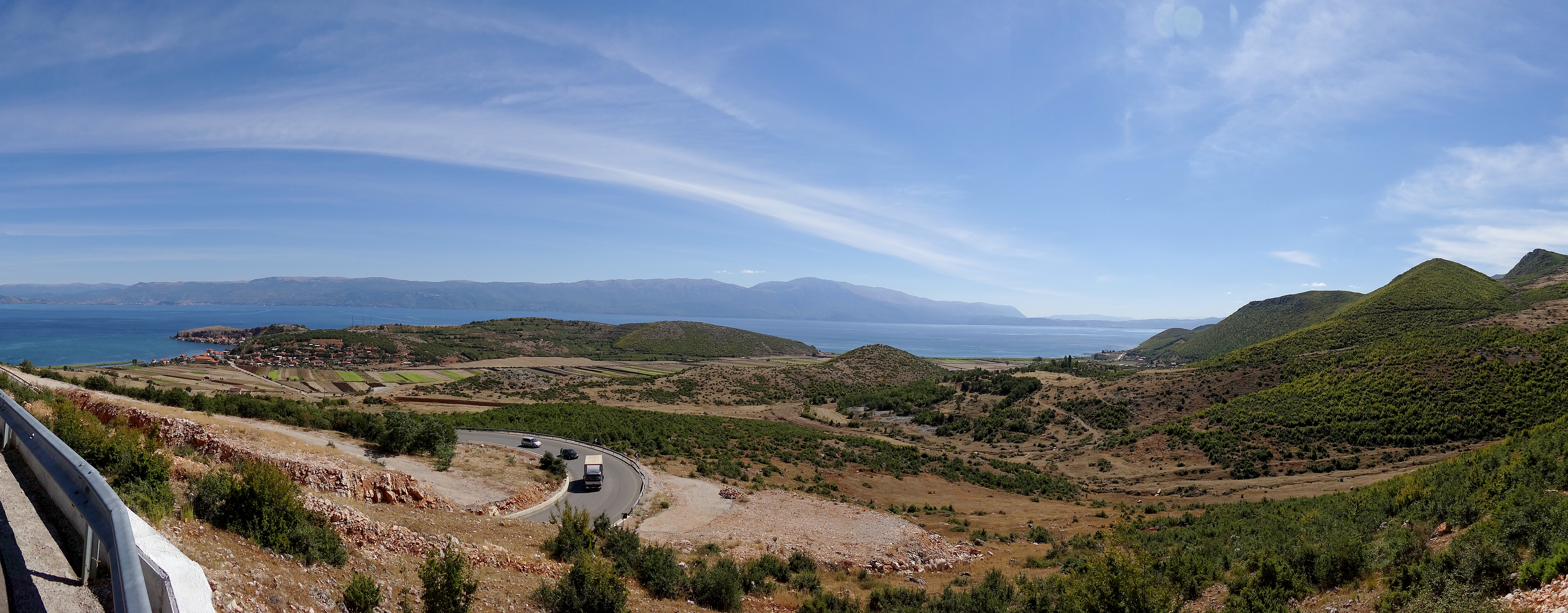
Panoramic View over the Ohrid Lake and Lin
