= Pogradec Castle =

Castle in Albania

- Kalaja e Pogradecit
- Pogradec, in Southeastern Albania
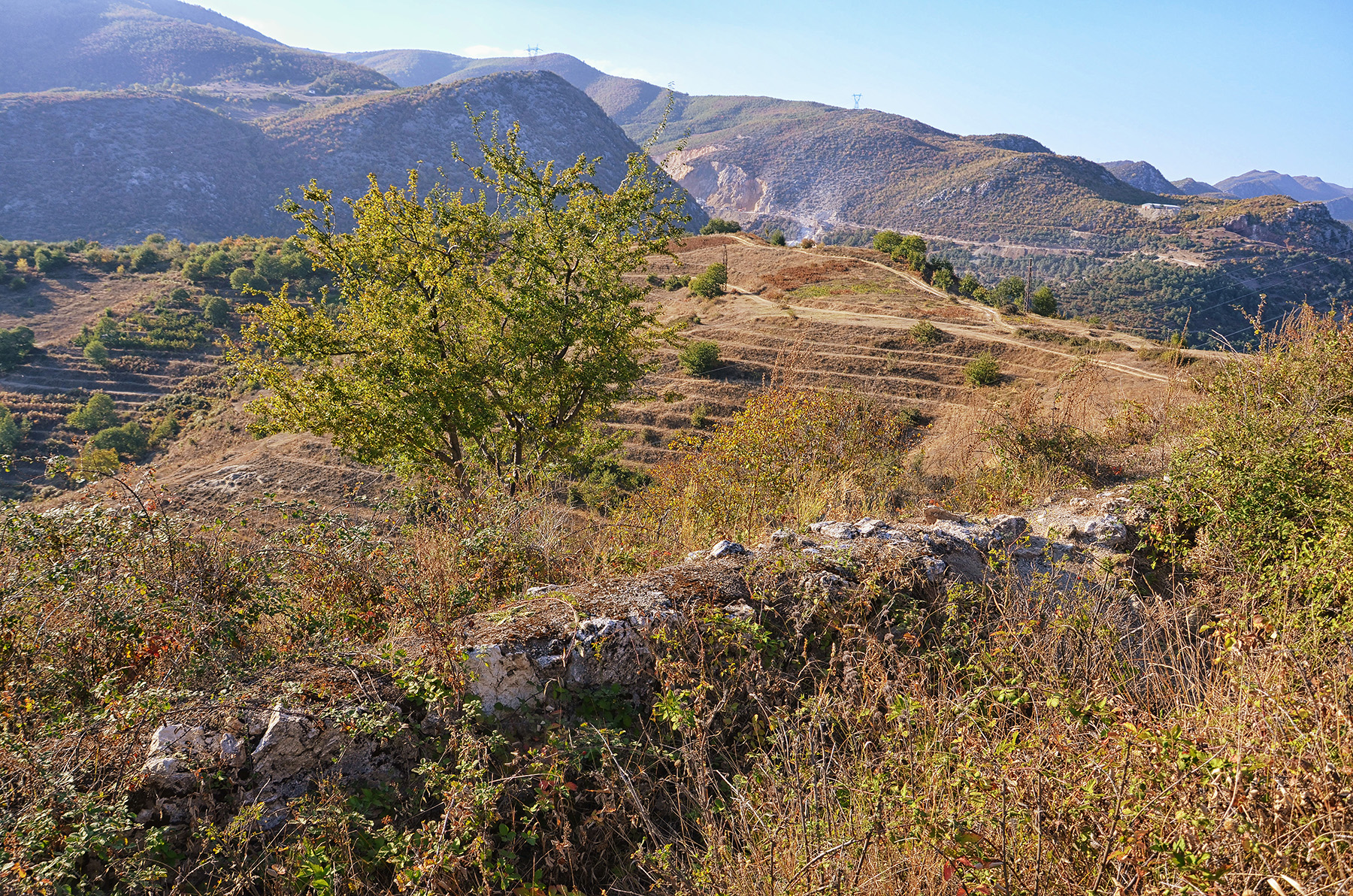
- Wall Ruins of Pogradec Castle.

Site information
- Owner: Albania
- Controlled by: Illyrian tribes Roman Empire; Byzantine Empire; Principality of Arbanon; Principality of Gropa; League of Lezhë; Ottoman Empire; Albania
- Open to the public: Yes

Location
- Coordinates: 40.908056°N 20.646389°E

Site history
- Built: 5th century BC
- Materials: Ancient blocks

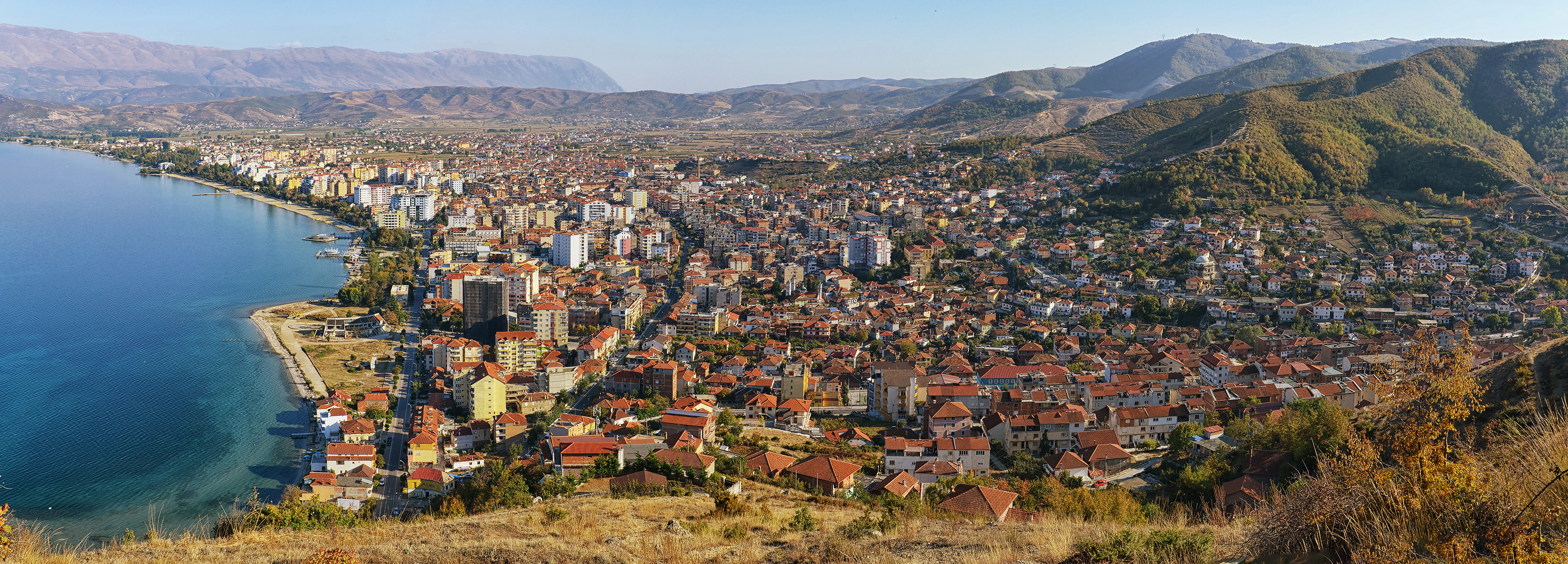
View of Pogradec from the castle.

Pogradec Castle (Albanian: Kalaja e Pogradecit) is a ruined castle in Pogradec, eastern Albania. At its highest point, it stands 205 metres (673 ft) above Lake Ohrid.

== History ==
The Pogradec Castle was built on an Illyrian settlement of the 5th century BC. A possible identificatioin with the ancient Enchelei has been proposed.

== Restoration ==
Ilir Xhakolli has announced to the public that there will be a Restoration project for the Castle. The project aims to carry out archaeological excavations to discover the buried parts of the castle and conserve the discoveries for locals and tourists to view. There will be a Panoramic Balcony and an Archaeological Museum in the area of the Castle. The European Union is financing the project while the Municipality will be paving the road.
