= St. Marina's Monastery =

17th-century monastery in Albania

St. Marena's Monastery
- Manastiri i Shën Marenës (Albanian)
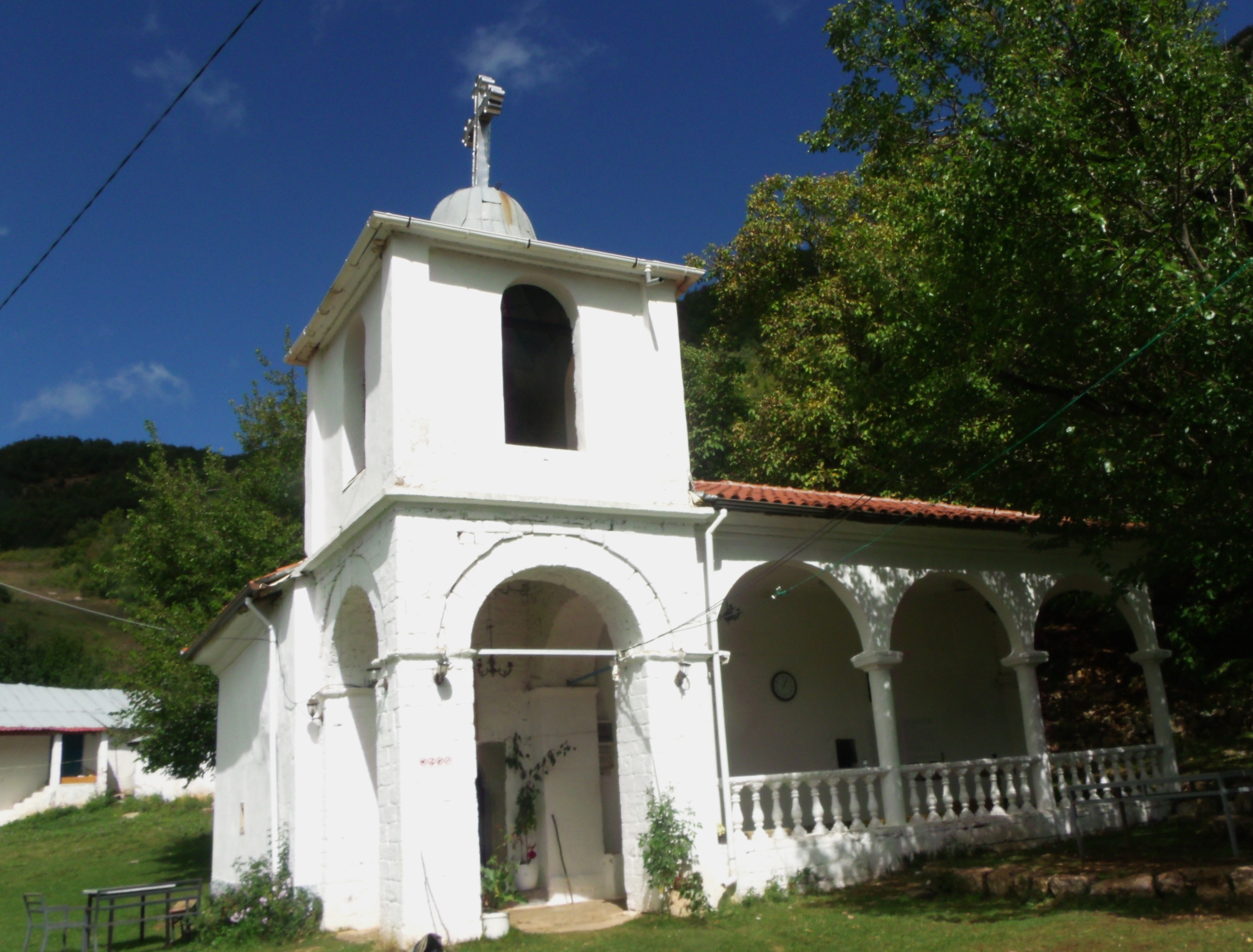
- The church of St. Marena within the Monastery
- Interactive map of St. Marena's Monastery
- 40.8966°N 20.4792°E
- Location: Llëngë

History
- Built: 14th century

Cultural Monument of Albania

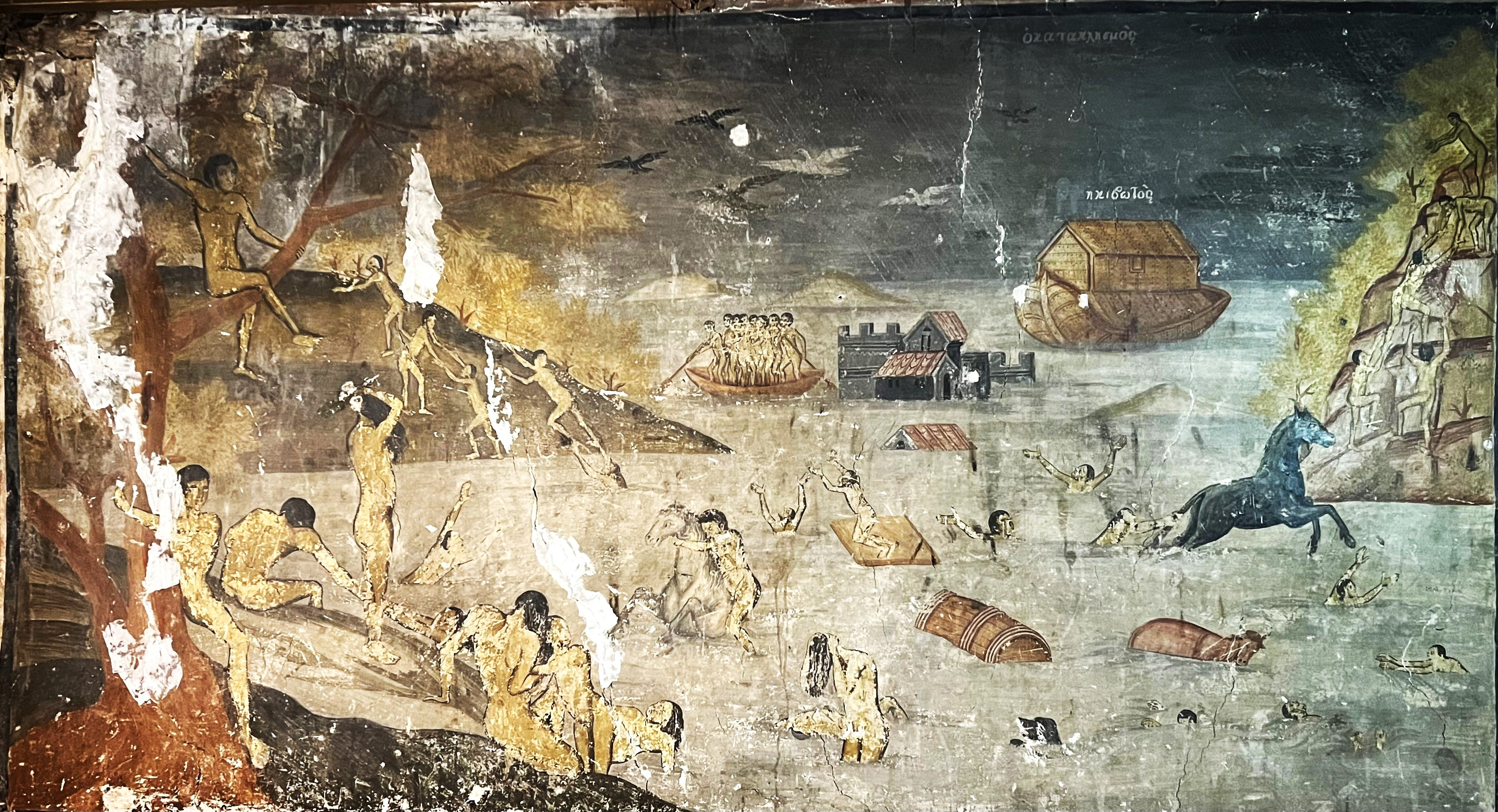
Fresco from the church painted by Konstadin Shpataraku

St. Marena's Monastery (Albanian: Manastiri i Shën Marenës) is an Albanian Orthodox monastery near Llëngë, Korçë County, Albania, dedicated to Marina the Monk and built in the 17th century. It is a Cultural Monument of Albania.

== Description ==
The church is a small building around 12 meters long. The altar is divided from the central nave by a wooden carved iconostas. All the interiors are frescoed by 18th century paintings of Kostandin Shpataraku.
