= Pogradec =

City in southeastern Albania

- Municipality
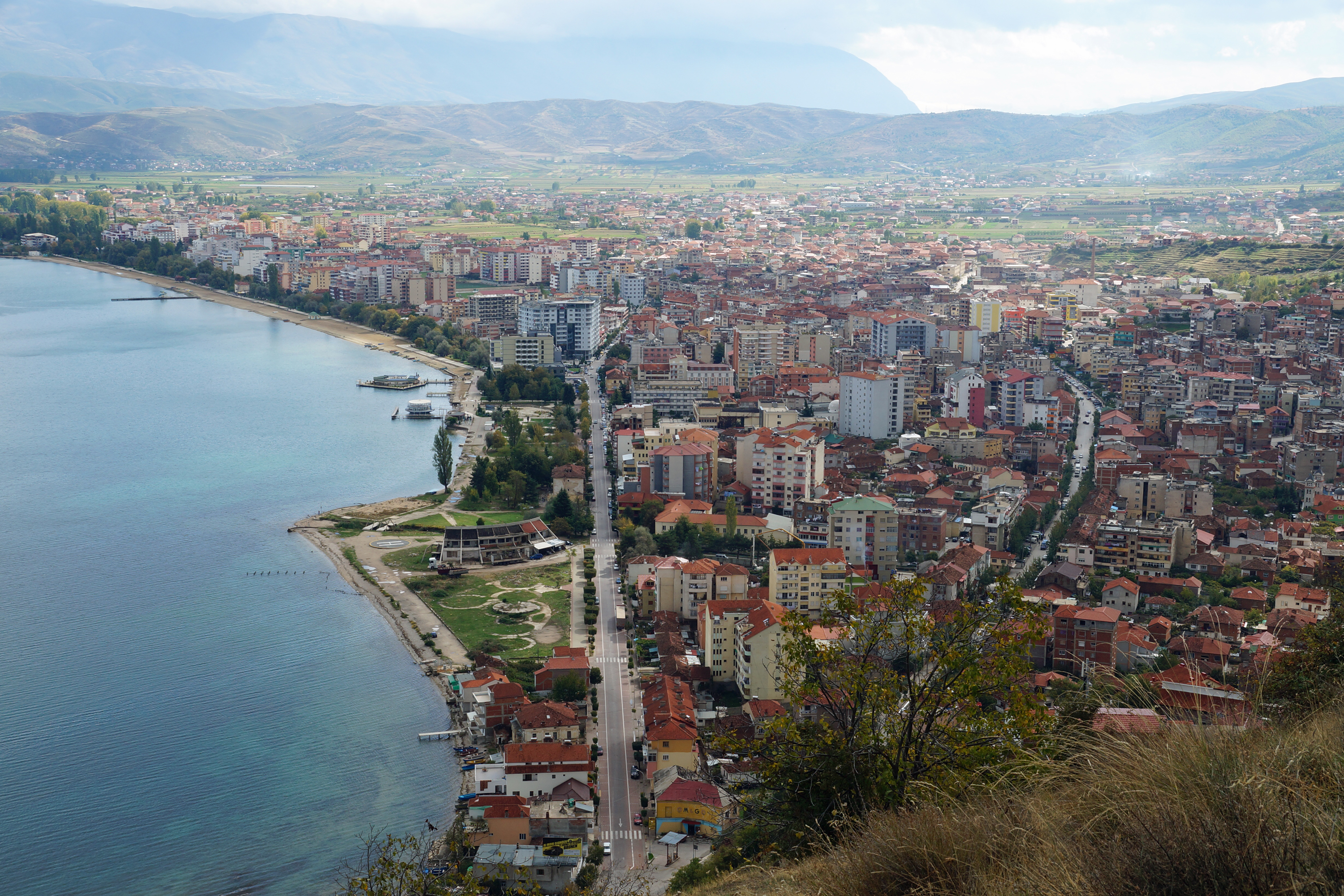
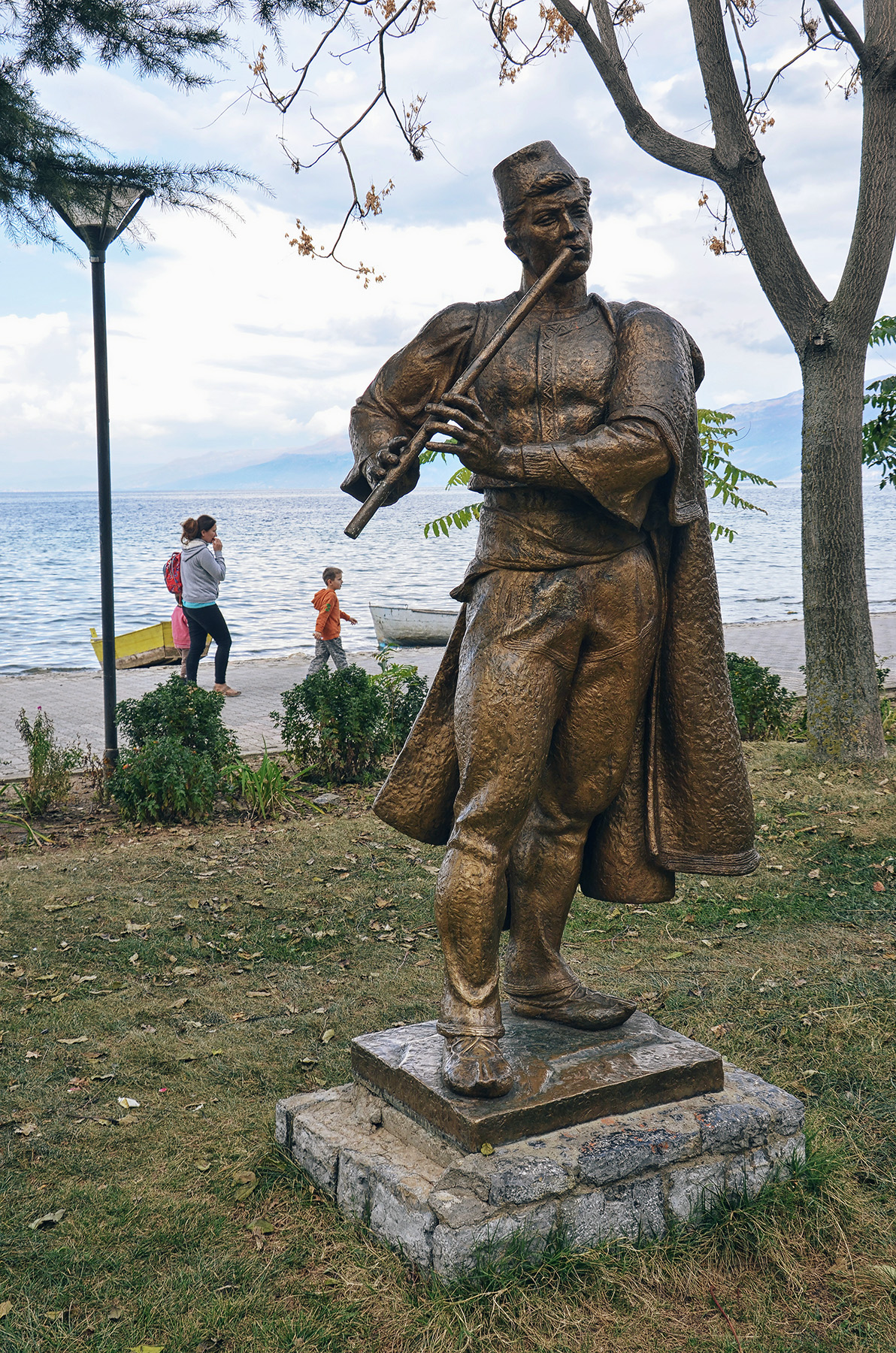
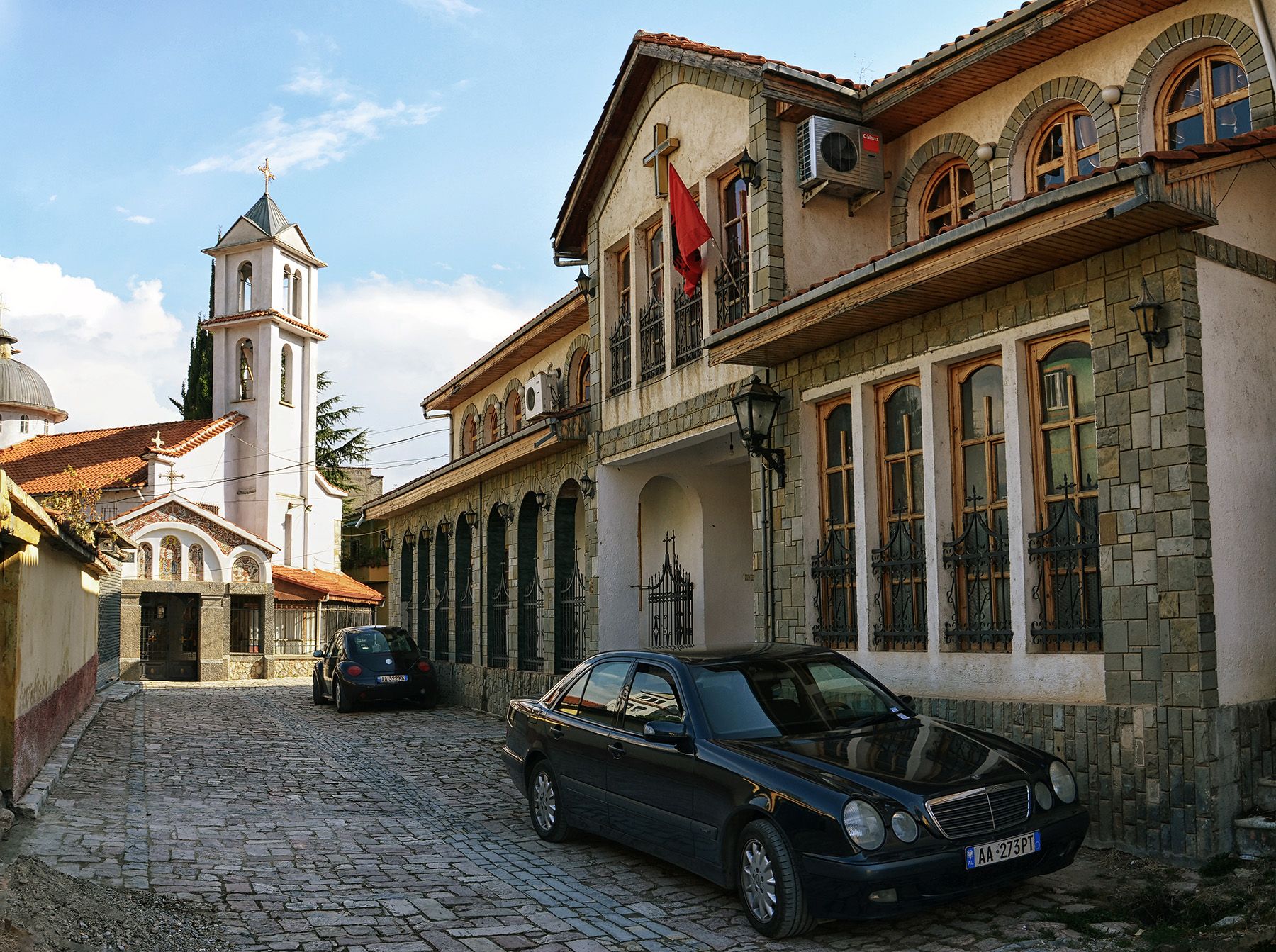
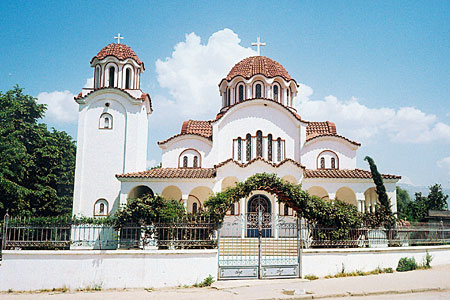
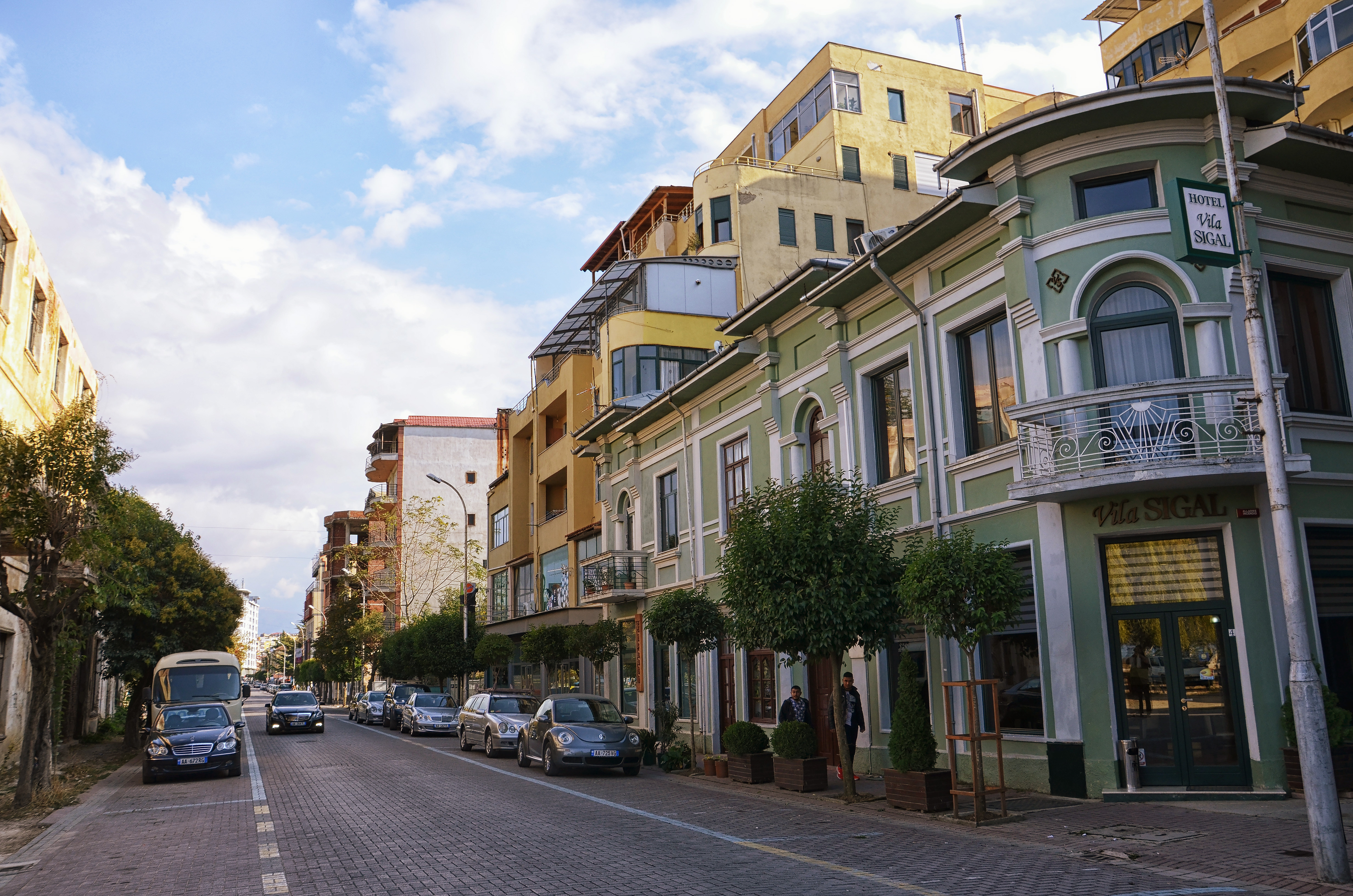
- Top to bottom, left to right: View of Pogradec from Pogradec Castle, Statue Playing Flute, Old town of Pogradec with St. Mary's Albanian Orthodox Church, Resurrection Orthodox Cathedral, Villa Sigal in Reshit Çollaku Street.

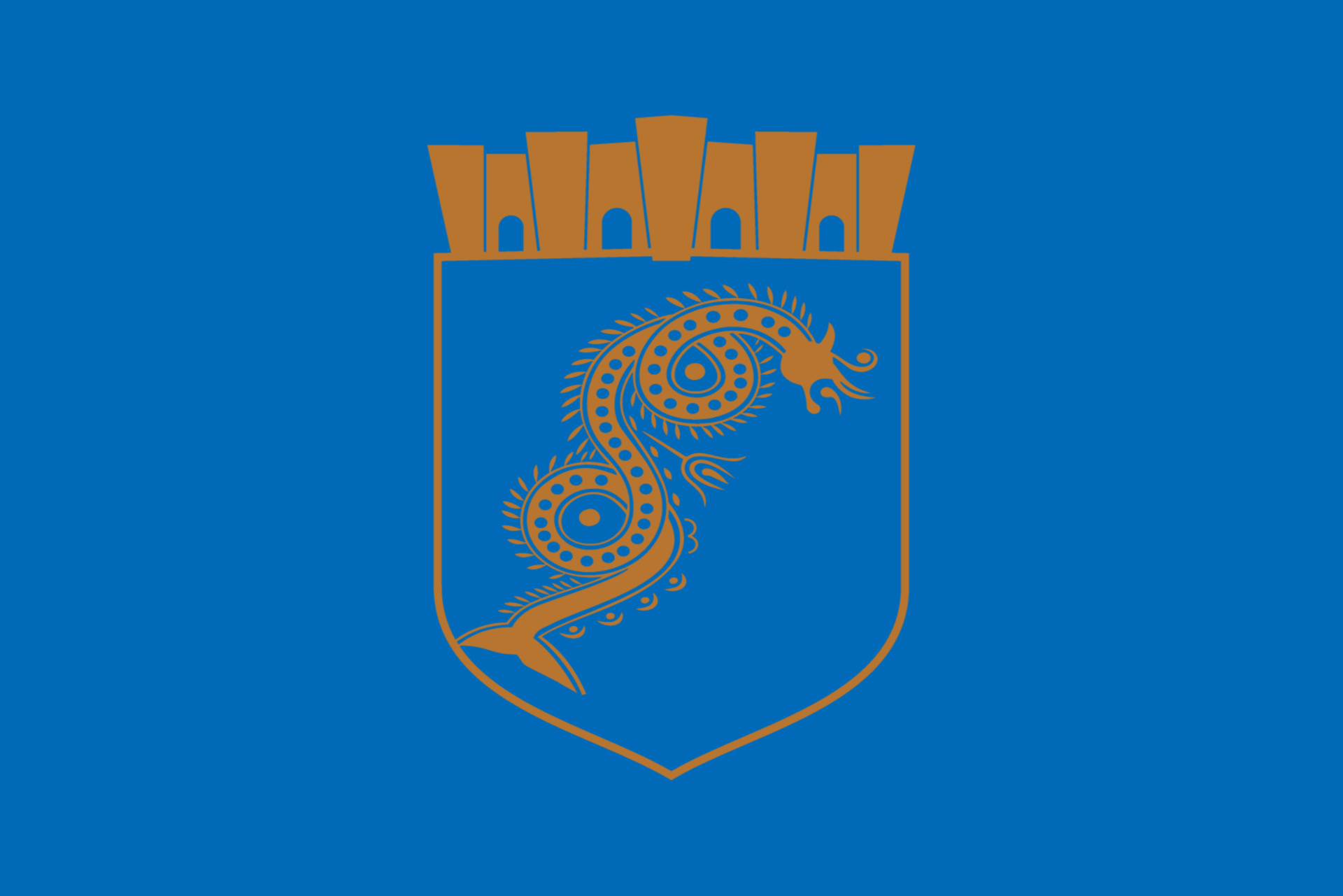
- Flag Emblem

- Location within Albania
- Coordinates: 40°54′N 20°39′E
- Country: Albania
- County: Korçë

Government
  - Mayor: Ilir Xhakolli (PS)

Area
  - Municipality: 584.77 km^{2} (225.78 sq mi)
  - Administrative unit: 3.47 km^{2} (1.34 sq mi)
- Elevation: 735 m (2,411 ft)

Population (2023)
  - Municipality: 46,070
  - Municipality density: 78.78/km^{2} (204.0/sq mi)
  - Administrative unit: 17,371
  - Administrative unit density: 5,010/km^{2} (13,000/sq mi)
- Demonym(s): Albanian: Pogradecar (m), Pogradecare (f)
- Time zone: UTC+1 (CET)
  - Summer (DST): UTC+2 (CEST)
- Postal Code: 7301–7303
- Area Code: (0)83
- Website: bashkiapogradec.gov.al

Pogradec (Albanian pronunciation: [pɔɡɾaˈdɛt͡s],) is the eleventh most populous city in Albania and the capital of the eponymous municipality. It is located on a narrow plain between two mountain chains along the southwestern banks of the Lake of Ohrid. Its climate is profoundly influenced by a seasonal Mediterranean and continental climate. The total municipal population is 46,070, of which 17,371 is in the municipal unit as of the 2023 census.

Historical population
Year	Pop.	±%
1950	4,275	—
1960	7,764	+81.6%
1969	9,800	+26.2%
1979	13,000	+32.7%
1989	19,272	+48.2%
2001	23,762	+23.3%
2011	20,848	−12.3%
2023	17,371	−16.7%

Pogradec and its surroundings were listed by UNESCO as a World Heritage Site as part of the natural and cultural heritage of the region of Ohrid. Nevertheless, the Illyrian Royal Tombs in the adjacent unit of Proptisht are on the Albanian tentative list for becoming a World Heritage Site.

== Etymology ==
The name of the town is Eastern South Slavic in origin. Pogradec comes from Po(d) (under/beneath) and Gradec (town, city, castle or fortified settlement) and means literally "under the city". This is a reference to the ancient Illyrian settlement, which was situated on a hill above the contemporary region of Pogradec. In the medieval period during the Ottoman rule, the town was known as İstarova or İstarye during Ottoman rule and was bounded to as kaza center in Görice Sanjak of Manastır Vilayet before Balkan Wars.

== History ==
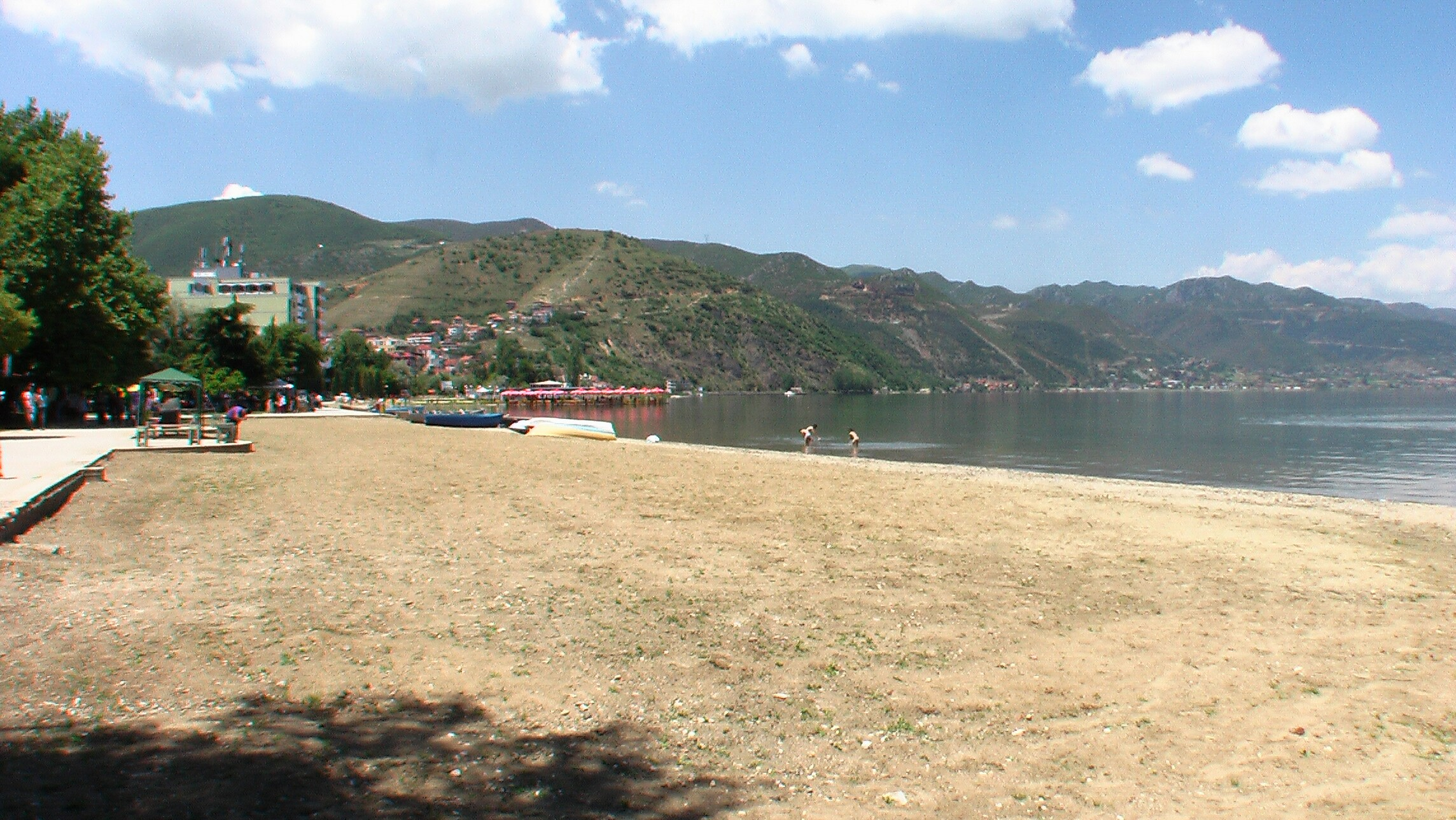
Beach of Pogradec

From the 8th until the 14th century, Pogradec area was captured by various medieval states such as the Bulgarian, Byzantine and Serbian Empires as well as by noble Albanian families such as Gropa. It was most likely during the Bulgarian empires rule in Pogradec is when it gained its modern name. In the middle of 15th century the area became part of the League of Lezhë and after Skanderbeg's death in 1468, it was invaded by the Ottomans who kept it until Albania's Independence in 1912. During their rule Pogradec was the center of the kaza of Starova and was developed as a small town of craftsmen and fishermen. When the Turkish traveler Evliya Celebi visited the area in 1662 he wrote that "Pogradec was a sweet city with red roofs, four neighborhoods, four mosques, two elementary schools, six hundred houses and one hundred and fifty shops".

During the second half of the 19th century and beginning of the 20th century, Pogradec area played an important role in the Albanian National Renaissance. On 14 March 1887 the second Albanian language school was started here.

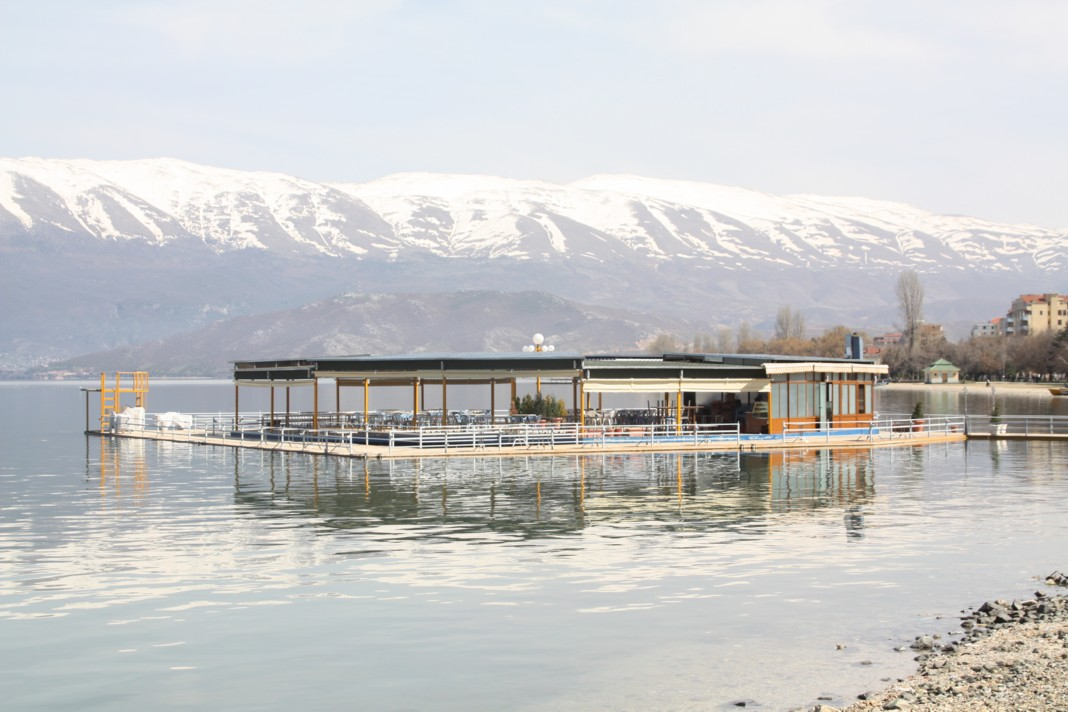
Pogradec along Lake Ohrid

During WWI Pogradec became a battlefield divided between the enemy fronts. From 1914 until 1920 Austro-Hungarian, Serbian, Greek, Bulgarian and French armies, captured the city replacing each-other from time to time.

During WWII the city was first invaded by the Italian army on 12 April 1939. Italian occupation of Pogradec was interrupted due to Greco-Italian War and Greek troops occupied the city between 30 November 1940 and 14 April 1941. After Italy's capitulation in 1943 it was liberated by the Albanian partisans.

After the war the town was a favorite summer escape for many communist government officials and particularly Enver Hoxha. The summer residences and the area around them were sealed off from the public.

== Geography ==
Pogradec is located at 40°54′N 20°39′E, on the shore of the southwestern corner of Lake Ohrid between two mountain chains located in the north and east. The mountain chain of Mali i Thatë in the Prespa National Park rises in the east of the city and divides the region from Lake Prespa. Defined in an area of 584.77 km² (226 sq mi), the municipality of Pogradec is encompassed in the county of Korçë within the Southern Region of Albania and consists of the adjacent administrative units of Buçimas, Çërravë, Dardhas, Proptisht, Trebinjë, Udenisht, Velçan and Pogradec as its seat.

=== Topography and landscape ===
The municipality encompasses a varied landscape consisting of lakeside plains, hills, mountain slopes and highland areas. The Pogradec Basin extends along the southwestern shore of Lake Ohrid and is bordered by surrounding mountainous terrain. The eastern part of the municipality includes sections of the Mokra highlands, while the mountain range of Mali i Thatë forms a prominent geographical boundary between the Lake Ohrid and Lake Prespa regions.

The protected landscape surrounding Lake Ohrid extends from approximately 695 m to 2,288 m above sea level and includes the Pogradec Basin, the Çërravë threshold, Mali i Thatë and the eastern part of the Mokra highlands. The differences in elevation contribute to the area's varied natural landscapes and ecosystems.<ref>National Agency of Protected Areas – Protected Landscape of Lake Pogradec</ref>

=== Lake Ohrid and hydrography ===
Lake Ohrid is the principal geographical feature of Pogradec and forms part of the natural border between Albania and North Macedonia. The lake has a surface area of approximately 358.2 km², of which approximately 109 km² lies within Albanian territory. Its surface is situated approximately 695 m above sea level, and it reaches a maximum depth of approximately 289 m. The lake has a maximum length of approximately 30 km and a width varying between 11.2 and 14.5 km.

Several rivers, streams and natural springs supply water to Lake Ohrid along the Albanian shoreline. Important watercourses include the Pogradec River, Verdova River and Çerava River, while the springs around Tushemisht and Drilon provide significant groundwater inflows. The Drilon springs are located east of Pogradec and form a network of watercourses that flow into the lake.

Lake Ohrid is also hydrologically connected to Lake Prespa through underground karst formations beneath the surrounding mountains. Water from the higher Prespa basin passes through underground channels and springs before entering Lake Ohrid, including through the spring systems near Tushemisht and Drilon.<ref>UNESCO – Natural and Cultural Heritage of the Ohrid Region</ref><ref>UNESCO – Hydrology of Lake Ohrid</ref>

=== Mountains and surrounding highlands ===
The municipality's landscape is strongly influenced by several mountain and highland areas. Mali i Thatë is one of the most prominent mountain ranges, extending along the eastern side of the Pogradec region and separating the Lake Ohrid basin from the Prespa basin. The Mokra highlands occupy much of the mountainous interior of the municipality and include numerous villages and rural settlements.

The mountainous areas contain forests, pastures, valleys and rocky terrain. Guri i Kamjes, a distinctive natural rock formation in the Mokra region, is among the notable geological features of the municipality.

=== Natural environment and protected areas ===
The municipality contains important natural habitats associated with Lake Ohrid, its surrounding wetlands, springs, rivers, forests and mountains. The Pogradec Protected Landscape was established in 1999 and covers approximately 31,410.64 hectares. It includes Lake Ohrid, the Pogradec Basin, Mali i Thatë and parts of the Mokra highlands.

The Albanian portion of Lake Ohrid was incorporated into the UNESCO World Heritage property known as the Natural and Cultural Heritage of the Ohrid Region in 2019. The protected area is recognized for its geological history, endemic freshwater species and ecological importance.

The region contains a variety of aquatic and terrestrial habitats, supporting numerous species of fish, birds, plants and other wildlife. Conservation efforts focus on maintaining water quality, protecting natural habitats and managing the environmental effects of tourism, construction, agriculture and fishing.<ref>UNESCO World Heritage Centre</ref><ref>National Agency of Protected Areas</ref>

=== Climate ===
The climate of the Lake Ohrid is classified as a local-continental type because of a microclimate that is created in that area influenced by Mediterranean climate. The average annual rainfall in the Lake basin amount to approximately 730 mm.

Climate data for Pogradec
Month	Jan	Feb	Mar	Apr	May	Jun	Jul	Aug	Sep	Oct	Nov	Dec	Year
Mean daily maximum °C (°F)	3 (37)	8 (46)	13 (55)	17 (63)	22 (72)	27 (81)	30 (86)	30 (86)	25 (77)	19 (66)	12 (54)	5 (41)	18 (64)
Mean daily minimum °C (°F)	−5 (23)	−3 (27)	1 (34)	5 (41)	9 (48)	12 (54)	14 (57)	14 (57)	10 (50)	7 (45)	2 (36)	−2 (28)	5 (42)
Average precipitation mm (inches)	40.5 (1.59)	38 (1.5)	34.9 (1.37)	53.1 (2.09)	48.4 (1.91)	29.2 (1.15)	30.8 (1.21)	29.2 (1.15)	38.7 (1.52)	53.4 (2.10)	65.6 (2.58)	73.5 (2.89)	535.3 (21.06)
Average precipitation days (≥ 1 mm)	8	8	8	12	10	7	6	4	7	9	11	13	103
Source: World Weather Online

== Economy ==
Pogradec is located about 139 km from Tirana, the capital city of Albania, 40 km from Korça, and 5 km from North Macedonia. Pogradec is the last railway station: Tirana - Durrës - Elbasan - Librazhd - Pogradec and located along SH3 road that passes through Devoll and continues to Greece. However, the train service now finishes at Elbasan, and parts of the line from there on are derelict. There are some proposals to revive the line and extend it to connect to the Greek railway network. Translake transport started on 15 June 2014 with a tourist ferry between Pogradec and Ohrid, but the service is sporadic and unreliable.

== Culture ==
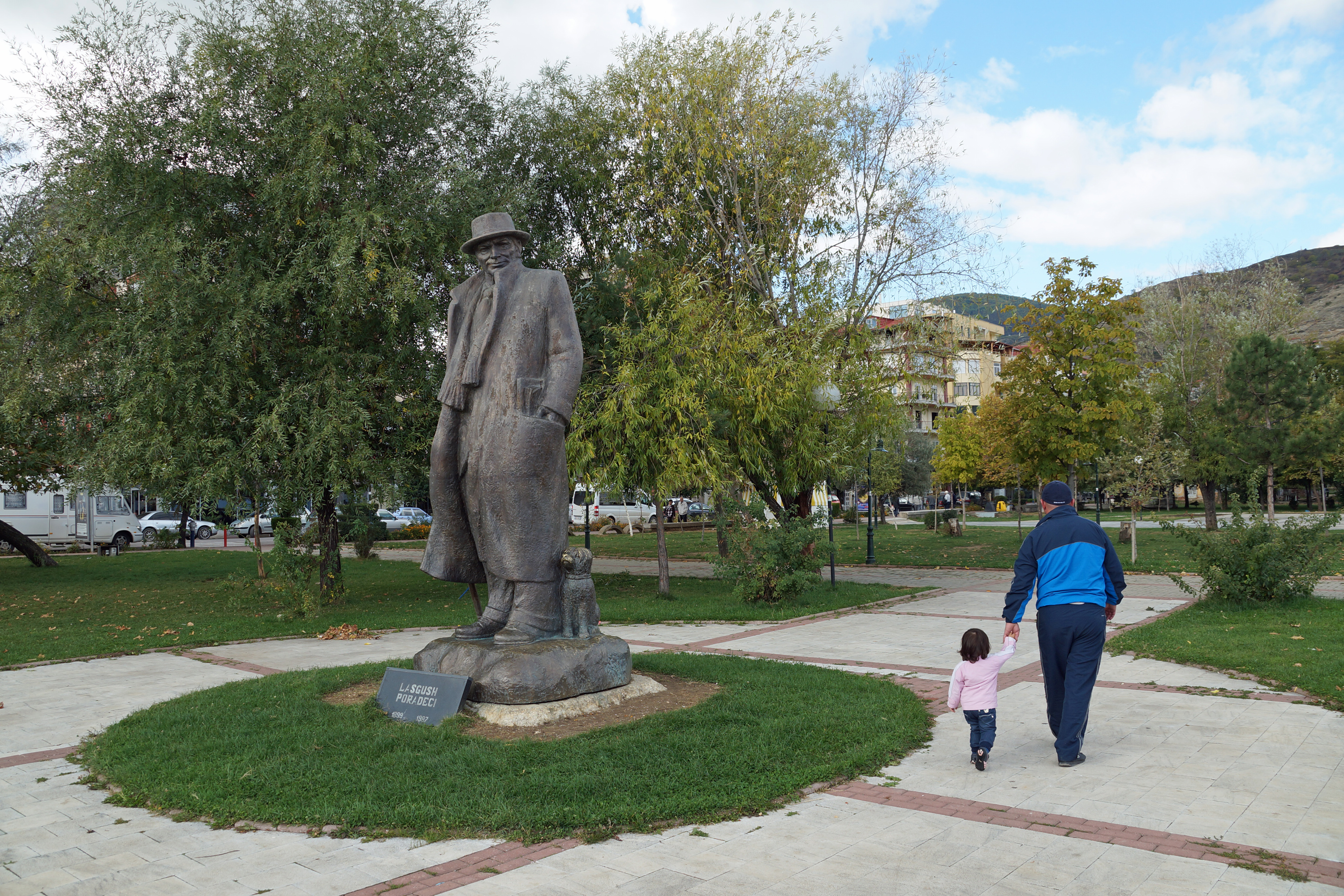
Writer Lasgush Poradeci's Statue in Pogradec

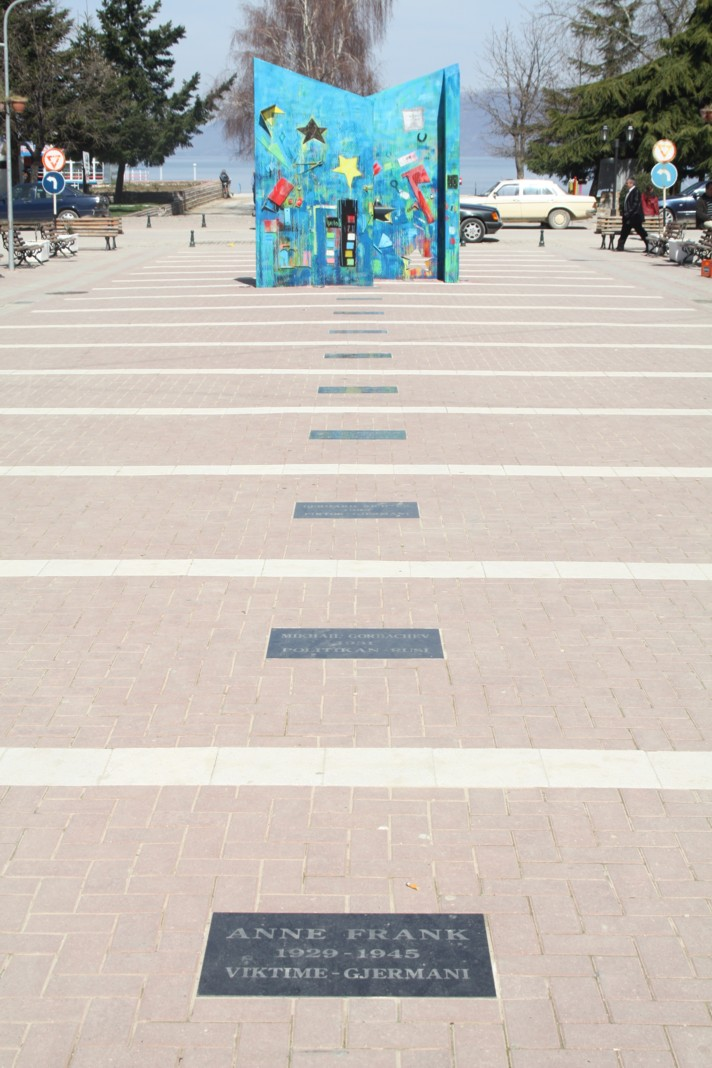
The main street of Pogradec

Pogradec is well known for its famous writers and poets such as Lasgush Poradeci and Mitrush Kuteli, and lately Luan Starova. Their works are a crucial part of Albanian literature.

The main characters of Luan Starova's cycle of novels, "The Balkan Saga", are the author's own parents and their family, who fled Pogradec for Macedonia during World War II. Separated from their old hometown and their relatives by the Albania-Yugoslavia border during the Enver Hoxha's era, they would often look at Pogradec through a binocular from the vantage point of Monastery of Saint Naum on the other side of the lake.

Pogradec is also the home of nationally and internationally acclaimed artist painters like Anastas Kostandini(Taso), Gjergji Lako, Gentian Zeka, Vangjo Vasili, Odhisea Dhima, Ilir Dhima, etc. All kinds of sports are practiced in town, especially by the youth.

Pogradec has a professional football team called KS Pogradeci. There are several varsity soccer teams mainly composed of high school students. Even volleyball and basketball are played competitively. During the summer, beach volleyball draws the attention of all the residents. Many professional volleyball teams from Albania and other Balkan countries participate in a championship which lasts about two weeks. Pogradeci team has been awarded the first prize several times. Other sports to mention are swimming and boxing. The boxing team, "Dragoi", is one of the top teams in the nation and has always trained champions.

Pogradec also has a rich folklore. Many songs and dances have been created throughout the centuries. Their themes are based on the beauty of the lake and a love for nature.

Some of the main recurring cultural events in the city are:

"Puppet Theater Festival" - Takes place every June. Participants vary from national to European level.

"Lake Day" - Takes place in 21 June. All the towns surrounding lake Ohrid (Pogradec, Ohrid and Struga) gather in a festival where local delicacies, including food and culture are showcased.

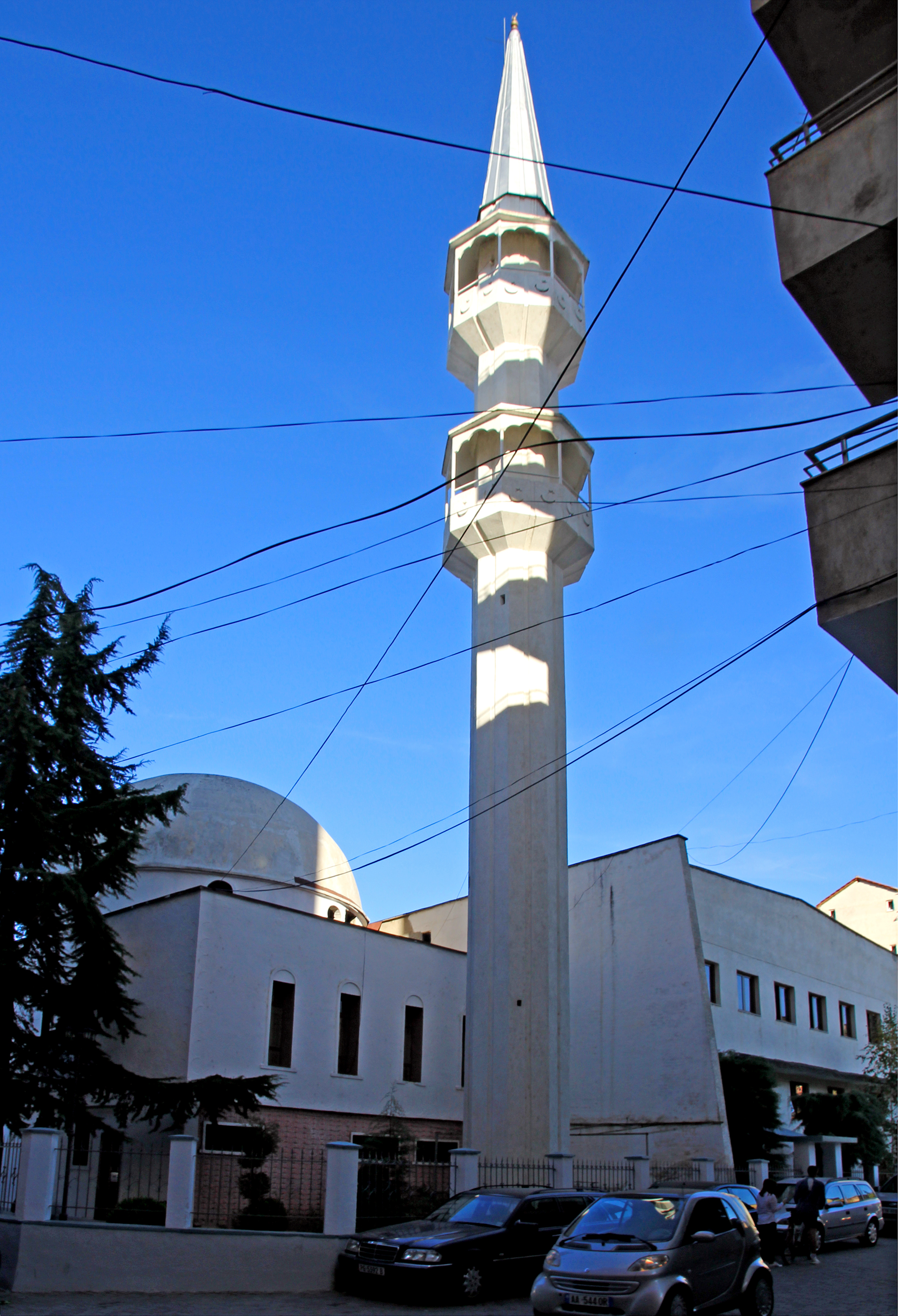
Mosque of Pogradec

"Balkan Film Food Festival" - Takes place in September. Balkan movies, documentaries and culinary are showcased throughout the days of the festival.

"Wine Fest" - Takes place in December. Pogradec families compete together for the best homemade wine in the city. The days of the festival are accompanied by great food and live music.

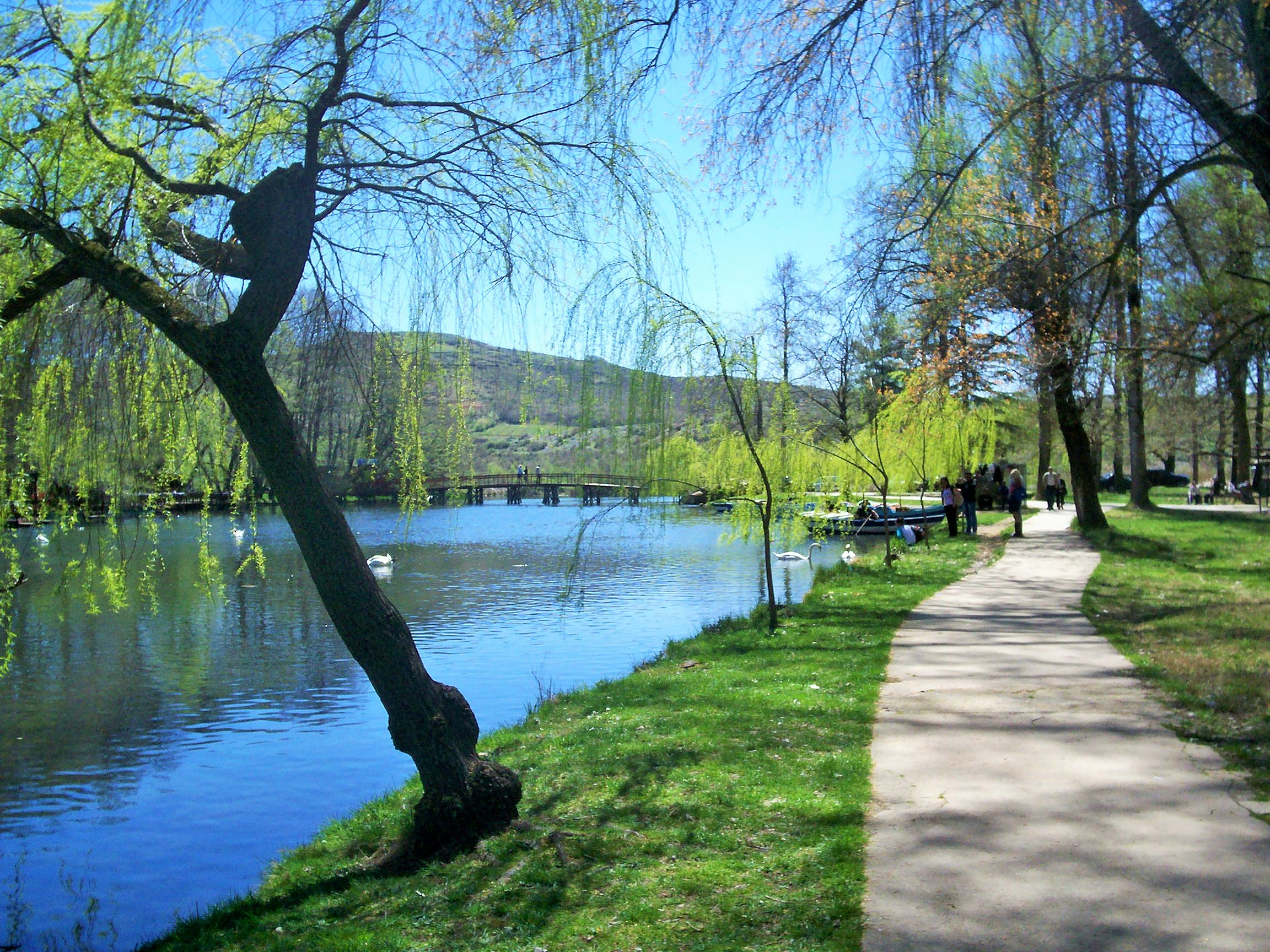
Drilon Park in Pogradec

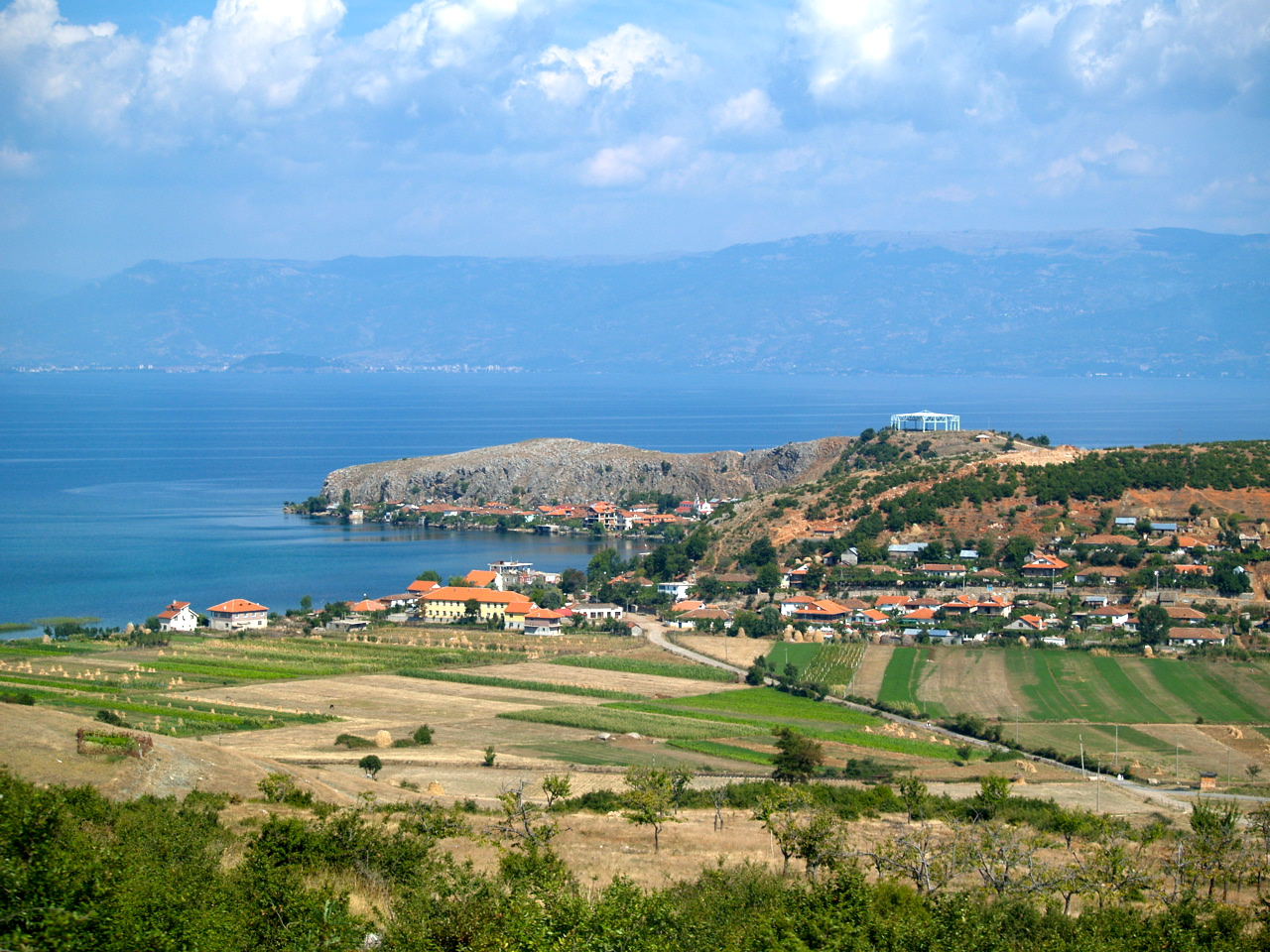
Lin village north of Pogradec

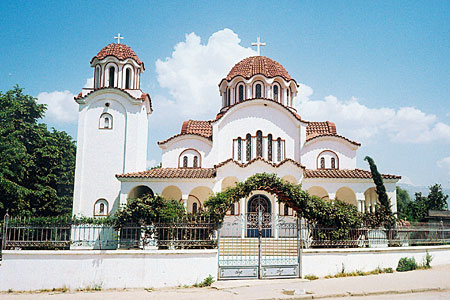
Orthodox Church

Pogradec area is very rich in cultural and natural monuments among which can be mentioned

- Pogradec Castle
- 19th and 20th century historical center of the city of Pogradec
- Illyrian Royal Tombs of Lower Selca Royal Tombs of Selca e Poshtme
- Castle of Blace village
- Castle of Zemçë village
- Fortifications in the village of Slabinjë
- Prehistoric settlement of Zagradie in the village of Lin
- Bridge near the villages Jollë and Llëngë
- Bridge near the village of Golik
- Bridge near the village of Niçë
- Bridge near the village of Çezmë
- Bridge in the village of Zgallë
- Bridge in the village of Servatinë
- Terziu Bridge in the village of Proptisht
- Fortification in the village of Shpellë in Mokra
- St. Marina's Monastery in the village of Llëngë
- Paleo-Christian church and mosaics in the village of Lin
- Byzantine church in the village of Lin
- Mosaic in the village of Tushemisht
- Drilon water sources and swans park near Tushemisht
- Guri i Kamjes in Mokra
- The karstic cave and small lake inside it above the village of Hudenisht

== Media ==
=== Newspapers ===
- Nositi, founded 1998

== Twin towns – sister cities ==
Pogradec is twinned with:

- Ohrid, North Macedonia
- Wismar, Germany
