= Tushemisht =

- Village
- Location within Albania
- Coordinates: 40°54′1″N 20°43′9″E
- Country: Albania
- County: Korçë
- Municipality: Pogradec
- Administrative unit: Buçimas
- Elevation: 841 m (2,759 ft)
- Time zone: UTC+1 (CET)
  - Summer (DST): UTC+2 (CEST)

Tushemisht is a village in the Korçë County, in southeastern Albania, located on the shores of Lake Ohrid. It was part of the former Buçimas municipality. At the 2015 local government reform it became part of the municipality Pogradec. The village is very close to the border with Republic of North Macedonia. It sits at an elevation of 841m. Before the 2015 government reform the village was included in the Buçimas municipality.

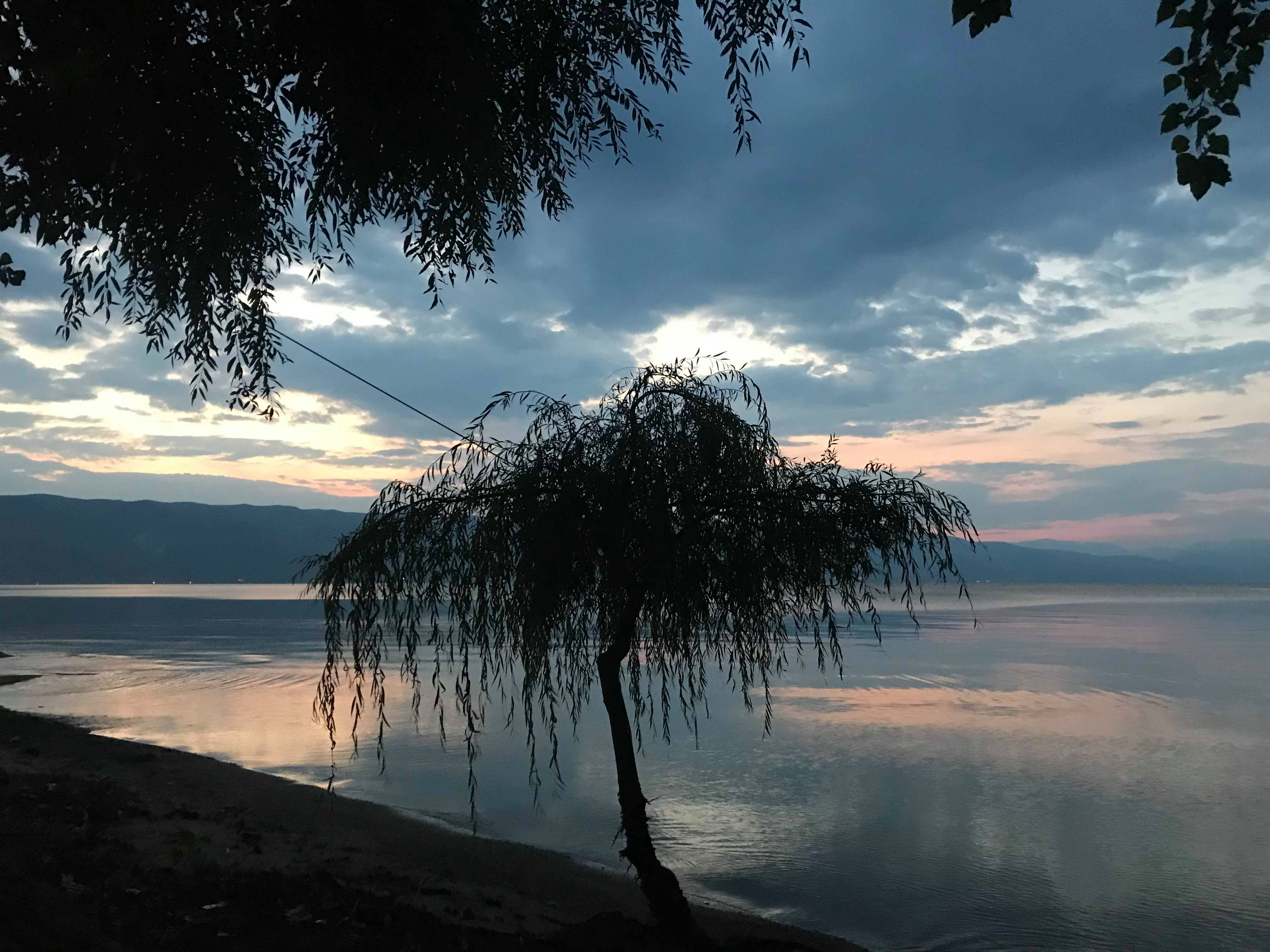
Near Tushemisht

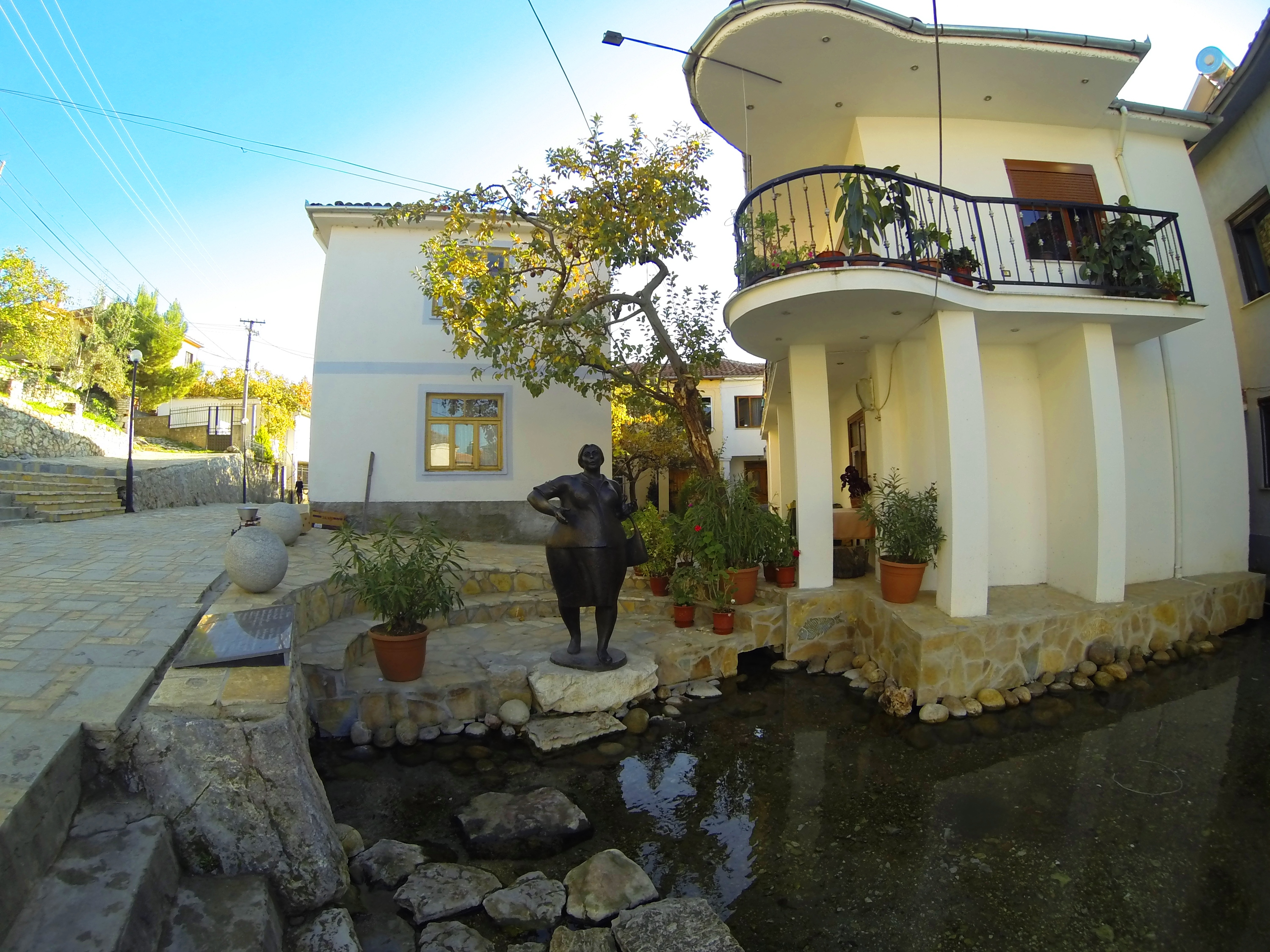
Zonja nga Qyteti

The village is known for being the primary location of the Albanian romantic comedy film Zonja nga qyteti (The lady from the city).

== Notable people ==
- Gjergj Pekmezi - An Albanian linguist
