= Nositi =

Newspaper in Albania

- Founded: 1998; 27 years ago
- Language: Albanian
- Headquarters: Pogradec

Nositi is a local newspaper published in Albania. The paper was started in 1998 and has its headquarters in Pogradec.
