= Frangovo =

Frangovo Франгово Frëngovë
- Village
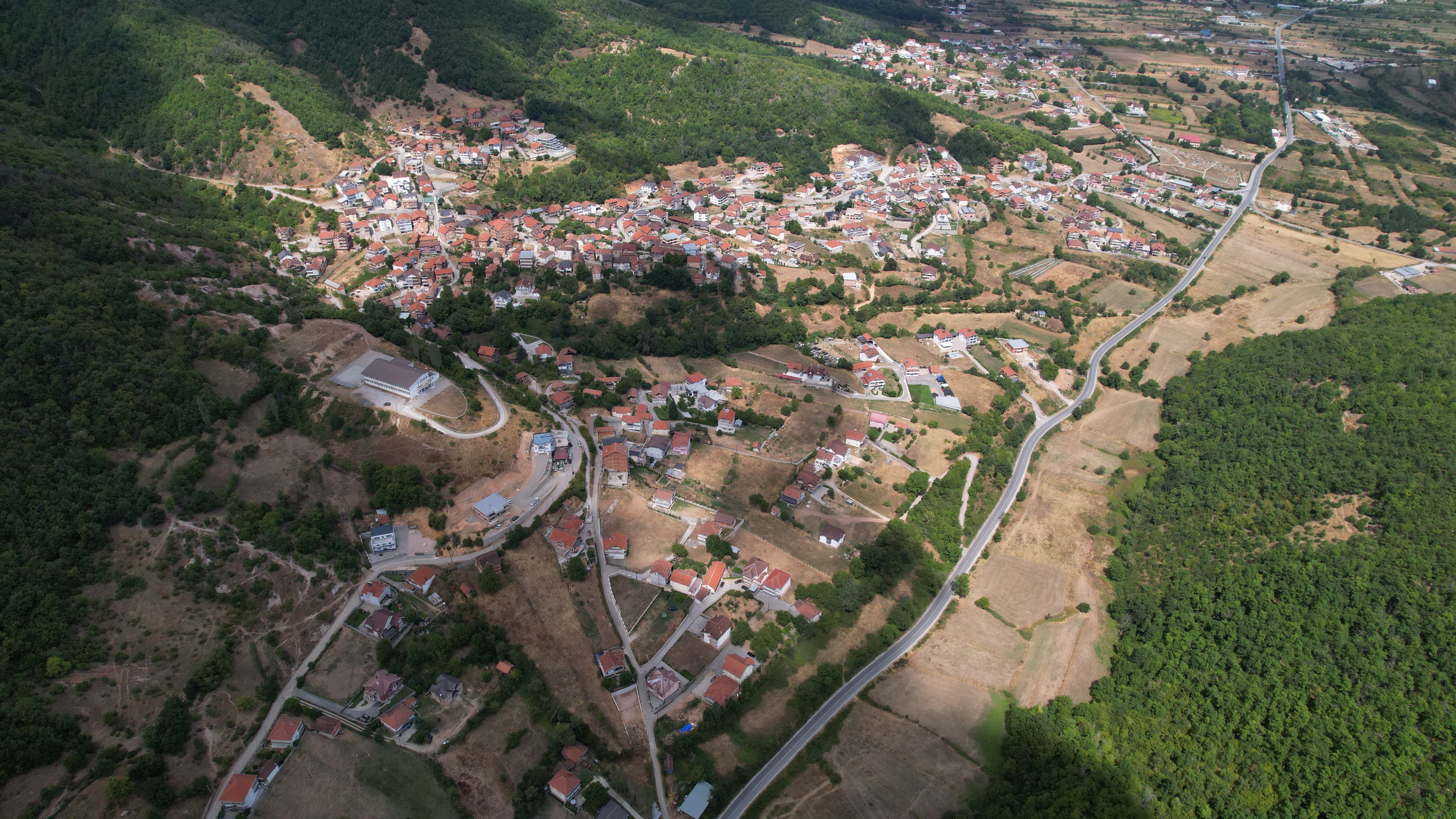
- Air view of the village

- Location within North Macedonia
- Coordinates: 41°08′43″N 20°37′23″E
- Country: North Macedonia
- Region: Southwestern
- Municipality: Struga

Area
  - Total: 9.4 km^{2} (3.6 sq mi)
- Elevation: 810 m (2,660 ft)

Population (2021)
  - Total: 1,206
  - Density: 130/km^{2} (330/sq mi)
- Time zone: UTC+1 (CET)
  - Summer (DST): UTC+2 (CEST)
- Area code: +38946
- Car plates: SU

Frangovo (Macedonian: Франгово; Albanian: Frëngovë) is a village in the municipality of Struga, North Macedonia. In the 2021 census, it had a population of 1,206, of which the majority were Albanians.

== Name ==
All forms of the toponym are derived from the form Frangovo, by reduction of the original sound cluster an into ân/ën or the denasalisation of the latter (Frangovo, Frngovo, Frgovo). The form Фрургови Власи/Frugovi Vlasi has a Serbian denasalisation of the sound cluster an > o̧ > u of which the toponym was first recorded in a medieval document of Emperor Stefan Dušan, probably written by a Serb. This is a possessive name formed with a suffix that is derived from the ethnonym Frang/Frank meaning (Western) Europeans or someone not of the Balkans and is probably associated with the Crusades era.

== History ==
During the mid-fourteenth century, a document of Stefan Dušan refers to property of the Church of Sts. Clement and Panteleimon in Ohrid with the settlement recorded under the name Frugovi Vlasi, which later possibly broke up into two villages identified as being modern Frangovo and nearby Mali Vlaj.

Vasil Kanchov's 1900 survey recorded 360 Muslim Arnauts in Фъргово. In 1901, Фаргово was an Albanian village with 45 houses in the Ethnographic Map of the Bitola Vilayet.

== Geography ==
This large village with surface area of 9.4 square kilometers is situated in the southwestern part of Struga Municipality near the border of Albania. Its territory extends up to the ridge of Mount Jakupica. As a hilly village, it has an elevation of 810 meters.

== Demographics ==
=== Ethnicities ===
The village of Frangovo is inhabited by Tosks, a subgroup of southern Albanians and speak the Tosk Albanian dialect.

The historical ethnic makeup of this village is as follows:

Ethnicity	Year							
Ethnicity	1953	1961	1971	1981	1991	1994	2002	2021
Macedonians	37	1	3	4	0	0	0	—
Albanians	716	842	1,084	1,249	0	1,554	1,734	1,156
Turks	0	0	0	0	0	0	0	—
Roma	0	0	0	0	0	0	0	—
Aromanians	1	0	—	0	0	0	0	—
Serbs	4	1	0	0	0	0	0	—
Bosniaks	0	0	—	—	0	0	0	1
Others	0	0	1	1	0	0	5	13
Total	758	844	1,088	1,254	0	1,554	1,739	1,206

=== Sex distribution ===
The historical population of both sexes in this village is as follows:

Sex	Year							
Sex	1948	1953	1961	1971	1981	1991	1994	2002
Male	343	411	450	569	645	—	788	893
Female	309	347	394	519	609	—	766	846
