= Udënisht =

- Administrative unit
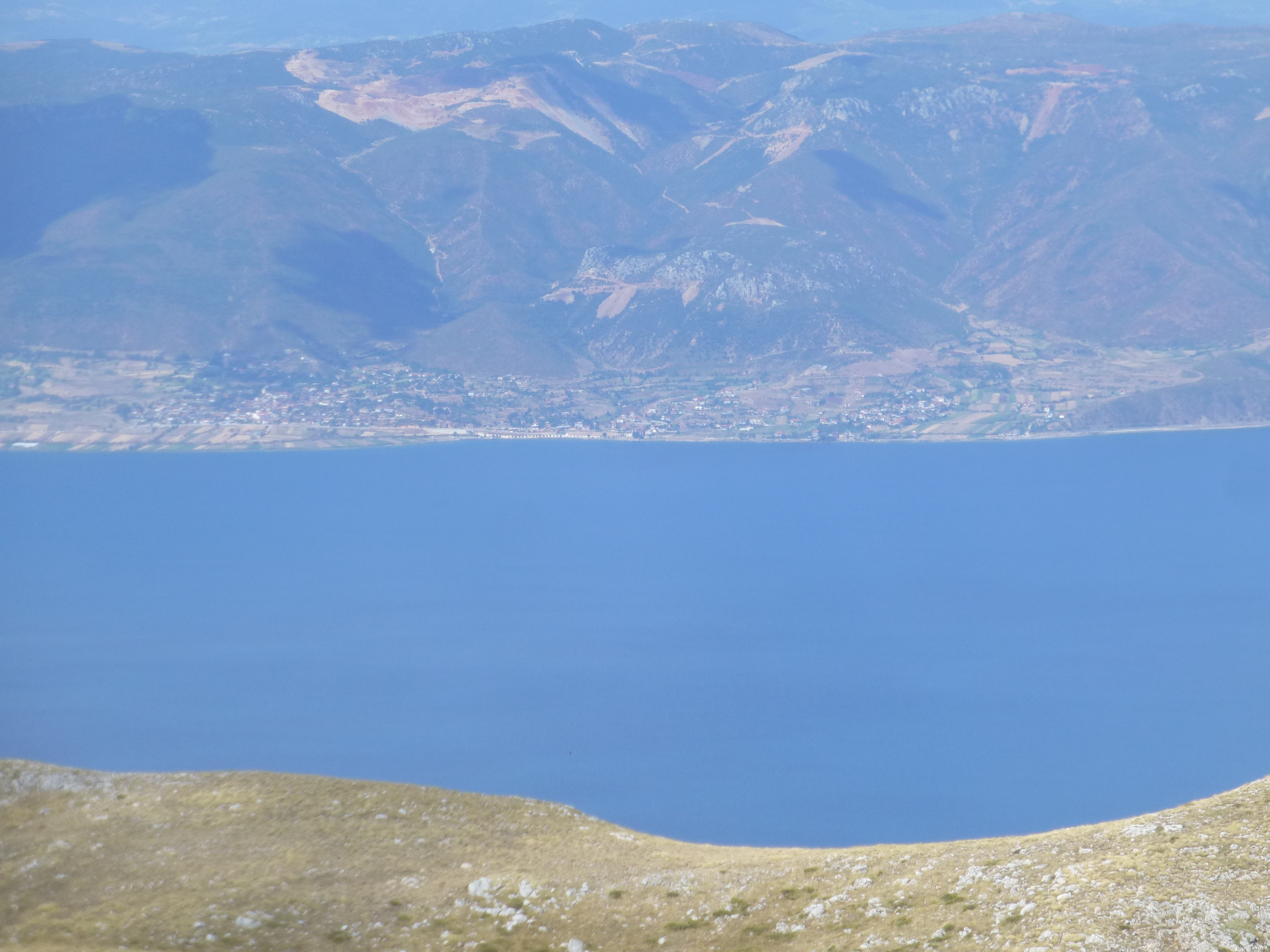
- The village seen from Galičica mountain on the other side of Lake Ohrid

- Location within Albania
- Coordinates: 40°58′N 20°38′E
- Country: Albania
- County: Korçë
- Municipality: Pogradec

Population (2011)
  - Administrative unit: 5,990
- Time zone: UTC+1 (CET)
  - Summer (DST): UTC+2 (CEST)
- Postal Code: 7305
- Area Code: (0)868

Udënisht (also: Hudënisht) (Macedonian: Уденци) is a village and a former municipality in the Korçë County, southeastern Albania. At the 2015 local government reform it became a subdivision of the municipality Pogradec. The population at the 2011 census was 5,990. The municipal unit consists of the villages Udënisht, Mëmëlisht, Çervenakë, Piskupat, Lin and Buqezë.
