= Çërravë =

- Administrative unit
- Location within Albania
- Coordinates: 40°51′N 20°44′E
- Country: Albania
- County: Korçë
- Municipality: Pogradec

Population (2011)
  - Total: 7,009
- Time zone: UTC+1 (CET)
  - Summer (DST): UTC+2 (CEST)
- Postal Code: 7306
- Area Code: (0)869

Çërravë is an administrative unit in the municipality of Pogradec, Korçë County, Albania. The village of Çërravë is the seat of the eponymous unit and consist of the adjacent villages of Alarup, Blacë, Bletas, Grabovicë, Kodras, Leshnicë, Lumas, Nizhavec, Pretushë and Qershizë.
