= Velçan =

- Administrative unit
- Location within Albania
- Coordinates: 40°57′N 20°28′E
- Country: Albania
- County: Korçë
- Municipality: Pogradec

Population (2011)
  - Administrative unit: 2,548
- Time zone: UTC+1 (CET)
  - Summer (DST): UTC+2 (CEST)
- Postal Code: 7310
- Area Code: (0)860

Velçan is a village and a former municipality in the Korçë County, southeastern Albania. At the 2015 local government reform it became a subdivision of the municipality Pogradec. The population at the 2011 census was 2,548. The municipal unit consists of the villages Velçan, Buzahishtë, Shpellë, Bishnicë, Jollë, Losnik, Laktesh and Senishtë.
