= Battle of Pogradec =

The Battle of Pogradec was a military engagement between Hellenic and Italian forces during the Greco-Italian War, with preliminary assaults on Italian forces beginning on 27 November 1940, however, the city of Pogradec itself was only attacked directly by Greek forces on 29 November, with units of the Greek Third Army Corps (Part of the Western Macedonia Army Section) launching their attack on 27, this attack was itself preceded by attacks in the general area beginning on 25, sometimes the 24 is also included, citing it as being the start of relevant movements in anticipation of their upcoming preliminary attack outside Pogradec. The battle resulted in a Greek victory, the engagement ending by December 6 on Pogradec's periphery, the city itself having fallen on 30 November, when Greek troops entered the city. Other sources list December 1 as the date of the city's fall proper. (Note: Possibly when the takeover took effect, possible that discrepancy is due to nighttime attack, i.e., attack at 11:00, victory by 12:00, thus at another day.)
