= Proptisht =

- Administrative unit
- Location within Albania
- Coordinates: 40°59′N 20°30′E
- Country: Albania
- County: Korçë
- Municipality: Pogradec

Population (2011)
  - Administrative unit: 4,785
- Time zone: UTC+1 (CET)
  - Summer (DST): UTC+2 (CEST)
- Postal Code: 7308
- Area Code: (0)860

Proptisht is a village and a former municipality in the Korçë County, southeastern Albania. At the 2015 local government reform it became a subdivision of the municipality Pogradec. The population at the 2011 census was 4,785. The municipal unit consists of the villages Proptisht, Rodokal Sipër, Rodokal Poshtë, Homezh, Slabinjë, Somotinë, Kriçkovë, Selcë e Poshtme, Homçan, Vërri, Golik, Slatinë, Baribardhë, Selishtë and Zalltore.
