= Golek, Krško =

Golek
- Location in Slovenia
- Coordinates: 45°57′37.75″N 15°27′14.86″E
- Country: Slovenia
- Traditional region: Lower Carniola
- Statistical region: Lower Sava
- Municipality: Krško

Area
  - Total: 1.11 km^{2} (0.43 sq mi)
- Elevation: 426.8 m (1,400 ft)

Population (2002)
  - Total: 87
- Postal code: 8270

Golek (pronounced [ˈɡɔːlɛk] or [ˈɡoːlɛk] or [ˈɡɔːlək] or [ˈɡoːlək]) is a settlement in the hills northwest of Leskovec pri Krškem in the Municipality of Krško in eastern Slovenia. The area is part of the traditional region of Lower Carniola. It is now included in the Lower Sava Statistical Region.

Three prehistoric graves have been found and recorded in the vicinity of the settlement.
