= Golik =

Golik is a surname. Notable people with this surname include:

- Bogdan Golik (born 1963), Polish politician
- Gordan Golik (born 1985), Croatian football player
- Krešo Golik (1922–1996), Croatian director
- Mathew Golik (1948–2008), mayor of Wolf Point, Montana
- Matija Golik (born 1993), Croatian handball player
