= Trebinjë =

- Administrative unit
- Location within Albania
- Coordinates: 40°55′N 20°33′E
- Country: Albania
- County: Korçë
- Municipality: Pogradec

Population (2011)
  - Administrative unit: 2,481
- Time zone: UTC+1 (CET)
  - Summer (DST): UTC+2 (CEST)
- Postal Code: 7307
- Area Code: (0)860

Trebinjë is a village and a former municipality in the Korçë County, southeastern Albania. At the 2015 local government reform it became a subdivision of the municipality Pogradec. The population at the 2011 census was 2,481. The municipal unit consists of the villages Trebinjë, Çezmë e Madhe, Çezmë e Vogël, Hondisht, Selcë e Sipërme, Llëngë, Plenisht, Hoshtecë, Zemcë, Potgozhan, Malinë, Kalivaç, Pevelan, Dunicë and Guri i Bardhë. Lika Yanko has roots from the village of Llëngë from her mother Efrosina.
