= Buçimas =

- Administrative unit
- Location within Albania
- Coordinates: 40°53′30″N 20°40′50″E
- Country: Albania
- County: Korçë
- Municipality: Pogradec

Population (2011)
  - Total: 15,687
- Time zone: UTC+1 (CET)
  - Summer (DST): UTC+2 (CEST)
- Postal Code: 7304
- Area Code: (0)868

Buçimas is an administrative unit in the municipality of Pogradec, Korçë County, Albania. The village of Buçimas is the seat of the eponymous unit and consist of the adjacent villages of Bahçallëk, Gështënjas, Gurras, Peshkëpi, Remenj, Tushemisht and Vërdovë.

Ibrahim Starova, (born Ibrahim Ethem Sojliu; 22 March 1865 – 5 August 1945), better known as Ibrahim Temo, was an Ottoman-Albanian politician, revolutionary, intellectual, and a medical doctor by profession. Temo was the original founder of the Committee of Union and Progress (CUP). His family were originally from here.

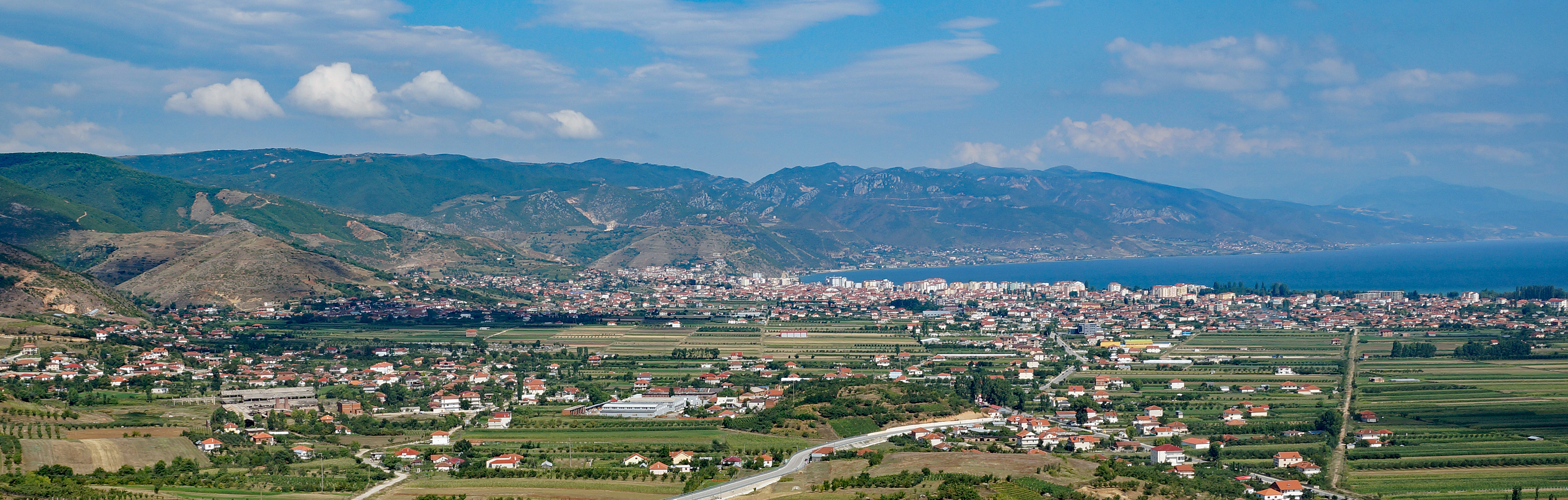
Buçimas Administrative Unit seen from Qafë Plloçë with the houses of Pogradec in the background
