= List of national roads and motorways in Albania =

The national road and motorway network in Albania is one of the youngest in Europe and is constantly being expanded.

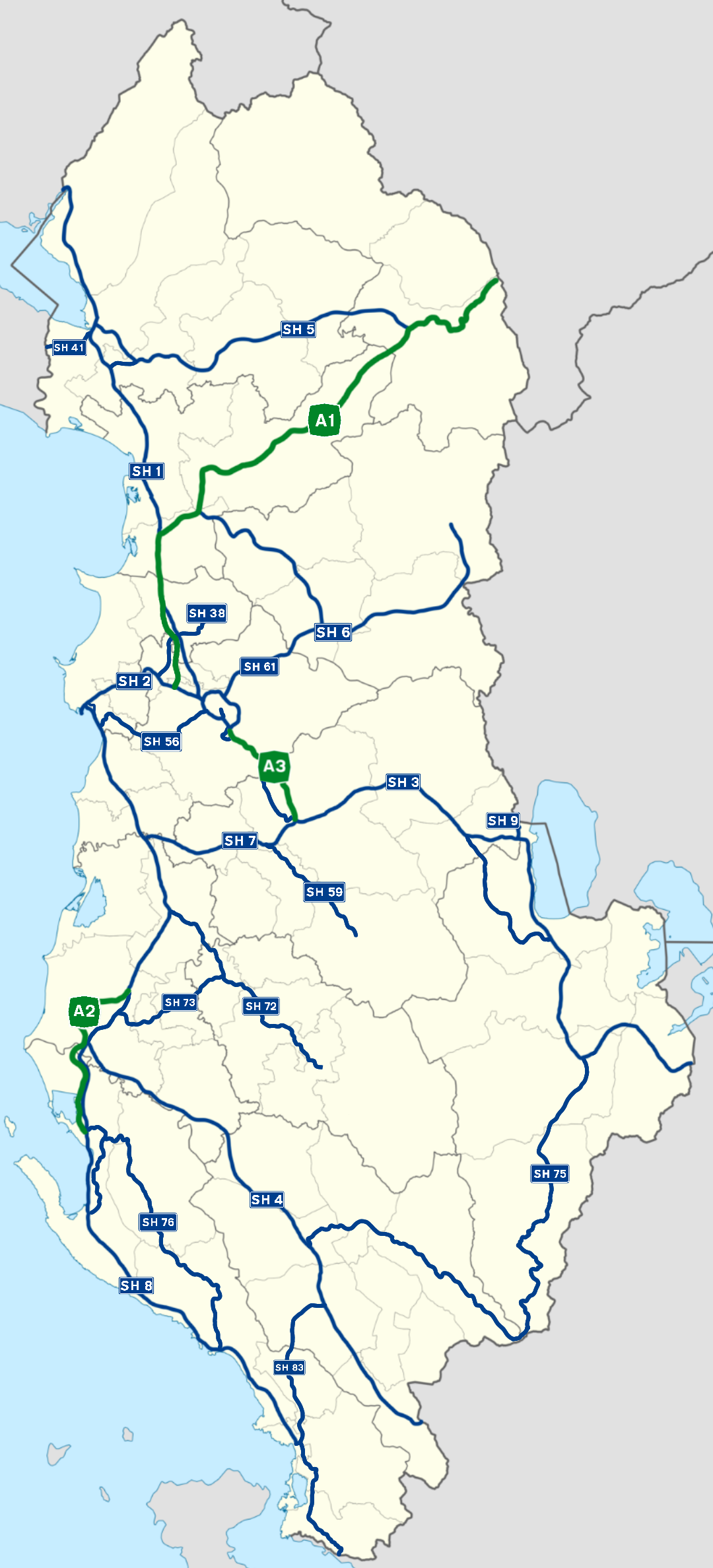
A map of Albania illustrating the current expressways and motorways in Albania.

== Classification ==
All roads in the country are property of Albanian Road Authority (Autoriteti Rrugor Shqiptar (ARRSH)), a directorate subordinated to the Ministry of Transportation and Infrastructure based in Tirana. Currently, cars are free of payment while driving on both motorways and expressways except on A1 motorway which has become a toll highway since March 2018. A2 and A3 are planned to become toll highways shortly. A new road system has been introduced in the early 2000s and is classified as follows:

Type	Name (Albanian)	Name (English)	Description
	Autostradë	Motorway	The motorways are the highest level of roadway in the country, marked as A with a number on a green field.
	Rrugë Shtetërore	State Road	The state roads are the main and most common level of roadway in the country, connecting major cities marked as SH with a number on a blue field.
	Rrugë Rrethi	District Road	The district roads are the lower level of roadway in the country found between districts roadway marked as Rr with a number on a blue field.
	Rrugë Komunale	Municipal Road	The municipal roads are the lowest level of roadway in the country, typically found in rural areas and marked as K with a number on a white field though it is not observed on the ground.

== List of motorways ==
Character of the motorways
Lane	Designation	Description
	Rruga Autostradale (Motorway)	Dual carriageway road with four lanes and hard shoulders on both sides

Type	Code	European route	From (North or West)	To (South or East)	Routes	Length	Status
			Morinë	Kashar	Morinë, Kukës, Rrëshen, Milot, Fushë-Krujë, Rinas Kashar	148.0 km (92.0 mi)	Completed; Milot - Rrëshen expressway single road with 26 km.
		—	Fier	Vlorë	Mbrostar, Dërmenas, Levan, Novoselë, Narte	46.0 km (28.6 mi)	Completed
			Tirana	Elbasan	Sauk, Krrabë, Bradashesh	31.1 km (19.3 mi)	Completed Tiranë-Elbasan Section and Labinot Fushë-Mirakë Section (for Pan-European Corridor VIII). Majority under Construction.
			Durrës	Tirana	Durrës, Sukth, Vorë, Kashar, Tirana	32.0 km (19.9 mi)	Completed Casa Italia - Airport junction (6km) section, is now 3+1 emergency lines with green marking.
			Durrës	Fier	Durrës, Kavajë, Rrogozhinë, Lushnjë, Kolonjë, Mbrostar	71.0 km (44.1 mi)	Completed
		—	Durrës Interchange	Plepa	Shkozet, Plepa	5.9 km (3.7 mi)	Completed
	Corridor VIII		Labinot-Fushë (Elbasan)	Mirakë (Elbasan)	Labinot-Fushë, Mirakë	7.1 km (4.4 mi)	Opened a part of Corridor VIII

== List of expressways ==
Character of the expressways
Lane	Designation	Description
	Rruga Autostradale (Motorway)	Dual carriageway road with two lanes and hard shoulders on both sides

Code	European route	From (North or West)	To (South or East)	Routes	Length	Status
		Milot	Rrëshen	Milot, Rubik, Rrëshen	26.0 km (16.2 mi)	Completed
		Hani i Hotit	Kamëz Interchange	Hani i Hotit, Koplik, Shkodër, Lezhë, Milot, Thumanë, Fushë-Krujë, Kamëz, Tirana	111.0 km (69.0 mi)	Completed
		Kapshticë	Bradashesh	Elbasan, Librazhd, Përrenjas, Pogradec, Maliq, Korçë, Bilisht	160.0 km (99.4 mi)	Completed
		Levan	Kakavijë	Levan, Mallakastër, Memaliaj, Tepelenë, Gjirokastër, Kakavijë	129.0 km (80.2 mi)	Completed
	—	Rrogozhinë	Elbasan	Rrogozhinë, Peqin, Elbasan	40.0 km (24.9 mi)	Completed
	—	Orikum	Dukat	Orikum, Dukat	14.1 km (8.8 mi)	Completed
		Qafë Thanë	Lin	Qafë Thanë, Lin	2.6 km (1.6 mi)	Completed
	—	Vorë	Fushë-Krujë	Vorë, Fushë-Krujë	11.0 km (6.8 mi)	Completed
		Muriqan	Shkodër	Muriqan, Oblikë, Shkodër	12.0 km (7.5 mi)	Completed
	—	Cërrik	Drizë	Cërrik, Drizë	25.0 km (15.5 mi)	Completed
	—	Rinas	Kashar	Rinas, Kashar	9.4 km (5.8 mi)	Completed
	—	Tirana	Peshkopi	Tufinë, Murriz, Bulqizë, Shupenzë, Maqellarë, Peshkopi	87.0 km (54.1 mi)	Completed
	—	Drizë	Gramsh	Drizë, Gramsh	7.3 km (4.5 mi)	Completed
	—	Korçë	Ersekë	Korçë, Ersekë	36.0 km (22.4 mi)	Completed
	—	Kardhiq	Delvinë	Kardhiq, Finiq, Delvinë	33.0 km (20.5 mi)	Completed
Vlorë Bypass	—	Vlorë	Orikum	Vlorë, Babicë, Kaninë, Orikum	28.0 km (17.4 mi)	Completed
Llogara Tunnel	—	Dukat	Dhermi	Dukat, Dhermi	6.8 km (4.2 mi)	Completed

== List of main roads ==
Character of the roads
Lane	Designation	Description
	Rruga Kryesore (Main Street)	Two lanes and no hard shoulders on both sides
	Rruga Kryesore me drejtim i dyfishtë njëkahësh (one-way dual direction)	One lane and no hard shoulders on both sides

Code	From	To	Length	Routes	Status
	Tirana	Bradashesh (Elbasan)	46.8 km (29.1 mi)	Tirana, Sauk, Mullet, Bërzhitë, Petresh, Bradashesh	Completed
	Shkodër	Kolsh	135.0 km (83.9 mi)	Shkodër, Guri i Zi, Vau i Dejës, Pukë, Fushë-Arrëz, Qafë-Mali, Lajthizë, Shëmri, Kalimash, Kolsh	Completed
	Milot	Peshkopi	114.9 km (71.4 mi)	Milot, Ulëz, Baz, Burrel, Klos, Shupenzë, Maqellarë, Peshkopi	Completed
	Fier	Sarandë	145.0 km (90.1 mi)	Fier, Levan, Novoselë, Panaja, Nartë, Vlorë, Orikum, Dukat, Dhermi, Himarë, Borsh, Lukovë, Sarandë	Completed
	Qafë-Mali	Qafë-Morinë (Tropojë)	88.0 km (54.7 mi)	Qafë-Mali, Flet, Mëzi, Fierzë, Bajram Curri, Sopot, Qafë-Morinë	Completed
	Bushat	Balldren	22.0 km (13.7 mi)	Bushat, Barbullush, Gjadër, Balldren	Completed
	Pllanë (Lezhë)	Hadroj (Pukë)	79.0 km (49.1 mi)	Pllanë, Fierzë, Rubik, Rrëshen, Gëziq, Shpal, Rras, Gjegjan, Gojan, Shkozë, Hadroj	Completed; Segment Pllanë - Shpal is poor condition
	Kukës	Peshkopi	72.0 km (44.7 mi)	Kukës, Shtiqën Bicaj, Domaj, Bushtricë, Kullas, Sllovë, Sohodoll, Peshkopi	Completed
	Rrëshen	Lurë	55.0 km (34.2 mi)	Rrëshen, Perlat, Lëkundë, Lurë	Poor condition
	Fushë-Krujë	Milot	29.0 km (18.0 mi)	Fushë-Krujë, Borizanë, Thumanë, Mamurras, Katund i Ri, Sanxhak, Laç, Milot	Completed
	Tirana	Plepa	33.0 km (20.5 mi)	21 Dhjetori, Ish Fusha e Druve, Kombinat, Vaqarr, Pezë, Ndroq, Pjezë, Plepa	Completed; Segment Pezë - Plepa; Under reconstruction
SH65	Leskovik	Tre Urat SH80	13.0 km (8.1 mi)	Leskovik, Glinë, Tre Urat	Completed
SH68	Jeta e Re	Kosovo (Belsh)	6.1 km (3.8 mi)	Jeta e Re, Kosovo (Belsh)	Completed
	Shirgjan; SH70	Libonik	113.0 km (70.2 mi)	Shirgjan, Tregan, Cekrezi, Kacivel, Drizë, Pishaj, Gramsh, Kodovajt, Bratilë, Kucakë, Lozhan, Maliq, Libonik	Poor condition Segment Drizë - Libonik is Completed with 85km
	Lushnjë	Piskovë (Përmet)	124.5 km (77.4 mi)	Lushnjë, Karburanë, Fier-Shegan, Dimal, Berat, Poliçan, Çorovodë, Sevran, Raban, Piskovë	Completed Segment Çorovodë - Piskovë with 25.5km in Poor condition
	Fier	Dimal	30.0 km (18.6 mi)	Fier, Patos, Roskovec, Kutalli, Dimal	Completed
SH74	Goricë (Berat)	Këlcyrë	77.6 km (48.2 mi)	Goricë, Drobonik, Zhitom, Tërpan, Buz, Ballaban, Këlcyrë	Poor condition
	Korçë	Tepelenë	158.0 km (98.2 mi)	Korçë, Mollaj, Ersekë, Borovë, Leskovik, Çarcovë, Përmet, Piskovë, Këlcyrë, Dragot, Tepelenë	Completed
	Vlorë	Tepelenë	78.4 km (48.7 mi)	Vlorë, Babicë, Drashovicë, Kotë, Vajzë, Sinanaj, Veliqot, Tepelenë	Completed
SH78	Jorgucat	Vrion	36.0 km (22.4 mi)	Jorgucat, Muzinë, Delvinë, Bamatat, Blerimas, Vrion	Poor condition
SH100	Peshkëpi	Poçëm	22.0 km (13.7 mi)	Peshkëpi, Vllahinë, Poçëm	Poor condition
K123	Gradisht (Belsh)	Polovinë (Kuçovë); SH91	20.0 km (12.4 mi)	Gradisht, Kajan, Dragot, Vlashuk, Kozarë, Polovinë	Completed
—	Shëngjin	Velipojë	11.0 km (6.8 mi)	Shëngjin, Baks-Rrjoll	Completed
—	Qafë-Plloçë (Pogradec)	Qukës (Përrenjas)	43.1 km (26.8 mi)	Qafë-Pllocë, Kalivaç, Trebinjë, Zemcë, Mokër, Karkavec, Qukës	Completed

=== Berat County ===
Code	From	To	Length	Routes	Status
SH91	Dimal	Kuçovë	7.0 km (4.3 mi)	Dimal, Kuçovë	Completed
SH92	Kuçovë; SH91	Perondi	3.1 km (1.9 mi)	Kuçovë, Perondi	Completed

=== Dibër County ===
Code	From	To	Length	Routes	Status
	Burrel	Muhurr	55.0 km (34.2 mi)	Burrel, Zenisht, Burgajet, Murrë, Selishtë, Bufull, Muhurr	Poor condition
	Burrel	Komsi	6.8 km (4.2 mi)	Burrel, Muzhaka, Komsi	Completed
	Maqellarë	Bllatë	3.3 km (2.1 mi)	Maqellarë, Bllatë	Completed
	Qafë-Buellit	Minierat	3.3 km (2.1 mi)	Qafë-Buellit, Minierat	Poor condition
	SH 6 (Albania)	Ulëz	2.3 km (1.4 mi)	—	Completed
	Qafë-Buellit	Krastë	17.0 km (10.6 mi)	Qafë-Buellit, Krastë	Poor condition

=== Durrës County ===
Code	From	To	Length	Routes	Status
	Fushë-Krujë	Qafë-Shtamë	33.0 km (20.5 mi)	Fushë-Krujë, Halill, Krastë, Krujë, Nojë, Qafë-Shtamë	Completed
	Maliq Muco	Sektor	11.0 km (6.8 mi)	Maliq Muco, Shënvlash, Fllakë, Qerret, Bisht-Kamëz, Sektor	Completed
SH51	Durrës	Kepi i Pallit	7.4 km (4.6 mi)	Durrës, Spitallë, Kepi i Pallit	Completed
SH55	Maminas	Pejzë	10.4 km (6.5 mi)	Maminas, Vlashaj, Borakë, Sukth, Sallmonaj, Xhafzotaj, Rreth, Pejzë	Completed
SH62	Ura Gjoles	Bubq	3.7 km (2.3 mi)	Ura Gjoles, Bubq	Completed
	Durrës	Shijak	7.0 km (4.3 mi)	Durrës, Xhafzotaj, Shijak	Completed

=== Elbasan County ===
Code	From	To	Length	Routes	Status
SH58	Cërrik	Belsh	10.1 km (6.3 mi)	Cërrik, Shalës, Belsh	Completed
SH70	Elbasan	Cërrik	15.0 km (9.3 mi)	Elbasan, Mjekës, Kuqan, Shirgjan, Gjegjan, Thanë, Cërrik	Completed
SH88	Elbasan; SH88	Gjinar	21.0 km (13.0 mi)	Elbasan, Hajdaran, Mlizë, Shelcan, Gjinar	Completed
SH89	Kodovajt (Gramsh)	Kukur	16.0 km (9.9 mi)	Kodovajt, Shelcan, Zamshe, Kukur	Completed

=== Fier County ===
Code	From	To	Length	Routes	Status
SH57	Çermë	Divjakë	14.0 km (8.7 mi)	Çermë, Shënepremte, Divjakë	Completed
SH66	Dërmenas SH94	Pojan; Apolonia	3.3 km (2.1 mi)	Dërmenas, Pojan; Apolonia	Completed
SH67	Kolonjë	Ardenicë Monastery	3.6 km (2.2 mi)	Kolonjë, Adrenicë Monastery	Completed
SH93	Zharëz (Patos)	Marinëz (Roskovec)	2.6 km (1.6 mi)	Zharëz, Marinëz	Completed
SH94	Fier	Topojë	11.0 km (6.8 mi)	Fier, Afrim, Çlirim, Dërmenas, Hoxharë, Topojë	Completed
Old road of	Patos	Damës	41.0 km (25.5 mi)	Patos, Lalar, Visokë, Ballsh, Greshicë, Fratar, Damës	Completed
—	Ballsh; Old road	Hekal	10.0 km (6.2 mi)	Ballsh, Kash, Hekal	Completed

=== Gjirokastër County ===
Code	From	To	Length	Routes	Status
SH69	Gllavë SH74	Mali Komar	2.6 km (1.6 mi)	Gllavë, Mali Komar	Poor condition
SH80	Çarcovë	Tre Urat	7.7 km (4.8 mi)	Çarcovë, Tre Urat	Completed
SH96	Sofratikë (Dropull)	Libohovë	7.4 km (4.6 mi)	Sofratikë, Libohovë	Completed

=== Korçë County ===
Code	From	To	Length	Routes	Status
SH63	Korçë	Voskopojë	18.0 km (11.2 mi)	Korçë, Turan, Voskop, Voskopojë	Completed
	Pogradec	Tushemisht	6.3 km (3.9 mi)	Pogradec, Drilon, Tushemisht	Completed
SH79	Zëmblak (Korçë)	Goricë	32.0 km (19.9 mi)	Zëmblak, Zvezdë, Pustec, Goricë	Completed
SH87		Lin	1.7 km (1.1 mi)	Lin	Completed
SH90	Boboshticë	Dardhë	14.0 km (8.7 mi)	Boboshticë, Dardhë	Completed
SH101	Plasë	Libonik	12.0 km (7.5 mi)	Plasë, Pendavinji, Rrëmbec, Dridhas, Libonik	Completed
—	Bilisht	Hoçisht	6.8 km (4.2 mi)	Bilisht, Hoçisht	Completed
—	Zvezdë SH79	Grabovicë	19.0 km (11.8 mi)	Zvezdë, Shëngjergj, Bregas, Podgorie, Grabovicë	Completed

=== Kukës County ===
Code	From	To	Length	Routes	Status
	Kukës	Sopot (Tropojë)	91.0 km (56.5 mi)	Kukës, Tregtan, Krumë (Has), Golaj, Kam, Pac, Sopot	Completed
	Kukës	Shishtavec	28.0 km (17.4 mi)	Kukës, Topojan, Novosej, Shishtavec	Completed
—	Golaj	Qafë-Prushi	6.4 km (4.0 mi)	Golaj, Letaj, Qafë-Prushi	Completed
—	Viçidol	Tropojë Aste	2.7 km (1.7 mi)	Viçidol, Tropojë	Completed
—	Bajram Curri	Valbonë	28.0 km (17.4 mi)	Bajram Curri, Margegaj, Dragobi, Valbonë	Completed
—	Dushaj (Tropojë)	Lekbibaj (Nikaj- Mërtur)	14.0 km (8.7 mi)	Dushaj, Breg- Lumi, Tetaj, Lekbibaj	Completed

=== Lezhë County ===
Code	From	To	Length	Routes	Status
	Lezhë	Shëngjin	6.2 km (3.9 mi)	Lezhë, Shëngjin	Completed
	Ishull-Lezhë	Vain Beach	5.6 km (3.5 mi)	Ishull-Lezhë, Lagja e Hotelit, Vain	Unknown situation
	Laç	Patok	11.0 km (6.8 mi)	Laç, Gorre, Patok	Completed
	Shpal	Gjakza (Fan)	25.3 km (15.7 mi)	Shpal, Reps, Bisak, Fan, Zall xhuxhë, Gjakza	Unknown

=== Shkodër County ===
Code	From	To	Length	Routes	Status
	Hani i Hotit	Vermosh	62.0 km (38.5 mi)	Hani i Hotit, Rrapsh-Starja, Tamarë, Selcë, Vermosh	Completed
	Koplik	Theth	56.0 km (34.8 mi)	Koplik, Dedaj, Bogë, Theth	Unknown situation
	Shkodër	Zogaj	9.6 km (6.0 mi)	Shkodër, Shirokë, Zogaj	Completed
	Vau i Dejës	Koman	33.0 km (20.5 mi)	Vau i Dejës, Karmë, Koman	Poor Condition but it is right now for reconstruction
	Bedricë	Velipojë	26.0 km (16.2 mi)	Bedricë, Trush, Gomsiqe, Velipojë	Completed
	Mjedë	Kosmaç	6.4 km (4.0 mi)	Mjedë, Shelqet, Stajkë, Kosmaç	Completed
	Dedaj	Razëm	12.0 km (7.5 mi)	Dedaj, Vrith, Razëm	Poor condition
	Kryezi	Kimëz	20.0 km (12.4 mi)	Kryezi, Lumbardhë, Tuç, Qafë-Bari, Kimëz	Poor condition
—	Fushë-Arrëz	Iballë	30.0 km (18.6 mi)	Fushë-Arrëz, Kryezi, Iballë	Completed

=== Tirana County ===
Code	From	To	Length	Routes	Status
	Priskë	Dajti	7.9 km (4.9 mi)	Priskë, Dajti	Completed
	Mushqeta	Krrabë	3.8 km (2.4 mi)	Mushqeta, Krrabë	Completed
SH53	Bathore (Kamëz)	Zall-Herr	5.5 km (3.4 mi)	Bathore, Zall-Herr	Completed
SH54	Tirana	Qafë-Mollë	24.0 km (14.9 mi)	Selvia, Medreseja, Allias, Kinostudio, Fresku, Linzë, Surrel, Priskë, Qafë-Mollë	Completed until there

=== Vlorë County ===
Code	From	To	Length	Routes	Status
SH77	Sherishtë	Selenicë	19.0 km (11.8 mi)	Sherishtë, Peshkëpi, Libonjë, Selenicë	Completed
	Sarandë	Butrint	17.0 km (10.6 mi)	Sarandë, Manastir, Ksamil, Butrint	Completed
SH82	Peshkëpi; SH77	Drashovicë	3.0 km (1.9 mi)	Peshkëpi, Drashovicë	Completed
—	Blerimas	Çlirim	4.4 km (2.7 mi)	Blerimas, Finiq, Çlirim	Completed
SH95	Orikum	Pasha Liman	5.6 km (3.5 mi)	Orikum, Pasha Liman	Completed
SH97	Krane (Finiq) SH99	Qafë-Botë	34.0 km (21.1 mi)	Krane, Livadhja, Vagalat, Shkallë, Konispol, Qafë-Botë	Completed
SH98	Metoq (Sarandë)	Shkallë	27.0 km (16.8 mi)	Metoq, Çukë, Pllakë, Mursi, Shkallë	Completed
SH99	Gjashtë (Sarandë)	Muzinë SH78	23.0 km (14.3 mi)	Gjashtë, Vrion, Çlirim, Mesopotam, Bistricë, Muzinë	Completed
—	Kuç	Qeparo	17.0 km (10.6 mi)	Kuç, Pilur, Kudhës, Qeparo	Completed

== Under reconstruction ==
Code	Type	From	To	Length	Routes	Scheduled completion
Corridor VIII		Labinot-Fushë (Elbasan)	Librazhd	16.0 km (9.9 mi)	Labinot-Fushë, Mirakë, Librazhd	In 2027
Corridor VIII		Lekaj (Rrogozhinë)	Elbasan	40.7 km (25.3 mi)	Lekaj, Rrogozhinë, Peqin, Pajovë, Cërrik, Elbasan	In 2027

== See also ==
- Highways in Albania
- Motorways in Albania
- Transport in Albania
- Tourism in Albania
