= Memzotaj =

- Settlement
- Location within Albania
- Coordinates: 41°24′N 19°36′E
- Country: Albania
- County: Durrës
- Municipality: Shijak
- Administrative unit: Maminas
- Time zone: UTC+1 (CET)
  - Summer (DST): UTC+2 (CEST)

Memzotaj is a village situated in the central plains of Albania's Western Lowlands region. It is part of Durrës County.
