= Mafsheq =

- Village
- Location within Albania
- Coordinates: 41°33′N 19°48′E
- Country: Albania
- County: Durrës
- Municipality: Krujë
- Administrative unit: Cudhi
- Time zone: UTC+1 (CET)
  - Summer (DST): UTC+2 (CEST)

Mafsheq is a village located in the Durrës County, in Albania. At the 2015 local government reform it became part of the municipality Krujë. Historically the village of Mafsheq has been part of Kurbin District. Mafsheq is separated from Kruje region by Shkreta creek (Albanian: prroji i Shkretes) and the famous Weeping Gorge (Albanian: Gryka e vajes), where after the fall of the city of Kruja to the Ottomans in the 14th century AD, about ninety ethnic Albanian women jumped from a nearby cliff to their death.

== Description ==
The village of Mafsheq is located on a mountain slope just above the old village (Albanian: Katuni i vjeter) where three creeks meet and form the Droja River (Albanian: lumi i Drojes). Mafsheq has a mild Mediterranean mountain climate and there is limited pollution. The area is suitable for hiking and a source of herbs. The water is clean, and there are caves and ancient ruins which date back thousands of years. There are Albanian-constructed stone homes that are hundreds of years old, and have Judeo-Christian symbols carved on them, such as "Kulla Likes" or "Kulla e Beges". Not many live there as most have moved down to Kruja or Fush-kruja but there are still people who live there. Mafsheq has also small rivers contain crystal clean water like the river (Gurrat). Mafsheq is also known for the people that have jumped off cliffs and died there are also small family grave sites. There are also big farms that the villagers look after.

== Demographic history ==
the village of Mafsheq (Mavroshak) appears in the Ottoman defter of 1467 as a hass-ı mir-liva property in the vilayet of Akçahisar. The settlement had a total of six households which were represented by: Duka Gjika, Ilia Sirodi, Nikolla Kipota, Pal Mavroshuji, Gjergj Besraku, and Lesh Suma.
