= Rinas =

- Village
- Location within Albania
- Coordinates: 41°26′N 19°43′E
- Country: Albania
- County: Tirana
- Municipality: Krujë
- Administrative unit: Nikël
- Time zone: UTC+1 (CET)
  - Summer (DST): UTC+2 (CEST)

Rinas (Albanian definite form: Rinasi) is a village in the county of Durrës, Albania, about 18 km northwest of the capital, Tirana. At the 2015 local government reform it became part of the municipality Krujë. It is the site of Tirana International Airport, which is about 18 kilometres (11 mi) away from Tirana.
