= Motorways in Albania =

Autostradat shqiptare
- Route markers for motorways A1, A2, A3

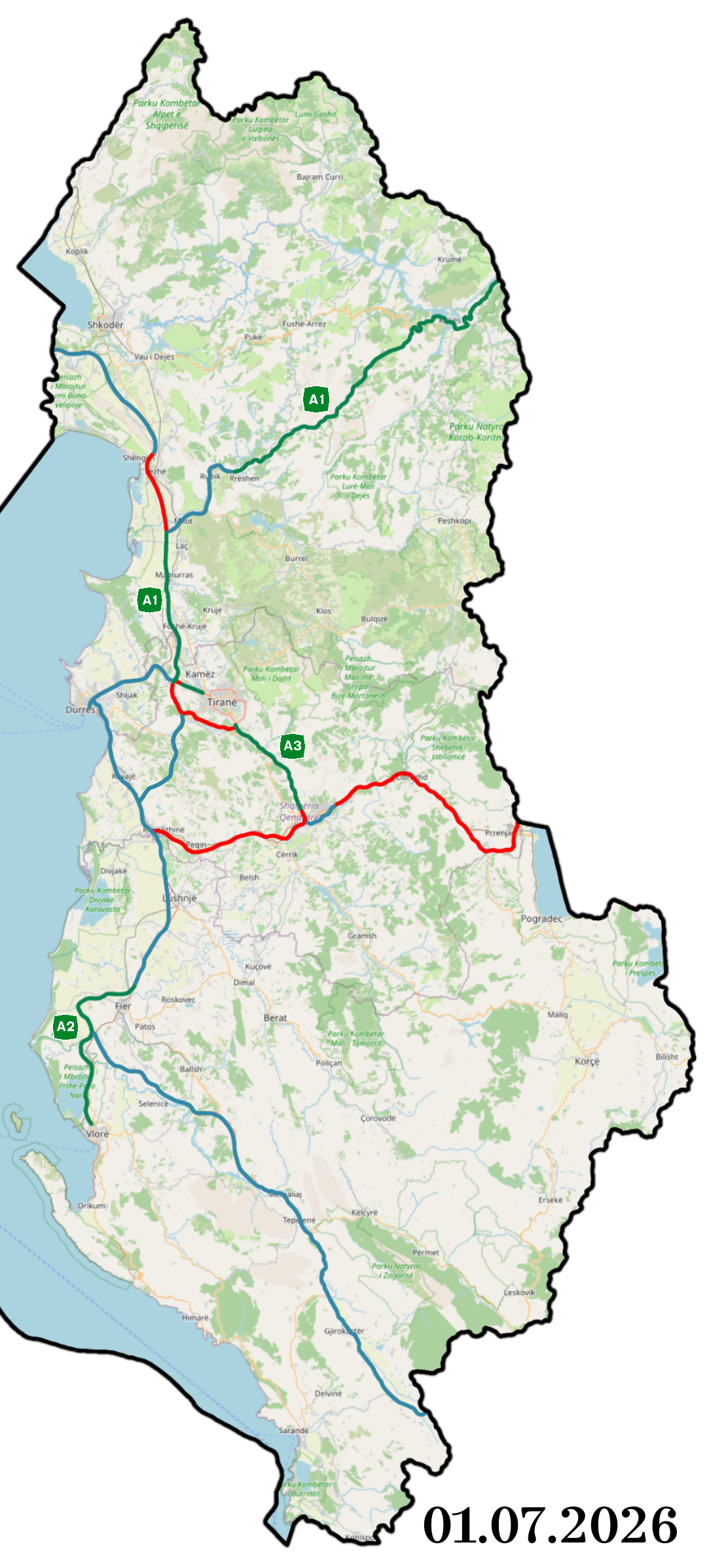
- A map of the Albanian motorway network Completed; Under construction Planned

System information
- Maintained by Autoriteti Rrugor Shqiptar
- Length: 191.6 km (119.1 mi)

Highway names
- Autostrada: Autostrada X (A X)

The motorways in Albania (Albanian: Autostrada or Autostradë) are the controlled-access highway system in Albania predominantly under the supervision of the Ministry of Infrastructure and Energy. The motorways are characterised as roads with at least two lanes in each driving direction including an emergency lane and a maximum allowed speed limit of not less than 130 kilometres per hour (81 mph).

== History ==
The development of the motorway network in Albania is relatively recent, beginning in the early 2000s as part of the country’s efforts to modernise its infrastructure. Until then, Albania had an underdeveloped road network that was largely inadequate for the growing demands of both domestic traffic and international transit. After the communist era (1945–1991), Albania had poorly maintained roads, many of which were narrow, unpaved, and unsuitable for modern vehicles. This posed problems for Albania's economic development, trade, and tourism.

After the fall of communism, the country embraced market reforms and began opening up to the global economy. The need for a robust motorway system became clear, particularly for trade with neighboring countries and better access to Europe. The first major project was to build the 170-kilometer Rruga e Kombit ("Road of the Nation"), a motorway connecting Albania to Kosovo. Officially opened in 2010, it is a vital corridor for commerce, linking the Adriatic port city of Durrës with the northeastern town of Kukës and the border with Kosovo.

The Rruga e Kombit project was transformative not only for Albania but also for the broader Balkan region, as it significantly reduced travel time between Albania and Kosovo, fostering stronger economic and cultural ties. The motorway was built with the assistance of international funding, including loans from the World Bank and the European Bank for Reconstruction and Development (EBRD), showcasing Albania's efforts to attract foreign investment for infrastructure improvements. However, the project was also controversial due to its high cost, complex engineering challenges—particularly the construction of tunnels and bridges through mountainous terrain—and allegations of corruption.

Next, Albania expanded its motorway network to include key routes connecting major cities and neighbouring countries. One of the most important projects is the reconstruction of the Tirana-Durrës road, from Durrës to the capital, Tirana. It is part of the Pan-European Corridor VIII. The Tirana-Durrës road, a congested two-lane road, is being upgraded to a three-lane as well as an emergency lane motorway, significantly reducing travel time and increasing safety for the thousands of vehicles that use it daily.

In addition to improving connectivity with neighboring countries, Albania's motorway development focused on enhancing the domestic road network to boost regional development. The A2 motorway, which connects Fier with the southern coastal city of Vlorë, was opened in 2019 and provides improved access to the tourism hotspots along the Albanian Riviera. This project, like many others, received financial support from international donors and was seen as a strategic investment in the country's tourism industry, one of its most important economic sectors.

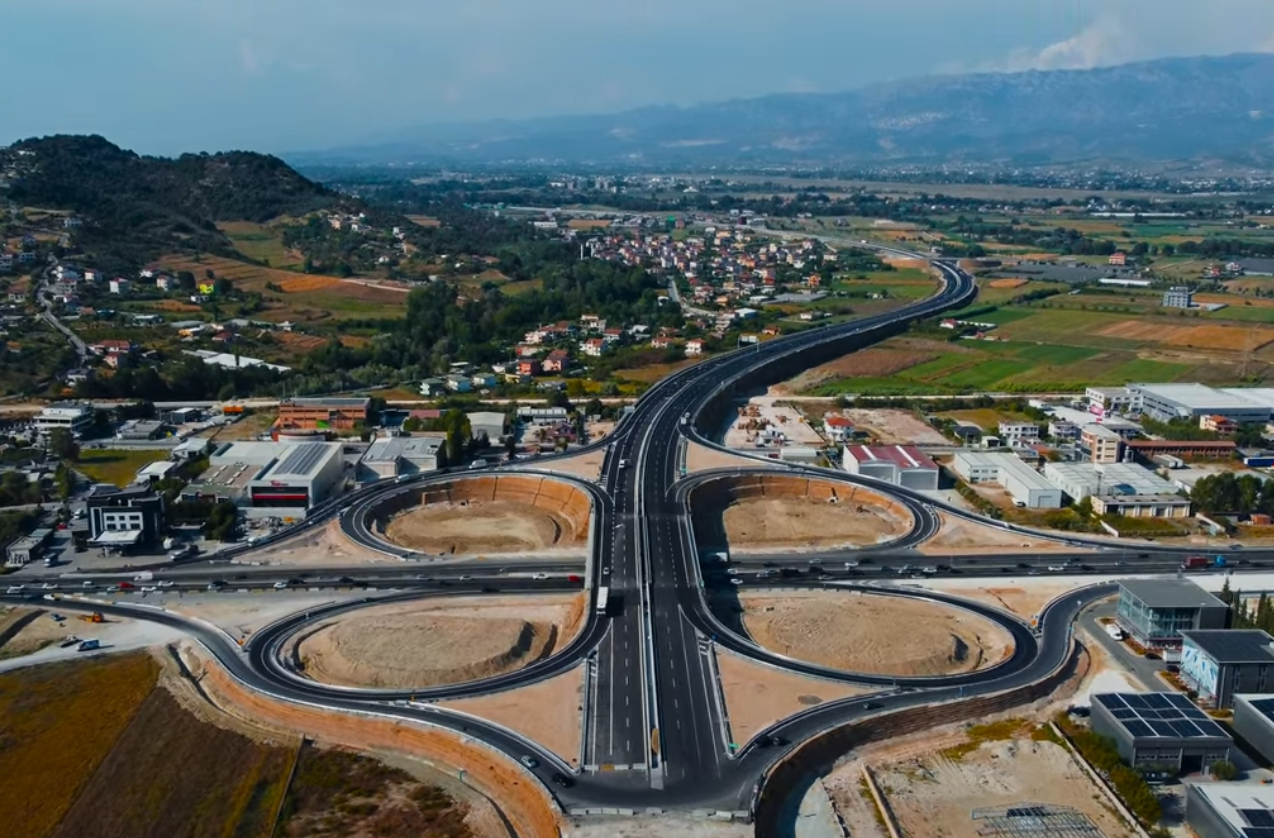
A1 interchange in Kashar

Despite progress, Albania's motorway system still faces problems, particularly with maintenance, road safety, and funding. Some segments of the network have been criticized for poor quality construction, leading to rapid deterioration. Road safety remains a concern, with Albania having one of the highest rates of traffic accidents in Europe. To address these issues, the Albanian government has initiated several reforms, including the introduction of toll roads to generate revenue for maintenance and improvements, as well as campaigns to improve driving behavior and enforce traffic laws.

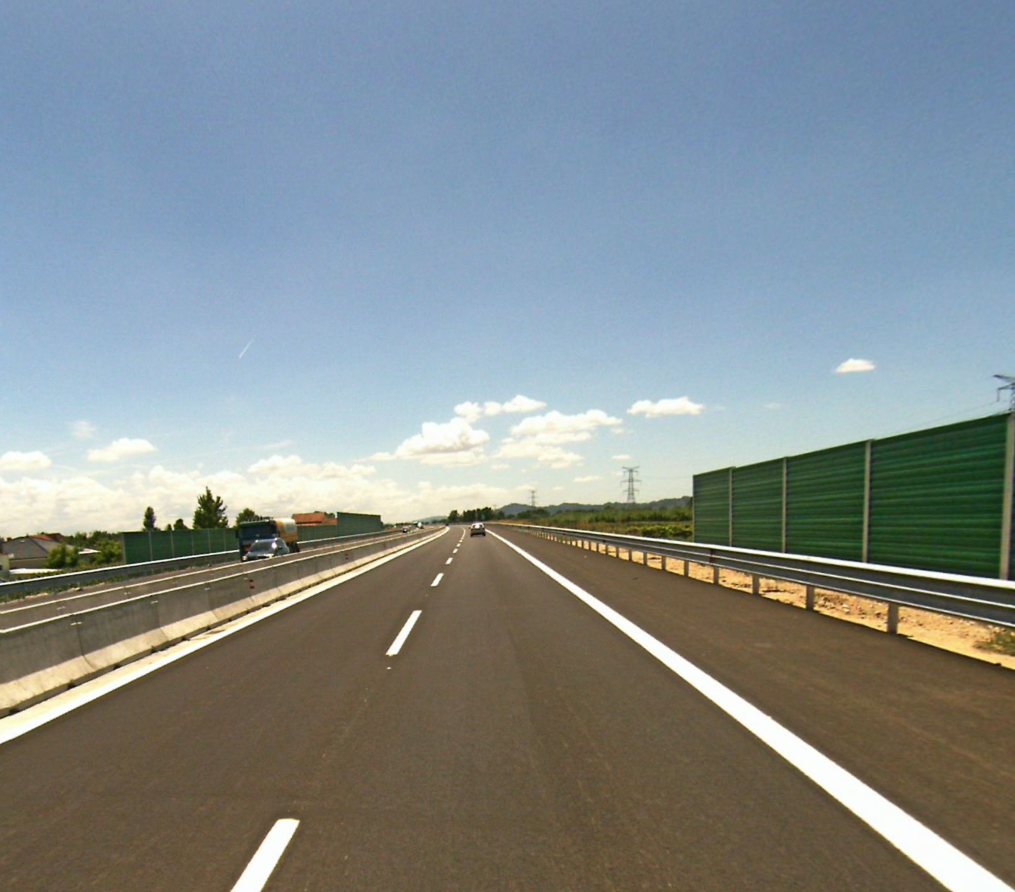
A1 motorway near Gramëz

Environmental and social concerns have also been raised regarding motorway expansion, particularly in areas of ecological significance. For instance, plans to extend the road network through the Vjosa River valley, one of Europe's last wild rivers, sparked protests from environmental groups, who argued that such projects could damage effects on biodiversity and local communities. Balancing the need for infrastructure development with environmental preservation has become a key issue in Albania's motorway planning.

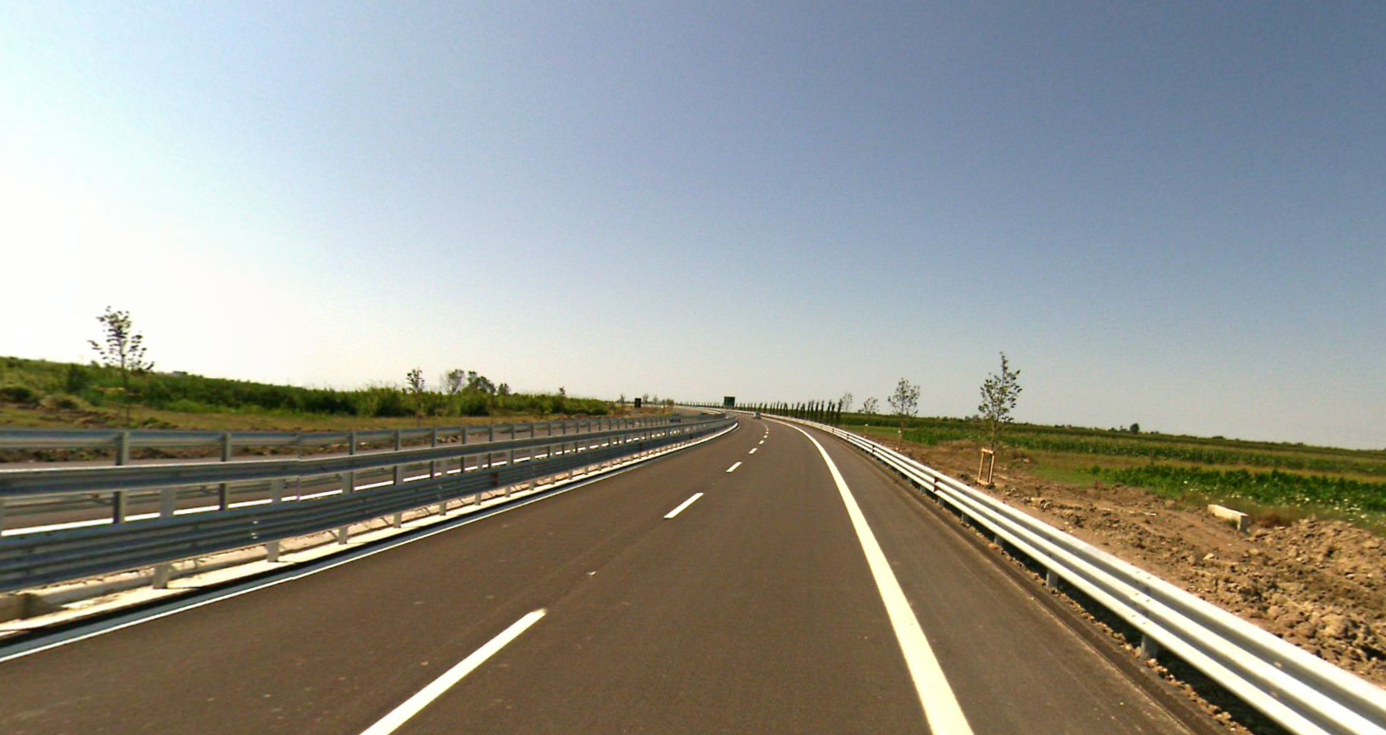
A2 motorway near Shtyllas

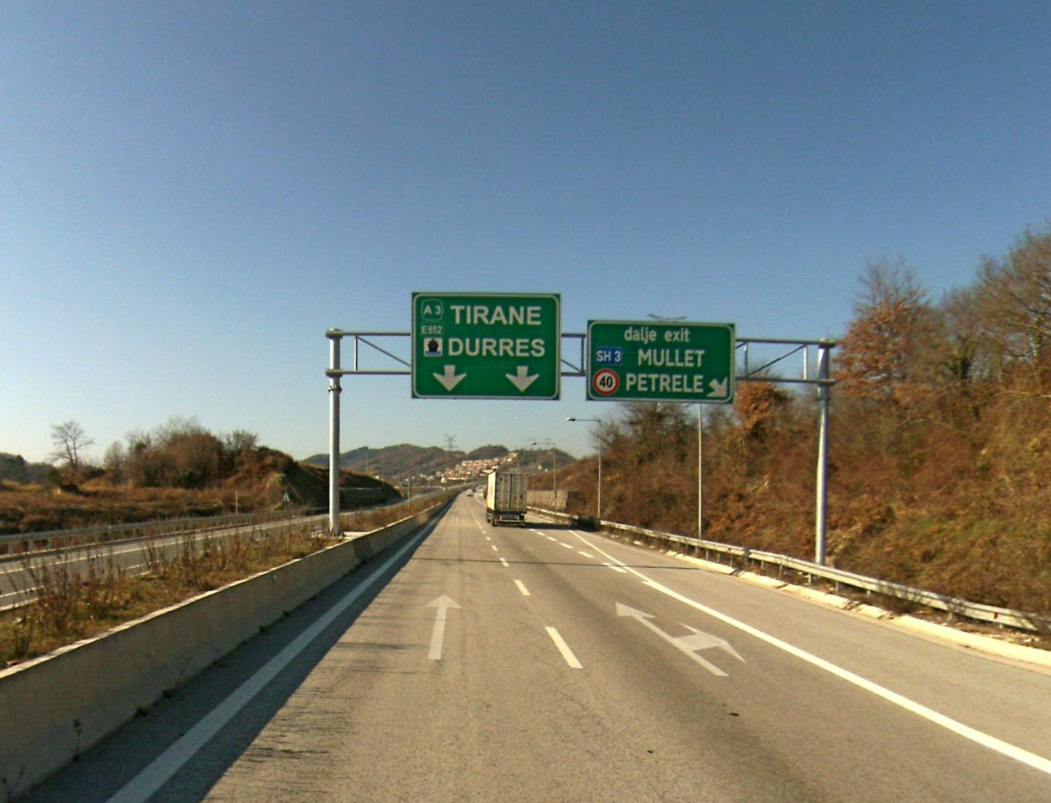
A3 motorway near Mullet

Today, Albania continues to expand its motorway network, with several projects currently under way or being planned: such as a proposed motorway connecting Tirana with the southern city of Gjirokastër, and further improvements to the road linking Albania with Montenegro. While Albania's motorway network is still modest compared to other European countries, it represents a significant leap forward from the country's post-communist road conditions. The ongoing expansion reflects Albania's broader aspirations for economic integration with Europe and its strategic positioning as a gateway between the Balkans and the Mediterranean.

In Late June 2024, the Thumanë-Kashar highway opened as part of the Adriatic-Ionian motorway, the segment between Thumanë and Kashar consists of around 20 kilometres (12 mi) long. A total of 2 intersections, 11 bridges and 12 underpasses. Toll booths have also been installed on the Thumanë-Kashar segment, with vehicle users paying a fee of €2.1 each way. Payments can be made in cash (local currency, Lek) and often in Euros. Electronic toll collection systems are in place, allowing for quicker transactions. These include contactless payment options and prepaid toll cards.

== Motorways and sections ==
=== List of motorways ===
Motorway	Route	Length (in 2024)	Description
A1	Morinë, Kukës, Rrëshen, Milot, Fushë-Krujë, Kashar	148.0 km (92.0 mi)	The A1 starts on the border of Kosovo near Morinë. The motorway passes through Kukës and proceeds west towards Milot, where the Milot interchange connects the SH1 to the north and the A1 to the south. It continues south to Thumane, Fushe-Kruje, Kashar and Tirana. It terminates at the Kashar Interchange.
A2	Fier, Levan, Vlorë	46.0 km (28.6 mi)	The A2 starts from Fier. The motorway passes south through Fier and Levan and proceeds towards Vlore where the motorway ends.
A3	Sauk, Krraba, Bradashesh	26.0 km (16.2 mi)	The A3 starts at the TEG Shopping Center interchange connection with Tirana's Outer Ring in Lundër near Sauk south of the Grand Park of Tirana, and follows a route parallel to the SH3 on the Erzen Valley as far as the village of Krrabë. Close to the boundary between the counties of Tirana and Elbasan, the motorway passes along the Krraba Tunnel. It continues within the Kusha Valley towards Elbasan, where it meets the SH3 again at Bradashesh where the motorway ends.
Autostrada Tiranë - Durrës	Casa Italia, Mezëz, Yrshek, Kashar, Tirana Interchange	6.7 km (4.2 mi)	Casa Italia - Airport junction (6km) section, is now 3+1 emergency lines with green marking.

=== Motorway sections under construction ===
Motorway	County	Length	Section	Description	Scheduled completion
A3	Elbasan, Korce	50.12 km (31.14 mi)	Elbasan - Qafe Thane	Construction of four lane motorway started in November 2022.	2027
Corridor VIII	Elbasan	30km (18.64 mi)	Elbasan - Lekaj	Connect to future Adriatic-Ionian highway	2026
Adriatic–Ionian motorway	Lezhë	16.19 km (10.06 mi)	Balldren - Milot	Between Balldren and Milot including a tunnel near Lezhë	2027

=== Planned motorway sections ===
Motorway	County	Length	Section	Details of planned new section
A1	Lezhë	25 km	Milot - Rrëshen	The plan is to build an extra lane in each direction to full motorway standards
Adriatic–Ionian motorway	Shkoder, Lezhë	40.94 km (25.43 mi)	Muriqan - Balldren	Between Muriqan border crossing and SH1 at Balldren
Adriatic–Ionian motorway	Tirana	55 km (34 mi)	Kashar - Lekaj	To link Tirana with current SH4 at Lekaj

== See also ==
- Transport in Albania
  - Highways in Albania
- Economy of Albania
- List of national roads and motorways in Albania
