= Metochi =

Metochi may refer to:

- Metochion, an ecclesiastical embassy church in Eastern Orthodoxy
- places in Greece:
  - Metochi, Larissos, a settlement in the municipal unit of Larissos, Achaea
  - Metochi, Kalavryta, a settlement in the municipality of Kalavryta, Achaea
  - Metochi Dirfyon, a village in the municipal unit of Kymi, Euboea
  - Metochi Kireos, a village in the municipal unit of Kireas, Euboea
  - Kato Metochi, a village in the municipality of Oropedio Lasithiou, Lasithi
- the Greek name for Metoq, a village in the Sarandë District, southern Albania
