= Bamatat =

- Village
- Location within Albania
- Coordinates: 39°56′22″N 20°3′50″E
- Country: Albania
- County: Vlorë
- Municipality: Delvinë
- Administrative unit: Delvinë
- Time zone: UTC+1 (CET)
  - Summer (DST): UTC+2 (CEST)

Bamatat (Albanian definite form: Bamatati) is a populated place in the Vlorë County of Albania. It is part of the municipality of Delvinë. The village is inhabited by Muslim Albanians.
