= Plasë =

Plasë Pleasa, Pliasa
- Village
- Location within Albania
- Coordinates: 40°41′N 20°51′E
- Country: Albania
- County: Korçë
- Municipality: Maliq
- Administrative unit: Pojan

Population (2022)
  - Total: ca. 1,000
- Time zone: UTC+1 (CET)
  - Summer (DST): UTC+2 (CEST)

Plasë (Albanian definite form: Plasa; Aromanian: Pleasa or Pliasa) is a large village in Korçë County, Albania. It was part of the former municipality Pojan. After the 2015 local government reform it became part of the municipality Maliq. It is located in the centre of the county, slightly to the east, about 8 kilometers northeast from the city of Korçë.

It has a population of about 1000, and about 300 houses; however new houses are being built, especially two floor houses, which are rarely seen in villages. It has beautiful mountains and an Orthodox church on top of the mountains. It is also close to the Albanian-Greek border. It has many pubs especially downtown and many tourists visit this village. Also it has two beautiful creeks that bring fresh water from the top of the mountains. Plasë is one of the most agricultural villages in the Korçë Terrain.
