= Patok =

- Village
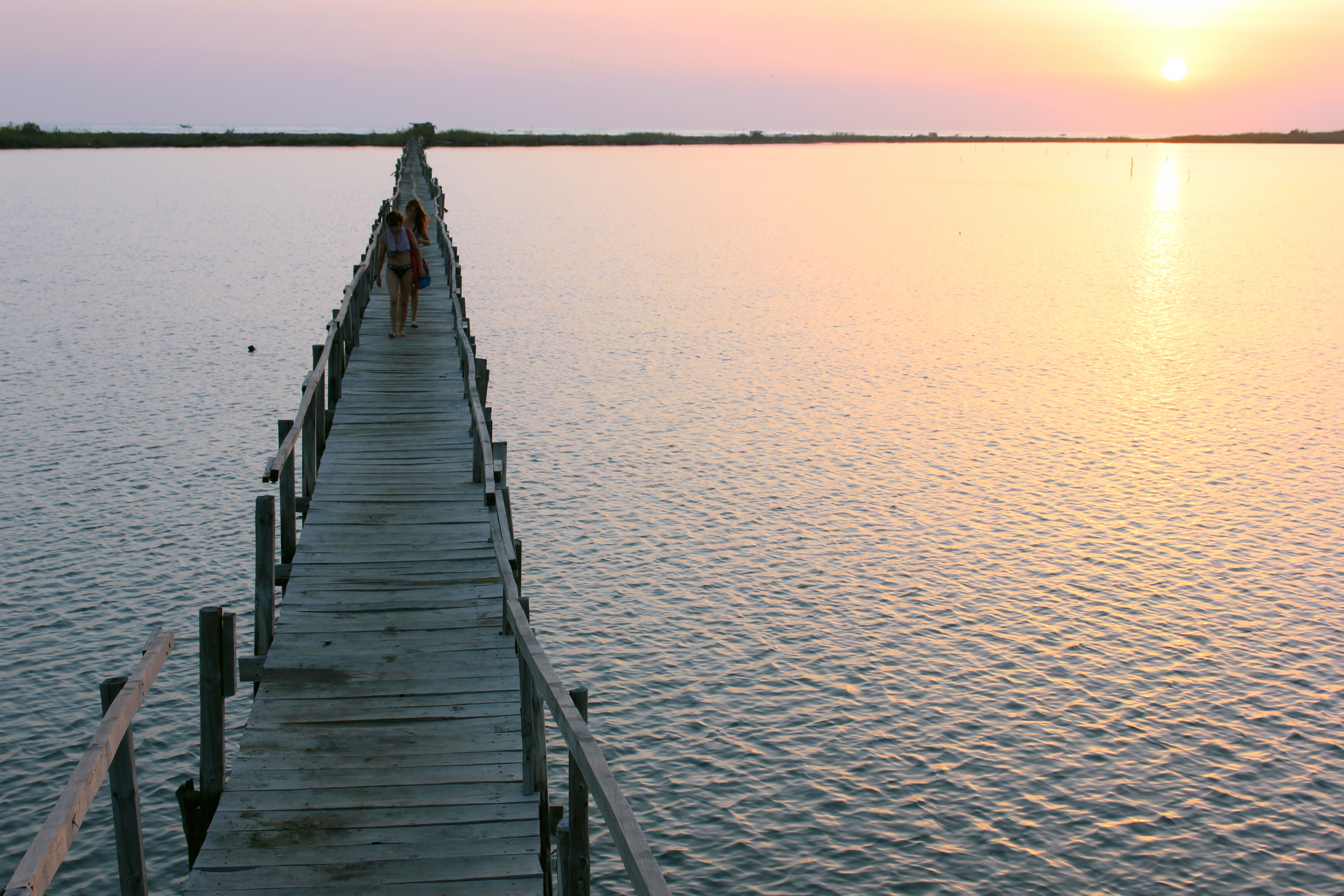
- Footbridge in Patok

- Location within Albania
- Coordinates: 41°37′34″N 19°35′33″E
- Country: Albania
- County: Lezhë
- Municipality: Kurbin
- Administrative unit: Fushë Kuqe
- Time zone: UTC+1 (CET)
  - Summer (DST): UTC+2 (CEST)

Patok is a municipality in the former Fushë-Kuqe Commune, Lezhë County, northwestern Albania. At the 2015 local government reform, it became part of the municipality Kurbin.
