= Vrion, Sarandë =

Vrion Βρυώνι
- Village
- Location within Albania
- Coordinates: 39°52′42″N 20°3′18″E
- Country: Albania
- County: Vlorë
- Municipality: Finiq
- Administrative unit: Finiq
- Time zone: UTC+1 (CET)
  - Summer (DST): UTC+2 (CEST)

Vrion (Albanian definite form: Vrioni; Greek: Βρυώνι) is a village in Vlorë County, southwestern Albania. It is part of the municipality Finiq. It is located to the east of Sarandë, next to the village of Metoq.

== Etymology ==
The name of the village stems from the surname of Omer Vrioni.

== Demographics ==
The village is inhabited by Greeks, and the population was 1,168 in 1992.
