= Blerimas, Vlorë =

Blerimas
- Village
- Location within Albania
- Coordinates: 39.92°N 20.04°E
- Country: Albania
- County: Vlorë
- Municipality: Delvinë
- Administrative unit: Delvinë
- Time zone: UTC+1 (CET)
  - Summer (DST): UTC+2 (CEST)

Blerimas is a village in the Vlorë County, southern Albania. It is part of the municipality Delvinë. The village is inhabited by Muslim Albanians.
