= Zogaj, Shkodër =

Zogaj
- Settlement
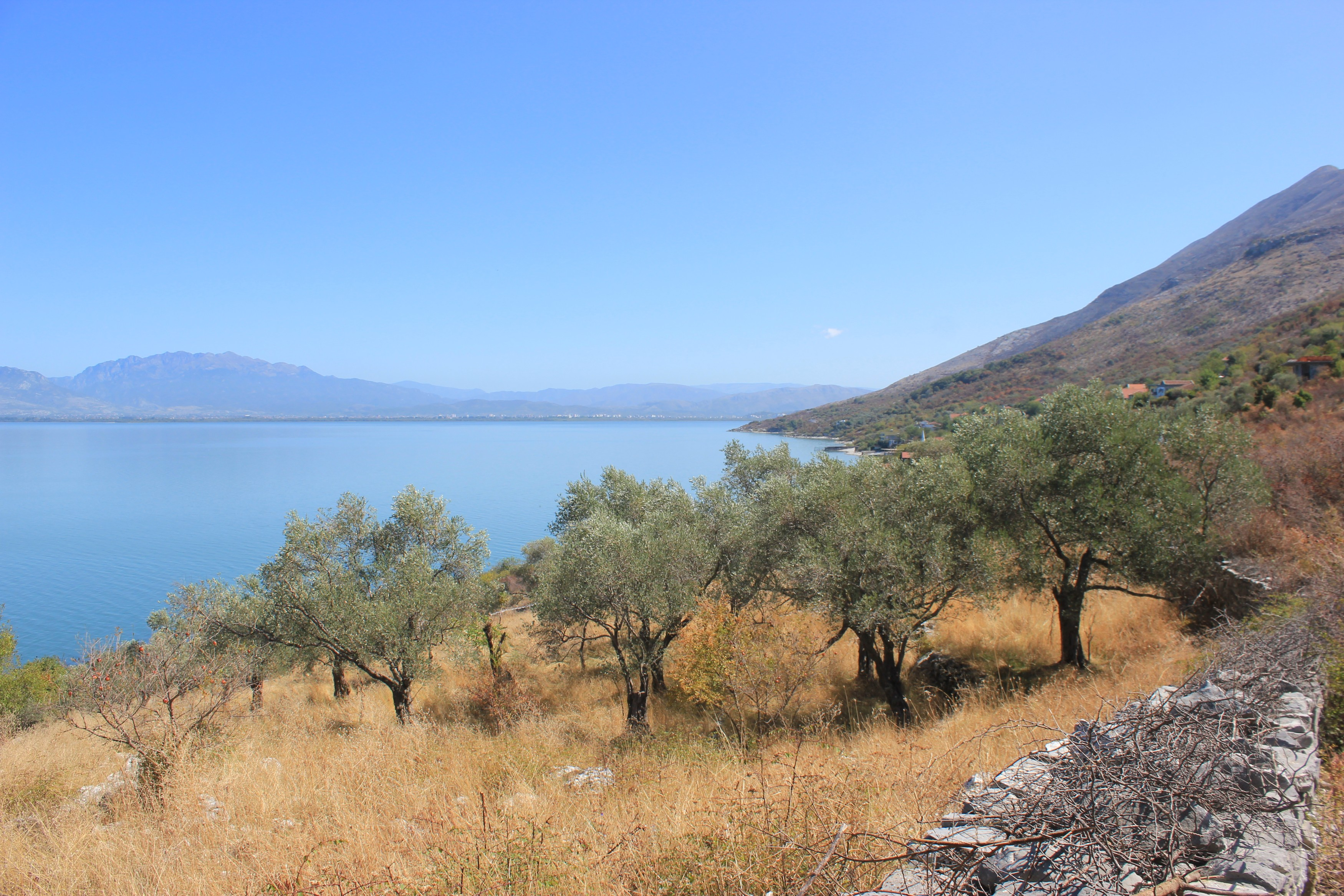
- Coast of Lake Scutari in Zogaj

- Location within Albania
- Coordinates: 42°4′15″N 19°23′57″E
- Country: Albania
- County: Shkodër
- Municipality: Shkodër
- Administrative unit: Shkodër
- Demonym(s): Albanian: Zaganjor (m), Zaganjore (f)
- Time zone: UTC+1 (CET)
  - Summer (DST): UTC+2 (CEST)
- Postal Code: 4007

Zogaj is a settlement in the Shkodër municipality, Shkodër County, northwestern Albania on the shore of Lake of Shkodër. The village is very close to the border with Montenegro. It was mentioned as Zagagni by Mariano Bolizza in 1614, being part of the Sanjak of Scutari. It was Roman Catholic, had 25 houses, and 50 men at arms commanded by Alla Andrà.
