= Gjepalaj =

- Administrative unit
- Location within Albania
- Coordinates: 41°20′N 19°35′E
- Country: Albania
- County: Durrës
- Municipality: Shijak

Population (2011)
  - Administrative unit: 3,449
- Time zone: UTC+1 (CET)
  - Summer (DST): UTC+2 (CEST)

Gjepalaj is a village and a former municipality in the Durrës County, western Albania. During the 2015 local government reform, it became a subdivision of the municipality Shijak. The population at the 2011 census was 3,449.
