= Qendër Ersekë =

- Administrative unit
- Location within Albania
- Coordinates: 40°23′N 20°42′E
- Country: Albania
- County: Korçë
- Municipality: Kolonjë

Population (2011)
  - Administrative unit: 2,673
- Time zone: UTC+1 (CET)
  - Summer (DST): UTC+2 (CEST)
- Postal Code: 7401
- Area Code: (0)872

Qendër Ersekë is a former municipality in the Korçë County, southeastern Albania. At the 2015 local government reform it became a subdivision of the municipality Kolonjë. The population at the 2011 census was 2,673. The municipal unit consists of the villages Starje, Bejkovë, Psar, Selenicë, Kreshovë, Gostivisht, Lëngës, Kodras, Kabash, Borovë, Taç Qëndër, Taç Poshtë, Taç Lartë, Rehovë, Gjonç and Prodan.
