= Shezë =

- Administrative unit
- Location within Albania
- Coordinates: 41°1′N 19°49′E
- Country: Albania
- County: Elbasan
- Municipality: Peqin

Population (2011)
  - Administrative unit: 3,177
- Time zone: UTC+1 (CET)
  - Summer (DST): UTC+2 (CEST)

Shezë is a former municipality in the Elbasan County, central Albania. At the 2015 local government reform it became a subdivision of the municipality Peqin. The population at the 2011 census was 3,177. The municipal unit consists of the villages Shezë e Vogël, Shezë e Madhë, Pekisht, Trash, Algjinaj, Gryksh i Vogël and Karthnek.
