= Gracen =

- Administrative unit
- Location within Albania
- Coordinates: 41°9′N 19°58′E
- Country: Albania
- County: Elbasan
- Municipality: Elbasan

Population (2011)
  - Administrative unit: 2,192
- Time zone: UTC+1 (CET)
  - Summer (DST): UTC+2 (CEST)

Gracen is a village and a former municipality in the Elbasan County, central Albania. At the 2015 local government reform it became a subdivision of the municipality Elbasan. The population at the 2011 census was 2,192. The municipal unit consists of the villages Gracen, Plangaricë, Tërbaç, Bodin, Shingjin, Gjormë, Pajengë, Mamli and Dopaj.
