= Qelëz =

- Administrative unit
- Location within Albania
- Coordinates: 42°6′N 19°54′E
- Country: Albania
- County: Shkodër
- Municipality: Pukë

Population (2011)
  - Administrative unit: 1,761
- Time zone: UTC+1 (CET)
  - Summer (DST): UTC+2 (CEST)

Qelëz is a village and a former municipality in the Shkodër County, northern Albania. At the 2015 local government reform it became a subdivision of the municipality Pukë. The population at the 2011 census was 1,761.

The municipality of Qelëz includes the following nine villages:

1. Qelëz
2. Fushë Bushat
3. Dushnezë
4. Midhe
5. Buzhalë
6. Dadaj
7. Lëvrushk
8. Ukth
9. Qerret i Vogël
