= Karinë =

- Administrative unit
- Location within Albania
- Coordinates: 41°03′47″N 19°42′59″E
- Country: Albania
- County: Elbasan
- Municipality: Peqin

Population (2011)
  - Administrative unit: 1,350
- Time zone: UTC+1 (CET)
  - Summer (DST): UTC+2 (CEST)

Karinë is a village and a former municipality in the Elbasan County, central Albania. At the 2015 local government reform it became a subdivision of the municipality Peqin. The population at the 2011 census was 1,350. The municipality consisted of the villages Karinë, Kazije, Rrozej, Progem, Sinametaj, Drangaj and Garunje.
