= Papër =

- Administrative unit
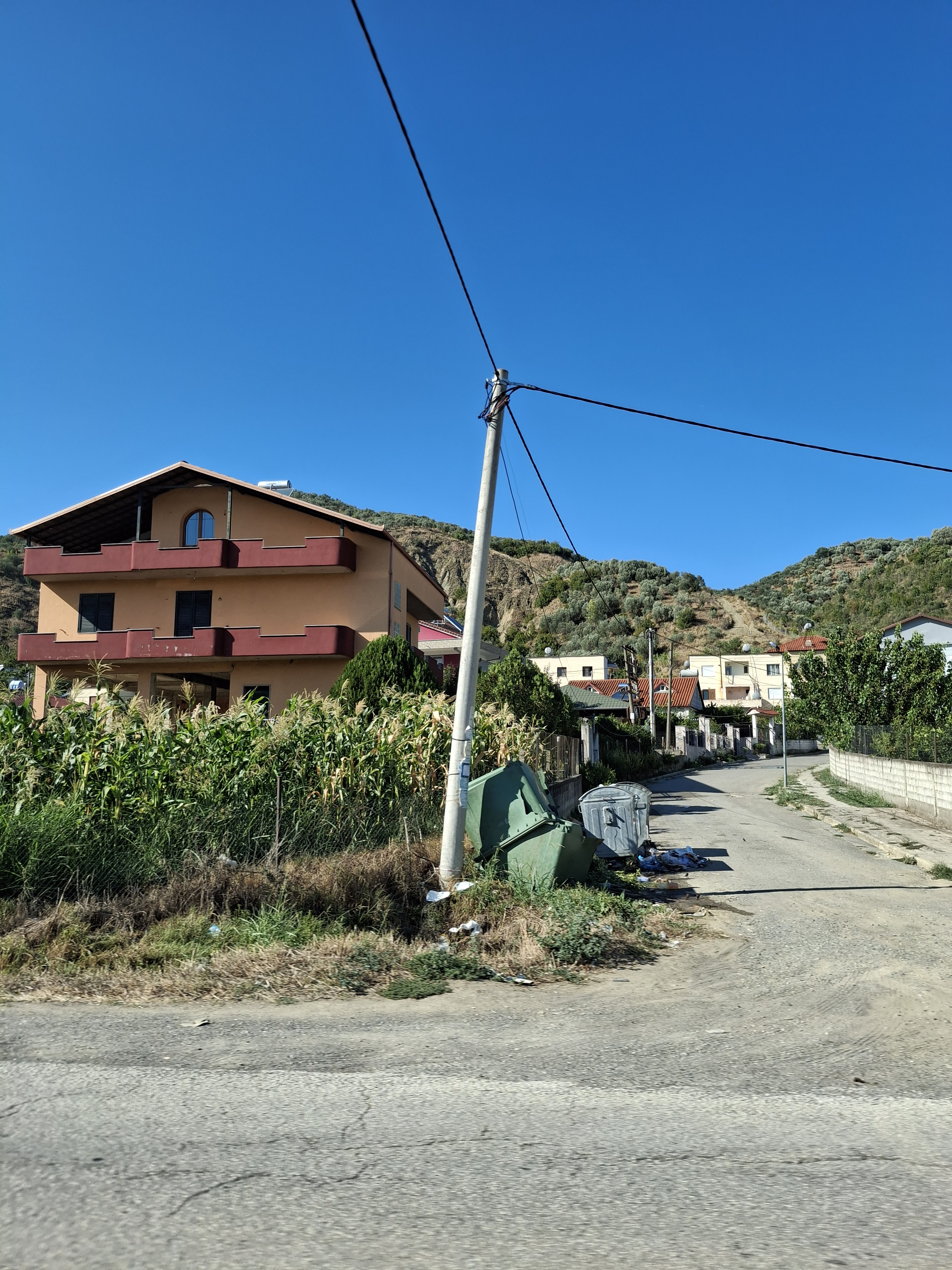

- Location within Albania
- Coordinates: 41°4′N 19°57′E
- Country: Albania
- County: Elbasan
- Municipality: Elbasan

Population (2011)
  - Administrative unit: 6,348
- Time zone: UTC+1 (CET)
  - Summer (DST): UTC+2 (CEST)

Papër is a village and a former municipality in the Elbasan County, central Albania. At the 2015 local government reform it became a subdivision of the municipality Elbasan. The population at the 2011 census was 6,348. It is located along the Elbasan-Rrogozhinë-Durrës highway, 13 km (8 mi) west of Elbasan. It was founded on July 26, 1992. Within its 52 kilometers of borders, the municipal unit of Papër consists of 13 villages: Papër, Vidhas, Broshke, Balldre, Murres, Valas, Lugaj, Pajun, Ullishtaj, Papër-Sollak, Vidhas-Asgjel, Bizhute, and Jatesh.

Since 2000, Shefqet Bullari has been the elected mayor of Papër. The geography of Papër is 60% fields, 30% hills, and 10% mountains. The Shkumbin River flows through Papër. Papër ranges from 60 to 722 meters above sea level.
