= Funarë =

- Administrative unit
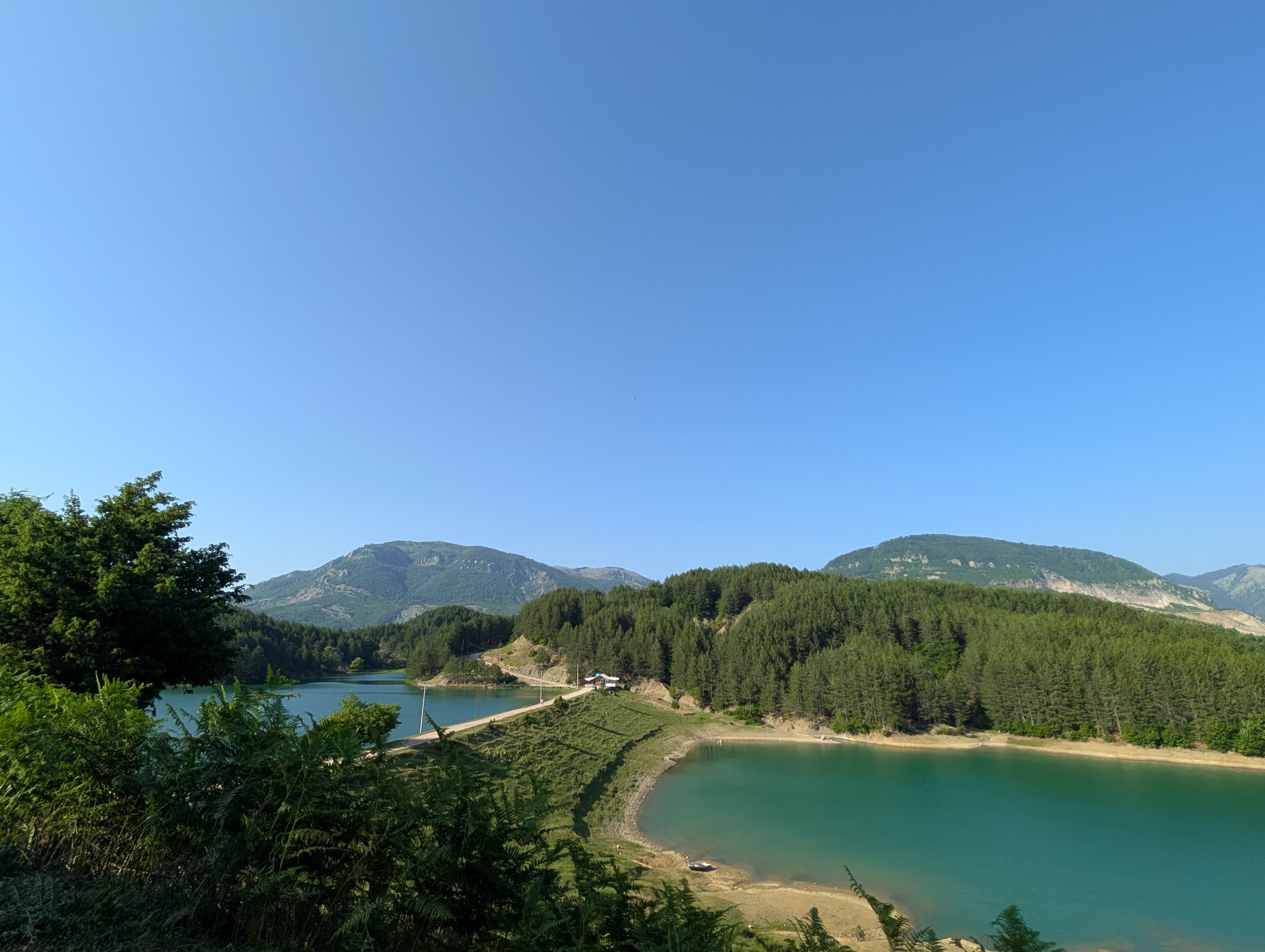

- Location within Albania
- Coordinates: 41°12′N 20°4′E
- Country: Albania
- County: Elbasan
- Municipality: Elbasan

Population (2011)
  - Administrative unit: 2,122
- Time zone: UTC+1 (CET)
  - Summer (DST): UTC+2 (CEST)

Funarë is a former municipality in the Elbasan County, central Albania. At the 2015 local government reform it became a subdivision of the municipality Elbasan. The population at the 2011 census was 2,122. The municipal unit consists of the villages Bixelle, Branesh, Precë e Sipërme, Cerruje, Korre, Mollagjesh, Krrabë e Vogël, Precë e Poshtme and Stafaj.
