= Gjergjan =

- Administrative unit
- Location within Albania
- Coordinates: 41°3′N 20°2′E
- Country: Albania
- County: Elbasan
- Municipality: Elbasan

Population (2011)
  - Administrative unit: 5,126
- Time zone: UTC+1 (CET)
  - Summer (DST): UTC+2 (CEST)

Gjergjan is a village and a former municipality in the Elbasan County, central Albania. At the 2015 local government reform it became a subdivision of the municipality Elbasan. The population at the 2011 census was 5,126. The municipal unit consists of the villages Bujares, Gjonme, Gjergjan, Keshtjelle, Koder Bujares, Muriqan and Thane. The name of the village comes from the Albanian name Gjergj, therefore a Gjergj founded this village. Gjergj is the Albanian name for George.
