= Remas =

- Administrative unit
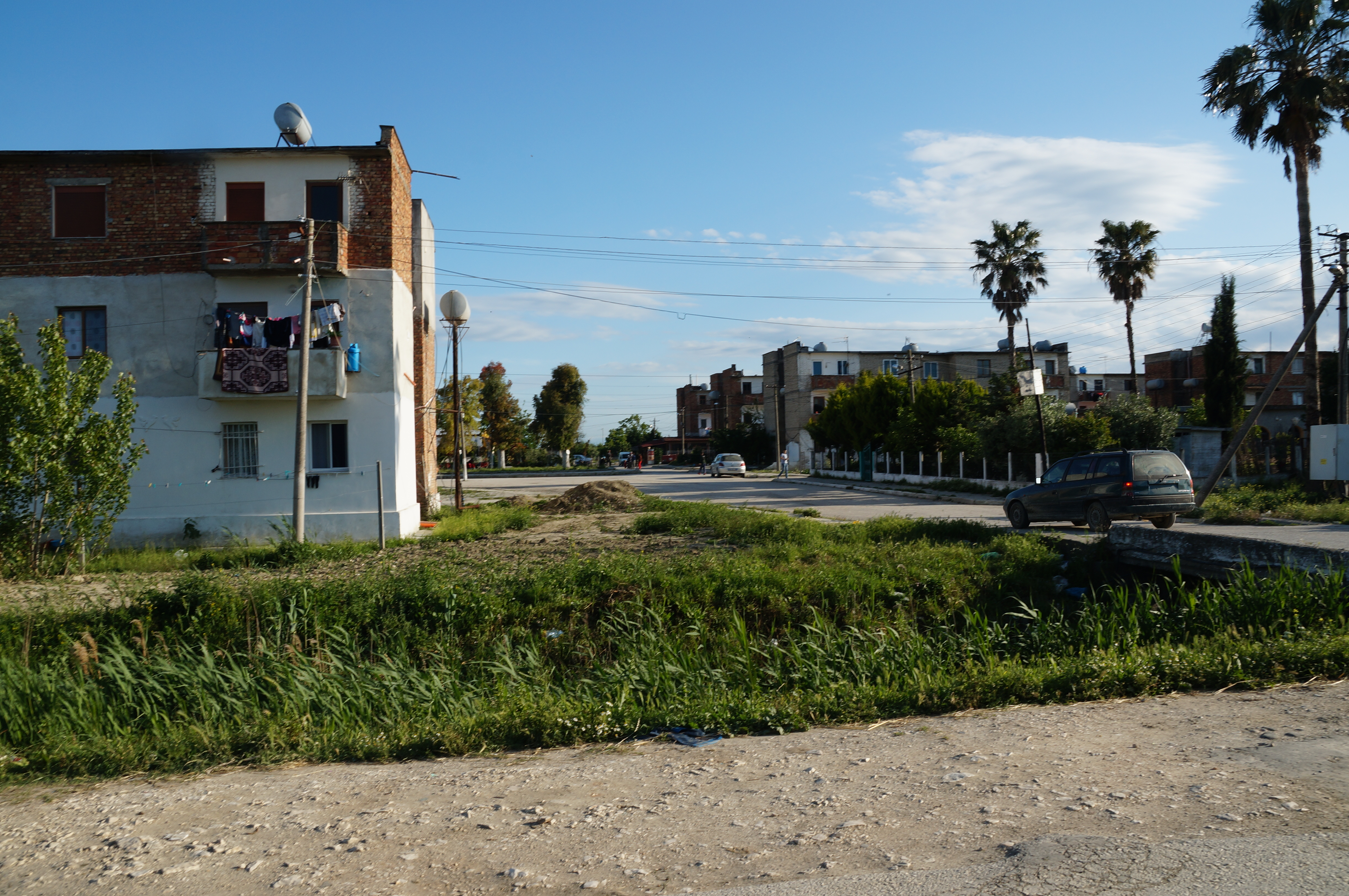
- Center of Karavasta e re

- Location within Albania
- Coordinates: 40°53′N 19°31′E
- Country: Albania
- County: Fier
- Municipality: Divjakë

Population (2011)
  - Administrative unit: 4,449
- Time zone: UTC+1 (CET)
  - Summer (DST): UTC+2 (CEST)

Remas is a village and a former municipality in Fier County, western Albania. At the 2015 local government reform it became a subdivision of the municipality Divjakë. The population at the 2011 census was 4,449. The neighbouring villages are Mucias, Karavasta and Bedat.
