= Metoq =

Metoq Μετόχι
- Village
- Location within Albania
- Coordinates: 39°53′0″N 20°2′44″E
- Country: Albania
- County: Vlorë
- Municipality: Sarandë
- Administrative unit: Sarandë
- Time zone: UTC+1 (CET)
  - Summer (DST): UTC+2 (CEST)

Metoq (Albanian definite form: Metoqi; Greek: Μετόχι Metochi) is a village in Vlorë County, southwestern Albania. It is part of the municipality of Sarandë. It is located to the east of Sarandë, next to the village of Vrion. The village is primarily inhabited by ethnic Greeks.

The ruins of two ancient Greek temples were found in the vicinity of the village. The village stands by the roads that connect Sarandë with the Albanian Riviera, as well as with the national road to Gjirokastër.
