= Vreshtas =

- Administrative unit
- Location within Albania
- Coordinates: 40°48′N 20°47′E
- Country: Albania
- County: Korçë
- Municipality: Maliq

Population (2011)
  - Administrative unit: 7,513
- Time zone: UTC+1 (CET)
  - Summer (DST): UTC+2 (CEST)
- Postal Code: 7028
- Area Code: (0)866

Vreshtas is a village and a former municipality in the Korçë County, southeastern Albania. At the 2015 local government reform it became a subdivision of the municipality Maliq. The population at the 2011 census was 7,513. The municipal unit consists of the villages Vreshtas, Sheqeras, Bregas and Podgorie.
