= Rrapë =

- Administrative unit
- Location within Albania
- Coordinates: 42°3′N 19°57′E
- Country: Albania
- County: Shkodër
- Municipality: Pukë
  - Administrative unit: 48.73 km^{2} (18.81 sq mi)

Population (2011)
  - Administrative unit: 1,357
  - Administrative unit density: 27.85/km^{2} (72.12/sq mi)
- Time zone: UTC+1 (CET)
  - Summer (DST): UTC+2 (CEST)

Rrapë is a village and a former municipality in the Shkodër County, northern Albania. At the 2015 local government reform it became a subdivision of the municipality Pukë. The population at the 2011 census was 1,337.

== Settlements ==
There are 8 settlements within Rrapë:

1. Bicaj
2. Blinisht
3. Breg
4. Buhot
5. Kabash
6. Lumz
7. Meçe
8. Rrapë
