= Zavalinë =

- Administrative unit
- Location within Albania
- Coordinates: 40°59′N 20°17′E
- Country: Albania
- County: Elbasan
- Municipality: Elbasan

Population (2011)
  - Administrative unit: 1,622
- Time zone: UTC+1 (CET)
  - Summer (DST): UTC+2 (CEST)

Zavalinë is a village and a former municipality in the Elbasan County, central Albania. At the 2015 local government reform it became a subdivision of the municipality Elbasan. The population at the 2011 census was 1,622. The municipal unit consists of the villages Zavalinë, Seltë, Kamican, Jeronisht, Nezhan and Burrishtë.
