= Muriqan =

- Village
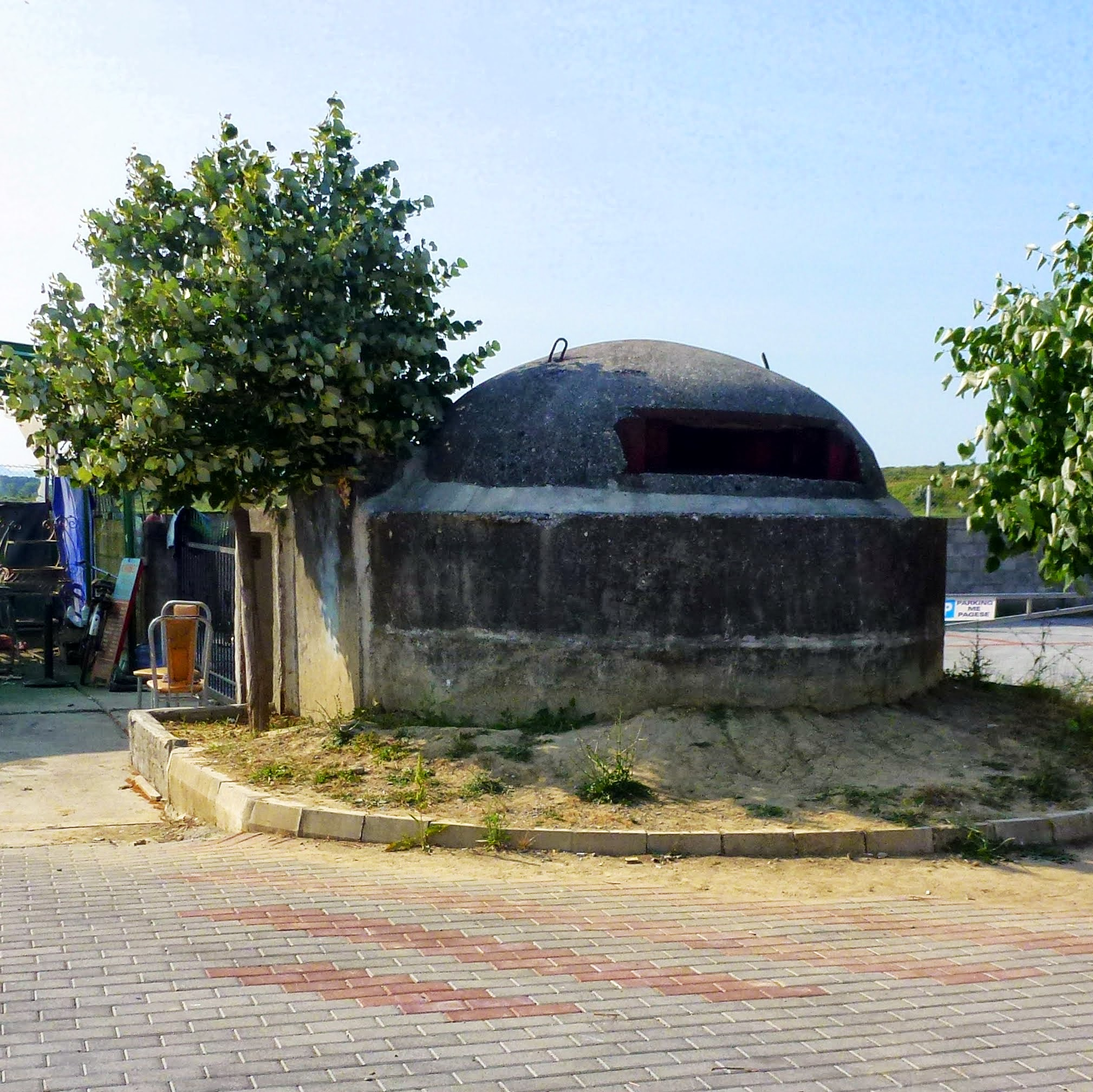
- A bunker in Muriqan on the border between Albania and Montenegro

- Location within Albania
- Coordinates: 42°0′54″N 19°24′11″E
- Country: Albania
- County: Shkodër
- Municipality: Shkodër
- Administrative unit: Ana e Malit
- Time zone: UTC+1 (CET)
  - Summer (DST): UTC+2 (CEST)

Muriqan is a settlement in the former Ana e Malit municipality, Shkodër County, northwestern Albania. At the 2015 local government reform it became part of the municipality Shkodër. Near this village a jointly managed border crossing point with Montenegro is situated.
