= Letaj =

Letaj may refer to:

- Letaj, Croatia, a village
- Elvis Letaj (born 2003), Croatian footballer

== See also ==
- Letai, a surname
