= Nikël =

- Administrative unit
- Location within Albania
- Coordinates: 41°27′N 19°45′E
- Country: Albania
- County: Durrës
- Municipality: Krujë
  - Administrative unit: 46.21 km^{2} (17.84 sq mi)

Population (2023)
  - Administrative unit: 8,344
  - Administrative unit density: 180.6/km^{2} (467.7/sq mi)
- Time zone: UTC+1 (CET)
  - Summer (DST): UTC+2 (CEST)

Nikël is a village and a former municipality in the Durrës County, western Albania. At the 2015 local government reform it became a subdivision of the municipality Krujë. The population as of the 2023 census was 8,344.

Historical population
Year	Pop.	±%
1989	6,547	—
2001	8,929	+36.4%
2011	9,518	+6.6%
2023	8,344	−12.3%
