= Velabisht =

- Administrative unit
- Location within Albania
- Coordinates: 40°40′N 19°56′E
- Country: Albania
- County: Berat
- Municipality: Berat

Population (2011)
  - Administrative unit: 8,453
- Time zone: UTC+1 (CET)
  - Summer (DST): UTC+2 (CEST)

Velabisht is a village and a former municipality in Berat County, central Albania. At the 2015 local government reform, it became a subdivision of the municipality Berat. According to a 2011 census, the population of the village was 8,453. An old Ottoman bridge is located inside the village.
