= Tomin =

Antiquated Spanish unit of weight and currency

The tomín (plural tomines, abbreviated t) is an antiquated Spanish unit of weight and currency. It was equivalent to one-eighth of a peso, both in currency and weight, and derived from the Arabic term tomn ("one eighth").
