= Ballaban =

- Administrative unit
- Location within Albania
- Coordinates: 40°25′N 20°8′E
- Country: Albania
- County: Gjirokastër
- Municipality: Këlcyrë

Population (2011)
  - Administrative unit: 1,047
- Time zone: UTC+1 (CET)
  - Summer (DST): UTC+2 (CEST)

Ballaban is a village and a former municipality in the Gjirokastër County, southern Albania. At the 2015 local government reform it became a subdivision of the municipality Këlcyrë. The population at the 2011 census was 1,047. The municipality consists of the villages Ballaban, Vinokash, Vinokash Fushë, Komarak, Mazhar, Kondas, Psar, Ball, Kajcë, Pavar, Toshkëz, Bubës 1, Bubës 2 and Beqaraj.
