= Pajovë =

- Administrative unit
- Location within Albania
- Coordinates: 41°4′N 19°50′E
- Country: Albania
- County: Elbasan
- Municipality: Peqin

Population (2011)
  - Administrative unit: 6,626
- Time zone: UTC+1 (CET)
  - Summer (DST): UTC+2 (CEST)

Pajovë is a village and a former municipality in the District, Elbasan County, central Albania. At the 2015 local government reform it became a subdivision of the municipality Peqin. The population at the 2011 census was 6,626. The municipal unit consists of the villages Pajovë, Gryksh i Madh, Bishqem, Paulesh, Bishqem Fushë, Leqit, Lazaren, Haspiraj, Hasnjok, Cengelaj, Garunje e Papërit and Cacabeze.
