= Muhurr =

- Administrative unit
- Location within Albania
- Coordinates: 41°41′N 20°20′E
- Country: Albania
- County: Dibër
- Municipality: Dibër

Population (2011)
  - Administrative unit: 2,780
- Time zone: UTC+1 (CET)
  - Summer (DST): UTC+2 (CEST)

Muhurr is a village and a former municipality in the Dibër County, northeastern Albania. At the 2015 local government reform it became a subdivision of the municipality Dibër. The population at the 2011 census was 2,780.

== Demographic history ==
Muhurr (Muhur) appears in the Ottoman defter of 1467 as a settlement in the vilayet of Lower Dibra. The village had a total of 18 households which were represented by the following household heads: Pop Llazari, son of Gjoni; Stanisha, son of Leka; Martini, son of Gjoni; Kola, son of Nikolla; Llazari, son of Vlashi; Dimitri, son of Gjoni; Andrea, son of Llazari; Pop Mëhilli; Gjoni, son of Gjergji; Gjoni, son of Leka; Leka, son of Gjergji; Llazari, son of Dimitri; Gjoni, son of Leka; Gjini, son of Progoni; Lumsha, son of Gjoni; Todori, son of Gjoni; Gjoni, son of Mizi; and Sik Marini.
