= Bubq =

- Administrative unit
- Location within Albania
- Coordinates: 41°28′N 19°39′E
- Country: Albania
- County: Durrës
- Municipality: Krujë

Population (2011)
  - Administrative unit: 5,951
- Time zone: UTC+1 (CET)
  - Summer (DST): UTC+2 (CEST)

Bubq is a village and a former municipality in the Durrës County, western Albania. At the 2015 local government reform it became a subdivision of the municipality Krujë. The population at the 2011 census was 5,951.
