= Gjegjan =

- Administrative unit
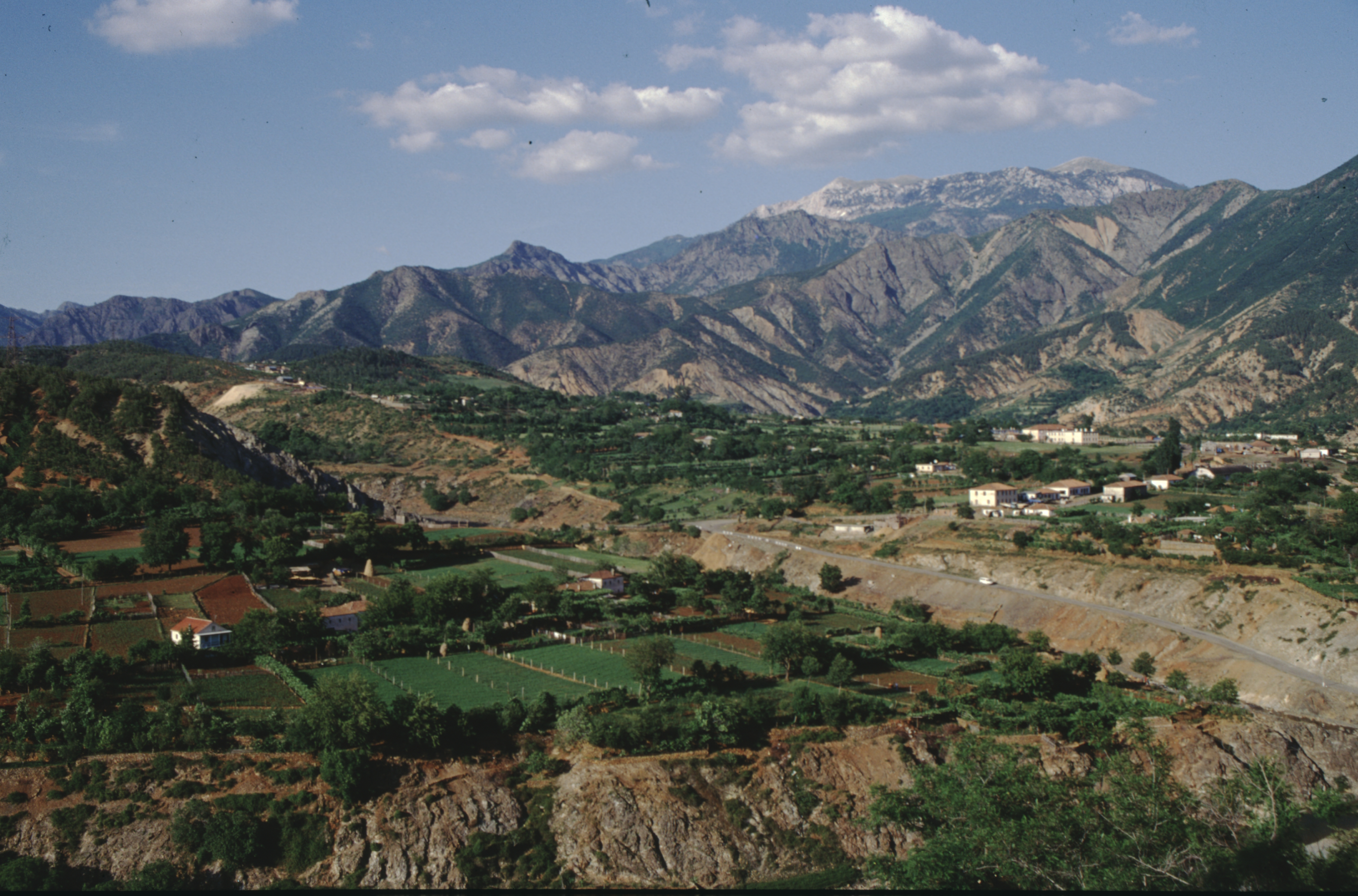
- The village in the year 2000

- Location within Albania
- Coordinates: 41°56′N 20°1′E
- Country: Albania
- County: Shkodër
- Municipality: Pukë

Population (2011)
  - Administrative unit: 2,846
- Time zone: UTC+1 (CET)
  - Summer (DST): UTC+2 (CEST)

Gjegjan is a village and a former municipality in the Shkodër County, northern Albania. At the 2015 local government reform it became a subdivision of the municipality Pukë. The population at the 2011 census was 2,846.
