= Pojan =

- Administrative unit
- Location within Albania
- Coordinates: 40°44′N 20°50′E
- Country: Albania
- County: Korçë
- Municipality: Maliq

Population (2011)
  - Administrative unit: 10,864
- Time zone: UTC+1 (CET)
  - Summer (DST): UTC+2 (CEST)
- Postal Code: 7014
- Area Code: (0)867

Pojan is a village and a former municipality in the Korçë County, southeastern Albania. At the 2015 local government reform it became a subdivision of the municipality Maliq. The population at the 2011 census was 10,864. The municipal unit consists of the villages Pojan, Zvezdë, Shëngjergj, Kreshpanj, Plasë, Zëmblak, Burimas, Pendavinj, Terovë, Rov, Orman and Rëmbec.

== Notable people ==
- Mustafa Naili Pasha, (1798–1871) was an Ottoman-Albanian statesman, who held the office of Grand Vizier during the reign of Abdülmecid I, the first time between 14 May 1853 and 29 May 1854, and the second time between 6 August 1857 and 22 October 1857.
- Orhan Pojani, (1846–1913) was a prominent figure involved in the Albanian National Awakening.
