= Cudhi =

- Administrative unit
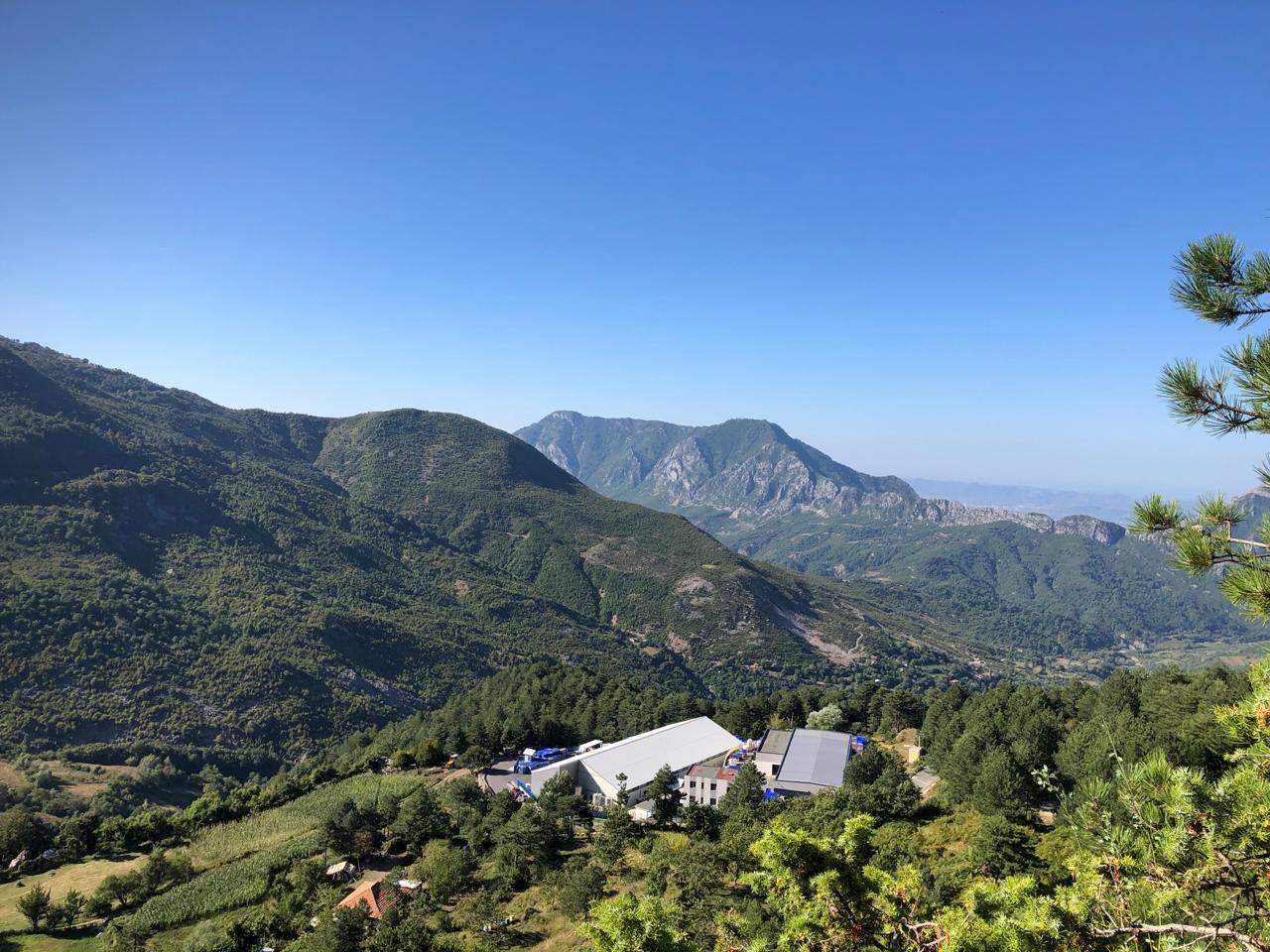
- The village of Cudhi

- Location within Albania
- Coordinates: 41°30′N 19°52′E
- Country: Albania
- County: Durrës
- Municipality: Krujë

Population (2011)
  - Total: 1,812
- Time zone: UTC+1 (CET)
  - Summer (DST): UTC+2 (CEST)

Cudhi is a former municipality in the Durrës County, western Albania. At the 2015 local government reform it became a subdivision of the municipality Krujë. The population at the 2011 census was 1,812.

== Demographic history ==
Cudhi (Çizin) appears in the Ottoman defter of 1467 as a hass-ı mir-liva property in the vilayet of Akçahisar. The settlement had a total of seven households represented by the following household heads: Martin Çataj, Dimitri Bardi, Martin Çataj, Vlad Shtjafni, Gjergj Bozhaj, Oliver Indi, and Gjon Ozguri.
