= Çlirim =

- Administrative unit
- Location within Albania
- Coordinates: 40°25′N 20°33′E
- Country: Albania
- County: Korçë
- Municipality: Kolonjë

Population (2011)
  - Total: 355
- Time zone: UTC+1 (CET)
  - Summer (DST): UTC+2 (CEST)
- Postal Code: 7406
- Area Code: (0)872

Çlirim (Albanian for "liberation") is a village and a former municipality in the Korçë County, southeastern Albania. At the 2015 local government reform it became a subdivision of the municipality Kolonjë. The population at the 2011 census was 355.

== Notable people ==
- Islam Radovicka, politician and military commander
