= Gjinar =

- Administrative unit
- Location within Albania
- Coordinates: 41°2′N 20°11′E
- Country: Albania
- County: Elbasan
- Municipality: Elbasan

Population (2011)
  - Administrative unit: 3,478
- Time zone: UTC+1 (CET)
  - Summer (DST): UTC+2 (CEST)

Gjinar is a village and a former municipality in the Elbasan County, central Albania. At the 2015 local government reform it became a subdivision of the municipality Elbasan. The population at the 2011 census was 3,478. The municipal unit consists of the villages Lleshan, Gjinar, Valesh, Pashtresh, Derstile, Llukan, Sterstan, Xibresh, Maskarth, Kaferr and Pobrat. It is part of the Shpati mountainous area, and a touristic destination. It is near a massive pine forest. It is known for weekly bazaar days.

50% of the area's population engage in agriculture, the rest of the economic activity is mainly focused on livestock and medicinal plants.

Every Thursday in center of Gjinar takes place bazaar day. There you can buy fresh products from villages nearby that comes to sell products.

The etymology of the village Gjinar comes from the name Gjin which is of Albanian origin. This suggests the village had an Albanian founder.
