= Zvezdë =

Coordinates: 40°43′50″N 20°51′45″E

Zvezda or Zvezdë is a village in the municipality of Pojan, a subdivision of the municipality of Maliq, in the Korçë County of Albania. Located in south-east Albania, it is within close range of Lake Prespa, which is shared between Albania, North Macedonia and Greece.

== Etymology ==
The name of the village comes from the Slavic word for star, which is derived from Proto-Slavic *gvězda, from Proto-Balto-Slavic *gwaizdāˀ / *źwaizdāˀ (*gwaiźdāˀ / *źwaiźdāˀ?), from Proto-Indo-European. The placename would have originated between the years 600-1370, when the Slavs migrated into or ruled Albania, or it may have been named by Bulgarians, as a small minority living nearby the region.

== History ==
The name of the village being of Slavic origin shows that Slavs may have founded the village or at least given its name; when this happened is unclear. Possibly Bulgarians gave it its name, as they lived nearby this region as a minority, or from one of the times the Slavs ruled or migrated into Albania between the years 600–1370. For example, during the Slavic migrations to the Balkans, the First Bulgarian Empire, the Second Bulgarian Empire or the Serbian Empire.

Zvezda Castle is a cultural heritage monument in Zvezda. This monument was approved with the number "1886" on 10 June 1973, showing it was built in 1886. There is a Mosque built in Zvezda, originally from the Ottoman era, but refurbished since.

== Demographics ==
The population is mostly Albanian by ethnicity; they speak the southern Tosk dialect of the Albanian language. The Mosque in Zvezda shows that the population includes Muslim inhabitants.
