= Letai =

Letai is a surname. Notable people with the surname include:

- Anthony Letai, American cancer researcher and oncologist
- Julie Letai (born 2000), American short track speed skater

== See also ==
- Letaj (disambiguation)
