= Selishtë =

Village and administrative unit in Dibër County, Albania

- Administrative unit
- Location within Albania
- Coordinates: 41°37′N 20°16′E
- Country: Albania
- County: Dibër
- Municipality: Dibër

Population (2011)
  - Administrative unit: 1,605
- Time zone: UTC+1 (CET)
  - Summer (DST): UTC+2 (CEST)

Selishtë is a village and a former municipality in the Dibër County, northeastern Albania. At the 2015 local government reform it became a subdivision of the municipality Dibër. The population at the 2011 census was 1,605. The municipal unit consists of the villages Selishtë, Kacni, Lukan, Murrë, Qafë-Murrë and Selishtë e Sipërme. The toponym is Slavic (Selište).

A rudimentary chrome mine functions in the village. It makes the headlines occasionally due to the death of miners in accidents.
