= Kajan =

- Administrative unit
- Location within Albania
- Coordinates: 40°55′N 19°53′E
- Country: Albania
- County: Elbasan
- Municipality: Belsh

Population (2011)
  - Administrative unit: 3,925
- Time zone: UTC+1 (CET)
  - Summer (DST): UTC+2 (CEST)

Kajan is a village and a former municipality in the Elbasan County, central Albania. At the 2015 local government reform it became a subdivision of the municipality Belsh. The population at the 2011 census was 3,925. The municipal unit consists of the villages Dragot-Fushë, Lisaj, Kajan, Dragot, Gjinuk, Gjolene, Turbull, Çestije, Merhoj and Idriz.
