= Baz, Albania =

Baz
- Administrative unit
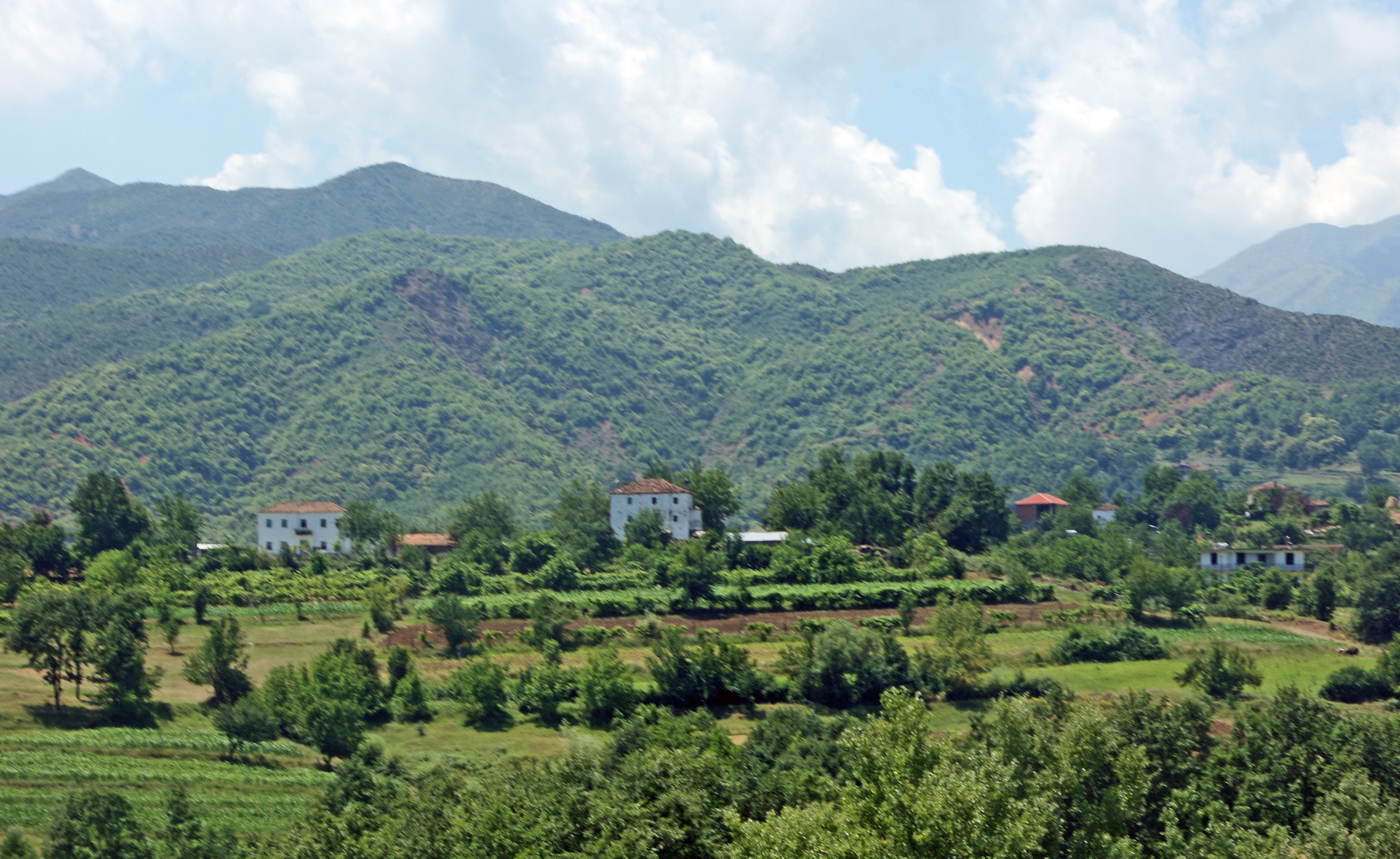

- Location within Albania
- Coordinates: 41°38′N 19°56′E
- Country: Albania
- County: Dibër
- Municipality: Mat

Population (2011)
  - Administrative unit: 2,228
- Time zone: UTC+1 (CET)
  - Summer (DST): UTC+2 (CEST)

Baz is a village and a former municipality in the Dibër County, northern Albania. At the 2015 local government reform it became a subdivision of the municipality Mat. The population at the 2011 census was 2,228.

== Demographic history ==
Baz (Bazëda) is recorded in the Ottoman defter of 1467 as a settlement belonging to the timar of the local Albanians Kali Gjergji, Gjonima, Gjergji, and Todori in the vilayet of Mati. The village had a total of six households represented by the following household heads: Andrija Kimiza, Uksiç Bardi, Lazar Muzaka, Tole Skura, Peber Kimiza, and Kaznish .
