= Labinot-Fushë =

- Administrative unit
- Location within Albania
- Coordinates: 41°8′N 20°8′E
- Country: Albania
- County: Elbasan
- Municipality: Elbasan

Population (2011)
  - Administrative unit: 7,058
- Time zone: UTC+1 (CET)
  - Summer (DST): UTC+2 (CEST)

Labinot-Fushë is a village and a former municipality in the Elbasan County, central Albania. At the 2015 local government reform it became a subdivision of the municipality Elbasan. The population at the 2011 census was 7,058. The municipal unit consists of the villages Labinot-Fushë, Godolesh, Griqan i Sipërm, Griqan i Poshtëm, Xibrake and Mengel.
