= Tregan =

- Administrative unit
- Location within Albania
- Coordinates: 41°2′N 20°4′E
- Country: Albania
- County: Elbasan
- Municipality: Elbasan

Population (2011)
  - Administrative unit: 3,036
- Time zone: UTC+1 (CET)
  - Summer (DST): UTC+2 (CEST)

Tregan is a village and a former municipality in the Elbasan County, central Albania. At the 2015 local government reform it became a subdivision of the municipality Elbasan. The population at the 2011 census was 3,036. The municipal unit consists of the villages Blerimas, Bizhdan, Çikallesh, Gurisht, Kaçivel, Kyçyk, Muçan, Shinavlash, Shilbater, Trepsenisht, Tudan and Tregan. A small inhabited place in this village is called Cekrezi, which is the Albanian name for Circassians. Circassians would have inhabited this region after the Circassian genocide. Since then they are either fully assimilated into Albanians or have migrated else where.
