= Shalës =

- Administrative unit
- Location within Albania
- Coordinates: 41°0′N 19°57′E
- Country: Albania
- County: Elbasan
- Municipality: Cërrik

Population (2011)
  - Administrative unit: 3,842
- Time zone: UTC+1 (CET)
  - Summer (DST): UTC+2 (CEST)

Shalës is a village and a former municipality in the Elbasan County, central Albania. At the 2015 local government reform it became a subdivision of the municipality Cërrik. The population at the 2011 census was 3,842. The municipal unit consists of the villages Shalës, Licaj, Kurtalli, Xibrake, Xherie and Kodras. Its geographical coordinates are 40° 59' 55" North, 19° 56' 52" East.
