= Afrim =

Afrim is a male given name of Albanian origin. In Albanian it means “Approach” or "Dawn".

Notable people with this name include:

- Afrim Bilal, Turkish basketball player
- Afrim Kuci, Kosovar football player
- Afrim Takioglu, Greek football player
- Afrim Tolias (born 1970), Greek actor
- Afrim Tovërlani, Kosovar football player

== See also ==
- AFRIMS, Armed Forces Research Institute of Medical Sciences
