= Shirgjan =

- Administrative unit
- Location within Albania
- Coordinates: 41°3′N 20°3′E
- Country: Albania
- County: Elbasan
- Municipality: Elbasan

Population (2011)
  - Administrative unit: 7,307
- Time zone: UTC+1 (CET)
  - Summer (DST): UTC+2 (CEST)

Shirgjan is a village and a former municipality in the Elbasan County, central Albania. At the 2015 local government reform it became a subdivision of the municipality Elbasan. The population at the 2011 census was 7,307. The municipal unit consists of the villages Bathes, Bujqes, Jagodine, Kuqan, Kryezjarr, Mjekes and Shirgjan.
