= Tërpan =

- Administrative unit
- Location within Albania
- Coordinates: 40°33′20″N 20°01′37″E
- Country: Albania
- County: Berat
- Municipality: Poliçan

Population (2011)
  - Administrative unit: 1,716
- Time zone: UTC+1 (CET)
  - Summer (DST): UTC+2 (CEST)

Tërpan is a village and a former municipality in Berat County, central Albania. At the 2015 local government reform it became a subdivision of the municipality Poliçan. The population at the 2011 census was 1,716.
