= Maminas =

- Administrative unit
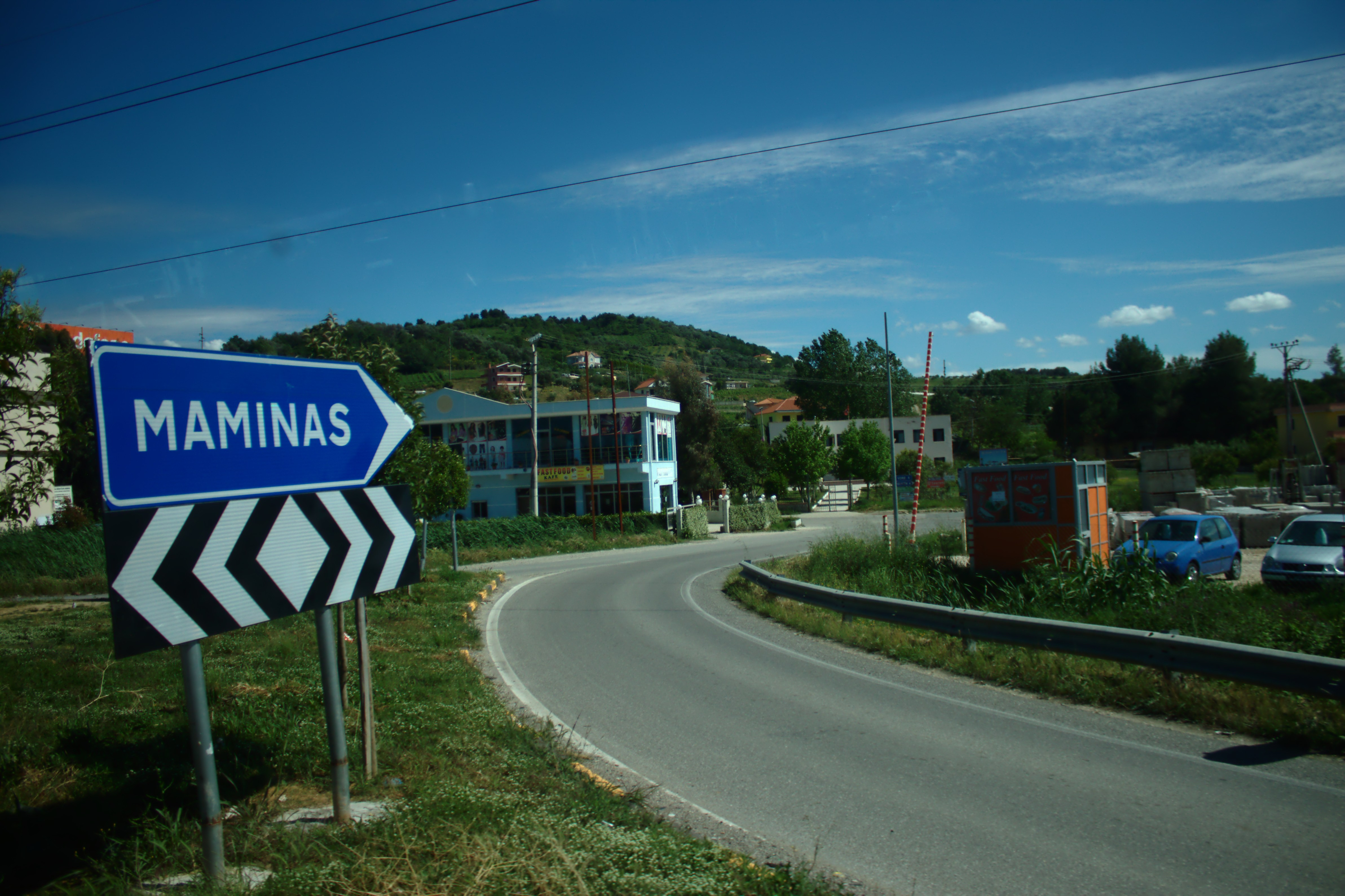
- Maminas village

- Location within Albania
- Coordinates: 41°23′N 19°36′E
- Country: Albania
- County: Durrës
- Municipality: Shijak
- Elevation: 30 m (98 ft)

Population (2015)
  - Administrative unit: 8,868
- Time zone: UTC+1 (CET)
  - Summer (DST): UTC+2 (CEST)

Maminas is a village and a former municipality in the Durrës County, western Albania. At the 2015 local government reform it became a subdivision of the municipality Shijak. The population at the 2011 census was 8868.
