= Communes of Albania =

Third-level administrative divisions of Albania

Administrative units of Albania
- The 373 administrative units of Albania
- Category: Unitary state
- Location: Republic of Albania
- Created: June 2015
- Number: 373
- Government: Administrative unit government Municipality government County government National government
- Subdivisions: Villages

Communes (Albanian: komuna or komunat), officially known as administrative units (njësi administrative or njësitë administrative) or units of local administration, government, or governance (njësi të qeverisjes vendore or njësitë të qeverisjes vendore) since 2015, are the 373 third-level administrative divisions of Albania which serve as its local government. There are 12 counties and 61 municipalities above the administrative units and 2,972 villages below them.

== History ==
The current division of Albania in 373 administrative units was enacted in 2014 and carried out in June 2015.

Albania has adjusted its internal organization 21 times since its Declaration of Independence from the Ottoman Empire in 1912. Immediately prior to the most recent reforms, the 308 or 309 communes were rural municipalities which served as second-level divisions of the country outside of its cities. They now serve as the level of local government across the country, each under the authority of the nearest urban center and each overseeing any nearby villages. Because of their intermediate status between the cities and villages, the communes are also sometimes known in English translation as towns.

== List of administrative units by county ==
=== Berat County ===
Berat County has 20 communes and 241 villages.

- Bogovë, with 9 villages
- Çepan, with 14 villages
- Gjerbes, with 14 villages
- Kozare, with 11 villages
- Leshnjë, with 8 villages
- Perondi, with 7 villages
- Potom, with 12 villages
- Roshnik, with 13 villages
- Sinjë, with 14 villages
- Tërpan, with 14 villages
- Vendreshë, with 10 villages
- Vërtop, with 11 villages
- Zhepë, with 16 villages
- Cukalat, with 6 villages
- Kutalli, with 10 villages
- Lumas, with 13 villages
- Otllak, with 10 villages
- Poshnje, with 12 villages
- Qendër, with 24 villages
- Velabisht, with 13 villages

=== Dibër County ===
Dibër County has 32 communes and 280 villages.

- Arras, with 9 villages
- Baz, with 5 villages
- Derjan, with 7 villages
- Fushë-Bulqizë, with 4 villages
- Gjoricë, with 6 villages
- Gurrë, with 6 villages
- Kala e Dodës, with 8 villages
- Kastriot, with 15 villages
- Klos, with 14 villages
- Komsi, with 10 villages
- Lis, with 7 villages
- Lurë, with 10 villages
- Luzni, with 6 villages
- Maqellarë, with 22 villages
- Melan, with 12 villages
- Muhurr, with 7 villages
- Ostren, with 13 villages
- Rukaj, with 6 villages
- Selishtë, with 6 villages
- Shupenzë, with 12 villages
- Sllovë, with 10 villages
- Suç, with 5 villages
- Tomin, with 14 villages
- Trebisht, with 6 villages
- Ulëz, with 6 villages
- Xibër, with 6 villages
- Zerqan, with 13 villages
- Fushë-Çidhën, with 4 villages
- Martanesh, with 8 villages
- Zall-Dardhë, with 9 villages
- Zall-Reç, with 9 villages

=== Durrës County ===
Durrës County has 10 communes and 108 villages.

- Bubq, with 7 villages
- Nikël, with 9 villages
- Kodër-Thumanë, with 9 villages
- Xhafzotaj, with 7 villages
- Çudhi, with 10 villages
- Gjepalaj, with 9 villages
- Ishëm, with 9 villages
- Katund i Ri, with 9 villages
- Maminas, with 8 villages
- Rrashbull, with 8 villages

The remaining 23 villages belong to the following municipalities: Sukth (6), Manëz (8), Krujë (3) dhe Fushë-Krujë (6).

=== Elbasan County ===
Elbasan County has 45 communes and 385 villages.

- Gjocaj, with 9 villages
- Karinë, with 7 villages
- Kodovjat, with 12 villages
- Kukur, with 10 villages
- Kushovë, with 8 villages
- Lenie, with 6 villages
- Orenje, with 10 villages
- Pajovë, with 12 villages
- Përparim, with 14 villages
- Pishaj, with 20 villages
- Poroçan, with 5 villages
- Qendër, with 12 villages
- Qukës, with 11 villages
- Rrajcë, with 7 villages
- Shezë, with 7 villages
- Skënderbegas, with 13 villages
- Stravaj, with 6 villages
- Sult, with 9 villages
- Tunjë, with 12 villages
- Bradashesh, with 17 villages
- Fierzë, with 4 villages
- Funarë, with 9 villages
- Gjergjan, with 7 villages
- Gjinar, with 11 villages
- Gostimë, with 6 villages
- Gracen, with 9 villages
- Grekan, with 4 villages
- Hotolisht, with 7 villages
- Kajan, with 10 villages
- Klos, with 8 villages
- Labinot-Fushë, with 6 villages
- Labinot-Mal, with 10 villages
- Lunik, with 7 villages
- Mollas, with 6 villages
- Papër, with 13 villages
- Polis, with 6 villages
- Rrasë, with 4 villages
- Shalës, with 6 villages
- Shirgjan, with 7 villages
- Shushicë, with 9 villages
- Steblevë, with 7 villages
- Tregan, with 13 villages
- Zavalinë, with 6 villages

=== Fier County ===
Fier County has 37 communes and 269 villages.

- Frakull, with 8 villages
- Allkaj, with 8 villages
- Aranitas, with 6 villages
- Ballagat, with 7 villages
- Bubullime, with 7 villages
- Cakran, with 12 villages
- Dërmenas, with 12 villages
- Divjakë, with 10 villages
- Dushk, with 7 villages
- Fier-Shegan, with 13 villages
- Fratar, with 6 villages
- Golem, with 6 villages
- Grabjan, with 3 villages
- Gradishtë, with 9 villages
- Greshicë, with 2 villages
- Hekal, with 4 villages
- Hysgjokaj, with 5 villages
- Karbunarë, with 10 villages
- Kolonjë, with 9 villages
- Krutje, with 11 villages
- Kuman, with 4 villages
- Kurjan, with 4 villages
- Kutë, with 4 villages
- Levan, with 11 villages
- Libofshë, with 11 villages
- Mbrostar, with 6 villages
- Ngraçan, with 2 villages
- Portez, with 6 villages
- Qendër, Ballsh, with 12 villages
- Qendër, Fier, with 10 villages
- Remas, with 8 villages
- Ruzhdie, with 5 villages
- Selitë, Ballsh, with 4 villages
- Strum, with 5 villages
- Tërbuf, with 7 villages
- Topojë, with 9 villages
- Zharrez, with 6 villages

=== Gjirokastër County ===
Gjirokastër County has 24 communes and 265 villages.

- Antigonë, with 5 villages
- Ballaban, with 14 villages
- Çarshovë, with 9 villages
- Cepo, with 11 villages
- Dishnicë, with 15 villages
- Dropull i Poshtëm, with 16 villages
- Dropull i Sipërm, with 18 villages
- Frashër, with 8 villages
- Krahës, with 10 villages
- Kurvelesh, with 5 villages
- Lazarat, with 2 villages
- Lopës, with 5 villages
- Luftinje, with 15 villages
- Memaliaj Fshat, with 8 villages
- Petran, with 15 villages
- Picar, with 5 villages
- Pogon, with 7 villages
- Qendër, with 38 villages
- Qesarat, with 7 villages
- Sukë, with 14 villages
- Zagori, with 10 villages

=== Korçë County ===
Korçë County has 31 communes and 340 villages.

- Barmash, with 10 villages
- Leskovik, with 14 villages
- Novoselë, with 10 villages
- Buçimas, with 8 villages
- Çërravë, with 11 villages
- Çlirim, with 12 villages
- Dardhas, with 9 villages
- Drenovë, with 8 villages
- Gorë, with 18 villages
- Hoçisht, with 10 villages
- Lekas, with 12 villages
- Libonik, with 13 villages
- Liqenas, with 9 villages
- Miras, with 16 villages
- Moglicë, with 17 villages
- Mollaj, with 5 villages
- Mollas, with 14 villages
- Pirg, with 11 villages
- Pojan, with 12 villages
- Progër, with 8 villages
- Proptisht, with 15 villages
- Qendër, Korçë, with 13 villages
- Qendër, Devoll, with 10 villages
- Qendër, Kolonjë, with 16 villages
- Trebinjë, with 15 villages
- Udënisht, with 6 villages
- Velçan, with 9 villages
- Vithkuq, with 13 villages
- Voskop, with 7 villages
- Voskopojë, with 5 villages
- Vreshtas, with 4 villages

=== Kukës County ===
Kukës County has 25 communes and 187 villages.

- Arrën, with 5 villages
- Bicaj, with 10 villages
- Bujan, with 9 villages
- Bushtricë, with 7 villages
- Bytyç, with 13 villages
- Fajzë, with 6 villages
- Fierzë, with 5 villages
- Gjinaj, with 6 villages
- Golaj, with 12 villages
- Grykë-Çajë, with 4 villages
- Kalis, with 5 villages
- Kolsh, with 3 villages
- Krumë, with 7 villages
- Lekbibaj, with 12 villages
- Llugaj, with 6 villages
- Malzi, with 12 villages
- Margegaj, with 10 villages
- Shishtavec, with 7 villages
- Shtiqën, with 4 villages
- Surroj, with 4 villages
- Topojan, with 5 villages
- Tropojë, with 15 villages
- Ujëmisht, with 7 villages
- Zapod, with 7 villages

=== Lezhë County ===
Lezhë County has 14 communes and 117 villages.

- Balldre, with 8 villages
- Blinisht, with 7 villages
- Dajç, with 7 villages
- Fan, with 17 villages
- Fushë-Kuqë, with 5 villages
- Kaçinar, with 7 villages
- Kallmet, with 4 villages
- Kolsh, with 9 villages
- Kthelle, with 9 villages
- Milot, with 14 villages
- Orosh, with 15 villages
- Selitë, with 9 villages
- Shëngjin, with 5 villages
- Shënkoll, with 7 villages
- Ungrej, with 9 villages
- Zejmen, with 7 villages

=== Shkodër County ===
Shkodër County has 28 communes and 276 villages.

- Qerret, with 12 villages
- Ana-Malit, with 10 villages
- Bërdicë, with 6 villages
- Blerim, with 7 villages
- Bushat, with 14 villages
- Dajç (Shkodër), with 11 villages
- Fierzë, with 8 villages
- Gjegjan, with 10 villages
- Gruemirë, with 15 villages
- Guri i Zi, with 11 villages
- Hajmel, with 5 villages
- Iballë, with 8 villages
- Kastrat, with 12 villages
- Kelmend, with 8 villages
- Postribë, with 11 villages
- Pult, with 7 villages
- Qafë-Mali, with 9 villages
- Qelez, with 9 villages
- Qendër, with 8 villages
- Rrapë, with 8 villages
- Rrethinat, with 10 villages
- Shalë, with 11 villages
- Shkrel, with 12 villages
- Shllak, with 7 villages
- Shosh, with 5 villages
- Temal, with 10 villages
- Velipojë, with 10 villages
- Vig-Mnele, with 3 villages

The remaining 19 villages belong to the following municipalities: Shkodra (2), Vau i Dejës (9), Koplik (3), Puka (2) dhe Fushë-Arrëza (3).

=== Tirana County ===
Tirana County has 24 communes and 219 villages.

- Golem, with 11 villages
- Gosë, with 5 villages
- Kryevidh, with 10 villages
- Baldushk, with 14 villages
- Bërxullë, with 3 villages
- Bërzhitë, with 12 villages
- Dajt, with 13 villages
- Farkë, with 6 villages
- Helmas, with 10 villages
- Kashar, with 7 villages
- Krrabë, with 3 villages
- Lekaj, with 9 villages
- Luz i Vogël, with 4 villages
- Ndroq, with 11 villages
- Paskuqan, with 8 villages
- Petrelë, with 17 villages
- Pezë, with 10 villages
- Prezë, with 7 villages
- Shëngjergj, with 12 villages
- Sinaballaj, with 9 villages
- Synej, with 7 villages
- Vaqar, with 10 villages
- Zall-Bastar, with 12 villages
- Zall-Herr, with 9 villages

=== Vlorë County ===
Vlorë County has 19 communes and 174 villages.

- Lukovë, with 9 villages
- Vergo, with 8 villages
- Aliko, with 11 villages
- Armen, with 7 villages
- Brataj, with 10 villages
- Dhivër, with 12 villages
- Finiq, with 7 villages
- Horë-Vranisht, with 5 villages
- Kotë, with 10 villages
- Ksamil, with 2 villages
- Livadhja, with 15 villages
- Markat, with 6 villages
- Mesopotam, with 15 villages
- Novoselë, with 12 villages
- Qendër, with 12 villages
- Sevaster, with 8 villages
- Shushicë, with 9 villages
- Vllahinë, with 12 villages
- Xarrë, with 4 villages

== See also ==
- Administrative divisions of Albania
- Counties of Albania
- Municipalities of Albania
- List of cities and towns in Albania
- Villages of Albania
