= Municipalities of Albania =

Second-level administrative divisions of Albania

- The 61 municipalities of Albania
- Category: Unitary state
- Location: Republic of Albania
- Number: 61
- Populations: 1,843 (Pustec) – 598,176 (Tiranë)
- Government: Municipality government County government National government
- Subdivisions: Communes

Municipalities (Albanian: bashki or bashkitë) are the second-level administrative divisions of Albania, below the counties and above the communes. Since the most recent administrative reforms in 2014, Albania has 61 municipalities.

== History ==
Municipalities are considered the basic administrative division of Albania. Since its Declaration of Independence from the Ottoman Empire in 1912, Albania has reorganized internal administration 21 times. From independence until the year 2000, regional government was organized into regions (rrethë) of varying numbers, size, and importance. They were consolidated into groups comprising 12 counties in 1991. Following the 1998 constitutional reforms, the 36 regions of the time were abolished entirely and replaced by the larger counties and two kinds of municipalities: urban municipalities (bashki) and rural ones (komuna). In 2014, this was revised to reduce the number of urban municipalities to 61 and extended their jurisdiction over the surrounding countryside to create regional administrations, while using the communes—renamed administrative units (njësitë administrative)—as a third-level division for local government. This first took effect in the 2015 local elections.

== List ==
Seal	Municipality	Units	Area	Location	Population	Mayor
Seal	Municipality	Units	Area	Location	2023	Mayor
	Belsh	Belsh, Fierzë, Grekan, Kajan, Rrasë	196.55 km^{2} (75.89 sq mi)		17,123	Arif Tafani (PS)
	Berat	Berat, Otllak, Roshnik, Sinjë, Velabisht	380.21 km^{2} (146.80 sq mi)		62,232	Ervin Demo (PS)
	Bulqizë	Bulqizë, Fushë-Bulqizë, Gjoricë, Martanesh, Ostren, Shupenzë, Trebisht, Zerqan	678.73 km^{2} (262.06 sq mi)		26,826	Festime Mjeshtri (PS)
	Cërrik	Cërrik, Gostimë, Klos, Mollas, Shalës	189.77 km^{2} (73.27 sq mi)		25,163	Andis Sala (PS)
	Delvinë	Delvinë, Vergo	183.01 km^{2} (70.66 sq mi)		6,166	Besmir Veli (PS)
	Devoll	Bilisht, Hoçisht, Miras, Progër, Qendër Bilisht	458.01 km^{2} (176.84 sq mi)		25,897	Eduard Duro (PS)
	Dibër	Arras, Fushë-Çidhën, Kala e Dodës, Kastriot, Lurë, Luzni, Maqellarë, Melan, Muhurr, Peshkopi, Selishtë, Sllovë, Tomin, Zall-Dardhë, Zall-Reç	938.65 km^{2} (362.41 sq mi)		50,775	Rahim Spahiu (PS)
	Dimal	Cukalat, Dimal, Kutalli, Poshnjë	156.65 km^{2} (60.48 sq mi)		28,135	Juliana Memaj (PS)
	Divjakë	Divjakë, Grabian, Gradishtë, Remas, Tërbuf	359.41 km^{2} (138.77 sq mi)		24,882	Josif Gorrea (PS)
	Dropull	Dropull i Poshtëm, Dropull i Sipërm, Pogon	448.45 km^{2} (173.15 sq mi)		8,259	Dhimitraq Toli (PS)
	Durrës	Durrës, Ishëm, Katund i Ri, Manëz, Rrashbull, Sukth	338.96 km^{2} (130.87 sq mi)		153,614	Emiriana Sako (PS)
	Elbasan	Bradashesh, Elbasan, Funarë, Gjergjan, Gjinar, Gracen, Labinot-Fushë, Labinot-Mal, Papër, Shirgjan, Shushicë, Tregan, Zavalinë	872.61 km^{2} (336.92 sq mi)		115,101	Gledian Llatja (PS)
	Fier	Cakran, Dërmenas, Fier, Frakull, Levan, Libofshë, Mbrostar Ura, Portëz, Qendër, Topojë	620.83 km^{2} (239.70 sq mi)		101,963	Armando Subashi (PS)
	Finiq	Aliko, Dhivër, Finiq, Livadhja, Mesopotam	444.28 km^{2} (171.54 sq mi)		11,413	Romeo Çakuli (M.E.G.A)
	Fushë-Arrëz	Blerim, Fierzë, Fushë-Arrëz, Iballë, Qafë-Mali	540.77 km^{2} (208.79 sq mi)		4,878	Hil Curri (BF)
	Gjirokastër	Antigonë, Cepo, Gjirokastër, Lazarat, Lunxhëri, Odrie, Picar	469.55 km^{2} (181.29 sq mi)		23,270	Flamur Golemi (PS)
	Gramsh	Gramsh, Kodovjat, Kukur, Kushovë, Lenie, Pishaj, Poroçan, Skënderbegas, Sult, Tunjë	739.75 km^{2} (285.62 sq mi)		16,533	Besion Ajazi (PS)
	Has	Fajzë, Gjinaj, Golaj, Krumë	400.01 km^{2} (154.44 sq mi)		11,684	Miftar Dauti (BF)
	Himarë	Himarë, Horë-Vranisht, Lukovë	572.22 km^{2} (220.94 sq mi)		8,328	Vangjel Tavo (PS)
	Kamëz	Kamëz, Paskuqan	37.20 km^{2} (14.36 sq mi)		96,137	Rakip Suli (PS)
	Kavajë	Golem, Helmas, Kavajë, Luz i Vogël, Synej	199.00 km^{2} (76.83 sq mi)		30,012	Fisnik Qosja (BF)
	Këlcyrë	Ballaban, Dishnicë, Këlcyrë, Sukë	304.86 km^{2} (117.71 sq mi)		4,400	Klement Ndoni (PS)
	Klos	Gurrë, Klos, Suç, Xibër	357.72 km^{2} (138.12 sq mi)		12,172	Valbona Kola (PS)
	Kolonjë	Barmash, Çlirim, Ersekë, Leskovik, Mollas, Novoselë, Qendër Ersekë, Qendër Leskovik	864.74 km^{2} (333.88 sq mi)		7,519	Erion Isai (PS)
	Konispol	Konispol, Markat, Xarrë	226.26 km^{2} (87.36 sq mi)		4,898	Ergest Dule (PS)
	Korçë	Drenovë, Korçë, Lekas, Mollaj, Qendër Bulgarec, Vithkuq, Voskop, Voskopojë	806.67 km^{2} (311.46 sq mi)		60,754	Sotiraq Filo (PS)
	Krujë	Bubq, Cudhi, Fushë-Krujë, Krujë, Nikël, Kodër-Thumanë	339.20 km^{2} (130.97 sq mi)		51,191	Artur Bushi (PS)
	Kuçovë	Kozare, Kuçovë, Lumas, Perondi	160.33 km^{2} (61.90 sq mi)		31,077	Kreshnik Hajdari (PS)
	Kukës	Arrën, Bicaj, Bushtricë, Grykë-Çajë, Kalis, Kolsh, Kukës, Malzi, Shishtavec, Shtiqën, Surroj, Tërthore, Topojan, Ujëmisht, Zapod	934.80 km^{2} (360.93 sq mi)		36,125	Albert Halilaj (PS)
	Kurbin	Fushë Kuqe, Laç, Mamurras, Milot	276.25 km^{2} (106.66 sq mi)		34,405	Majlinda Cara (PS)
	Lezhë	Balldren, Blinisht, Dajç, Kallmet, Kolsh, Lezhë, Shëngjin, Shënkoll, Ungrej, Zejmen	514.97 km^{2} (198.83 sq mi)		51,354	Pjerin Ndreu (PS)
	Libohovë	Libohovë, Qendër Libohovë, Zagori	248.42 km^{2} (95.92 sq mi)		2,765	Leonard Hide (PS)
	Librazhd	Hotolisht, Librazhd, Lunik, Orenjë, Polis, Qendër Librazhd, Stëblevë	793.99 km^{2} (306.56 sq mi)		23,312	Mariglen Disha (PS)
	Lushnjë	Allkaj, Ballagat, Bubullimë, Dushk, Fier-Shegan, Golem, Hysgjokaj, Karbunarë, Kolonjë, Krutje, Lushnjë	372.91 km^{2} (143.98 sq mi)		63,135	Eriselda Sefa (PS)
	Malësi e Madhe	Gruemirë, Kastrat, Kelmend, Koplik, Qendër, Shkrel	1,069.91 km^{2} (413.09 sq mi)		21,684	Tonin Marinaj (PS)
	Maliq	Gorë, Libonik, Maliq, Moglicë, Pirg, Pojan, Vreshtas	656.89 km^{2} (253.63 sq mi)		31,008	Gëzim Topçiu (PS)
	Mallakastër	Aranitas, Ballsh, Fratar, Greshicë, Hekal, Kutë, Ngraçan, Qendër Dukas, Selitë	329.37 km^{2} (127.17 sq mi)		15,838	Qerim Ismailaj (PS)
	Mat	Baz, Burrel, Derjan, Komsi, Lis, Macukull, Rukaj, Ulëz	493.81 km^{2} (190.66 sq mi)		17,405	Agron Malaj (PS)
	Memaliaj	Buz, Krahës, Luftinjë, Memaliaj, Memaliaj Fshat, Qesarat	372.30 km^{2} (143.75 sq mi)		6,578	Albert Malaj (BF)
	Mirditë	Fan, Kaçinar, Kthellë, Orosh, Rrëshen, Rubik, Selitë	870.26 km^{2} (336.01 sq mi)		13,625	Albert Mëlyshi (BF)
	Patos	Patos, Ruzhdie, Zharrëz	82.59 km^{2} (31.89 sq mi)		18,227	Fation Duro (PS)
	Peqin	Gjoçaj, Karinë, Pajovë, Peqin, Përparim, Shezë	197.90 km^{2} (76.41 sq mi)		16,580	Bukurosh Maçi (PS)
	Përmet	Çarçovë, Frashër, Përmet, Petran, Qendër Piskovë	602.47 km^{2} (232.61 sq mi)		7,980	Alma Hoxha (PS)
	Pogradec	Buçimas, Çërravë, Dardhas, Pogradec, Proptisht, Trebinjë, Udenisht, Velçan	703.37 km^{2} (271.57 sq mi)		46,070	Ilir Xhakolli (PS)
	Poliçan	Poliçan, Tërpan, Vërtop	272.20 km^{2} (105.10 sq mi)		8,762	Adriatik Zotkaj (PS)
	Prrenjas	Prrenjas, Qukës, Rrajcë, Stravaj	323.17 km^{2} (124.78 sq mi)		18,768	Nuri Belba (PS)
	Pukë	Gjegjan, Pukë, Qelëz, Qerret, Rrapë	505.83 km^{2} (195.30 sq mi)		6,222	Rrok Dodaj (BF)
	Pustec	Pustec	243.60 km^{2} (94.05 sq mi)		1,843	Pali Kolefski (PS)
	Roskovec	Kuman, Kurjan, Roskovec, Strum	118.08 km^{2} (45.59 sq mi)		16,332	Majlinda Bufi (PS)
	Rrogozhinë	Gosë, Kryevidh, Lekaj, Rrogozhinë, Sinaballaj	223.73 km^{2} (86.38 sq mi)		12,567	Edison Memolla (PS)
	Sarandë	Ksamil, Sarandë	29.12 km^{2} (11.24 sq mi)		22,613	Oltion Çaçi (PS)
	Selenicë	Armen, Brataj, Kotë, Selenicë, Sevaster, Vllahinë	561.52 km^{2} (216.80 sq mi)		9,580	Nertil Bellaj (PS)
	Shijak	Gjepalaj, Maminas, Shijak, Xhafzotaj	92.24 km^{2} (35.61 sq mi)		22,058	Elton Arbana (PS)
	Shkodër	Ana e Malit, Bërdicë, Dajç, Guri i Zi, Postribë, Pult, Rrethinat, Shalë, Shkodër, Shosh, Velipojë	911.84 km^{2} (352.06 sq mi)		102,434	Benet Beci (PS)
	Skrapar	Bogovë, Çepan, Çorovodë, Gjerbës, Leshnjë, Potom, Qendër Skrapar, Vendreshë, Zhepë	832.04 km^{2} (321.25 sq mi)		10,750	Adriatik Mema (PS)
	Tepelenë	Kurvelesh, Lopës, Qendër Tepelenë, Tepelenë	431.50 km^{2} (166.60 sq mi)		6,761	Tërmet Peçi (PS)
	Tiranë	Baldushk, Bërzhitë, Dajt, Farkë, Kashar, Krrabë, Ndroq, Petrelë, Pezë, Shëngjergj, Tiranë, Vaqarr, Zall-Bastar, Zall-Herr	1,110.68 km^{2} (428.84 sq mi)		598,176	Erion Veliaj (PS)
	Tropojë	Bajram Curri, Bujan, Bytyç, Fierzë, Lekbibaj, Llugaj, Margegaj, Tropojë	1,058.04 km^{2} (408.51 sq mi)		14,189	Rexhë Byberi (PS)
	Vau i Dejës	Bushat, Hajmel, Shllak, Temal, Vau i Dejës, Vig-Mnelë	499.35 km^{2} (192.80 sq mi)		19,261	Kristian Shkreli (PS)
	Vlorë	Novoselë, Orikum, Qendër Vlorë, Shushicë, Vlorë	647.94 km^{2} (250.17 sq mi)		83,683	Ermal Dredha (PS)
	Vorë	Bërxullë, Prezë, Vorë	82.76 km^{2} (31.95 sq mi)		21,621	Blerim Shera (PS)
—	61	373	28,748.87 km^{2} (11,100.00 sq mi)	—	2,402,113	—
