= Gramsh District =

Defunct (2000) Albanian administrative area

Gramsh District Rrethi i Gramshit
- Former district
- Coordinates: 40°50′N 20°15′E
- Country: Albania
- Dissolved: 2000
- Seat: Gramsh

Area
  - Total: 695 km^{2} (268 sq mi)

Population (2001)
  - Total: 35,723
  - Density: 51.4/km^{2} (133/sq mi)
- Time zone: UTC+1 (CET)
  - Summer (DST): UTC+2 (CEST)

Gramsh District (Albanian: Rrethi i Gramshit) was one of the 36 districts of Albania, which were dissolved in July 2000 and replaced by 12 counties. It had a population of 35,723 in 2001, and an area of 695 km^{2} (268 sq mi). It is in the centre of the country, and its capital was the town of Gramsh. The area of the former district is coextensive with the present municipality of Gramsh, which is part of Elbasan County.

== Administrative divisions ==
The district consisted of the following municipalities:

- Gramsh
- Kodovjat
- Kukur
- Kushovë
- Lënie
- Pishaj
- Poroçan
- Skënderbegas
- Sult
- Tunjë
- Shkodër
