= Guri i Topit =

Mountain in Albania

- Location within Albania

Highest point
- Elevation: 2,125 m (6,972 ft)
- Prominence: 134 m (440 ft)
- Isolation: 2.1 km (1.3 mi)
- Coordinates: 40°50′10″N 20°27′04″E

Naming
- English translation: Cannon Rock

Geography
- Country: Albania
- Region: Central Mountain Region
- Municipality: Pogradec
- Parent range: Shpat–Polis–Lenie

Geology
- Rock age: Mesozoic
- Mountain type: mountain
- Rock type(s): limestone, flysch

Guri i Topit (lit. 'Cannon Rock') is a mountain located on the border between the municipalities of Gramsh and Pogradec, in eastern Albania. Standing at a height of 2,125 m (6,972 ft), it is bordered by Valamara in the south and Guri i Zi in the northwest.

== Geology ==
The mountain is primarily composed of effusive rocks and Mesozoic limestone, as well as flysch, and features a scaly structure. It has an undulating ridge with glacial landforms – above 1,700 m (5,600 ft) – represented by valleys, cirques, moraines and glacial lakes. Several branches of the Devoll river originate on the western slope, while branches of the Shkumbin originate from the eastern side.

Vegetation consists mostly of beech, pine forests and alpine pastures.

== See also ==
- List of mountains in Albania
