= Guri i Zi =

Mountain in Albania

- Location within Albania

Highest point
- Elevation: 2,072 m (6,798 ft)
- Prominence: 384 m (1,260 ft)
- Isolation: 10.6 km (6.6 mi)
- Coordinates: 40°55′04″N 20°23′02″E

Naming
- English translation: Black Rock

Geography
- Country: Albania
- Region: Central Mountain Region
- Municipality: Elbasan
- Parent range: Shpat–Polis–Lenie

Geology
- Mountain type: mountain
- Rock type: ultrabasic rock

Guri i Zi (lit. 'Black Rock') is a mountain in lower central Albania, located south of the Shpat–Polisi–Lenie range, near the border between Gramsh and Pogradec municipalities. Its highest summit, which bears the same name, rises to an elevation of 2,072 m (6,798 ft) above sea level.

== Geology ==
Extending south of Polisi, toward the upper course of Zalli i Shpellës stream, the mountain is composed primarily of ultrabasic rocks. Its terrain is rugged and highly dissected, with steep slopes evident on the western flank. Relief features are evident due to deep erosional incision by the Holta Canyon.

Geomorphological contrasts occur along tectonic boundaries between flysch deposits and ultrabasic formations, particularly in the Upper Poroçan area. These contact zones are characterized by horizontal fragmentation and relief energy. The ridge of Guri i Zi forms a plateau-like crest.

Evidence of Quaternary glaciation is widespread. Both sides of the mountain have been reshaped by glacial processes, resulting in landforms such as Cirques (simple and compound, some containing glacial lakes), shallow trough valleys and glacial shoulders, generally found above elevations of 1,800 meters.

Guri i Zi functions as a watershed where several tributaries originate and flow into the river systems of Devoll and Shkumbin.

== See also ==
- List of mountains in Albania
