= Bratilë =

- Village
- Location within Albania
- Coordinates: 40°46′17″N 20°19′22″E
- Country: Albania
- County: Elbasan
- Municipality: Gramsh
- Administrative unit: Kodovjat
- Time zone: UTC+1 (CET)
  - Summer (DST): UTC+2 (CEST)

Bratilë is a community in the Elbasan County, central Albania. At the 2015 local government reform it became part of the municipality Gramsh. The place is notable for a suggested power plant to be built on the river Devoll, which flows along the settlement.
