= Valamara =

Mountain in Albania

- Mali i Valamarës
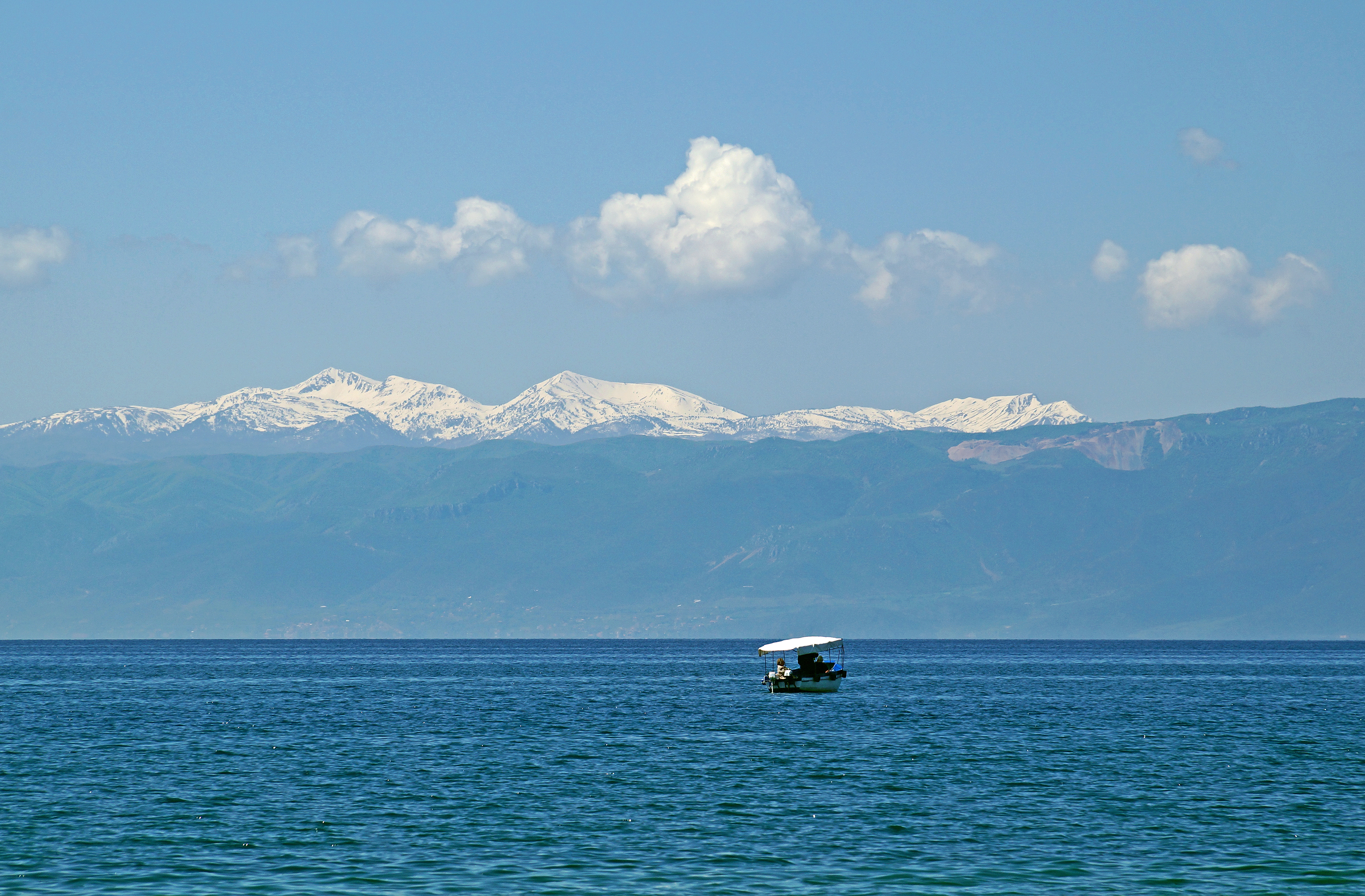
- View of the massif seen from Lake Ohrid

Highest point
- Elevation: 2,373 m (7,785 ft)
- Prominence: 1,525 m (5,003 ft)
- Isolation: 26.5 km (16.5 mi)
- Listing: Ultra, Ribu
- Coordinates: 40°47′36″N 20°27′53″E

Geography
- Location within Albania
- Country: Albania
- Region: Central Mountain Region
- Municipality: Korçë, Gramsh, Pogradec
- Parent range: Shpat–Polis–Lenie

Geology
- Mountain type: massif
- Rock type: ultrabasic rock

Valamara is a massif located in eastern Albania. Converging on the borders between Korçë, Gramsh and Pogradec municipalities, it rises at a height of 2,373 m (7,785 ft). The northern boundary is marked by Guri i Topit (2,125 m) and the southern limit by Lenie (2,013 m).

== Geology ==
The massif is predominantly composed of ultrabasic rocks. Its terrain features various glacial landforms with numerous glacial lakes, seven of which can be found above 1,600 m (5,200 ft). The eastern slopes give rise to the Shkumbin river, while the western and southeastern slopes are traversed by the Devoll river.

== Biodiversity ==
Valamara is a population hotspot for the critically endangered Balkan lynx.

Vegetation consists of beech and pine forests covering the lower regions and rich summer pastures flourishing in the upper regions.

== See also ==
- List of mountains in Albania
