= Gjyral =

- Village
- Location in Albania
- Coordinates: 40°57′45″N 19°58′19″E
- Country: Albania
- County: Elbasan
- Municipality: Cërrik
- Administrative Unit: Gostimë

Area
  - Total: 0.91 km^{2} (0.35 sq mi)
- Elevation: 126 m (413 ft)
- Time zone: UTC+1 (CET)
- Postal code: 3018

Gjyral is a village in Gostimë Administrative Unit, Cërrik Municipality, Elbasan County, Albania. As of 2025, A main road runs through Gjyral, along with twelve smaller roads, and the village has hundreds of buildings, including a supermarket, two bars, two restaurants, a school, a hospital and a baby shop - along with a small lake. The village has existed since 3rd century BC, as evidenced by the discovery of a Hermes bust in the village and it has hot summer Mediterranean climate Köppen climate classification.
