= Dumre, Albania =

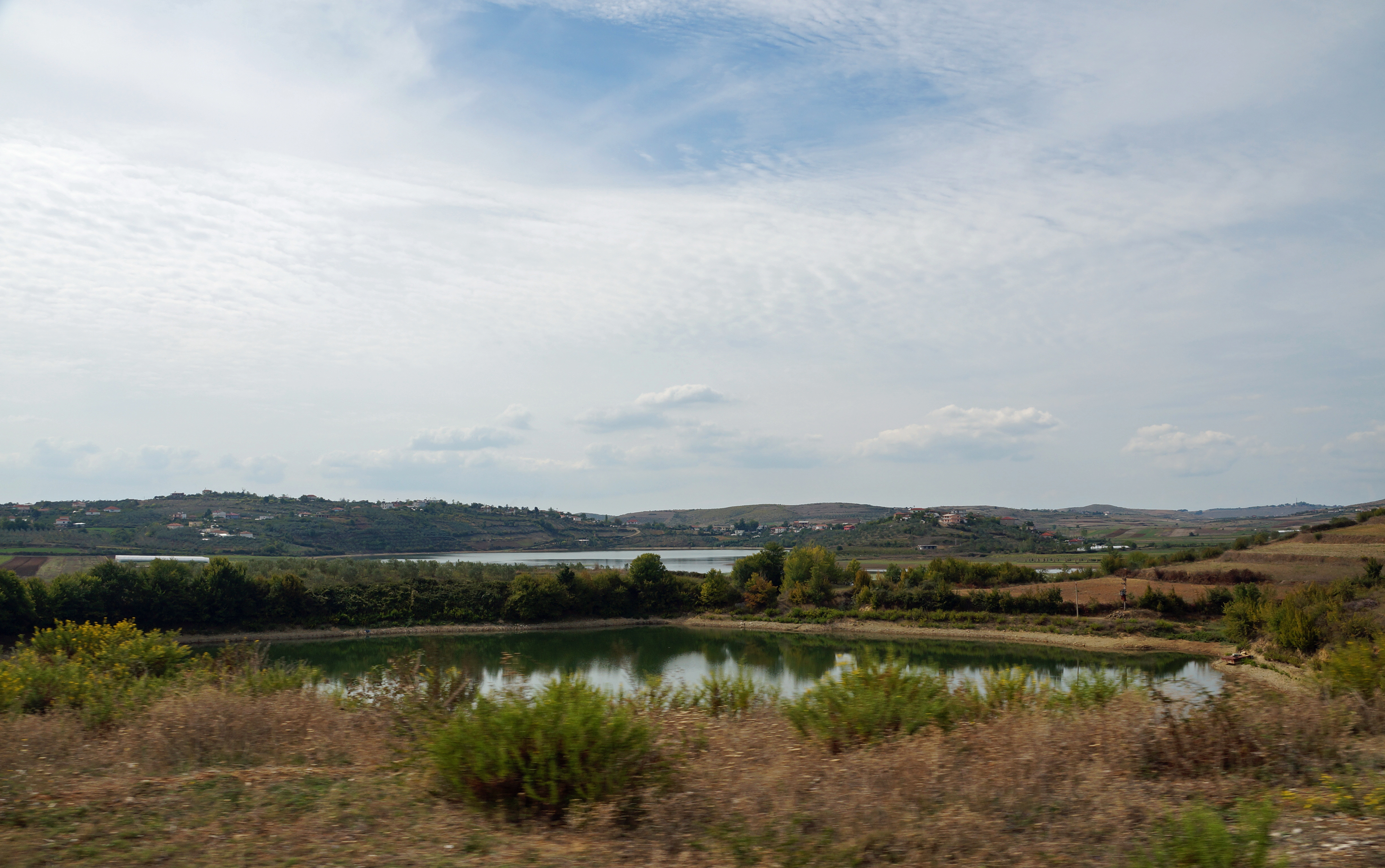
The Dumre landscape

Dumre or Dumreja is a plateau and region in Central Albania, south of Elbasan. It has an area of 215 km^{2}. Dumre has 85 lakes. Its main settlement is Belsh.

The Dumreja, a karst landscape rich in deposits of Diapir evaporite, is located between the Shkumbin River in the north, the Devoll River in the east, the Seman River in the south and the Myzeqe Plain in the west. The area is characterised by hills, poljes and sinkholes that rise up to 300 m, and even up to 450 m in the far north. Around 80 small karst lakes were formed in up to 15 m deep depressions.
