= Grabovë e Sipërme =

Grabovë e Sipërme Greãva, Grabuva
- Village
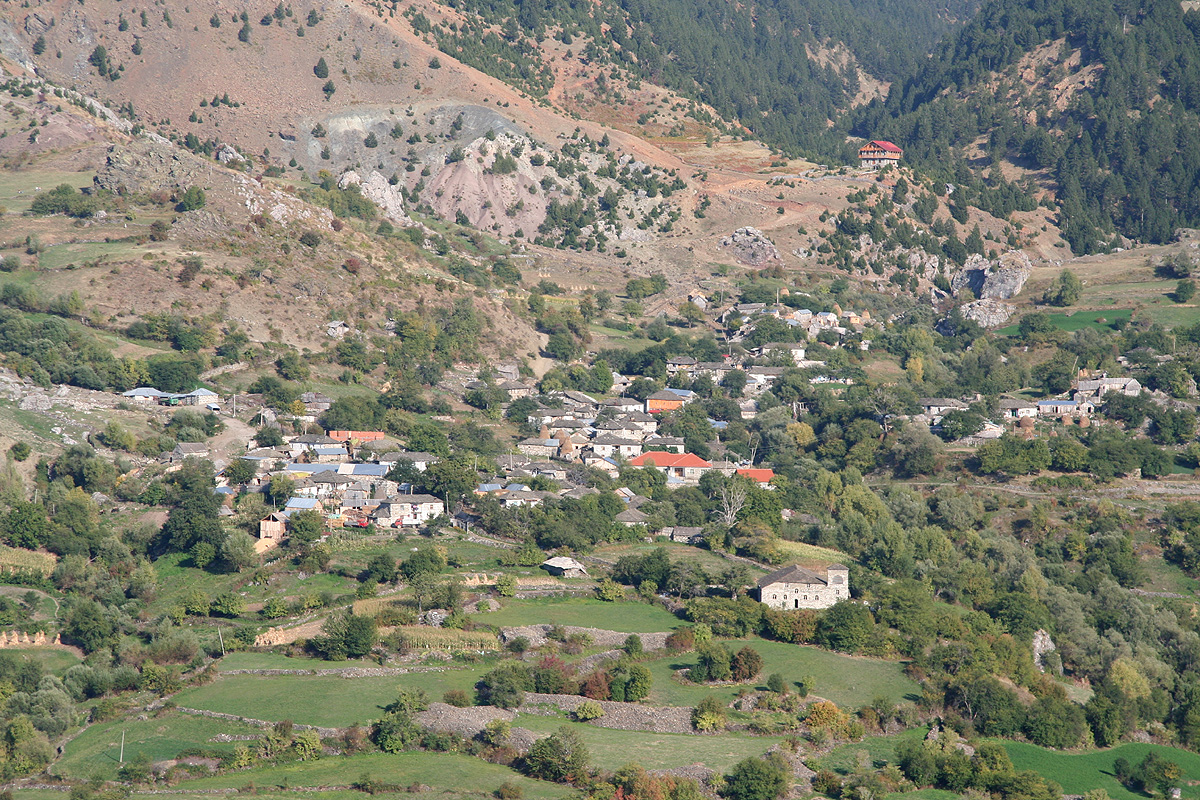
- Grabova seen from Shkembi Kopacit

- Location within Albania
- Coordinates: 40°47′43″N 20°24′31″E
- Country: Albania
- County: Elbasan
- Municipality: Gramsh
- Administrative unit: Lenie
- Elevation: 1,250 m (4,100 ft)
- Time zone: UTC+1 (CET)
  - Summer (DST): UTC+2 (CEST)

Grabovë e Sipërme (also: Grabova; Aromanian: Greãva, Grabuva) is a village in Albania inhabited by Aromanians. The village is located in the former municipality of Lenie. At the 2015 local government reform it became part of the municipality Gramsh.

== History ==
Grabova was a medieval town created in the 10th century. Aromanians have left Grabova on several occasions, although the village has never been completely deserted. The first wave of depopulation took place in the 17th century, when Grabova shared the fate of Moscopole and during the inter-war period, starting with 1931, many of Grabovars emigrated to Elbasan and Lushnjë. In 1933, 15 families from the village emigrated to Romania; they initially settled in Southern Dobruja and then, in 1940, in the village of Nisipari, Constanța County, from where they moved to the larger nearby towns (Medgidia, Ovidiu, Constanta). Another important immigration began in 1950, when communist authorities used the craftsmen from Grabova to build the industrial units in Korçë, Pogradec, Gramsh, Elbasan, and Tirana.

In the 18th century the Grabovë Church was built in the village. Owing to its past the town has another 18th century church: the church of Saint Paraskeva (Aromanian: Stãvinere) built in 1718, and the school of Simon Baba.

== Most common names in Grabova ==
=== Family names ===
Bardhi, Buzo, Cyco, Canuti, Nishku, Trushi, Thano, Verushi.

=== Male names ===
Theodhor (Dhori), Andoni, Kristo, Dhimo, Jani, Jorgji, Llambi, Dhionis, Pandeli, Piro, Spiro, Sotir (Sotiraqi), Themistokli, Thoma, Vangjeli, etc.

=== Female names ===
Dhimitra, Margarita, Maria, Naunka, Parashqevi, Thomaidha, Violeta (Violta)

== Notable people originated from Grabova ==
- Andrei Șaguna, Metropolitan bishop of the Romanian Orthodox Church
- Cyril of Bulgaria, the first Patriarch of the restored Bulgarian Patriarchate
- Lika Yanko, Bulgarian painter
- Çetiri family of painters, icon painters active in central and southern Albania
