= Grabovë Church =

Church in Elbasan County, Albania

St. Nicholas Church in Grabovë
- Kisha e Shën Kollit (Albanian)
- Location within Albania
- 40°47′37″N 20°24′33″E
- Location: Grabovë e Sipërme, Gramsh District, Elbasan County, Albania

History
- Built: 18th century

Cultural Monument of Albania
- Type: Architectural
- Criteria: I
- Designated: February 15, 2005
- Part of: Under protection
- Reference no.: GR010

Grabovë Church (Albanian: Kisha e Grabovës) is an Orthodox church dedicated to Saint Nicholas (the church is thus also known as the St. Nicholas Church; Albanian: Kisha e Shën Kollit; Aromanian: Bãsearica Ayiu Nicola) in Grabovë e Sipërme, Elbasan County, Albania. It is a Cultural Monument of Albania.

== History ==
Built in the 18th century, the church follows the pattern of many Eastern Orthodox churches with its east-west axis. The main entrance is from the south, and the entire church is around 25 metres (82 ft) by 20 metres (66 ft). The masonry uses local stone and the roof is covered in roof tiles typical of the area. The church features a main nave by the entrance and both an outer nave to the south and a narthex to the west. Painted wooden friezes decorate the ceiling, include an original fresco above the main gate of 1 metre (3.3 ft) by 2 metres (6.6 ft). The floor is built from stone slabs. Worshipers and other area residents are buried in and around the structure.
