= Floq, Cërrik =

Floq
- Village
- Location within Albania
- Coordinates: 40°57′N 20°4′E
- Country: Albania
- County: Elbasan
- Municipality: Cërrik
- Administrative unit: Klos
- Time zone: UTC+1 (CET)
  - Summer (DST): UTC+2 (CEST)

Floq is a village in the former municipality of Klos, Elbasan County, central Albania. At the 2015 local government reform it became part of the municipality Cërrik.

Floq contains vast amount of land which its residents use for produce such as grapes, corn, wheat, apple, plumb, cherry & fig trees, along with other various produce. The main product in Floq is the traditional Raki and Wine which is locally produced and sold on to third party. Over the last few years residents have started to sell the grape produce directly to clients instead of producing Raki and Wine themselves to reduce their expenses.

Road

At the beginning of June preparations were being made to re-construct the road between the village up to the main road leading through Trunc to Gostime with asphalt. Currently the road is being completed and there is not current projected completed date; however, it will likely be in August or September.
