= Lenie, Albania =

Lenie Stãvinerea
- Administrative unit
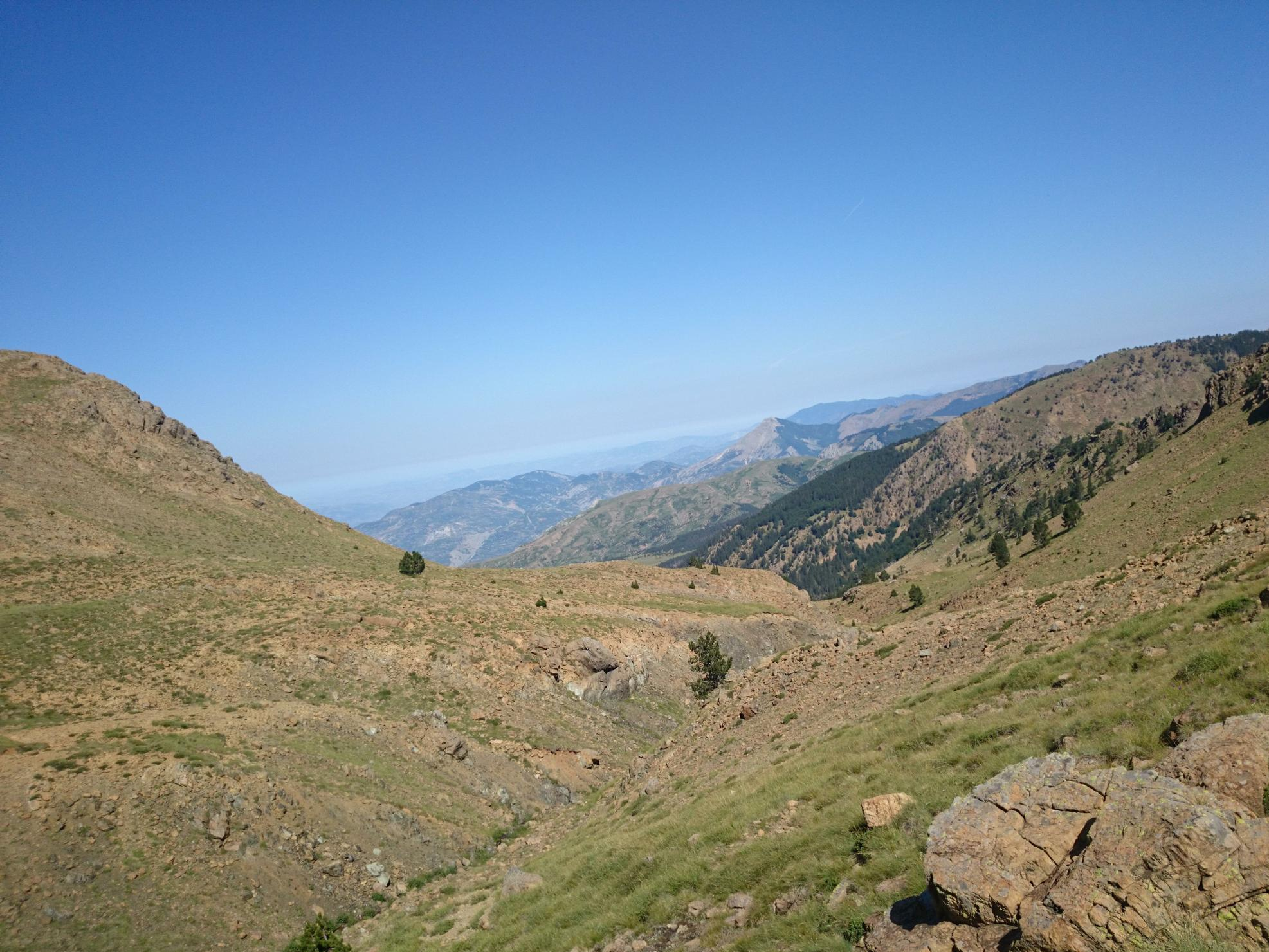
- View of mountains in Lenie

- Location within Albania
- Coordinates: 40°46′N 20°23′E
- Country: Albania
- County: Elbasan
- Municipality: Gramsh

Population (2011)
  - Administrative unit: 779
- Time zone: UTC+1 (CET)
  - Summer (DST): UTC+2 (CEST)

Lenie (Aromanian: Stãvinerea) is a village and a former municipality in the Elbasan County, in central Albania. At the 2015 local government reform it became a subdivision of the municipality Gramsh. The population at the 2011 census was 779. It comprises six villages:

- Shënepremte (Aromanian: Stãvinerea), the center of the commune, also known as Lenie
- Bicaj
- Kuratë
- Grabovë e Poshtme
- Grabovë e Sipërme (Aromanian: Greãva, Grabuva)
- Valth (Tarragjin)

== Geography ==
The commune is the southeasternmost one of Elbasan County. It is surrounded by mountains, whereas the stream of Grabova, flowing east to west from Valamara mountain, into Devoll river, divides the area in two parts. To the north the commune borders with Komjan mountain, in the south lies Sogor mountain (1,952 m (6,404 ft)), to the east it borders with Valamara mountain and to the southeast with Lenia mountain. The whole region slopes gradually down to the Devoll valley in the western part. Archaeological evidences tell the region was inhabited from ancient times. It is possible to visit the ruins of a medieval castle of the 14th century.
