= St. Nicholas Church, Shelcan =

Cultural monument in Albania

St. Nicholas Church
- Kisha e Shën Kollit (Albanian)
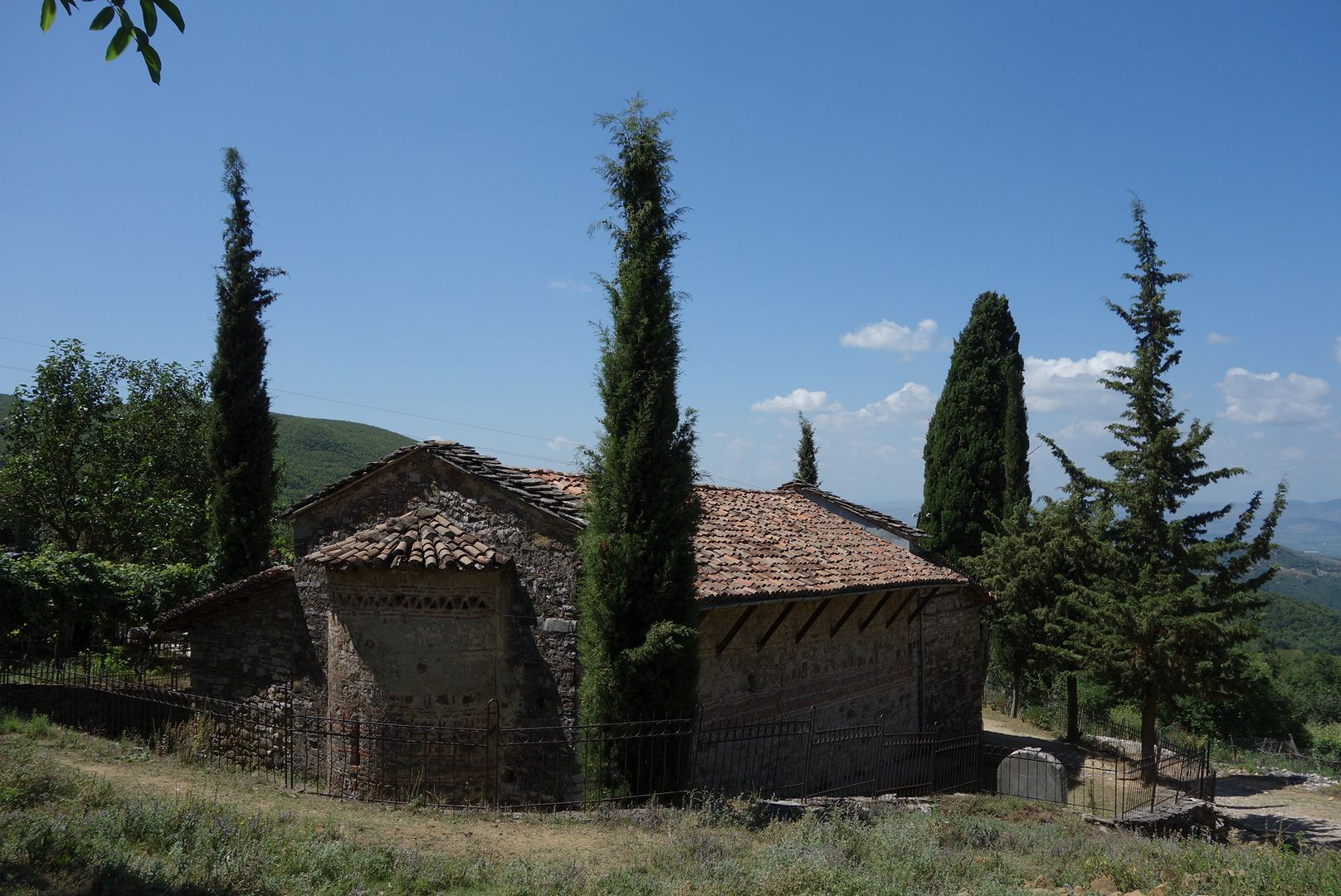
- Interactive map of St. Nicholas Church
- 41.06113°N 20.13434°E
- Location: Shelcan

Cultural Monument of Albania

St. Nicholas Church (Albanian: Kisha e Shën Kollit) is an Albanian Orthodox church in Shelcan, Elbasan County, Albania. Its interior is completely covered with frescoes by Onufri. It became a Cultural Monument of Albania in 1948.
