= Blerimas =

Blerimas may refer the following places in Albania:

- Blerimas, Elbasan
- Blerimas, Vlorë
