= Jáva =

Weekly newspaper published in Pristina, Kosovo

Jáva is a weekly newspaper published in Pristina, Kosovo by author Migjen Kelmendi. On May 9, 2006, the organization Reporters Without Borders awarded the paper its Signal for Europe Press Freedom Award for the year.

== Gheg dialect ==
Unusual among Kosovar papers, it is published in Gheg Albanian. Linguistic analysis is a frequent topic of discussion in Jáva. Indeed, Kelmendi was a major critic of the 1972 language reform that standardized written Albanian, under what he alleged to be political pressure, along the lines of the Tosk dialect spoken south of the Shkumbin River.

== Kosovar identity ==
Many articles have been published in this paper on the identity of Kosovo Albanians. Highlights were published in November 2005 in a collection entitled Kush asht Kosovari ("Who Is a Kosovar?").
