= Nexhip Vinçani =

Major General of the Albanian Army

- Born: 10 August 1916; Vinçan
- Died: 6 March 1997 (aged 80); Tirana
- Spouse: Mamika
- Military career
- Branch: land
- Service years: 1941–1958
- Rank: Major general
- Commands: Commander of the 4th Assault Brigade of the National Liberation Army
- Conflicts: World War II: Battle of Tirana (1944)

Nexhip Vinçani (10 August 1916 – 6 March 1997) was an Albanian Major General and Deputy Chief of the General Staff of the Albanian Army.

== Biography ==
He was the son of Kahreman Vinçani. After completing primary school in his hometown, he studied at the French high school in Korçë, the gymnasium in Shkodra, and then at the Royal Military School in Tirana. The Italian invasion of Albania found Vinçani in Rome, where he was studying law at the local university. In 1941, he interrupted his studies and returned to Albania to join one of the resistance movement units. In 1942, he organized partisan units in the Korçë district together with his brothers. In 1943, he became the commander of the Korçë District in the National Liberation Army. After the reorganization of partisan units in August 1943, he became the commander of the 4th Assault Brigade. In late 1943 and early 1944, faced with the threat of the brigade's liquidation, Vinçani, with the consent of the command, moved his units to the Skrapar region. He fought in the eastern part of the country, was wounded in the Battle of Pogradec, and from September 1944 participated in the Battle of Tirana.

After the communists came to power, Vinçani was promoted to the rank of Major General and commanded a division stationed in Peshkopi. Soon after, he was sent to study at the Woroshylov General Staff Academy in Moscow. Upon his return, he became the Deputy Chief of the General Staff, and in 1956, he assumed the position of Coastal Defense Commander. In 1958, he was arrested and demoted, then forced to work on draining marshes near Fier. In 1982, he was declared an enemy of the people, sentenced to a year in prison, and later interned near Gramsh. After the fall of communism, he was active in veteran organizations and was the initiator of the United Organization of Veterans of the National Liberation Army. He died in Tirana.

He was married to Mamika. Posthumously awarded the Order of Nderi i Kombit (Honor of the Nation). A street in Korçë bears Vinçani's name.

== Bibliography ==
- Halili, Kujtim (2006). Fjalor biografik ushtarak. Tirana. p. 178. ISBN 99943-849-2-9.
