= Shmil =

- Village
- Location within Albania
- Coordinates: 41°14′44″N 20°9′35″E
- Country: Albania
- County: Elbasan
- Municipality: Elbasan
- Administrative unit: Labinot-Mal
- Time zone: UTC+1 (CET)
  - Summer (DST): UTC+2 (CEST)

Shmil is a village in Elbasan County, eastern Albania.

Shmil (Shëmill) is attested in the Ottoman defter of 1467 as a settlement in the vilayet of Çermeniça. It had a total of 42 households Following the local government reform of 2015, Shmil became a part of the municipality of Elbasan and is under the municipal unit of Labinot-Mal.
