= Mali i Lenies =

Mountain in Albania

Lenie
- Mali i Lenies
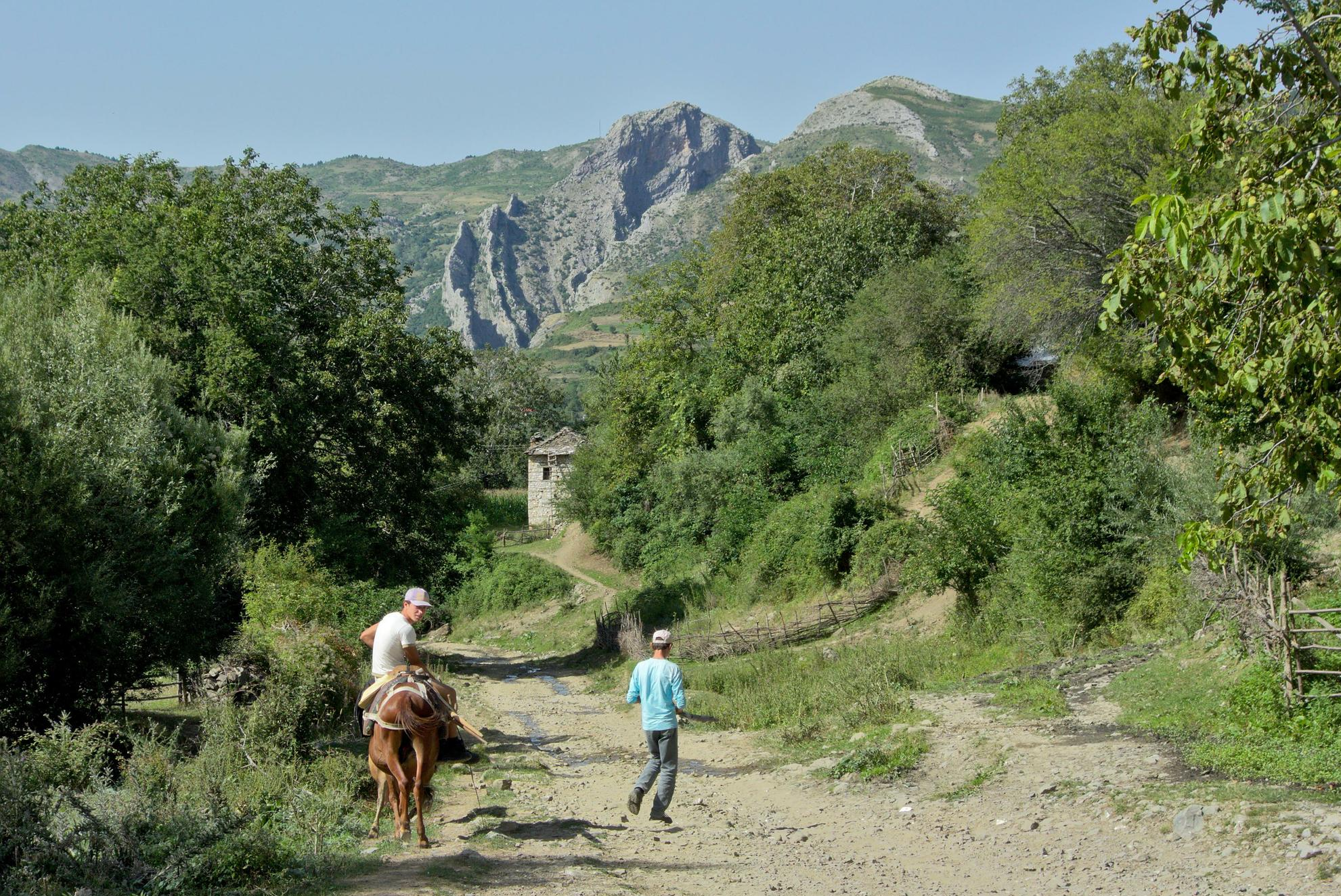

Highest point
- Elevation: 2,013 m (6,604 ft)
- Prominence: 185 m (607 ft)
- Isolation: 1.9 km (1.2 mi)
- Coordinates: 40°44′56″N 20°26′17″E

Geography
- Location within Albania
- Country: Albania
- Region: Central Mountain Region
- Municipality: Maliq, Gramsh
- Parent range: Shpat–Polis–Lenie

Geology
- Rock age(s): Late Cretaceous, Paleogene
- Mountain type: massif
- Rock type(s): limestone, ultrabasic rock

Lenie is a massif in southeastern Albania, located along the boundary between the municipalities of Maliq and Gramsh. Rising to an elevation of 2,013 m (6,604 ft) above sea level, it forms part of the Shpat–Polis–Lenie mountain range.

== Geology ==
Lenie lies between the elevated limestone massifs of Valamara and the Devoll basin, creating a transitional landscape between mountainous and valley environments.

The mountain is structured around three ridges aligned east–west, separated by gravitational faulting.

Its upper sections are composed mainly of Late Cretaceous limestone, while the lower elevations consist largely of Paleogene flysch deposits. The prevalence of limestone has enabled the development of extensive karst features, both above and below ground.

At elevations exceeding 1,700 meters (5,577 ft), glacial elements are present, attesting to the effects of Quaternary glaciation on the highest layers of the mountain.

In the lower hypsometric zone (450–1,000 meters), denudational processes are widespread. The flysch formations in this belt are particularly susceptible to erosion and slope instability.

== Moglicë landslide ==
In the spring of 1977, a major landslide occurred on the southern slope of Lenie. Known as the Moglicë landslide, it destroyed much of the nearby village of Moglicë. The event has been classified as a complex-type mass movement. Contributing factors included clay-rich strata, high levels of water saturation, active river erosion, degraded vegetation cover and unstable geological conditions.

== Biodiversity ==
Vegetation on Lenie is generally sparse at higher elevations, where alpine and subalpine pastures dominate. Forested zones consist mainly of beech, oak and Macedonian pine (Pinus peuce).

The mountain’s forests provide habitat for various wildlife species, including the brown bear (Ursus arctos), which inhabits the more remote wooded areas.

== See also ==
- List of mountains in Albania
