= Rrasë =

- Administrative unit
- Location within Albania
- Coordinates: 40°58′N 19°49′E
- Country: Albania
- County: Elbasan
- Municipality: Belsh

Population (2011)
  - Administrative unit: 1,594
- Time zone: UTC+1 (CET)
  - Summer (DST): UTC+2 (CEST)

Rrasë is a former municipality in the Elbasan County, central Albania. At the 2015 local government reform it became a subdivision of the municipality Belsh. The population at the 2011 census was 1,594. The municipal unit consists of the villages Shegas, Rrasë e Sipërme, Guri i Bardhë and Rrasë e Poshtme.

== See also ==
- Guri i Bardhë
