= Moglicë Hydro Power Plant =

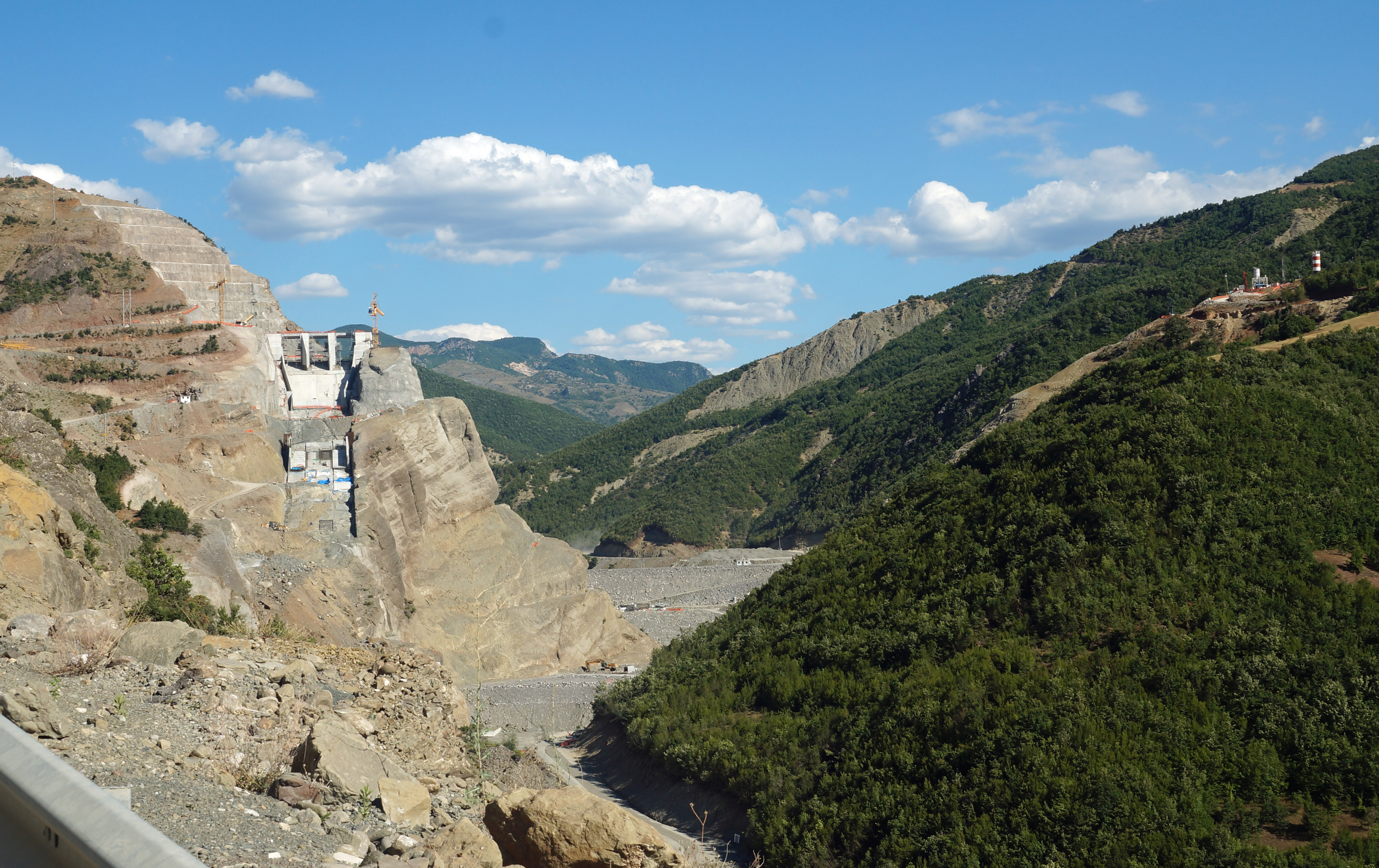

- Location within Albania
- Country: Albania
- Location: Moglicë
- Coordinates: 40.69°N 20.44°E
- Status: Under construction
- Construction began: 2013
- Opening date: 2020
- Owner: Devoll Hydropower

Dam and spillways
- Impounds: Devoll
- Height: 150 m (490 ft)
- Length: 320 m (1,050 ft)

Reservoir
- Total capacity: 360,000,000 m^{3} (290,000 acre⋅ft)
- Surface area: 7.2 km^{2} (2.8 mi^{2})

Power Station
- Hydraulic head: 300 m (980 ft)
- Turbines: 2 x 90.2 MW Francis-type
- Installed capacity: 197 MW
- Annual generation: 475 GWh est.

Moglicë Hydro Power Plant is a large hydroelectricity plant on the river Devoll situated near the village Moglicë, Albania. The project consists of a large power plant with an installed capacity of 197 MW and an average annual production of 475 GWh. It was built by Devoll Hydropower, an Albanian company owned by Norwegian power company Statkraft. The asphalt-core rock-fill dam is 320 m long, 150 m high and 460 m wide. The dam is anticipated to be the world's highest of its kind upon completion. The reservoir has a surface area of 7.2 km^{2}, and a storage capacity of about 380 million m^{3}. The power plant is part of the Devoll Hydropower Project and construction on it began in June 2013. Main structures of dam were completed in June 2019. Commercial operations were started in June 2020.

== Construction ==
=== Pumped hydro ===
Statkraft has announced a plan for pumped-storage hydroelectricity, which will use the Moglicë Hydro Power Plant's reservoir as the lower reservoir and a new upper reservoir, creating an opportunity for a reverse pump. Construction is predicted to begin in 2025 and to finish in 2030. Its capacity will be 1.2 GW and the storage capacity of the reservoir will be 28Gwh.

== Gallery ==
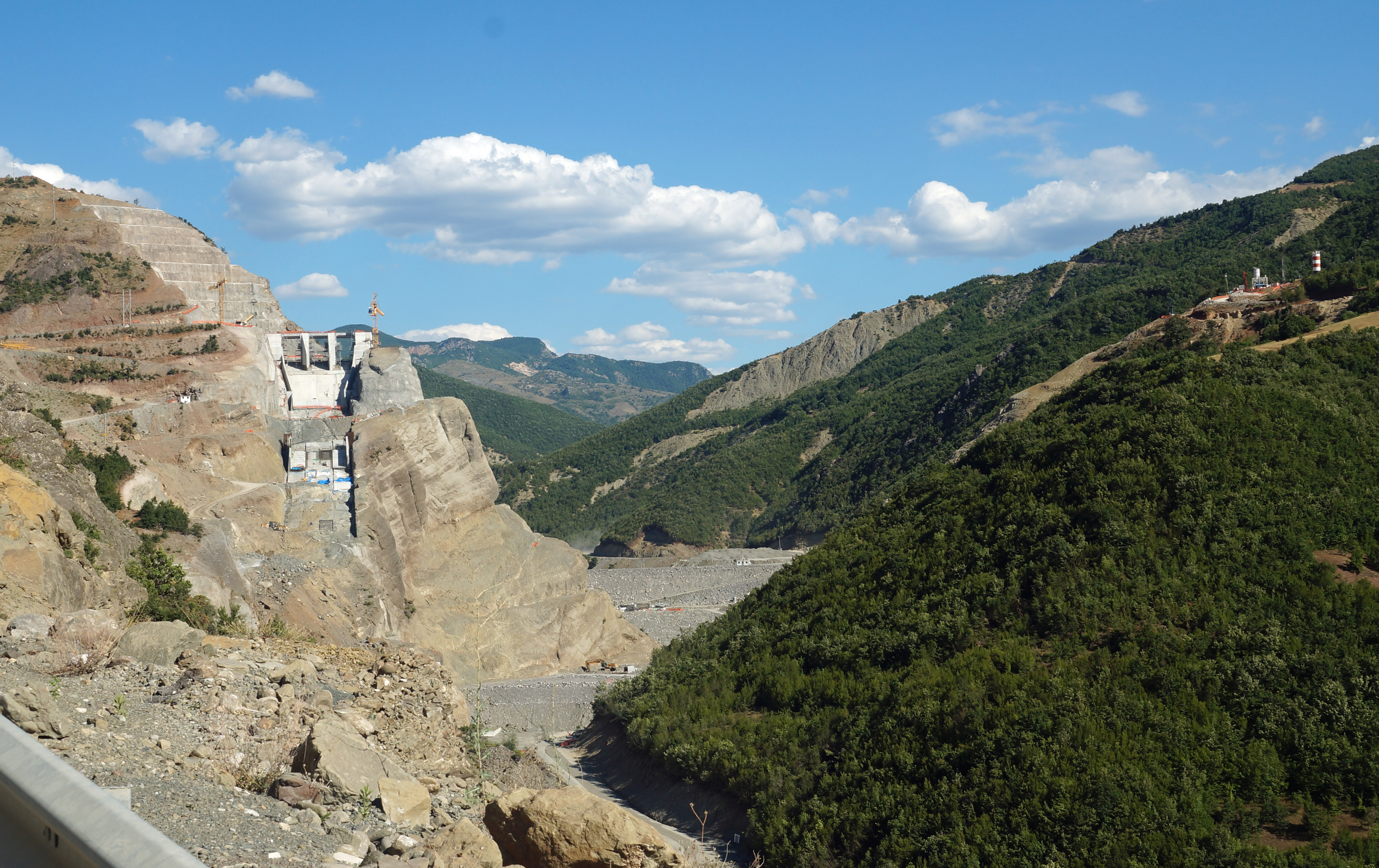
Construction of the dam in 2017
