= Cërrik =

Municipality in Albania

- Municipality and town
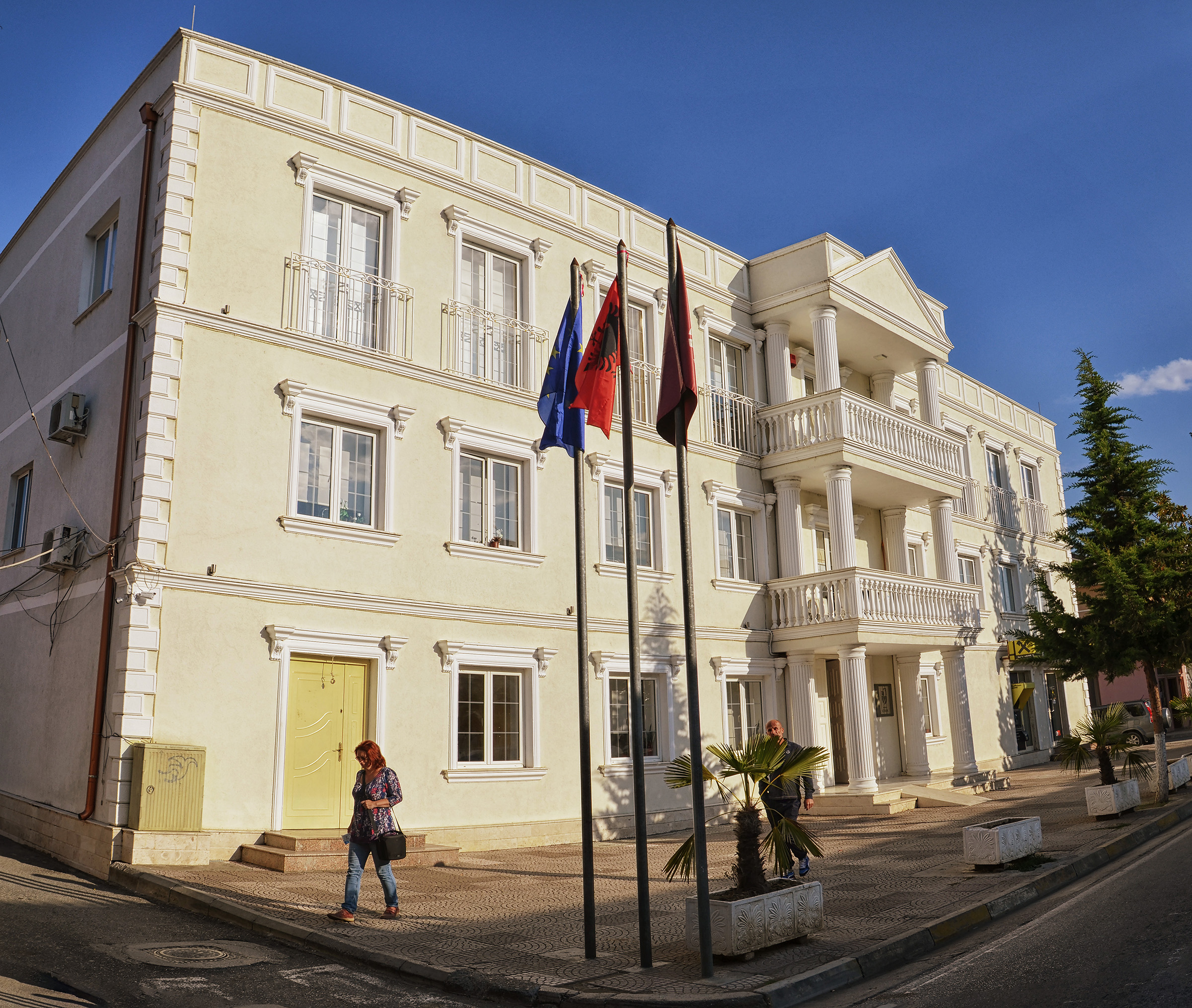
- Town Hall of Cërrik

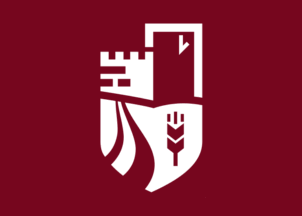
- Flag Seal

- Location within Albania Location within Europe
- Coordinates: 41°2′N 19°59′E
- Country: Albania
- Region: Central Albania
- County: Elbasan

Government
  - Type: Mayor–council
  - Mayor: Florenc Doka (PS)
  - Council: Cërrik Municipal Council

Area
  - Municipality: 189.65 km^{2} (73.22 sq mi)
- Elevation: 85 m (279 ft)

Population (2023)
  - Municipality: 25,163 (Note: The municipality of Cërrik consists of the administrative units of Gostimë, Klos, Mollas, Shalës and Cërrik. The population of the municipality results from the sum of the listed administrative units in the former as of the 2011 Albanian census.)
  - Municipality density: 144.71/km^{2} (374.8/sq mi)
  - Administrative unit: 7,001
- Time zone: UTC+1 (CET)
  - Summer (DST): UTC+2 (CEST)
- Postal code: 3007
- Area code: (0)581
- Website: www.bashkiacerrik.gov.al

Cërrik (pronounced [tsəˈrik]; Albanian definite form: Cërriku [tsəˈriku]) is a municipality in Elbasan County, central Albania. The municipality consists of the administrative units of Gostimë, Klos, Mollas, Shalës with Cërrik constituting its seat. As of the 2023 census, the population of the municipal unit is 7,001 and 25,163 in Cërrik Municipality.

Historical population
Year	Pop.	±%
1989	10,487	—
2001	9,406	−10.3%
2011	6,695	−28.8%
2023	7,001	+4.6%

== Geography ==
Cërrik is located between the Shkumbin River and Devoll River in central Albania.

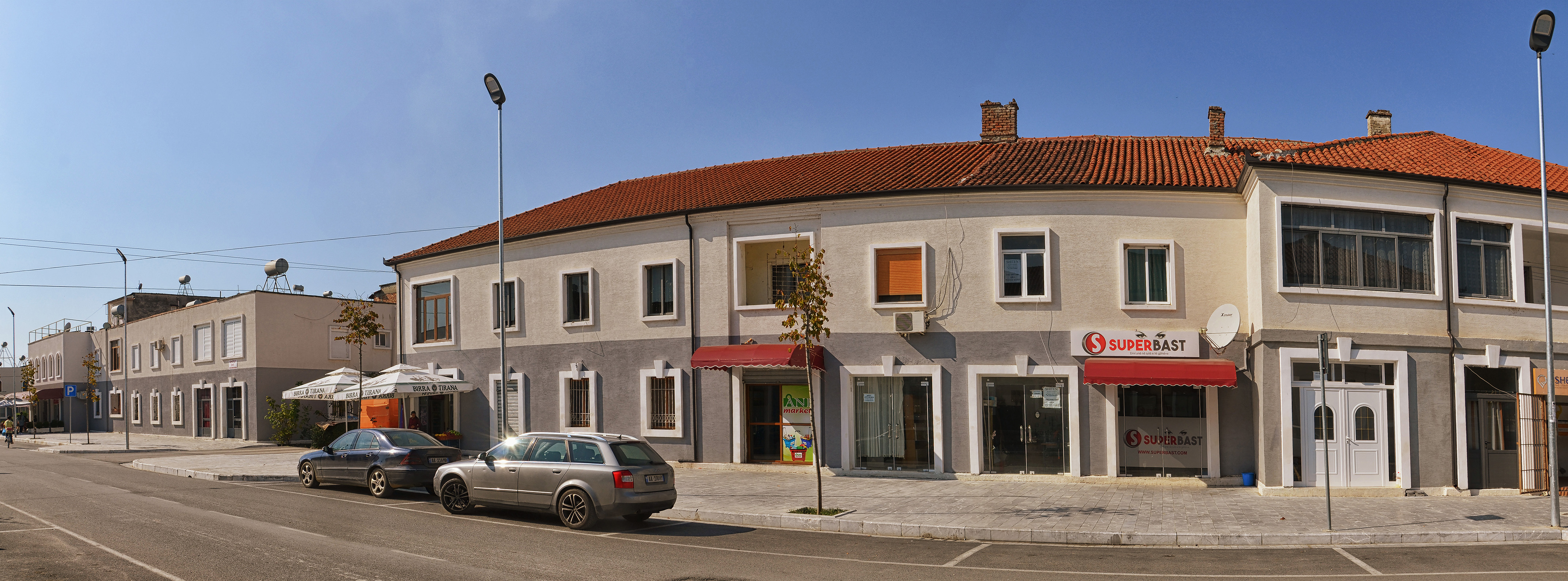
A panoramic view of the Jorgji Dilo Boulevard.

== Economy ==
Cërrik developed around an oil refinery, which began construction in 1952 and started operation on 8 November 1956. The refinery was established by Simon Ranxha, Leonard Mitrushi, Bahri Hazizi, Hysen Voci, Dhimiter Toska, Jorgji Calja, Filip Gega, Lavdosh Hametaj, Vasip Gura, Shefqet Lole, Alush Rexho, and Ibrahim Gjevori. It initially processed 500 tons of crude oil per day. In 1957, its refining capacity increased to 800 tons per day. In 1961, the plant was renovated, increasing its processing capacity to 1500 tons daily. The plant was able to transport oil across 30 kilometers, the oil itself having a notable sulfur content. The plant started to produce lubricating oils for engines and mechanical parts, such as avtol 18 and DP 14 for vehicles, and type TS1 kerosene for airplanes. In 1965, the production of naphthalene soap and naphthalic acid began. The plant is no longer functional, but the area has agriculture, and a public radio station, Radio Stacioni Kombetar Shtermen.

== Sports ==
The city main plays football and its home team is KS Turbina Cërrik. The club was formed in 1956 and its home stadium is Nexhip Trungu Stadium with a capacity of 6,600 spectators. The team plays in the Albanian First Division and it is in group B.

== Notable people ==
- Alban Hoxha
- Armando Sadiku
- Rajmonda Bulku
