= Gostimë =

- Administrative unit
- Location within Albania
- Coordinates: 41°0′N 20°1′E
- Country: Albania
- County: Elbasan
- Municipality: Cërrik

Population (2011)
  - Administrative unit: 8,116
- Time zone: UTC+1 (CET)
  - Summer (DST): UTC+2 (CEST)

Gostimë is a village and a former municipality in the Elbasan County, central Albania. At the 2015 local government reform it became a subdivision of the municipality Cërrik. The population at the 2011 census was 8,116. The municipal unit consists of the villages Gostimë, Gjyral, Shtepanj, Shushicë, Shtermen, Malasej and Çartallos.
