= Banjë Hydro Power Plant =

Hydroelectric power plant in Banjë, Albania

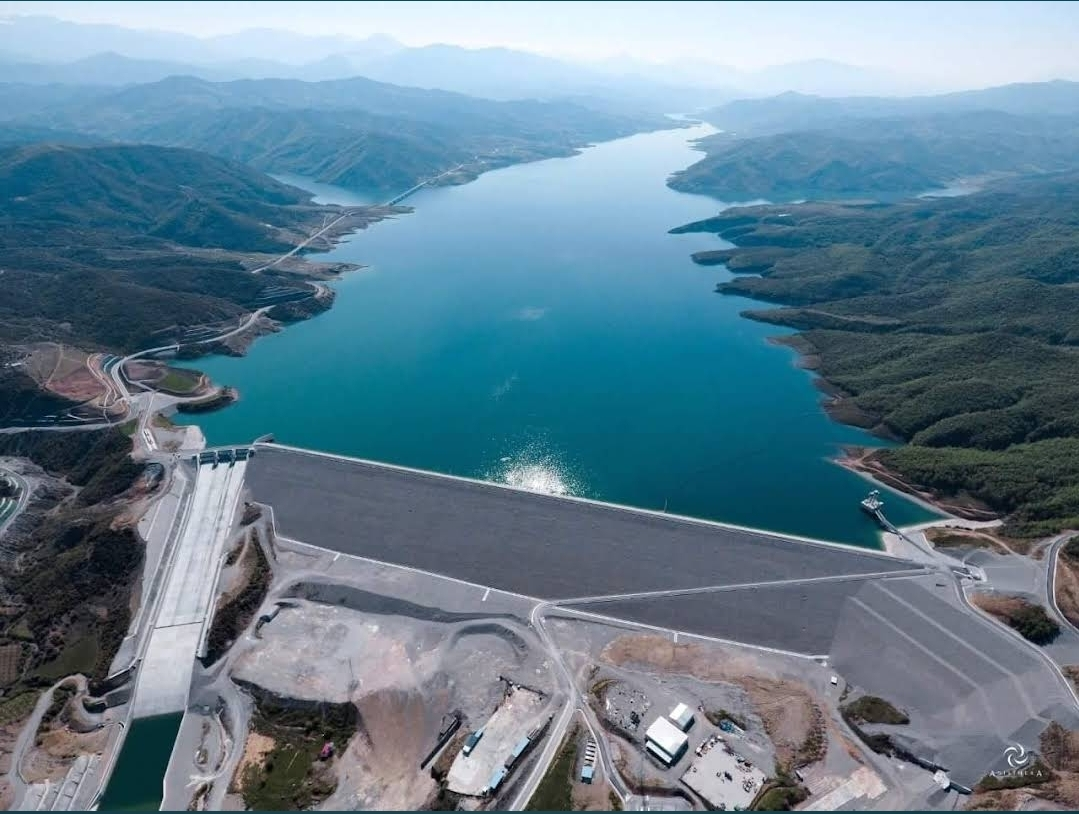
- Banjë Hydro Power Plant in Albania

- Location within Albania
- Country: Albania
- Location: Banjë
- Coordinates: 40.964°N 20.068°E
- Construction began: 1980s, 2013
- Opening date: September 2016
- Owner: Statkraft

Dam and spillways
- Type of dam: Embankment dam
- Impounds: Devoll
- Height: 80 metres
- Length: 900 m (3,000 ft)
- Elevation at crest: 175
- Width (base): 370 m (1,210 ft)
- Dam volume: 4 million metres^{3}

Reservoir
- Creates: Banja Reservoir
- Total capacity: 415 million metres^{3}
- Surface area: 14 km^{2}
- Maximum water depth: 175 metres

Power Station
- Operator: Devoll Hydropower
- Type: Hydroelectric
- Turbines: 1 Francis turbine, 2 GE Renewable Energy francis turbines
- Installed capacity: 72.2 MW
- Annual generation: 255 GWh
- Website https://www.statkraft.com/Global-presence/albania/banja-hydropower-plant/

Banjë Hydro Power Plant is a large hydroelectricity plant on the river Devoll situated near the village of Banjë, Albania. It was built by Devoll Hydropower, an Albanian company owned by Norwegian power company Statkraft. The project consists of a large power plant with a nominal capacity of 70 MW and an average annual production of 242 GWh. The dam is 900 metres long, 370 metres wide and 80 metres high. The reservoir was planned to have a surface area of 14 km^{2}, and a storage capacity of about 400 million m^{3}. It was completed in 2016.

== Construction ==
The Banjë Hydro Power Plant is located near its namesake village, Banjë. It is on the river Devoll. It was completed in 2016. However, construction on it first began sometime in the 1980s. Construction was stopped when the People's Socialist Republic of Albania went bankrupt. After the Albanian government signed a 35-year concessionary agreement with Statkraft, the project was revived.

=== Capacity ===
The power plant has a nominal capacity of 70 MW and an average annual production of 242 GWH.

=== Floating solar plant ===
Statkraft tested adding floating solar panels in 2020. This initiative was later completed in 2023. It has a total installed capacity of 2 MWp, with 0.5 MWp in each of the four panels. Each unit has a diameter of 70 metres. The solar panels are mounted onto floating polyethylene ring pipe and an impermeable membrane. These are anchored on the Banjë Reservoir. Statkraft completely owns the project, although it was built with the help of local Albanian contractors and the Norwegian company Ocean Sun. In June 2021, one of the floating solar panels was partly submerged and severely damaged. A floating solar power plant at an earlier date as well, so Statkraft had to retrieve the solar panel. In the later half of 2021, the companies were planning to add three more solar panels, each with 0.5 MWp each. It is now unknown if the plan to continue with this plan, as they have not yet built it.
