= Mollas, Elbasan =

Mollas
- Administrative unit
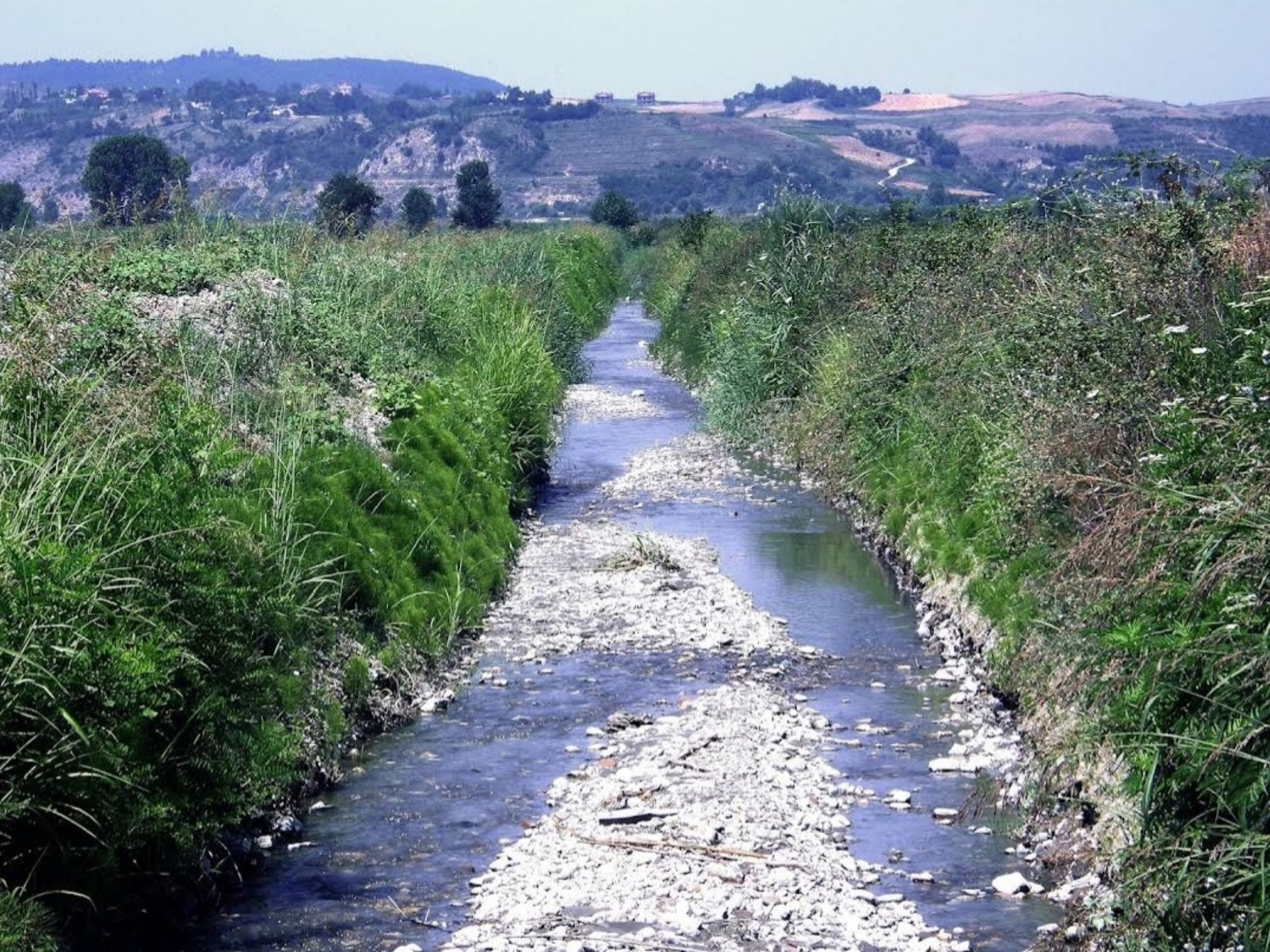

- Location within Albania
- Coordinates: 40°56′N 20°0′E
- Country: Albania
- County: Elbasan
- Municipality: Cërrik

Population (2011)
  - Administrative unit: 5,530
- Time zone: UTC+1 (CET)
  - Summer (DST): UTC+2 (CEST)

Mollas is a village and a former municipality in the Elbasan County, central Albania. At the 2015 local government reform it became a subdivision of the municipality Cërrik. The population at the 2011 census was 5,530. The municipality consists of the villages Mollas, Dasar, Selite, Linas, Kamunah, Dragot and Topojan.

== Geography ==
The village is located in an area consisting of 65% flat arable lands and 35% of hill country.
