= Villages of Elbasan County =

The Elbasan County in central Albania is subdivided into 7 municipalities. These municipalities contain 403 towns and villages:
