= Belsh =

Municipality in Albania

- Municipality
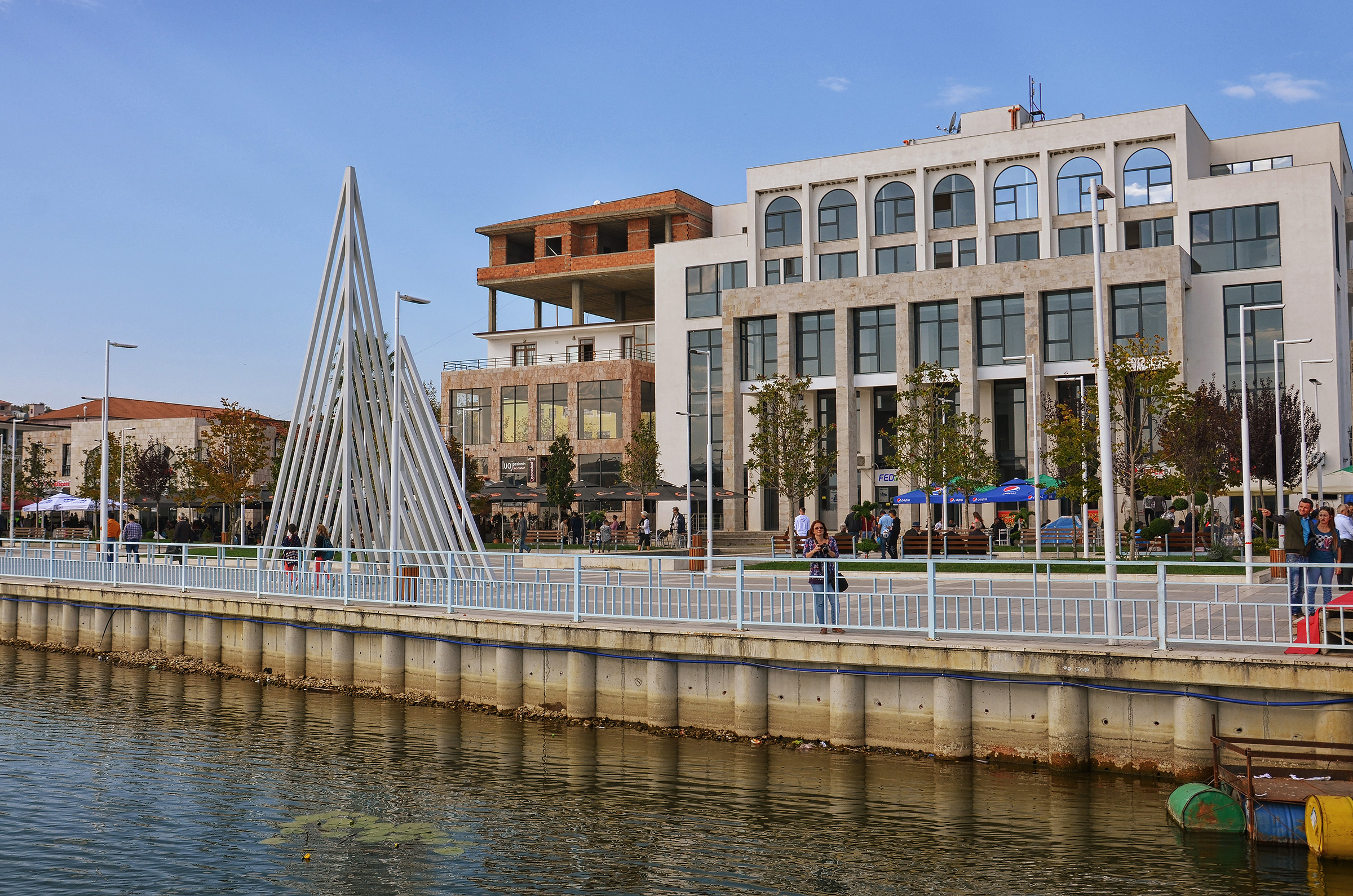
- Center of Belsh

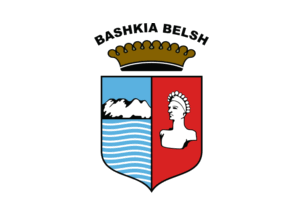
- Flag Seal

- Location within Albania Location within Europe
- Coordinates: 40°59′N 19°53′E
- Country: Albania
- Region: Central Albania
- County: Elbasan

Government
  - Type: Mayor–council
  - Mayor: Arif Tafani (PS)
  - Council: Belsh Municipal Council

Area
  - Municipality: 196.44 km^{2} (75.85 sq mi)

Population (2011)
  - Municipality: 19,503 (Note: The municipality of Belsh consists of the administrative units of Fierzë, Grekan, Kajan, Rrasë and Belsh. The population of the municipality results from the sum of the listed administrative units in the former as of the 2011 Albanian census.)
  - Municipality density: 99.28/km^{2} (257.1/sq mi)
  - Administrative unit: 8,781 (Note: The estimation for the administrative unit of Belsh is to be taken into consideration.)
- Time zone: UTC+1 (CET)
  - Summer (DST): UTC+2 (CEST)
- Postal code: 3008
- Area code: (0)582
- Website: bashkiabelsh.al

Belsh (Albanian: [ˈbɛˈlʃ]; Albanian definite form: Belshi) is a municipality in Elbasan County, central Albania. The municipality consists of the administrative units of Fierzë, Grekan, Kajan, Rrasë with Belsh constituting its seat. As of the Institute of Statistics estimate from the 2011 census, there were 8,781 people residing in Belsh and 19,503 in Belsh Municipality.

== Cityscape ==
Belsh stretches along the western and northern shores of the karst lake Liqeni i Belshit and is the main settlement of the Dumre plateau.

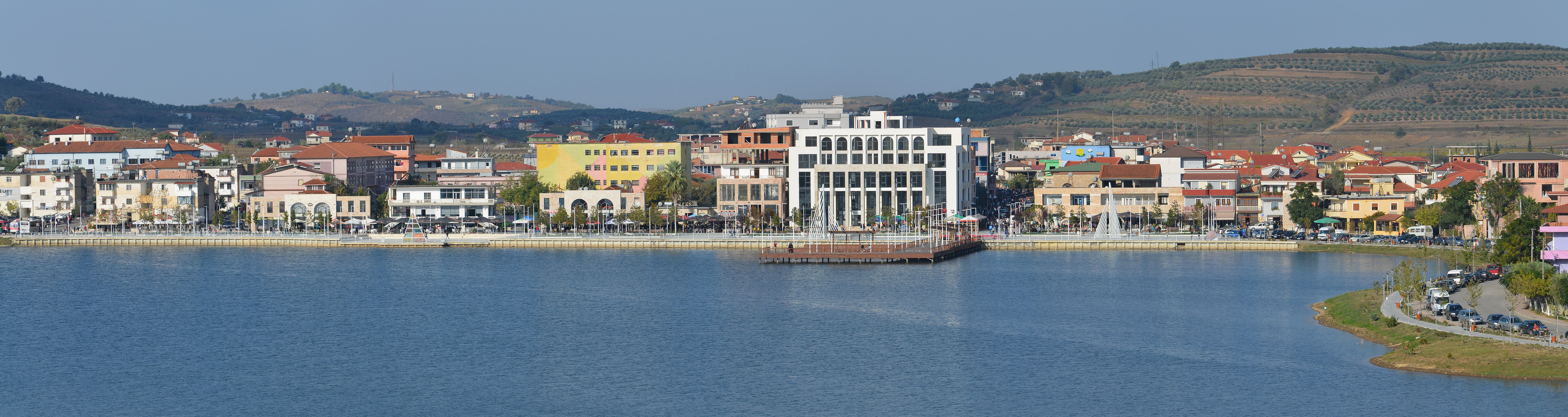
A panoramic view of Belsh

== Municipal Council ==
Seat distribution in the Municipal Council

Following the 2023 local elections, the composition of the Council of Belsh is as follows:

| Name | Abbr. | Seats |
|---|---|---|
| Socialist Party of Albania; Partia Socialiste e Shqipërisë | PS | 10 |
| Democratic Party of Albania; Partia Demokratike e Shqipërisë | PD | 3 |
| Together We Win; Bashkë Fitojmë | BF | 2 |
| Legality Movement Party; Lëvizja e Legalitetit | PLL | 2 |
| Movement for National Development; Lëvizja për Zhvillim Kombëtar | LZHK | 1 |
| Republican Party of Albania; Partia Republikane e Shqipërisë | PR | 1 |
| Social Democratic Party of Albania; Partia Socialdemokrate e Shqipërisë | PDS | 1 |
| Green Party of Albania; Partia e Gjelbër e Shqipërisë | PGJ | 1 |
