= Lika Yanko =

Bulgarian artist

- Born: Evangjelia Grabova; March 19, 1928; Sofia, Kingdom of Bulgaria
- Died: June 22, 2001 (aged 73); Sofia, Republic of Bulgaria
- Known for: Painting
- Movement: National Academy of Art
- Awards: Sofia Award (1989)

Lika Yanko (Bulgarian: Лика Янко; March 19, 1928 – June 22, 2001) was a Bulgarian artist born in Sofia. Her paintings are renowned for their abstract nature and their use of found materials.

== Biography ==
Lika Yanko was born in Bulgaria's capital, Sofia, in 1928 as Evangeliya Grabova, to Albanian immigrant parents from the region of Grabova. Her father was Llazër Grabova. Her family were Orthodox Christians. Her mother Efrosina was originally from the village of Llëngë, within the town of Trebinjë which is by Pogradec, Albania. Her family spoke the Albanian language in the Tosk dialect. Lika has a brother Petar and a sister Danka. Her family migrated to Bulgaria from Albania due to a blood feud known as Gjakmarrje in Albanian. Her father's cousin was murdered therefore her family retaliated towards the murderer and then fled to Bulgaria to avoid more bloodshed.

She studied at the French College in Sofia, where she was exposed to artists as Paul Cézanne, Vincent van Gogh, Paul Gauguin, who influenced her art. In 1946 she joined the National Academy of Art studying painting in the classes of Prof. Dechko Uzunov and Prof. Iliya Petrov, but she did not graduate. At the time, her work was met with criticism and resistances both from state authorities and the aesthetic preferences of her professors and other contemporary painters.

Her paintings are frequently colorful, although the white color is predominant or easily notable because, according to the Lika, this is the color of God. Her canvases often encapsulate beads, buttons, hemp ropes, nuts, glass, pebbles.

Her first solo exhibition was in Sofia in 1967 but paintings were branded as avant-garde and the show was banned several days after it opened. Yanko continued to paint but did not exhibited her canvases until 1981, when she was invited for an exhibition personally by Lyudmila Zhivkova. In the mid-1970s and later in the 80s her paintings began to be bought by foreign embassies and received the attention of European galleries. In 1989 she received the Sofia Award.

Yanko had only 7 exhibitions during her lifetime. She died on June 22, 2001, in Sofia from pneumonia, only a few days after the opening of her last exhibition, in the Cavallet Gallery in Varna.
