= Blerimas, Elbasan =

Blerimas
- Village
- Location within Albania
- Coordinates: 41.0°N 20.11°E
- Country: Albania
- County: Elbasan
- Municipality: Elbasan
- Administrative unit: Tregan
- Time zone: UTC+1 (CET)
  - Summer (DST): UTC+2 (CEST)

Blerimas is a village in the administrative unit of Tregan in Elbasan County, central Albania. At the 2015 local government reform it became part of the municipality Elbasan.
