= Tunjë =

- Administrative unit
- Location within Albania
- Coordinates: 40°50′N 20°7′E
- Country: Albania
- County: Elbasan
- Municipality: Gramsh

Population (2011)
  - Administrative unit: 1,393
- Time zone: UTC+1 (CET)
  - Summer (DST): UTC+2 (CEST)

Tunjë is a village and a former municipality in the Elbasan County, central Albania. At the 2015 local government reform it became a subdivision of the municipality Gramsh. The population at the 2011 census was 1,393. The municipal unit consists of the villages Tunjë, Tunjë e Re, Duzhe, Jance Qënder, Jance Mal, Prrenjas, Irmenj, Plepas, Katerlis, Oban, Sarasel and Lubinje.
