= Shushicë, Elbasan =

Shushicë
- Administrative unit
- Location within Albania
- Coordinates: 41°6′N 20°9′E
- Country: Albania
- County: Elbasan
- Municipality: Elbasan

Population (2011)
  - Administrative unit: 8,731
- Time zone: UTC+1 (CET)
  - Summer (DST): UTC+2 (CEST)

Shushicë is a village and a former municipality in the Elbasan County, central Albania. At the 2015 local government reform it became a subdivision of the municipality Elbasan. The population at the 2011 census was 8,731. The municipal unit consists of the villages Shushicë, Shelcan, Mlize, Hajdaran, Fush-Bull, Vasjan, Polis i Vogël, Polis Vale and Vreshtaj. The St. Nicholas' Church is close to the village.
