= Kukur =

- Administrative unit
- Location within Albania
- Coordinates: 40.87°N 20.37°E
- Country: Albania
- County: Elbasan
- Municipality: Gramsh
- Time zone: UTC+1 (CET)
  - Summer (DST): UTC+2 (CEST)

Kukur is a village and a former municipality in the Elbasan County, central Albania. At the 2015 local government reform it became a subdivision of the municipality Gramsh. The population at the 2011 census was 2,560. The municipal unit consists of the villages Snosem, Sojnik, Mukaj, Irmath, Kalaj, Gribe, Vreshtas, Kukur, Rashtan and Grazhdan.
