= Pishaj =

- Administrative unit
- Location within Albania
- Coordinates: 40°50′N 20°13′E
- Country: Albania
- County: Elbasan
- Municipality: Gramsh

Population (2011)
  - Administrative unit: 4,906
- Time zone: UTC+1 (CET)
  - Summer (DST): UTC+2 (CEST)

Pishaj is a village and a former municipality in the Elbasan County, central Albania. At the 2015 local government reform it became a subdivision of the municipality Gramsh. The population at the 2011 census was 4,906.
