= Skënderbegas =

- Administrative unit
- Location within Albania
- Coordinates: 40°47′N 20°14′E
- Country: Albania
- County: Elbasan
- Municipality: Gramsh

Population (2011)
  - Administrative unit: 1,239
- Time zone: UTC+1 (CET)
  - Summer (DST): UTC+2 (CEST)

Skënderbegas is a village and a former municipality in the Elbasan County, central Albania. At the 2015 local government reform it became a subdivision of the municipality Gramsh. The population at the 2011 census was 1,239. The municipal unit consists of the villages Skënderbegas, Shemberdhenj, Zenelas, Narte, Harunas, Bletez, Fushez, Kullollas, Vidhan, Ermenj, Kotke, Lemnush and Siman. The name of the village comes from the Albanian national hero Skenderbeg.
