= Sult, Albania =

Sult
- Administrative unit
- Location within Albania
- Coordinates: 40°53′N 20°6′E
- Country: Albania
- County: Elbasan
- Municipality: Gramsh

Population (2011)
  - Administrative unit: 631
- Time zone: UTC+1 (CET)
  - Summer (DST): UTC+2 (CEST)

Sult is a village and a former municipality in the Elbasan County, central Albania. At the 2015 local government reform, it became a subdivision of the municipality Gramsh. The population at the 2011 census was 631. The municipal unit consists of the villages Mazrek, Dushk(Silare), Kukucov, Kuterqar, Sult, Zgjup Koder, Zgjup Fushë, Dufshan, and Grekan.
