= Moglicë =

- Administrative unit
- Location within Albania
- Coordinates: 40°42′N 20°24′E
- Country: Albania
- County: Korçë
- Municipality: Maliq

Population (2011)
  - Administrative unit: 951
- Time zone: UTC+1 (CET)
  - Summer (DST): UTC+2 (CEST)
- Postal Code: 7018
- Area Code: (0)865

Moglicë is a village and a former municipality in the Korçë County, southeastern Albania. At the 2015 local government reform it became a subdivision of the municipality Maliq. The population at the 2011 census was 951. The municipal unit consists of the villages Moglicë, Gopesh, Dobërçan, Maliq-Opar, Gurkuq, Bardhas, Zerec, Dushar, Torovec, Shpatmal, Peshtan, Lumaj, Protopapë, Osojë, Gurshqipe, Kucakë and Nikollarë.

The works for the Moglicë dam in the river Devoll and the road to it concentrate almost 400 workers close to the village, that has 1 small market and at least 2 bars.
