= Kushovë =

- Administrative unit
- Location within Albania
- Coordinates: 40°47′N 20°11′E
- Country: Albania
- County: Elbasan
- Municipality: Gramsh

Population (2011)
  - Administrative unit: 659
- Time zone: UTC+1 (CET)
  - Summer (DST): UTC+2 (CEST)

Kushovë is a village and a former municipality in the Elbasan County, central Albania. At the 2015 local government reform it became a subdivision of the municipality Gramsh. The population at the 2011 census was 659. The municipal unit consists of the villages Kushovë, Bregas, Gjeraqine, Dumberas, Brasnik, Ulove, Sotire and Kerpice.
