= Polisi =

Mountain in Albania

- Mali i Polisit
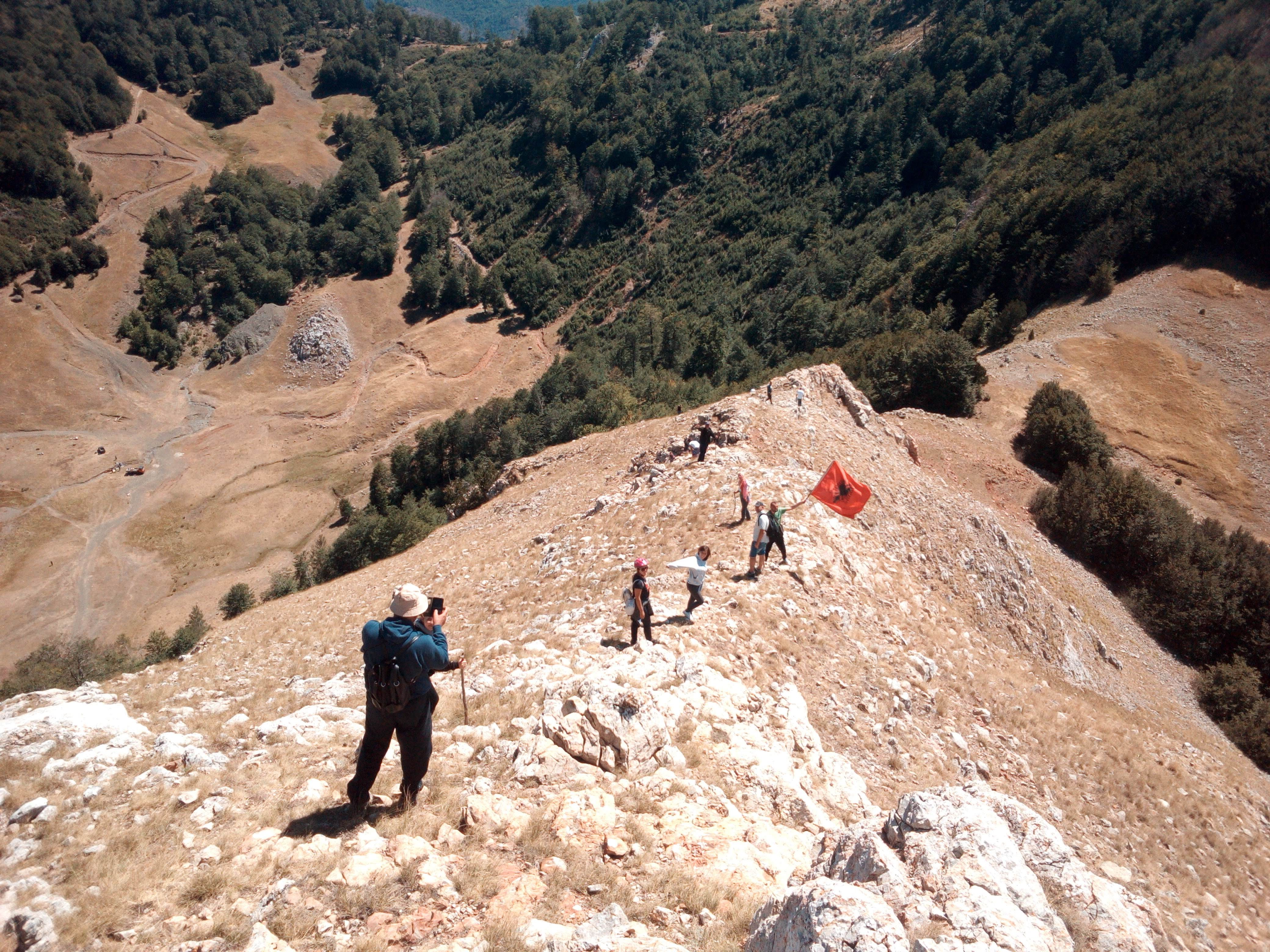
- Climbing the Polisi massif

Highest point
- Elevation: 1,974 m (6,476 ft)
- Prominence: 864 m (2,835 ft)
- Isolation: 7.28 km (4.52 mi)
- Coordinates: 41°07′00″N 20°19′00″E

Geography
- Location within Albania
- Country: Albania
- Region: Central Mountain Region
- Municipality: Librazhd
- Parent range: Shpat–Polis–Lenie

Geology
- Rock age(s): Late Cretaceous, Paleogene
- Mountain type: massif
- Rock type(s): limestone, ultrabasic rock

Polisi is a massif located in the municipality of Librazhd, in eastern Albania. Its highest peak, Maja e Polisit, reaches a height of 1,974 m (6,476 ft). The other important peak of the massif is Mali Plak, standing at 1,943 m (6,375 ft) above sea level.

== Geology ==
Composed primarily of limestone and partly of ultrabasic rocks, the massif has the shape of a dome with jagged edges. The upper section consists of glacial and karst relief forms (ridges, valleys, cirques, pits, funnels, etc.), with numerous water sources on its sides that feed the Shkumbin river.

== Biodiversity ==
The mountain mass is covered with oak and beech forests, as well as alpine summer pastures. Various endemic plants can be found here, including the Albanian lily, several types of violets and clovers (especially Trifolium subterraneum with high protein content). The southern limit of Polisi is a distribution area of the Alpine sunflower (Leontopodium nivale). Mountain tea and orchid are abundant.

There is also a reserve for wild boar. Some sections of the mountain contain iron-nickel ores and bauxite.

== History ==
In classical antiquity Polisi was a central mountain range in southern Illyria, and was known as Kandavia (Kandauia) or Candaviae Montes (Candauiae Montes). It likely gave the name to the part of Via Egnatia that followed the convergence of its two branches from Dyrrhachium and Apollonia, which was attested in Strabo's Geography.

== See also ==
- List of mountains in Albania
