= Kodovjat =

- Administrative unit
- Location within Albania
- Coordinates: 40°48′N 20°15′E
- Country: Albania
- County: Elbasan
- Municipality: Gramsh

Population (2011)
  - Administrative unit: 2,355
- Time zone: UTC+1 (CET)
  - Summer (DST): UTC+2 (CEST)

Kodovjat is a village and a former municipality in the Elbasan County, central Albania. At the 2015 local government reform it became a subdivision of the municipality Gramsh. The population at the 2011 census was 2,355. The municipal unit consists of the villages Kodovjat, Bratilë, Bulcar, Kishte, Kokel, Posnovisht, Shelcan, Bersnik i Poshtëm, Bersnik i Sipërm, Mashan and Broshtan.
