= Klos, Elbasan =

Klos
- Administrative unit
- Location within Albania
- Coordinates: 40°57′N 20°1′E
- Country: Albania
- County: Elbasan
- Municipality: Cërrik

Population (2011)
  - Administrative unit: 3,262
- Time zone: UTC+1 (CET)
  - Summer (DST): UTC+2 (CEST)

Klos is a village and a former municipality in Elbasan County, central Albania. At the 2015 local government reform it became a subdivision of the municipality Cërrik. The population at the 2011 census was 3,262. The municipality consists of the villages Klos, Selvias, Qyrkan, Lumas, Qafë, Floq, Trunç and Banjë.
