= Mali i Shpatit =

Mountain in Albania

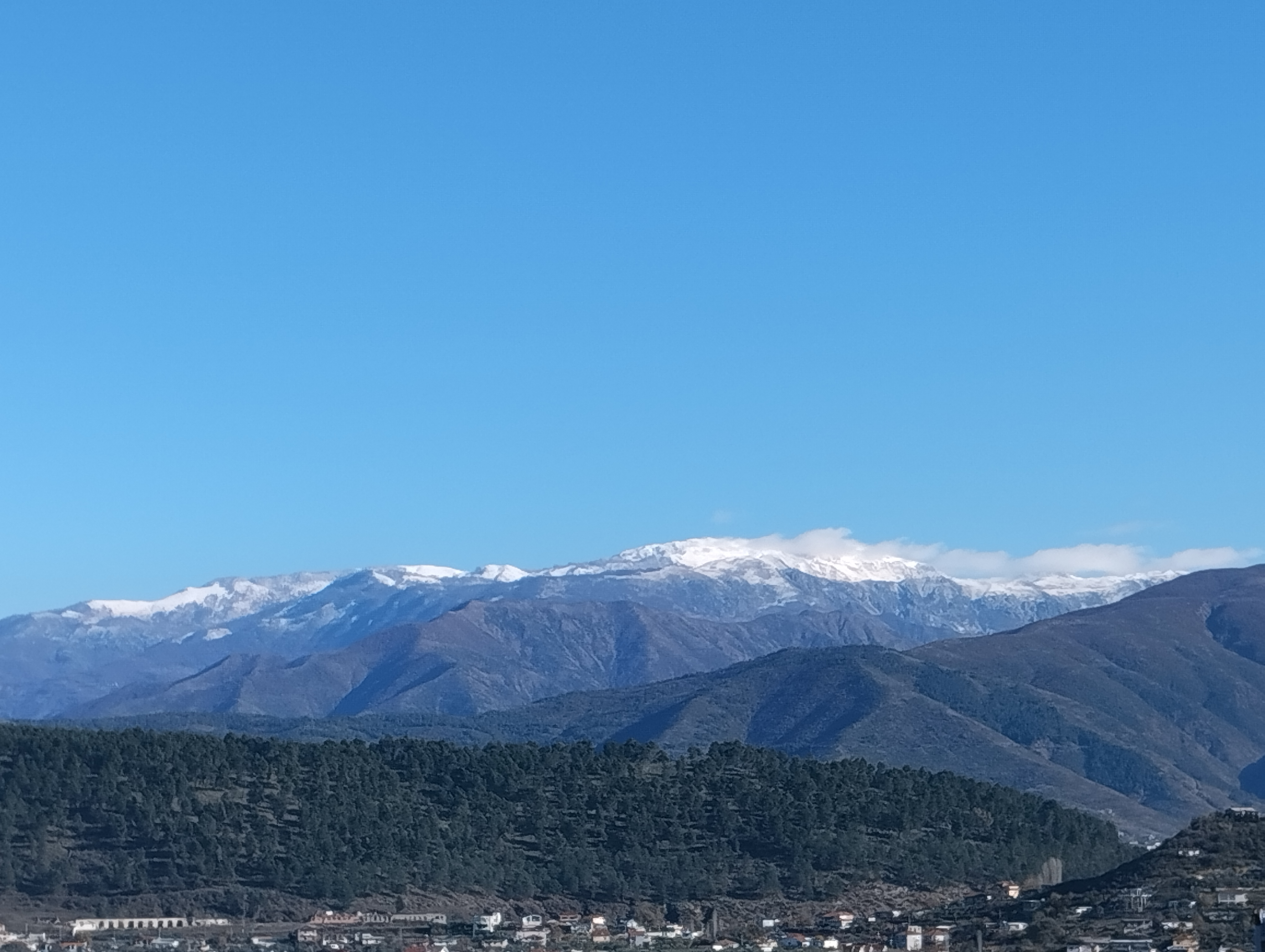

Highest point
- Elevation: 1,831 m (6,007 ft)
- Prominence: 286 m (938 ft)
- Isolation: 9.023 km (5.607 mi)
- Coordinates: 41°02′02″N 20°13′26″E

Naming
- English translation: Slope Mountain

Geography
- Location within Albania
- Country: Albania
- Region: Central Mountain Region
- Municipality: Elbasan
- Parent range: Shpat–Polis–Lenie

Geology
- Mountain type: massif
- Rock type: ultrabasic rock

Mali i Shpatit (lit. 'Slope Mountain') is a massif located in the southeastern part of Elbasan municipality, near the border with Librazhd, in central Albania. It has a northwest–southeast orientation, spanning a length of approximately 20 km (12 mi) and a width of 4–5 km (2.5–3.1 mi). Its highest peak, Maja e Bukanikut, reaches a height of 1,823 m (5,981 ft).

== Geology ==
Composed primarily of ultrabasic magmatic rocks, the massif features numerous peaks and glacial relief forms such as troughs and cirques. It is heavily forested by deciduous and coniferous trees, which have practical uses. The wildlife in the area includes wild boar, roe deer, bear, ibex, and wild goat.

== See also ==
- List of mountains in Albania
