= Devoll (river) =

River in southern Albania

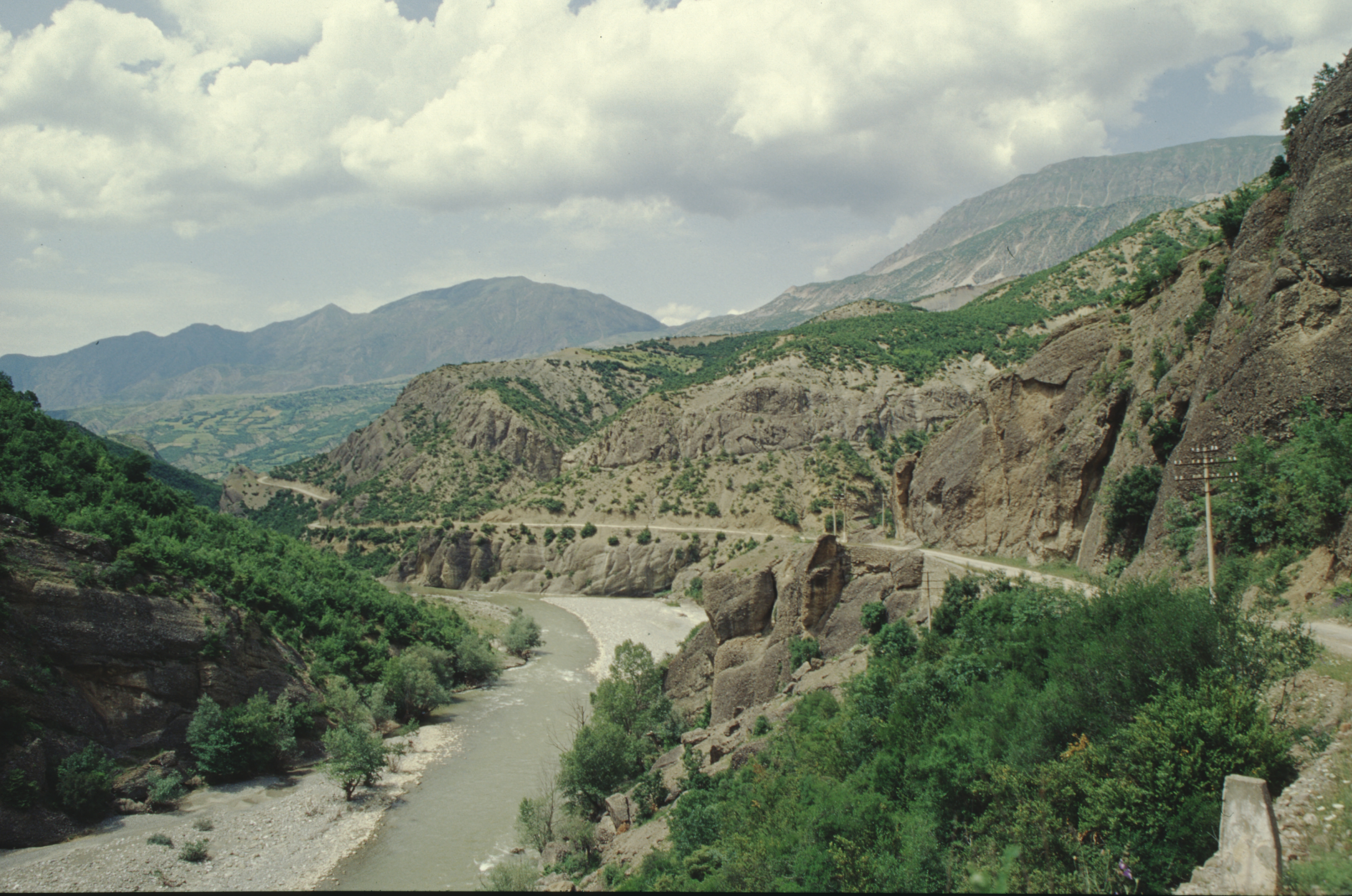
- Devoll river valley, south of Moglicë.

Location
- Country: Albania
- Counties: Berat; Elbasan; Korçë
- Cities: Bilisht; Gramsh; Kuçovë; Maliq

Physical characteristics
- Source
  - location: Nikolicë, Korçë County
  - coordinates: 40.485°N 20.767°E
- Mouth
  - location: Seman near Kuçovë
  - coordinates: 40.8128°N 19.8588°E
- Length: 196 km (122 mi)
- Basin size: 3,140 km^{2} (1,210 mi^{2})
- Discharge
  - average: 49.5 m^{3}/s (1,750 cu ft/s)

Basin features
- Progression: Seman→ Adriatic Sea

The Devoll (Albanian: Devoll; Albanian definite form: Devolli) is a river in southern Albania. It is one of the source rivers of the Seman. It is 196 km (122 mi) long and its drainage basin is 3,130 km^{2} (1,210 sq mi). Its average discharge is 49.5 m^{3}/s (1,750 cu ft/s). Its source is in the southwestern corner of the Devoll municipality, close to the Greek border. It flows initially northeast, through Miras, then north through Bilisht, and northwest through Progër, Pojan (in the northern Korçë Plain which was marshy until after the World War II), Maliq, Moglicë, Kodovjat, Gramsh, where it is stowed in a big lake and Gostimë, where it turns south. It joins the Osum near Kuçovë, to form the Seman. The Seman opens into a small delta south of the Karavasta lagoon in the Adriatic Sea.

A number of hydroelectricity plants on the river Devoll are planned or under construction. The Albanian company Devoll Hydropower, owned and operated by the Norwegian power company Statkraft, is building two hydroelectricity plants near Banjë (Banjë Hydro Power Plant) and near Moglicë (Moglicë Hydro Power Plant), with combined capacity 242 MW. The decision whether a third plant near Kokel is to be built, will be taken when the first two dams are completed.

At an unspecified location in the valley of Devoll, Bohemund of Taranto and the Byzantine Emperor Alexius I made an agreement in 1108, in the wake of the First Crusade. This treaty is named after the Byzantine fortress of Deabolis. Although the treaty was not immediately enforced, it was intended to make the Principality of Antioch a vassal state of the Byzantine Empire.

During 1970 significant amounts of water from the river was diverted into the Small Prespa Lake with the intention to use it later during the summer time for irrigation purposes. Due to the high suspended solids in the river water significant siltation occurred on the Albanian side. The practice has recently stopped.

== See also ==
- Geography of Albania
- List of rivers of Albania
