= Shkumbin =

River in Albania

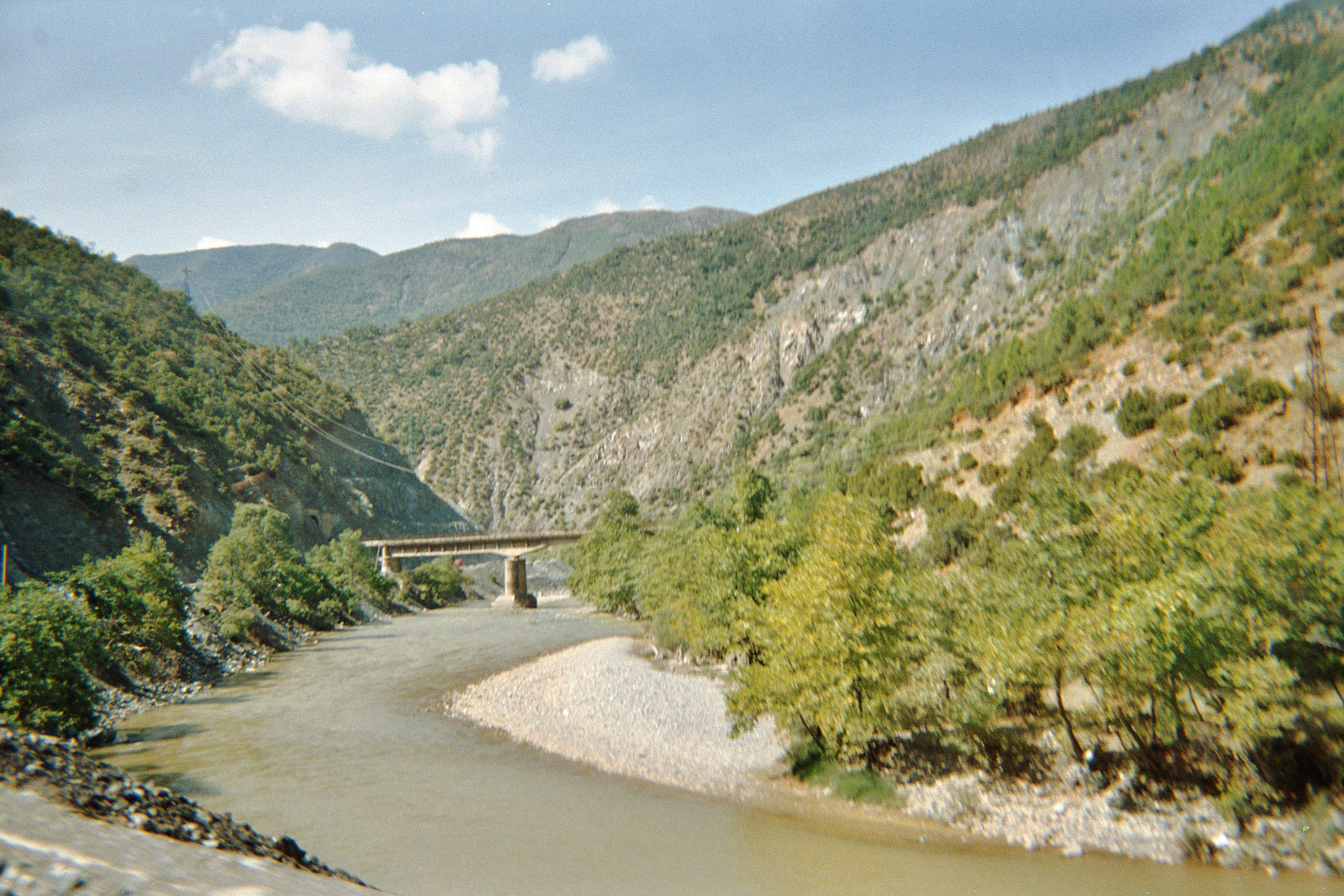
- Shkumbin Gorge between Librazhd and Elbasan

Location
- Country: Albania

Physical characteristics
- Source: Valamara
  - location: Korçë County
  - coordinates: 40°47′57″N 20°18′14″E
  - elevation: 2,120 m (6,960 ft)
- Mouth: 18 km (11 mi) west of Rrogozhinë
  - location: Adriatic Sea
  - coordinates: 41°2′23″N 19°26′34″E
  - elevation: 0 m (0 ft)
- Length: 181.4 km (112.7 mi)
- Basin size: 2,444 km^{2} (944 sq mi)
- Discharge
  - average: 61.5 m^{3}/s (2,170 cu ft/s)

The Shkumbin (/ʃkuːmbiːn/; Albanian pronunciation: [ʃkumbin]) is a river in Albania. It is 181.4 km (112.7 mi) long and its drainage basin is 2,444 km^{2} (944 sq mi). Its average discharge is 61.5 m^{3}/s (2,170 cu ft/s).

== Etymology ==
It derives from Latin Scampinus (recorded alternatively as Scampis), which replaced the Illyrian name of the river: Genusus (recorded in Latin: Genusus, also Genessus, and in Ancient Greek: Γενούσος). A Slavic intermediation has been rejected. Its inclusion in Latin loanwords into Proto-Albanian and phonetic evolution coincides with the historical existence of a large Roman town (near present-day Elbasan), which gave the river its new name.

== Course ==
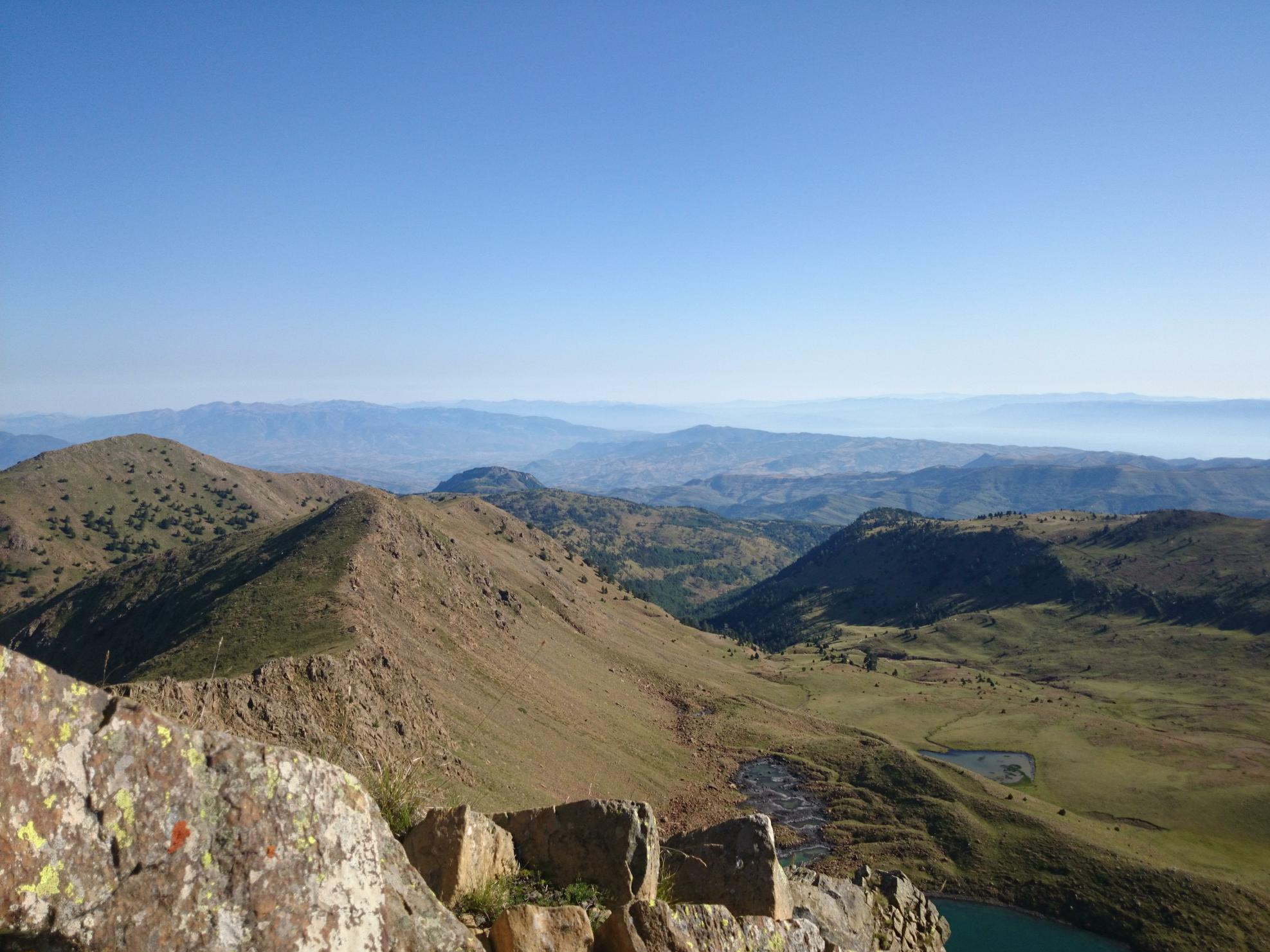
Origin of the river at Valamara

The river originates in the eastern Valamara Mountains between Maja e Valamarës (2,375 m (7,792 ft)) and Gur i Topit (2,120 m (6,960 ft)) in Southeastern Albania. After descending from the Valamaras, it flows northwards through Proptisht and Qukës with many deep gorges and canyons and passes the Gora Mountains. A significant inflow comes from Gur i Kamjës (1,481 m (4,859 ft)) southwest of Pogradec. Over the course, it flows inside a syncline between the Mokra and Shebenik Mountains in the east and the Polis Mountains in the west. Close to Librazhd the river turns some 50 km (31 mi) westwards of its origin and joins the Rapun stream. At the end, the river crosses the Myzeqe Plain and forms a small delta in Karavasta Lagoon, the direct proximity of the Adriatic Sea.

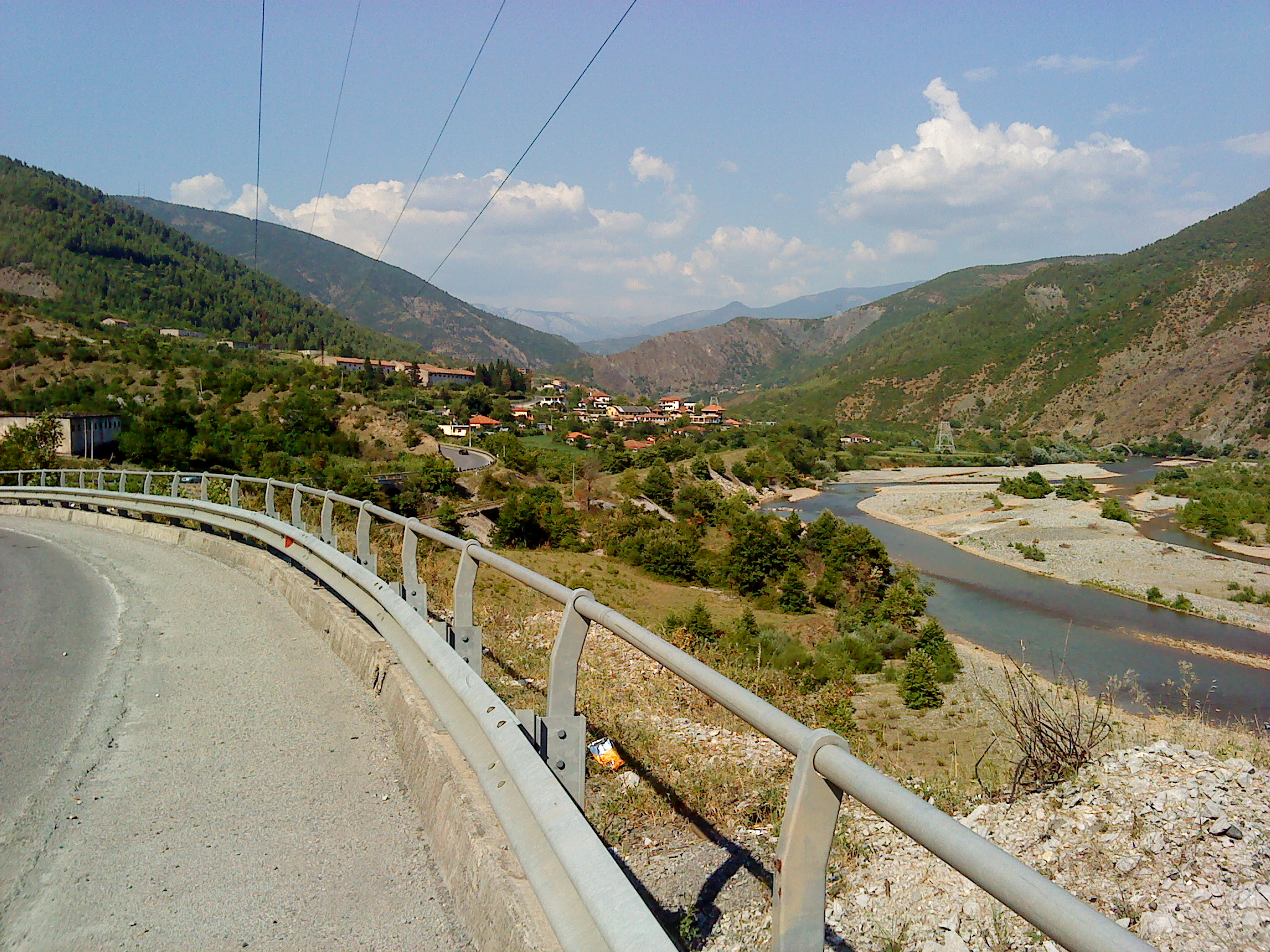
Shkumbin Valley about 5 km east of Elbasan

== Human history ==
The ancient name of the river was Genusus and was located in central southern Illyria. At the same time, it was referred as Scampini, as it was identified by the town of Scampa. In classical antiquity, the valley of the Shkumbin was inhabited by several Illyrian peoples. The Parthini lived in the middle valley of the river. They neighbored to the west the Taulantii who lived in the coastal area including the lower valley of the river, and to the east the Dassaretii who lived in the region of Lake Ohrid, including the upper valley of the river. The ancient Via Egnatia followed the river, giving it the role of a strategically important corridor between orient and occident. The Via Egnatia started with two branches, the northern one from Epidamnos-Dyrrhachion, and the southern one from Apollonia. The two branches converged at Ad Quintum, near modern Elbasan, continuing eastwards through the valley of the Shkumbin.

In Roman Imperial times, the line of division between the administrative provinces of Illyricum and Epirus Nova ran from the west somewhere between Scodra and Dyrrachium, to the east somewhere between the north side of the Shkumbin and Lake Ohrid. During this period, the valley of Shkumbin constituted roughly the border between the Latin and the Greek-speaking area.

The river is roughly the geographical dividing line between Tosk and Gheg Albanian dialects, with Gheg spoken north of the Shkumbin and Tosk south of it. The dialectal split occurred after Christianisation of the region (4th century AD), with the river as the historic dialectal boundary which straddled the Jireček line.

== See also ==
- Geography of Albania
- Central Mountain Range
- Rivers of Albania

== Bibliography ==
- Cabanes, Pierre (2007). "Parthini". In Hubert, Cancik; Schneider, Helmuth; Salazar, Christine F. (eds.). Brill's New Pauly, Antiquity, Volume 10 (Obl-phe). Vol. 7. Brill. ISBN 978-90-04-14215-2.
- Castiglioni, Maria Paola (2010). Cadmos-serpent en Illyrie: itinéraire d'un héros civilisateur. Edizioni Plus. ISBN 978-88-8492-742-2.
- Stocker, Sharon R. (2009). Illyrian Apollonia: Toward a New Ktisis and Developmental History of the Colony.
- Wilkes, John J. (1992). The Illyrians. Oxford, United Kingdom: Blackwell Publishing. ISBN 0-631-19807-5.
- Ismajli, Rexhep (2015). Eqrem Basha (ed.). Studime për historinë e shqipes në kontekst ballkanik [Studies on the History of Albanian in the Balkan context] (PDF) (in Albanian). Prishtinë: Kosova Academy of Sciences and Arts, special editions CLII, Section of Linguistics and Literature.
- Demiraj, Shaban (2006). The origin of the Albanians: linguistically investigated. Tirana: Academy of Sciences of Albania. ISBN 978-99943-817-1-5.
