= Gramsh (municipality) =

- Municipality
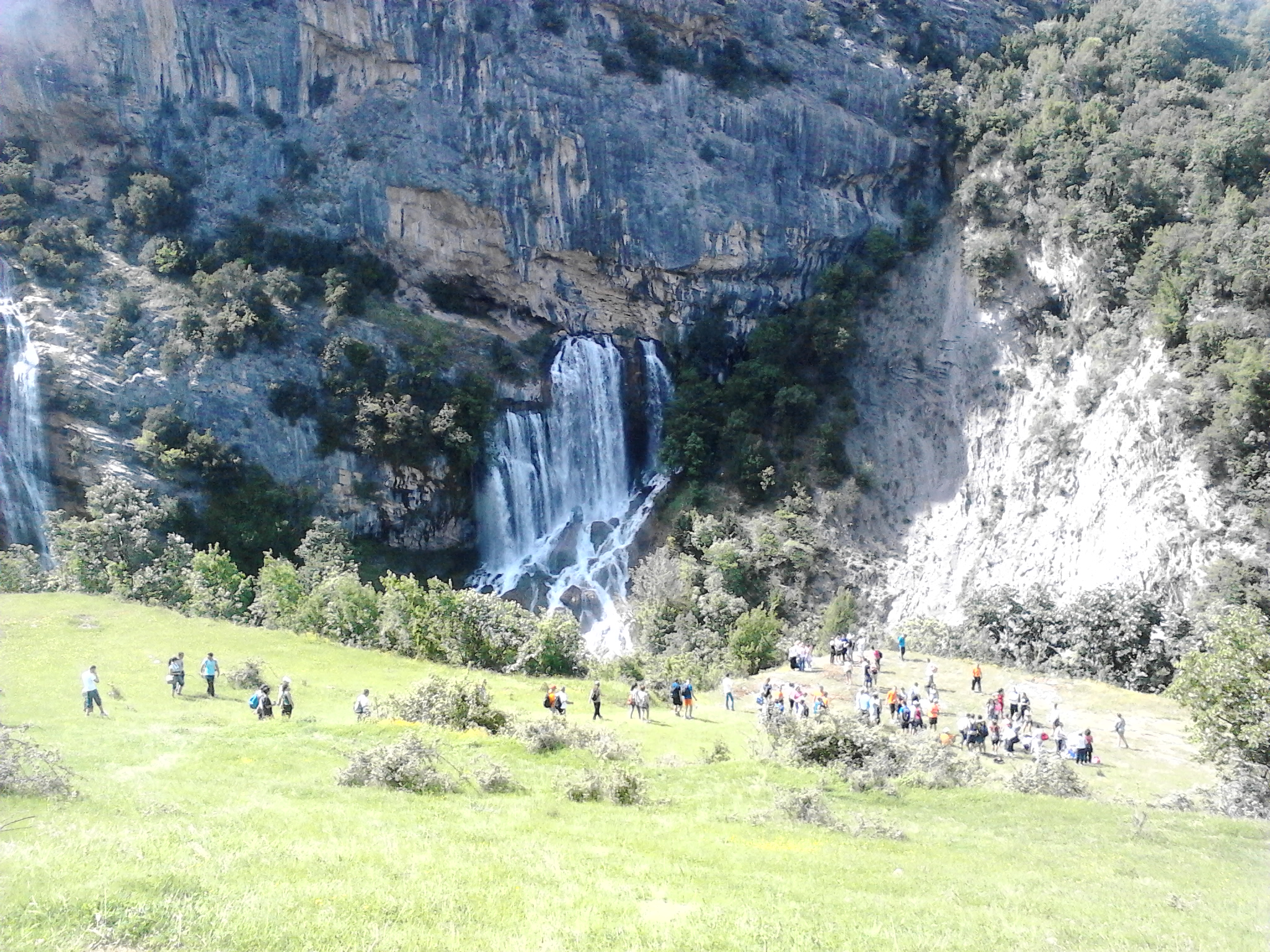
- Sotira Waterfall from a distance

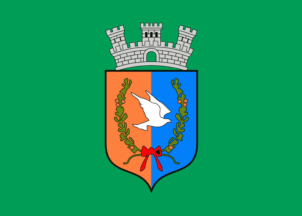
- Flag Emblem

- Location within Albania
- Coordinates: 40°52′N 20°11′E
- Country: Albania
- County: Elbasan

Government
  - Mayor: Besion Ajazi (PS)

Area
  - Municipality: 739.75 km^{2} (285.62 sq mi)

Population (2023)
  - Municipality: 16,533
  - Municipality density: 22.349/km^{2} (57.885/sq mi)
  - Administrative unit: 6,786
- Time zone: UTC+1 (CET)
  - Summer (DST): UTC+2 (CEST)
- Postal Code: 3301
- Area Code: (0)513
- Website: bashkiagramsh.gov.al

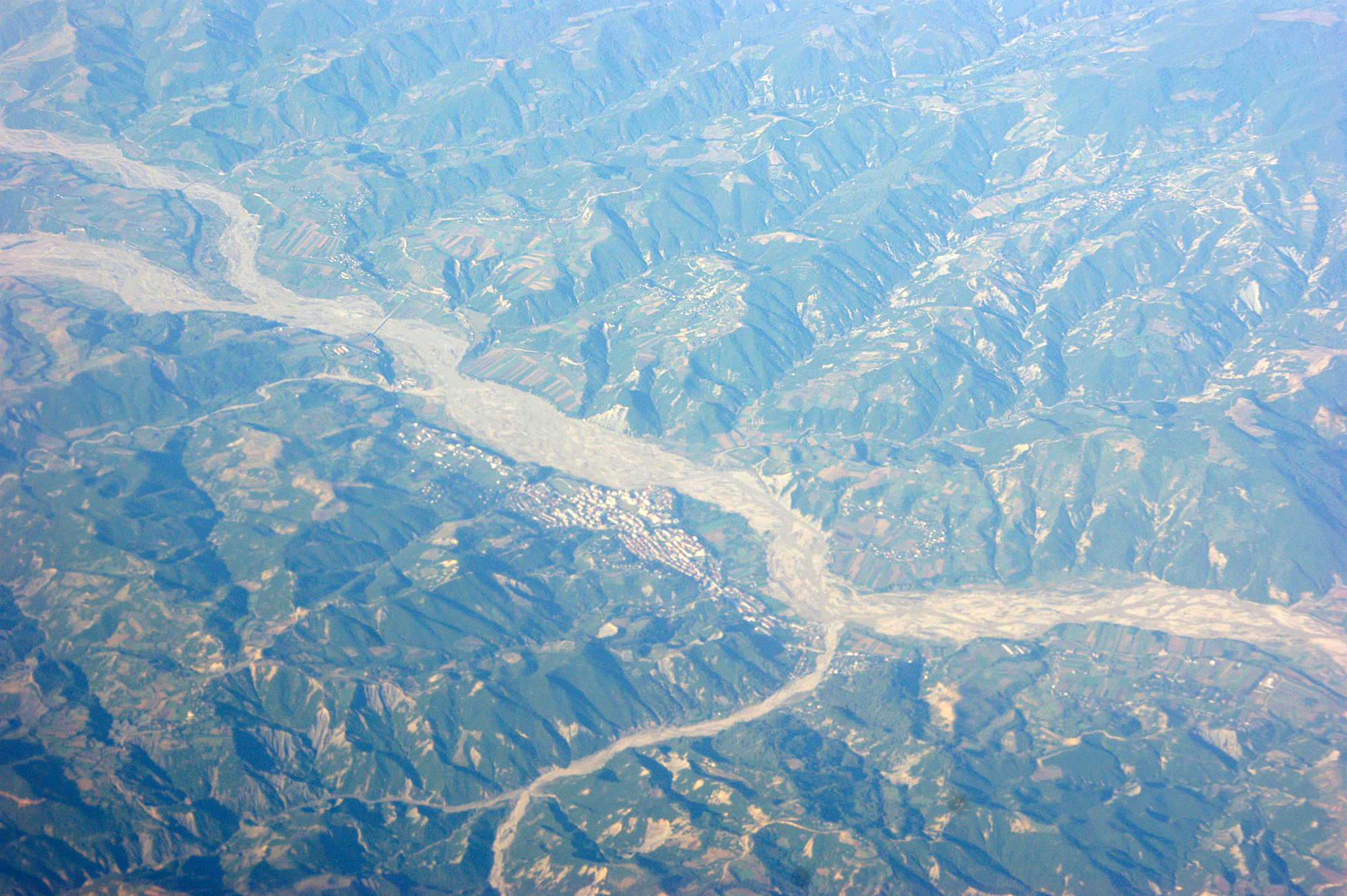
Gramsh from the air

Gramsh (Albanian definite form: Gramshi) is a town and a municipality in Elbasan County, central Albania. The municipality was formed at the 2015 local government reform by the merger of the former municipalities Gramsh, Kodovjat, Kukur, Kushovë, Lenie, Pishaj, Poroçan, Skënderbegas, Sult and Tunjë, that became municipal units. The seat of the municipality is the town Gramsh. The total population is 16,533 as of the 2011 census, in a total area of 739.75 km^{2}. The population of the former municipality as of the 2023 census is 6,786.

Historical population
| Year | Pop. | ±% |
|---|---|---|
| 1955 | 994 | — |
| 1960 | 1,463 | +47.2% |
| 1969 | 3,300 | +125.6% |
| 1979 | 5,300 | +60.6% |
| 1989 | 7,706 | +45.4% |
| 2001 | 10,533 | +36.7% |
| 2011 | 8,440 | −19.9% |
| 2023 | 6,786 | −19.6% |

The town is connected with Elbasan, Korça, Pogradec, Skrapar, Librazhd and Berat. The town is crossed by the river Devoll.

== Etymology ==
During the Ottoman period and before the Albanian Declaration of Independence in 1912, it was known as Grameç in Turkish.

== History ==
Gramsh has been inhabited since ancient times, as is confirmed by archaeological findings in the Tumulus of Cëruja. In the Middle Ages, the area was under the possession of Prince George Arianiti. During Ottoman rule, it was a kaza administrative division within the Sanjak of Elbasan of the Monastir Vilayet.
In the 16th century it was reported as having 400 houses and 18 shops, the area also had around 500 active rebels who attacked the Ottomans from time to time. From 1912 until 1947, this was the center of the Gramsh area. With the new administrative division, it became the center of Gramsh District, in which were placed various state institutions. Gramsh was declared a city on July 10, 1960. Since 1965, it has been a municipality.

Historically the southern part of the district was part of the ethnographic region of Tomorrica, and its population was primarily Bektashi, a Sufi order linked to both Sunnism and Shiism, while the northern part of the district was more heavily Sunni, but there is also a Bektashi tekke in the town of Dushk, in the administrative unit of Kodovjat. There are also Orthodox Christians in addition to Muslims in the southeastern region of Lenie, especially in historically Aromanian towns such as Grabovë. There were ethnically Albanian Orthodox Christians from in the nearby Shpat region of the former Elbasan district, which borders Gramsh. Many of Gramsh's municipalities saw less than 50% of the population declare themselves for any religion, including Tunjë, Sult, Poroçan, Gramsh the city itself, and Kodovjat, as well as the neighboring Mollas region which is historically linked to Gramsh although it wasn't part of the municipality recently.

On 20 August 2022, Gramsh’s weapons factory was attacked by two Russians and one Ukrainian. The Albanian Police arrested the three suspects after.

== Economy ==
The city was home of one of the main military weaponry factories during the communist era. Devolli Hydro Power started in 1980, but was left between work due to the death of communist leader Enver Hoxha, and the beginning of a Transitional period until the 1990s that culminated in the overthrow of that system.

In October 2013, it was reported that the municipality debt was high and the municipality was close to bankruptcy due to poor management of funds by former mayor, Dritan Bici.

== Sports ==
The football (soccer) club is KF Gramshi that is in the Albanian Second Division.

== Notable people ==
- Adriatik Llalla, General Prosecutor of Albania, Inspector General of HIDAA
- Architect Kasemi, architect of the 16th century
- Ismail Qemali Gramshi, signatory of the Albanian Declaration of Independence
- Lorenc Trashi, footballer
- Erblira Bici, volleyball player
- Hamza Bey Gramshi, Led a major revolt in Tomorricë in 1570 against the Ottoman Empire. His grandson Ajaz Bey was also a notable from this region. They are the ancestors of the Frashëri Brothers, Abdyl Frashëri, Naim Frashëri and Sami Frashëri.
- Antonio Gramsci was an Italian Marxist philosopher, linguist, journalist, writer, and politician. His origin was Albanian from Gramsh town. He wrote on philosophy, political theory, sociology, history, and linguistics. He was a founding member and one-time leader of the Italian Communist Party. A vocal critic of Benito Mussolini and fascism, he was imprisoned in 1926, where he remained until his death in 1937.
- Kamber Dërmyshi was a patriotic figure in Albania, was born in Posnovisht village of Gramsh was a member and one of commanders of Albanian National Awakening.
- Çetiri brothers were a group of icon and fresco painters who for about 100 years (1762-1853) painted churches and houses of archons. Their work, from a quantitative point of view, is magnificent, and includes ecclesiastical icons, temple decorations and painted wooden iconostasis. The portraits they have created are over 3,000 throughout South Albania. In this period, the Çetiri family decorated more than 12 churches. Their work with painted pictures over the area of 2500 m2. This is all artistic creation is of great value for recording the folk culture of Myzeqe during the 18th and 19th centuries. Çetiri masters paint many churches and iconostases in Berat and Myzeqe, as well as in their hometown Grabovë, Gramsh.

== Twin towns – sister cities ==
Gramsh is twinned with:

- Plataci, Italy
