= Elbasan County =

County in central Albania

Elbasan County Qarku i Elbasanit (Albanian)
- County
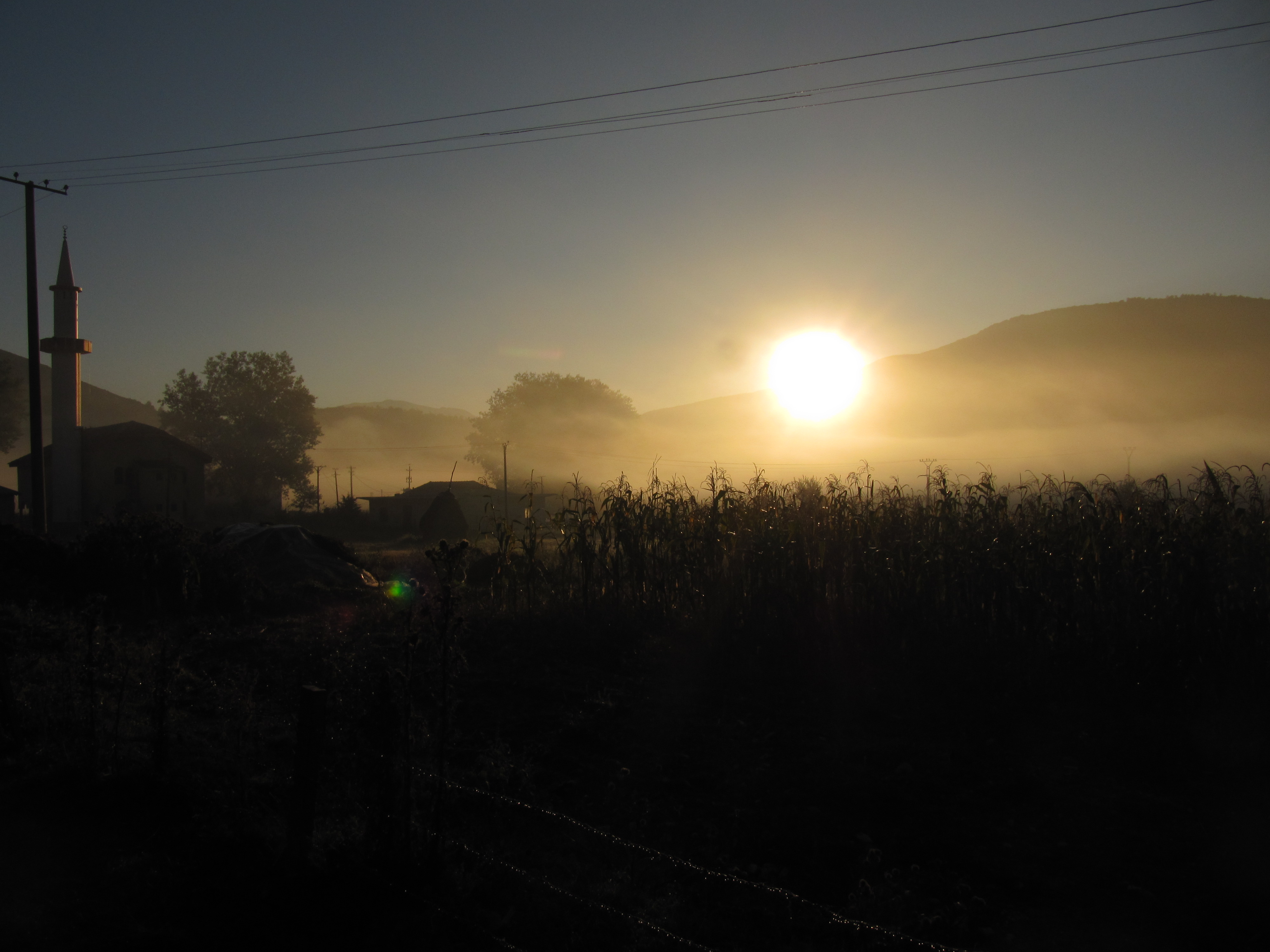

- Flag Emblem

- Coordinates: 41°0′N 20°10′E
- Country: Albania
- Seat: Elbasan
- Subdivisions: 7 municipalities, 385 towns and villages

Government
  - Council chairman: Ermira Urupi

Area
  - Total: 3,199 km^{2} (1,235 sq mi)

Population (2023)
  - Total: 232,580
  - Density: 72.70/km^{2} (188.3/sq mi)
- Time zone: UTC+1 (CET)
  - Summer (DST): UTC+2 (CEST)
- HDI (2023): 0.820 very high · 7th
- NUTS Code: AL021
- Website: Official Website

Elbasan County (Albanian: Qarku i Elbasanit) is one of the 12 counties of Albania. The population is 232,580 (as of 2023), in an area of 3199 km^{2}. Its capital is the city Elbasan.

== Administrative divisions ==
Until 2000, Elbasan County was subdivided into four districts: Elbasan, Gramsh, Librazhd, and Peqin. Since the 2015 local government reform, the county consists of the following 7 municipalities: Belsh, Cërrik, Elbasan, Gramsh, Librazhd, Peqin and Prrenjas. Before 2015, it consisted of the following 50 municipalities:

- Belsh
- Bradashesh
- Cërrik
- Elbasan
- Fierzë
- Funarë
- Gjergjan
- Gjinar
- Gjoçaj
- Gostimë
- Gracen
- Gramsh
- Grekan
- Hotolisht
- Kajan
- Karinë
- Klos
- Kodovjat
- Kukur
- Kushovë
- Labinot-Fushë
- Labinot-Mal
- Lenie
- Librazhd
- Lunik
- Mollas
- Orenjë
- Pajovë
- Papër
- Peqin
- Përparim
- Pishaj
- Polis
- Poroçan
- Prrenjas
- Qendër Librazhd
- Qukës
- Rrajcë
- Rrasë
- Shalës
- Shezë
- Shirgjan
- Shushicë
- Skënderbegas
- Steblevë
- Stravaj
- Sult
- Tregan
- Tunjë
- Zavalinë

The municipalities consist of about 385 towns and villages in total. See Villages of Elbasan County for a structured list.

== Demographics ==
Historical population
Year	Pop.	±%
1950	130,000	—
1960	160,849	+23.7%
1969	206,842	+28.6%
1979	281,769	+36.2%
1989	357,497	+26.9%
2001	362,736	+1.5%
2011	295,827	−18.4%
2023	232,580	−21.4%

Elbasan County has 232,580 inhabitants as of 2023. The county is 89.9% Albanian, 1.86% Roma and Balkan Egyptian, 0.17% Bulgarian, 0.06 other South Slavic (Serbs, Macedonians, and Bosniaks), 0.06% Aromanians, 0.06% Greeks, and the rest unidentified or of mixed ethnicities.

=== Religion ===
Between the 2011 and 2023 censuses in Elbasan, there were notable shifts in religious affiliation. The Sunni Muslim population decreased significantly from 64.4% to 52.9%, while Bektashi Muslims rose from 0.5% to 1.4%. The Catholic Christian population slightly declined from 1.0% to 0.7%, and Orthodox Christians remained stable at 5.2%. Evangelical Christians experienced a modest rise, from 0.1% to 0.3%.

There was a substantial increase in the irreligious population: atheists rose from 3.3% to 4.4%, and those identifying as believers without denomination grew significantly from 10.2% to 17.5%. Meanwhile, the "Not stated/other" category also saw an increase, rising from 15.3% to 17.5%.

Population of Elbasan according to religious group (2011–2023)
Religion group	Census 2011		Census 2023 (Revised Source)		Difference (2023−2011)	
Religion group	Number	Percentage	Number	Percentage	Number	Percentage
Sunni Muslim	190,550	64.4%	123,133	52.9%	-67,417	-11.5%
Bektashi Muslim	1,515	0.5%	3,186	1.4%	+1,671	+0.9%
Total Muslim	192,065	64.9%	126,319	54.3%	-65,746	-10.6%
Catholic Christian	3,054	1.0%	1,617	0.7%	-1,437	-0.3%
Orthodox Christian	15,295	5.2%	12,140	5.2%	-3,155	+0.0%
Evangelical	147	0.1%	679	0.3%	+532	+0.2%
Total Christian*	18,591	6.3%	14,624	6.3%	-3,967	+0.0%
Atheists	9,679	3.3%	10,167	4.4%	+488	+1.1%
Believers without denomination	30,161	10.2%	40,747	17.5%	+10,586	+7.3%
Total Non-religious	39,840	13.5%	50,914	21.9%	+11,074	+8.4%
Not stated / other**	45,331	15.3%	40,723	17.5%	-4,608	+2.2%
TOTAL	295,827	100%	232,580	100%	-63,247	–
