= Aromanians in Albania =

Romance-speaking ethnic minority in Albania

Aromanian: Rrãmãnji/Armãnji tu Arbinishii Albanian: Arumunët/Vllehët në Shqipëri
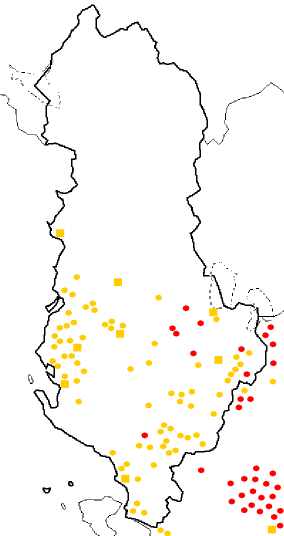
- Map of Aromanian settlements in Albania. (Red: Aromanians are the exclusive population in the settlement. Yellow: Aromanians form a majority or a substantial minority in the settlement)

Total population
- 2,459 (2023 census)

Regions with significant populations
- Southern Albania; Korçë County, Fier County, Gjirokastër County, Vlorë County, Berat County; Central Albania; Elbasan County, Durrës County, Tirana County

Languages
- Aromanian (native), Albanian

Religion
- Predominantly Eastern Orthodoxy

Related ethnic groups
- Aromanians

The Aromanians in Albania (Aromanian: Rrãmãnji/Armãnji tu Arbinishii; Albanian: Arumunët/Vllehët në Shqipëri) are an officially recognised ethnic minority in Albania.

== History ==
Mentions to Vlachs in what is modern-day Albania dates back to the Middle Ages, with Vlach (Latin-speaking) remnants of former Roman rule being noted among historical chroniclers.

Throughout the Ottoman period, Aromanians resided in modern-day Albania and Greece where they practiced transhumance. Some more settled Aromanians founded notable centers of culture such as Moscopole, which is situated in modern-day Albania, and reached its height in the 1700s. The town experienced a precipitous decline after attacks by Ali Pasha Tepelena's troops in the later half of that century, which saw a significant Aromanian diaspora to other Albanian towns, Greece, and Romania itself. Aromanians in Albania would later see a migration to the Myzeqe plains in the 1800s, alongside Tirana, Durrës and Elbasan. The Aromanians respectively assimilated into Albanian society and were engaged in running Esnafs, or Ottoman guild corporations.

After the 1878 League of Prizren, Aromanians in Albania were divided between pro-Romanian and pro-Hellenic factions. Many Aromanians sided with the Albanian nationalists, contributing not only to the revival of Albanian identity but also to counter Hellenism. Nonetheless, the elite of the community did hold pro-Hellenic leanings.

The Aromanians were first recognized at the London Conference of 1912–1913 as a minority group within Albania. During World War I, Moscopole was sacked by Albanian nationalists headed by Sali Butka in 1916 on suspicions that the local Aromanians were collaborating with Greek forces to seize southern Albania. However, in 1922, during the Congress of Lushnje, a significant number of Aromanian leaders (notably Taq Tutulani, among others) backed the Albanian Orthodox Church's creation and opposed Hellenism in Albania.

During the communist regime in Albania, the Aromanians were not recognised as a separate minority group. This was in spite of the fact that Aromanians played an active role in the Party of Labour's rise to power, as the party itself had a number of Aromanians in its upper strata. Throughout this era, and combined with the anti-religious persecution, the Aromanians of Albania were increasingly assimilated into mainstream Albanian society and the language rapidly declined.

Following the fall of communism in Albania, there was a revival of ethnic Aromanian identity in the country. Assimilation and identification have been and continue to be a complex issue relating to the Aromanians of Albania and the wider Balkans.

=== Historical settlements ===
==== Moscopole ====
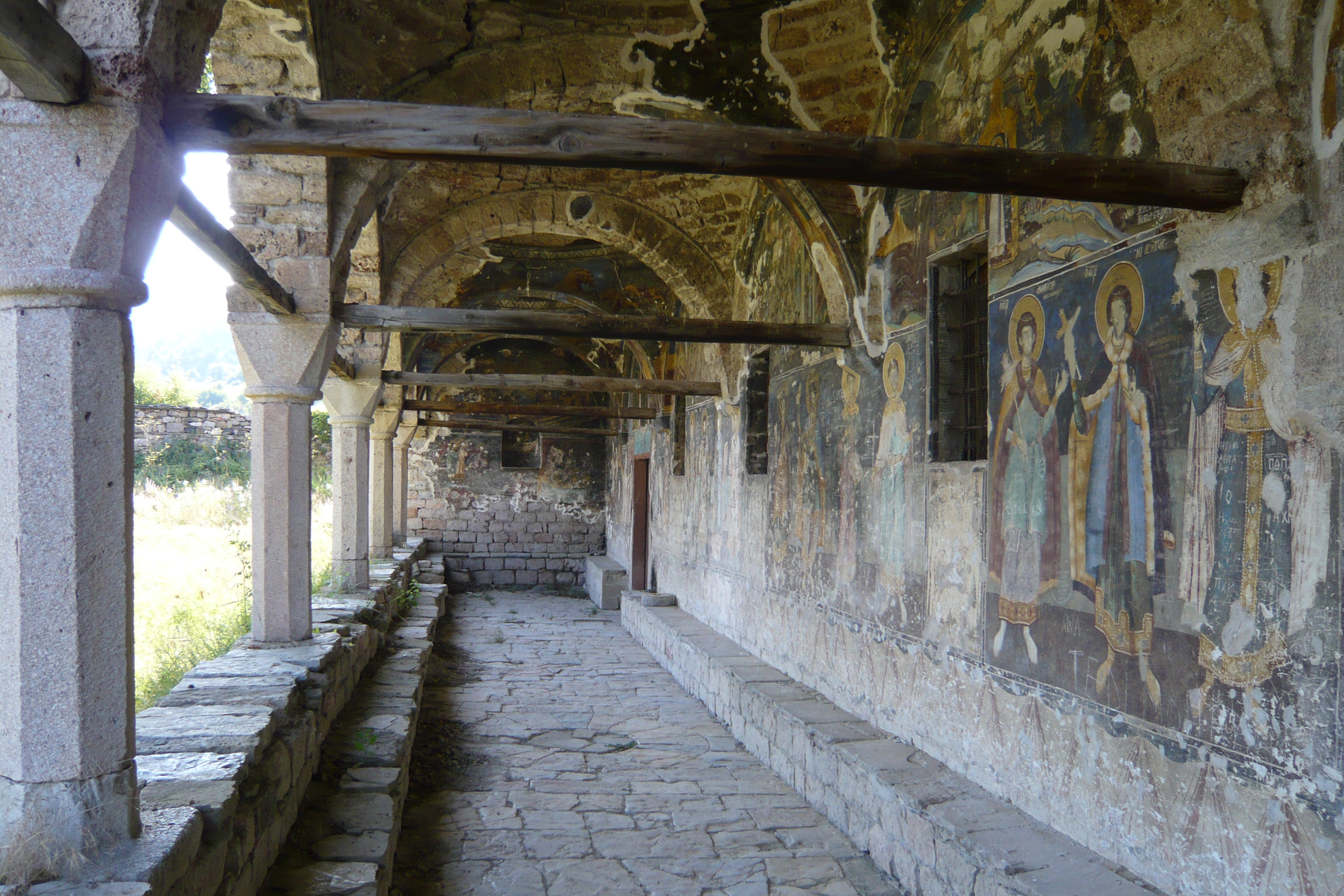
Decorated exonarthex of St. Athanasius' Church in Moscopole

The city of Moscopole (Albanian: Voskopojë) was once home to the largest Aromanian population in the world. It was the cultural and commercial centre of the Aromanians with a population of over 3,500 people. The city was sacked by Ali Pasha of Ioannina in 1788, causing an exodus of Aromanian people across the Balkans. Many of them ended up in what would become North Macedonia, Albania and Greece. The largest concentration of Aromanians was in the Pelister region of North Macedonia, the city of Kruševo and around the Lake Prespa. The Moscopolitans (Moscopoleanji in Aromanian), is one of the largest population of Aromanians today. They speak the Grabovean/Moscopolean dialect of Aromanian and are the descendants of the Graboveans/Moscopoleans in Krusevo (Aromanian: Crushuva, Macedonian: Крушево) are today a fully recognized minority group under the constitutional law of North Macedonia.

==== Grabova ====
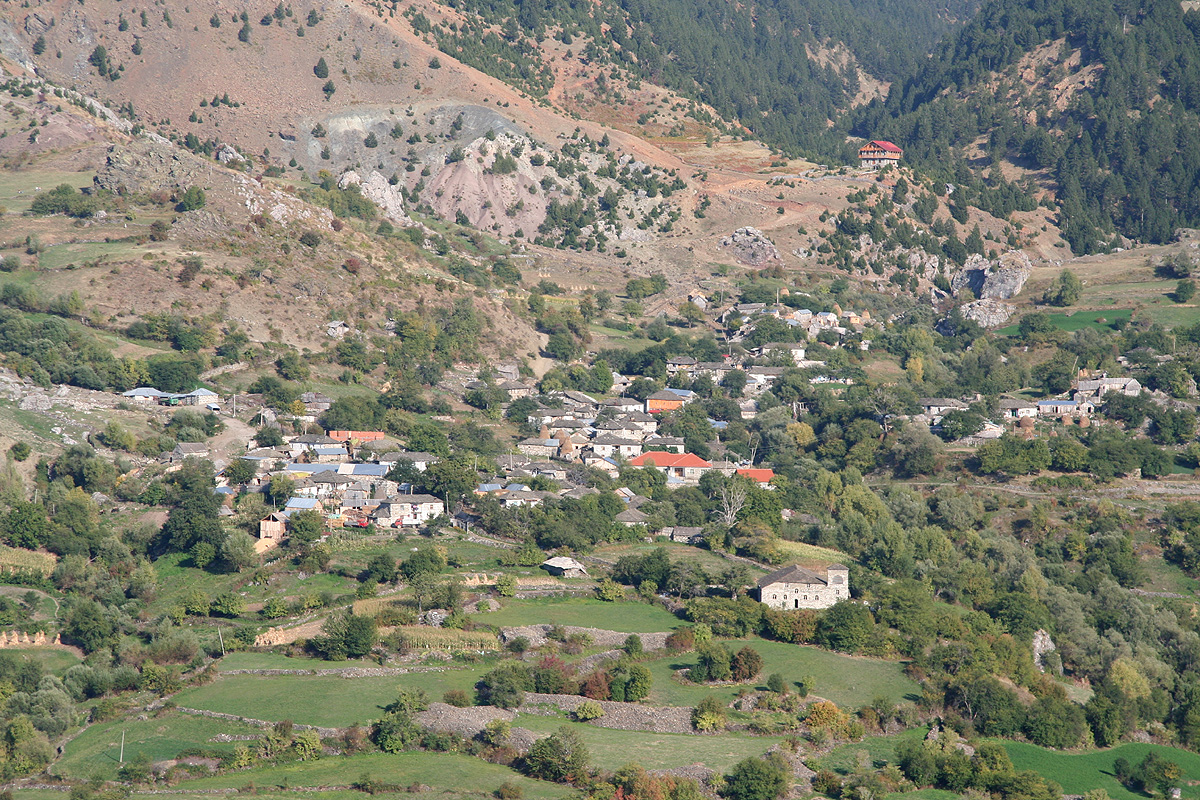
View of Grabova

Grabova was a medieval town created in the 10th century. Aromanians have left Grabova on several occasions, although the village has never been completely deserted. The first wave of depopulation took place in the 17th century, when Grabova shared the fate of Moscopole and during the inter-war period, starting with 1931, many of Grabovars emigrated to Elbasan and Lushnjë. In 1933, 15 families from the village emigrated to Romania; they initially settled in Southern Dobruja and then, in 1940, in the village of Nisipari, Constanța County, from where they moved to the larger nearby towns (Medgidia, Ovidiu, Constanța ) Another important immigration began in 1950, when communist authorities used the craftsmen from Grabova to build the industrial units in Korçë, Pogradec, Gramsh, Elbasan, and Tirana. The people of Grabova speak the Grabovean/Moscopolean dialect of Aromanian.

== Ethnonyms ==
The Aromanians in Albania are officially called the Minoriteti Vllah/Arumun. The local population often refers to them as Vllehë, Çobenjë (from Turkish çoban, "shepherd"), Xacët or Xinxarët, Gogët, and Llacifacët.

== Culture ==
=== Religion ===
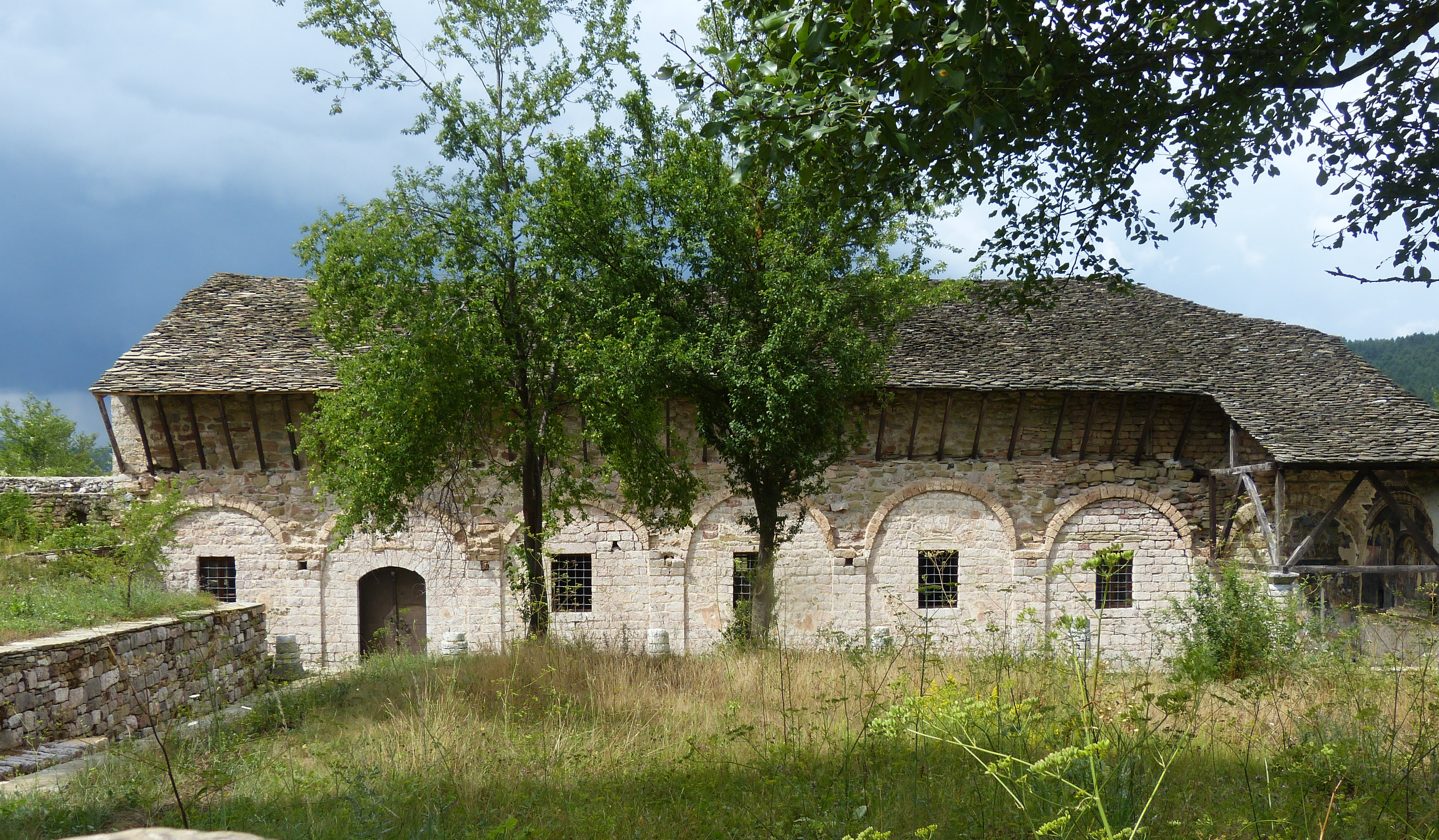
St. Mary's Church in Moscopole

Aromanians in Albania are predominantly Eastern Orthodox Christians like the rest of Aromanians. In Korçë (Aromanian: Curceaua, Curceauã, Curceau or Curciau), they have an Aromanian-language church named St. Sotir (Ayiu Sutir). First built in 1925, the church was demolished by the Albanian communist authorities in 1959. It was reconstructed from 1995 to 2005. The St. Sotir Church in Korçë is one of the few churches in Albania serving the Aromanian minority of the country.

=== Media ===
Aromanian-language media include the newspapers Popullorë and Ta Néa tis Omónias, both being pro-Greek. There are also the newspapers Frația Vëllazëria and Fratsilia which appear only irregularly, and also Fãrshãrotu and Arumunët/Vllehtë, as well as RTSH 2 and RTSH Gjirokastra. RTSH 2 broadcasts from Monday to Friday news and programms in Aromanian, while RTSH Gjirokastra broadcasts only on Saturdays. Beside TV media is also the internet radio RTV Armakedon.

=== Education ===
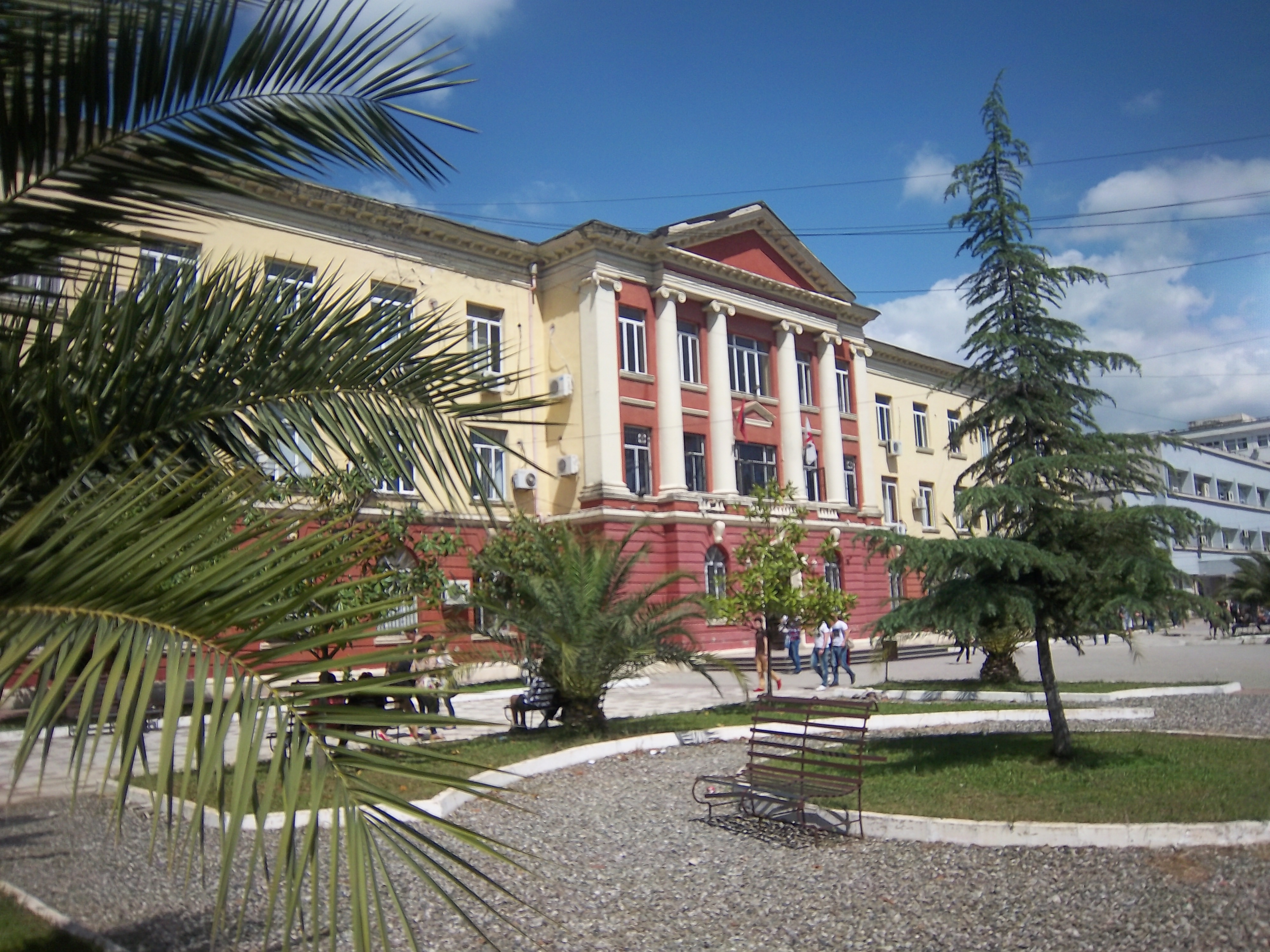
University of Tirana, Faculty of Foreign Languages

In the University of Tirana, the Aromanian language is covered by the Faculty of Foreign Languages.

== Demographics ==
In the 2023 census, 2,459 people declared themselves as Aromanians in Albania. 8,266 people declared themselves to be Aromanians in the 2011 census. On the quality of the specific data the Advisory Committee on the Framework Convention for the Protection of National Minorities stated that "the results of the census should be viewed with the utmost caution and calls on the authorities not to rely exclusively on the data on nationality collected during the census in determining its policy on the protection of national minorities.". In the context of the census conducted in 2011 in Albania, representatives of the Aromanian community in the country stated that the results do not reflect the real number of the Aromanian population of Albania.

According to Tom Winnifrith in 1995, that there were about 200,000 individuals who were of Aromanian descent in Albania, regardless of proficiency in Aromanian, or spoke Aromanian without necessarily considering themselves to have a separate identity. According to Frank Kressing and Karl Kaser in 2002, there were between 30,000 and 50,000 Aromanians in Albania. In 2004 Arno Tanner pointed out Albania as the only country where Vlachs make a relatively significant percentage of population, around 2%.

== List of settlements ==
In Albania, Aromanian communities inhabit Moscopole, their most famous settlement, the Kolonjë District (where they are concentrated), a quarter of Fier (Aromanian Ferãcã), while Aromanian was taught, as recorded by Tom Winnifrith, at primary schools in Andon Poçi near Gjirokastër, Shkallë (Aromanian Scarã) near Sarandë, and Borovë near Korçë (Curceaua, Curceauã, Curceau or Curciau) (1987). A Romanian research team concluded in the 1960s that Albanian Aromanians migrated to Tirana, Stan Karbunarë, Skrapar, Pojan, Bilisht and Korçë, and that they inhabited Karaja, Lushnjë, Moscopole, Drenovë and Boboshticë (Aromanian Bubushtitsa).

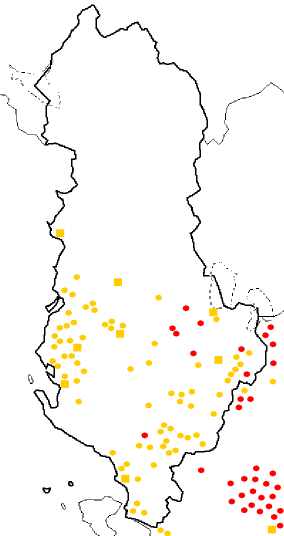
Aromanians are the exclusive population in the settlement Aromanians form a majority or a substantial minority in the settlement

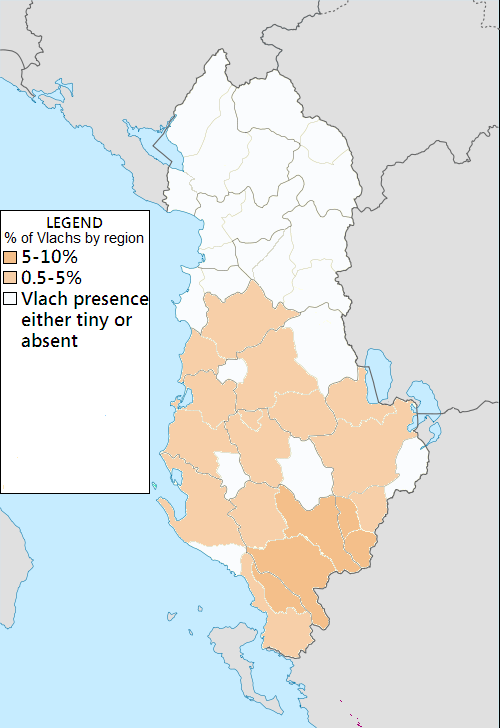
Percentage of Aromanians in Albanian counties, c.1900

=== Central Albania ===
The Myzeqe (Aromanian: Muzachia) is an area in southwestern-central Albania which encompasses parts of the county of Fier (Aromanian: Ferãcã) . It has a large Aromanian population spread across many villages. The Aromanian inhabitants of Myzeqe are referred to as Muzachiars or Muzachirenji in Aromanian.

- Grabovë e Sipërme (Aromanian: Greãva, Grabuva)

=== Berat County ===
- Vanë
- Sqepur
- Poshnje
- Ura Vajgurore
- Vertop
- Kucovë
- Protoduar

=== Vlorë County ===
- Selenicë (Aromanian: Selenitsa, Selenitsã/Selenitse)
- Xarrë (Aromanian: Dzara)
- Kardhikaq
- Zvërnec
- Skrofotinë
- Mekat
- Bestrovë
- Bunavi
- Lubonjë
- Beshisht
- Shkallë

=== Gjirokastër Country ===
- Gjirokastër
- Andon Poçi
- Humelicë (Aromanian: Umelitsa, Umelitse)
- Labovë
- Qestorat (Aromanian: Chiãsturat, Chiãsturata)
- Stegopul (Aromanian: Stãgopul)
- Saraqinisht
- Selckë
- Zagoria (Aromanian: Zaguria, Zagurii)
- Frashër (Aromanian: Farshar)
- Përmet
- Çarshovë (Aromanian: Ciarshova)
- Leusë

=== Korcë County ===
A large portion of Aromanians can be found in Southeastern Albania.

- Moscopole (Aromanian: Moscopole) once a prosperous Aromanian center and today's village of Voskopojë.
- Korçë (Aromanian: Curceaua, Curceauã, Curceau or Curciau)
- Vithkuq (Aromanian: Bitcuchi)
- Drenovë (Aromanian: Dãrnova)
- Boboshticë (Aromanian: Bubushtitsa)
- Dardhë
- Leskovik

== Minority status ==
The Aromanians were first recognized at the London Conference of 1912–1913 as a minority group until the communist era (1967). From 1967 until 1992, they were known as simple Albanians, and from 1992 until 2017, they were known as a cultural and linguistic minority. Since 2017, the Aromanians are an officially recognized ethnic minority in Albania.

The existing political divisions among the Aromanian population in Albania are the pro-Greek and Aromanian-only factions, which are the most numerous groups, as well as the pro-Romanian faction, the latter being less numerous. All of them promote their Aromanian ethnic background but differ on how they define their national identity. Namely, the pro-Greek group would concur with the majority of Aromanians in Greece that they are nationally Greek with Aromanian linguistic and cultural traits. On the other hand, those supporting a completely distinct Aromanian identity claim that they are both nationally and ethnically Aromanians and would deny having Greek or Romanian national consciousness.

== Politics ==
The Aromanians have their own political party in Albania. It is known as the Party of the Vlachs of Albania (PVSH), it was founded in 2011 and aims for the unification of all the Albanian Aromanians. There are only two other Aromanian political parties in the world, the Democratic Union of the Vlachs of Macedonia (DSVM) and the Party of the Vlachs of Macedonia (PVM), both in North Macedonia.

== Notable people from Albania ==
=== Academics ===
- Nicolae Ianovici, linguist
- Constantin Ucuta, academic and protopope

=== Art ===
- Albert Vërria (1936–2015), actor
- Sandër Prosi (1924–1985), actor
- Nikolla Zoraqi (1928–1991), composer
- Violeta Manushi (1926–2007), actress
- Margarita Xhepa (1932–2025), actress
- Ndricim Xhepa (b. 1957), actor
- Eli Fara (b. 1968), singer and songwriter
- Andrea Mano (1919–2000), sculptor
- Zhani Ciko (b. 1945)
- Janaq Paço (1914–1991), sculptor
- Jakov Xoxa (1923–1979), author and writer
- Parashqevi Simaku (b. 1966), musician
- Prokop Mima (1920–1986), actor
- Llambi Kaçani (1946–2004), actor
- Mihal Popi (1909–1979), actor, director and photographer
- Jovan Četirević Grabovan (1720–1790), icon painter

=== Education ===
- Daniel Moscopolites (1754–1825), scholar
- Aurel Plasari (b. 1956), intellectual
- Ilo Mitkë Qafëzezi (1889–1964), intellectual
- Mitrush Kuteli (1907–1967), writer, literary critic and translator
- Ioannis Chalkeus (1667–1730/40), scholar, philosopher and figure of the modern Greek Enlightenment
- Iuliu Valaori (1867–1936), professor

=== Finance ===
- Mocioni family, banking and philanthropist family

=== Military/resistance ===
- Margarita Tutulani (1925–1943), anti-fascist
- Kristaq Tutulani (1919–1943), anti-fascist
- Vasil Trasha (1926–1958), partisan and pilot
- Liri Gero (1926–1944), World War II martyr and heroine

=== Philanthropy ===
- Evangelis Zappas (1800–1865), businessman
- Konstantinos Zappas (1814–1892), benefactor

=== Politics ===
- Apostol Arsache (1789–1869), politician and philanthropist
- Dhimitër Tutulani (1857–1937), lawyer and politician
- Rita Marko (1920–2018), communist politician
- Teodor Heba (1914–2001), communist politician
- Nako Spiru (1918–1947), communist politician
- Llazar Fundo (1899–1944), communist, former member of the Balkan communist federation, purged in 1944
- Athanas Shundi (1892–1940), politician, pharmacist, and early supporter of the Albanian Orthodox Church

=== Religion ===
- Haralambie Balamaci (1850–1914), priest
- Damian of Albania (1886–1973), Archbishop of the Albanian Orthodox Church
- Nektarios Terpos (end 17th–18th century), priest and author
- Theodore Kavalliotis (1718–1789), priest and teacher
- Ioakeim Martianos (1875–1955), priest and teacher
- Dionysios Mantoukas (1648–1751), bishop

== Gallery ==
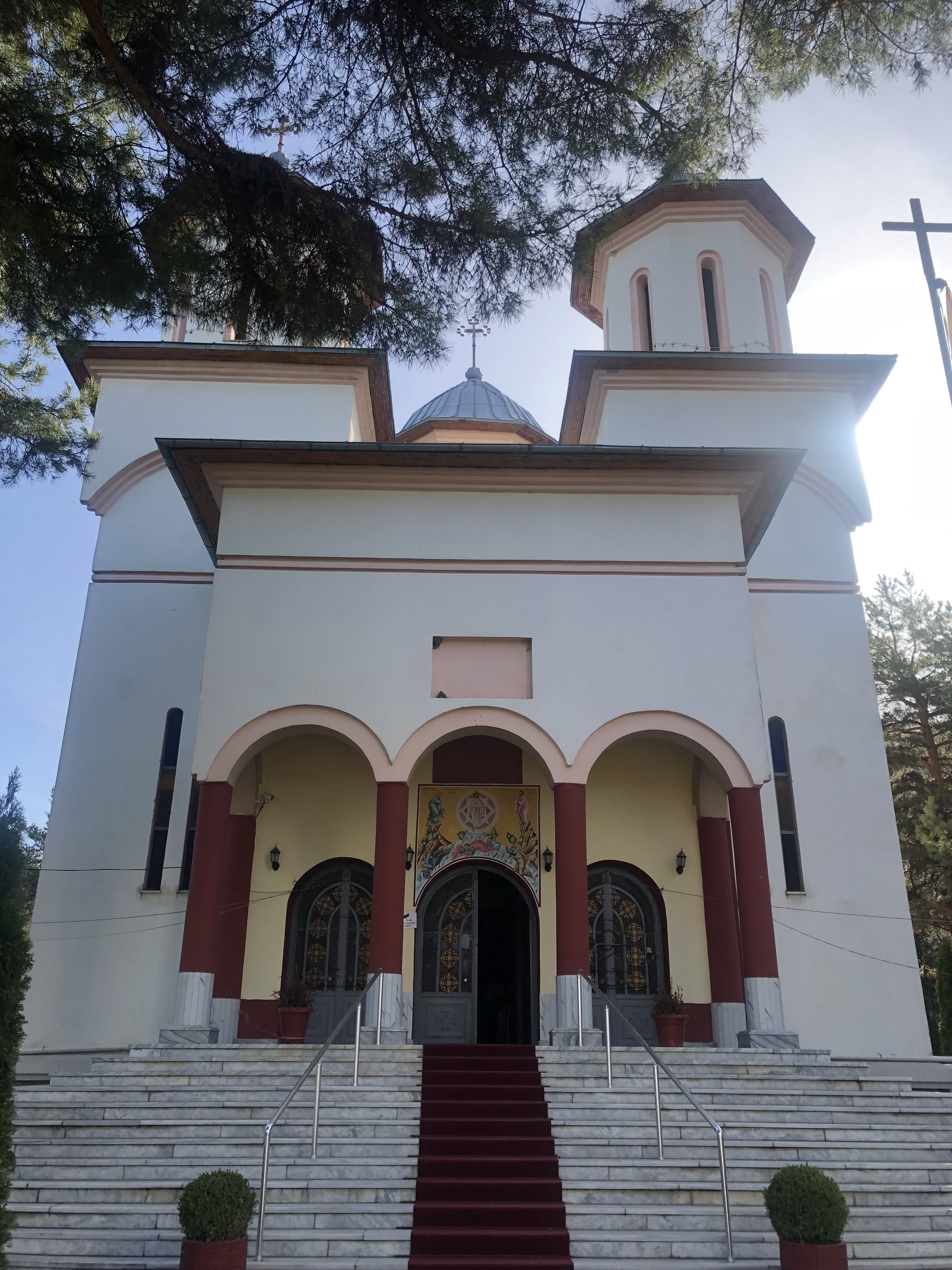
Aromanian church St. Sotir in Korçë

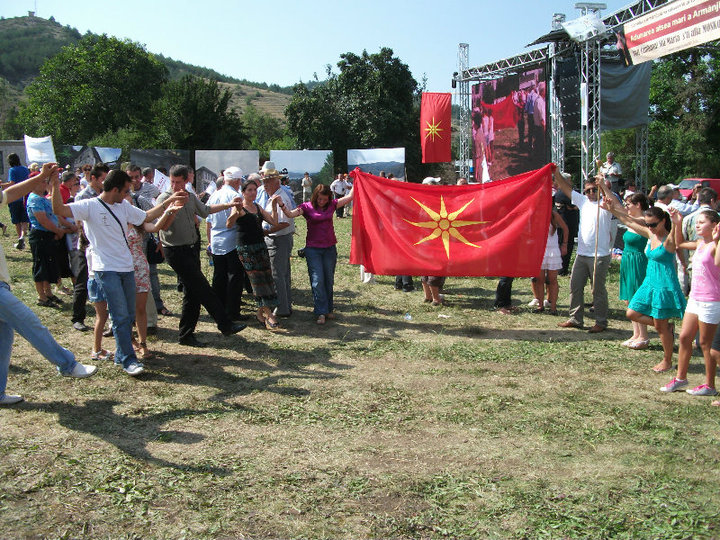
National Aromanian festival in Moscopole, 15 August 2010

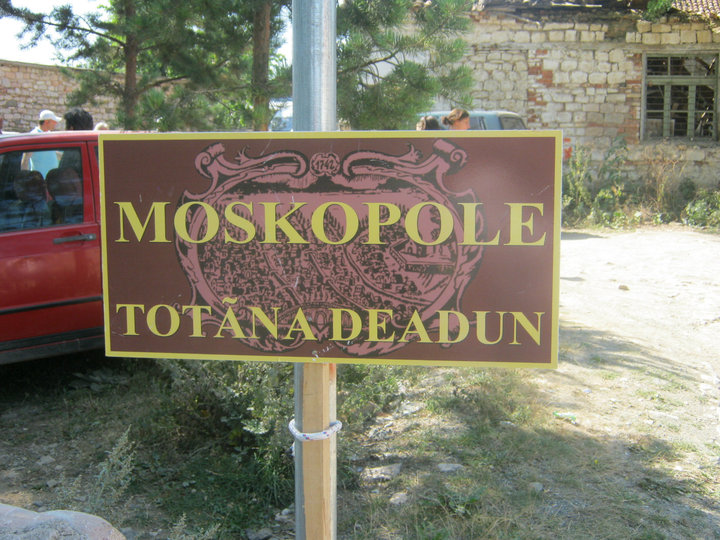
Sign in Aromanian language in Moscopole

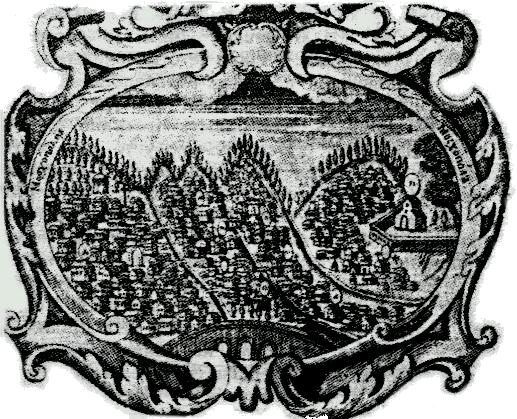
Moscopole at 1742

== See also ==
- Aromanians in Bulgaria
- Aromanians in Greece
- Aromanians in North Macedonia
- Aromanians in Romania
- Aromanians in Serbia
- Moscopole
