= Vien =

Vien may refer to:

- Vien (name)
- Vien (Hasidic community)
- Vien (Rabbinical dynasty)
- Vien+, an EP by Wire (band)

== See also ==
- Viens (disambiguation)
- Vein (disambiguation)
