= CET =

CET, cet, or Cet may refer to:

== Places ==
- Cet, Albania
- Cet, standard astronomical abbreviation for the constellation Cetus
- Colchester Town railway station (National Rail code CET), in Colchester, England

== Arts, entertainment, and media ==
- Comcast Entertainment Television, a Denver, Colorado TV station
- Community Educational Television, a station ownership arm of the Trinity Broadcasting Network
- Coventry Evening Telegraph, a newspaper in Coventry, England
- WCET-TV, a PBS station serving Cincinnati, Ohio

== Education ==
=== Schools ===
- College of Engineering, Trivandrum, in Kerala, India
- College of Engineering and Technology, in Bhubaneswar, Orissa, India

=== Tests ===
- College English Test, a national English examination in People's Republic of China
- Common Entrance Test, for prospective students seeking entry into institutes of higher education in India

== Technology ==
- Carrier Ethernet Transport, an Ethernet extension
- Center for Environmental Technology, a radio receiver designer
- Certified engineering technologist, a Canadian qualification
- Control-flow enforcement technology, a security technology by Intel
- Critical exposure temperature, a factor in determining the minimum design metal temperature
- FV180 Combat Engineer Tractor

== Other uses ==
- Caesars Entertainment Corporation, often abbreviated as "CET"
- Canadian Equestrian Team
- Carbon emissions trading
- Central England temperature, a set of monthly records dating back to the seventeenth century
- Central European Time, UTC+1:00
- Cognitive evaluation theory, a psychological theory explaining environment's effects on motivation
- Colombo Electric Tramways
- A common external tariff applied by a customs union
- Common Eligibility Test, an examination for government recruitment in India
- Cognitive Enhancement Therapy, a neurocognitive treatment based on cognitive remediation therapy
