= Viens =

Viens may refer to:

- Viens, Vaucluse, a commune in the department of Vaucluse in France
- Viens (surname)
- Viens, album by Ève Angeli
- Viens, 1997 album by Fēlikss Ķiģelis
- "Viens", song by Danyel Gérard

== See also ==
- Vein (disambiguation)
