= List of massacres in Albania =

The following is a list of massacres that have occurred in Albania (numbers may be approximate):

== Ottoman Period ==
Name	Date	Location	Deaths	Notes
Massacres of Albanians in the Balkan Wars	1912–1913	throughout Albania	up to 100,000 Albanians killed or died	Serbian, Greek and Montenegrin armies massacred Albanian civilians and many also died from hunger and sicknesses

== WWI ==
Name	Date	Location	Deaths	Notes
Hormova massacre	29 April 1914	Hormovë	217	Albanian men and boys were massacred by the Greek army in 1914.
Massacre at Panariti	10 July 1914	Panarit	375	Albanians were massacred by Greek forces during WWI.
Korça massacres	May 1914	Korçë	hundreds	Multiple massacres occurred in the district of Korçë against Albanians by Greek soldiers.

== WWII ==
Name	Date	Location	Deaths	Notes
Borovë massacre	9 July 1943	Borovë	107	Nazi German forces killed civilians as a reprisal for a partisan attack
4 February 1944 Tirana massacre	4 February 1944	Tirana	86	Police units under Interior Minister Xhafer Deva, collaborating with the Gestapo, killed 86 suspected anti-fascist residents

== Communist Period ==
Name	Date	Location	Deaths	Notes
Communist purges in Albania in 1944	November 1944	Tirana	over 150 political and religious executions	Killing of intellectuals and Catholic clergy after the liberation of Albania
Elimination of opposition in 1947	1947	Tirana	16	Killing of 16 non-communists in opposition
Qafë-Valmir massacre	17 August 1949	Qafë e Valmirit, Mirditë	14	The communist regime executed 14 men from the area in revenge for the murder of Bardhok Biba
1951 executions	26 February 1951	Tirana	22	Socialist People's Republic of Albania executed intellectuals without trial
April 2 massacre	2 April 1991	Shkodër	4	Killing of four Democratic Party protesters by shots fired from the Albanian Party of Labour (APL) headquarters during post-election demonstrations.
Libofshë massacre	29 April 1992	Libofshë	5	Five members of the Pupa family were bludgeoned to death during a robbery. The brothers Ditbardh and Josif Çuko were executed for the massacre, with their hanged bodies being displayed in public.

== Modern Period ==
Name	Date	Location	Deaths	Notes
Massacre of 28 February 1997	28 February 1997	Vlorë	9	
Massacre of Levan	28 March 1997	Levan	24	Violent clash where 24 people we killed; 18 Albanians and 6 Roma. The clash took place between Gang of Pusi i Mezinit and the Roma residents of the village of Levan, in Fier. It was part of the 1997 Albanian civil unrest.
Massacre of Cërrik	23 May 1997	Cërrik, Elbasan	6	22 wounded
Ura Vajgurore massacre	17 June 1997	Ura Vajgurore	5	Five people were killed and six wounded; all police officers. It was part of the Albanian civil unrest.
Durrës shootout	7 August 2009	Durrës	5	
2011 Albanian opposition demonstrations	21 January 2011	Tirana	4	Republican Guard opens fire on protesters, killing three on the spot and wounding another who died a week later in a coma.
Ujë i Ftohtë massacre	28 July 2013	Kalasë Beach, Ujë i Ftohtë, Vlora	3	Delin Hajdaraj executes three vacationers with automatic gunfire.
Çoles massacre	7 April 2015	Çoles neighborhood, Vlorë	3	Three young men – Albi Limaj, Haki Rakipi and Ardi Velaj – were killed after a trivial fight in a casino.
Lushnja massacre	11 October 2017	Lushnja	2	The armed attack resulted in the death of two people and injuries to two others.
Resulaj shooting	10 August 2018	Resulaj, Selenicë, Vlorë County	8	Ritvan Zykaj shoots and kills 8 of his relatives using a Kalashnikov
Dan Hutra femicides	1 March 2023	Tirana surroundings	3	41-year-old Dan Hutra killed three women and injured others in a series of attacks in the surroundings of Tirana.
Shkodër massacre	30 October 2024	Dobraç, Shkodër	4	Four people killed by a criminal group
