= Ķiģelis =

Ķiģelis (feminine: Ķiģele) is a Latvian masculine surname. It may refer to:

- Fēlikss Ķiģelis, Latvian rock musician
- Ēriks Ķiģelis, Latvian rock musician, founder of hard rock band Līvi (lv:Ēriks Ķiģelis)
