= Goriçan =

- Village
- Location within Albania
- Coordinates: 40°49′13″N 19°46′43″E
- Country: Albania
- County: Berat
- Municipality: Dimal
- Administrative unit: Kutalli
- Time zone: UTC+1 (CET)
  - Summer (DST): UTC+2 (CEST)

Goriçan is a village in the former municipality of Kutalli in Berat County, Albania. At the 2015 local government reform it became part of the municipality Dimal.
