= Borovë massacre =

Atrocity during World War II

- Part of World War II in Albania
- Location: 40.3108°N 20.6525°E; Borovë, Albania
- Date: 6 July 1943
- Target: Albanian civilians
- Attack type: Mass murder
- Deaths: 107 civilians
- Perpetrator: Wehrmacht

The Borovë massacre occurred on July 6, 1943, in the village of Borovë, during the Second World War in southeastern Albania. German forces killed 107 civilians as a reprisal for a Partisan attack on a German convoy in the village of Barmash.

== Attack on the convoy ==
In July 1943, Albania was still under Italian occupation. The German forces of the 98th Regiment of the First Mountain Division, then based in Montenegro following Operation Schwarz, were passing through Albania to regroup with the main forces in Ioannina, in Nazi-occupied Greece. They entered into the Korçë region from the Yugoslav Macedonian Skopje by way of Florine. Before they could cross back into Greek territory, they were attacked on two sides near the village of Borovë by Albanian partisans of the Albanian National Liberation Movement, led by Riza Kodheli. After the battle, which lasted for several hours, the German convoy was able to rest and then continue to its destination after Italian reinforcements joined. The Partisans may have inflicted heavy losses on the Germans, destroying most of the vehicles and military equipment and killing more than 60 men. However, these numbers may have come from the Partisans; Nazi German Major Reinhald Klebe reported four light injuries among the Axis soldiers.

== Reprisal ==
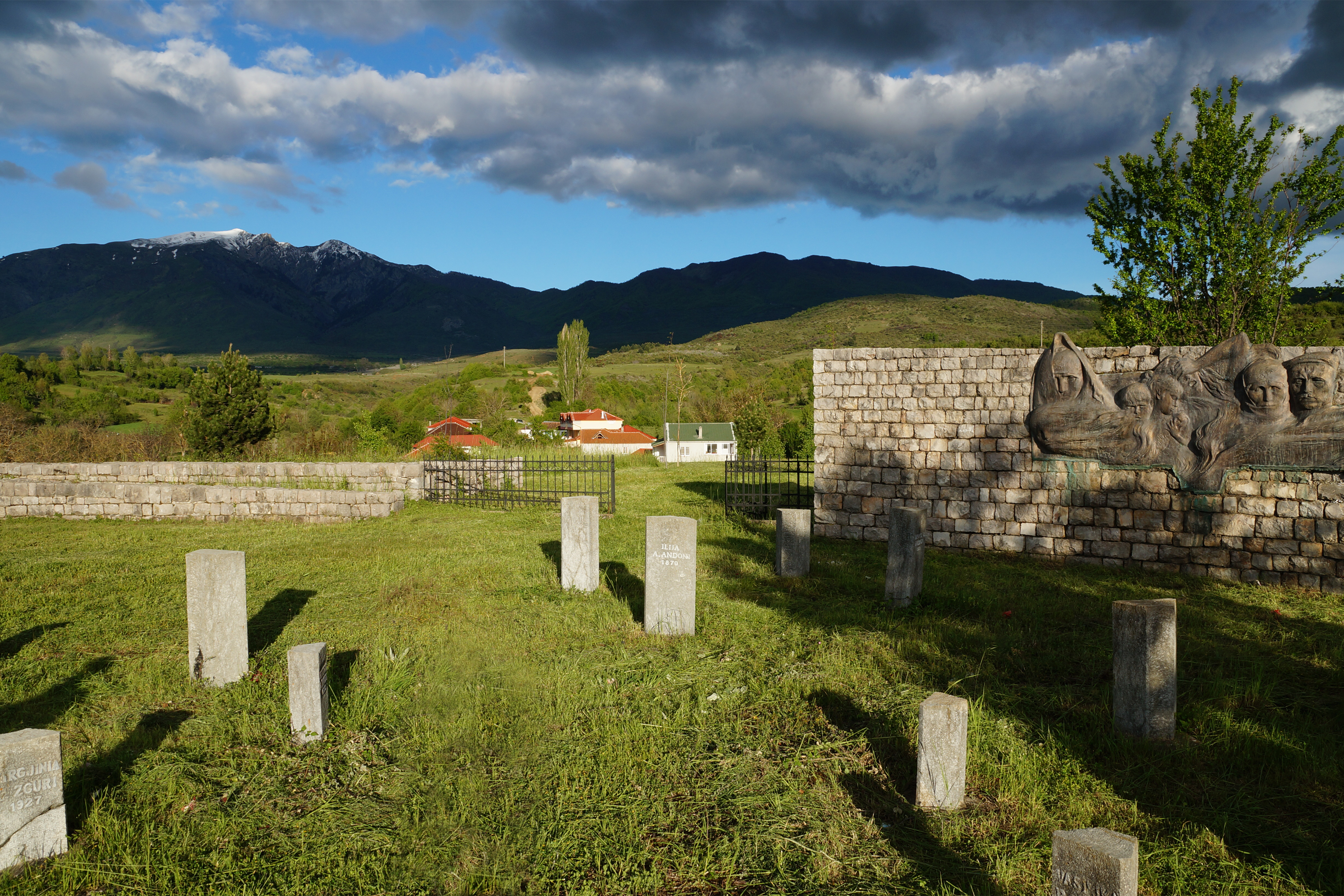
Memorial site in Borovë

After the report of the attack, a German expedition was sent from Greece to the place where the attack happened. In reprisal, the German forces, armed with flamethrowers, set every house in the village on fire. The German forces massacred all the inhabitants of the village of Borovë that they could find on that day. Some of the victims were shot and killed, while many were grouped inside the village church and burned alive. The death toll amounted to 107 civilians: mostly old, children and women. The neighbouring village of Barmash, also suffered from the reprisal, with the Nazis massacring 18 civilians, before departing to Greece.

== Legacy ==
In 1972, the Albanian composer Thoma Gaqi wrote a symphonic poem, Borova, in commemoration of the victims.

== See also ==
- List of massacres in Albania

== Sources ==
- Pearson, Owen (2006). Albania in the Twentieth Century, A History: Volume II: Albania in Occupation and War, 1939-45. I.B.Tauris. ISBN 9781845111045.
