= Vinen =

Vinen is a surname. Notable people with the surname include:

- Joe Vinen (1930–2022), British physicist specializing in low temperature physics
- Richard Vinen, British historian of King's College London

== See also ==
- Vien (name)
- Viner
