= Cete =

Cete may refer to:

== People ==
- Çetes, Muslim irregulars active in Anatolia in the early 20th century

== Surname ==
- Duygu Çete (born 1989), Turkish female Paralympic judoka

== Places ==
- Çetë, Kavajë, a village in the municipality of Kavajë, Tirana County, Albania
- Çetë, Berat, a village in the municipality of Dimal, Berat County, Albania
- Çetë, Korçë, a village in the municipality of Devoll, Korçë County, Albania
- Cete, Portugal

== Biology ==
- The English collective noun for a group of badgers
- Cete (clade), former mammalian clade that encompassed Cetacea (whales, dolphins, and porpoises) and Mesonychia (extinct carnivorous ungulates)
