= Banaj =

- Village
- Location within Albania
- Coordinates: 40°49′29″N 19°50′21″E
- Country: Albania
- County: Berat
- Municipality: Dimal
- Administrative unit: Poshnjë

Population
  - Total: 2,500
- Time zone: UTC+1 (CET)
  - Summer (DST): UTC+2 (CEST)

Banaj is a village in Berat County, central Albania. At the 2015 local government reform it became part of the municipality Dimal.
