= Vanes (disambiguation) =

Vanes or Vanes Martirosyan was an Armenian-born American professional boxer.

Vanes may also refer to:

- Archie Vanes (born 16 September 2001), English professional rugby union player
- Plural of "Vane"
- Truncated form of the Armeninan given name Hovanes/Hovhannes
- Vanes-Mari du Toit (born 2 August 1989), South African former netball player

== See also ==
- Syron Vanes, Swedish heavy metal band
