= Borovë =

Borovë or Borova may refer to the following places:

- Borovë, Korçë, a village in the municipality of Kolonjë, Korçë County, Albania
- Borovë, Elbasan, a village in the municipality of Librazhd, Elbasan County, Albania
- Borovë, Kosovo, a village in the municipality of Leposavić, Mitrovica District, Kosovo
