= Donofrosë =

- Village
- Location within Albania
- Coordinates: 40.74°N 19.79°E
- Country: Albania
- County: Berat
- Municipality: Dimal
- Administrative unit: Cukalat

Population (2011)
  - Total: 729
- Time zone: UTC+1 (CET)
  - Summer (DST): UTC+2 (CEST)

Donofrosë is a village in the former municipality of Cukalat in Berat County, Albania. At the 2015 local government reform it became part of the municipality Dimal.
