= Gorican =

Gorican may refer to:

- Goričan, Croatia
- Goriçan, a village in Albania
