= Ura Vajgurore massacre =

Massacre in Albania

The Massacre of Ura Vajgurore occurred on 17 June 1997 in the town of Ura Vajgurore, Berat County, during the 1997 Albanian civil unrest. Five people were killed and six wounded, all police officers.

== Event ==
The armed clash started at 11:55 the morning, after many election rallies of political parties. That day, in this town were Fatos Nano, chairman of the Socialist Party of Albania at the time, accompanied by Skender Gjinushi, while the municipality Poshnje Democratic Party of Albania represented in the late rally Azem Hajdari and Genc Pollo. After the two rallies, the Democratic Party of Albania escort was removed and after it came Fatos Nano and Skender Gjinushi and members of other supporters of this party. At the time, gangs control the city, after the opening of the military depots. Socialist Party of Albania leaders after the rally in Berat had left the city to continue the path toward Fier.

Escort that accompanied the Socialist Party of Albania leader, arrived at the Bridge Vajgurore, when a teenager shot to the cluster of Protoduarëve guards who said they were supporting the Democratic Party. Located on the roof of the villa, Protoduarëve guards killed a 17-year-old. Part of the escort, he could pass the villa went to Berat and received large reinforcements arms ammunition and men. While the rest remained behind, gathered in the square before the fuel-watchers. Some people kidnapped a police armored car, threatening blue uniforms and under the orders of civilian police Blindi left on Protoduarëve villas. Villa guards shot the tank with anti tank shells, without knowing that inside were policemen. Two of the officers, Miltiadh Koçi and Arjan Shemuni were burned inside tank, the other two Selami Aslan and Ilia Bano were killed by the flames went out Blindi. On the other hand, the guards of the villa, situated between two fires, could be withdrawn, but not all. One of them was detained prisoner by opponents and executed. His body was then tied a cars, with which creep up in Berat, where it burned. Witnesses have indicated that the protagonists of this massacre, but also other serious events, were supporters of the two main parties in the country, the Socialist Party of Albania and Democratic Party of Albania.

== Casualties and sentencing ==
The following people were killed:

- Miltiadh Koçi, police officer
- Arjan Shemuni, police officer
- Asllan Selami, police officer
- Ilia Bano, police officer
- Guard of the Protoduarëve Vila, unidentified

The following people were injured:

- Thimi Tanku, police officer
- Ylli Dhamo, police officer
- Neim Gjeroveni, police officer
- Ëngjëllush Pasha, police officer
- Arben Bega, police officer
- Shkëlqim Selfo, police officer

The following people were sentenced:

- Musa Protoduari, life imprisonment
- Shkëlqim Protoduari, life imprisonment
- Fran Marashi, life imprisonment
- Fatbardha Protoduari, life imprisonment, wife of Musa Protoduari
- Sokol Ndreu 30 years imprisonment
- Gjovalin Ndreu 25 years imprisonment
- Preng Miri 20 years imprisonment
- Gjelosh Miri 20 years imprisonment

== See also ==
- List of massacres in Albania
