= Ura Vajgurore =

Dimal
- Administrative unit
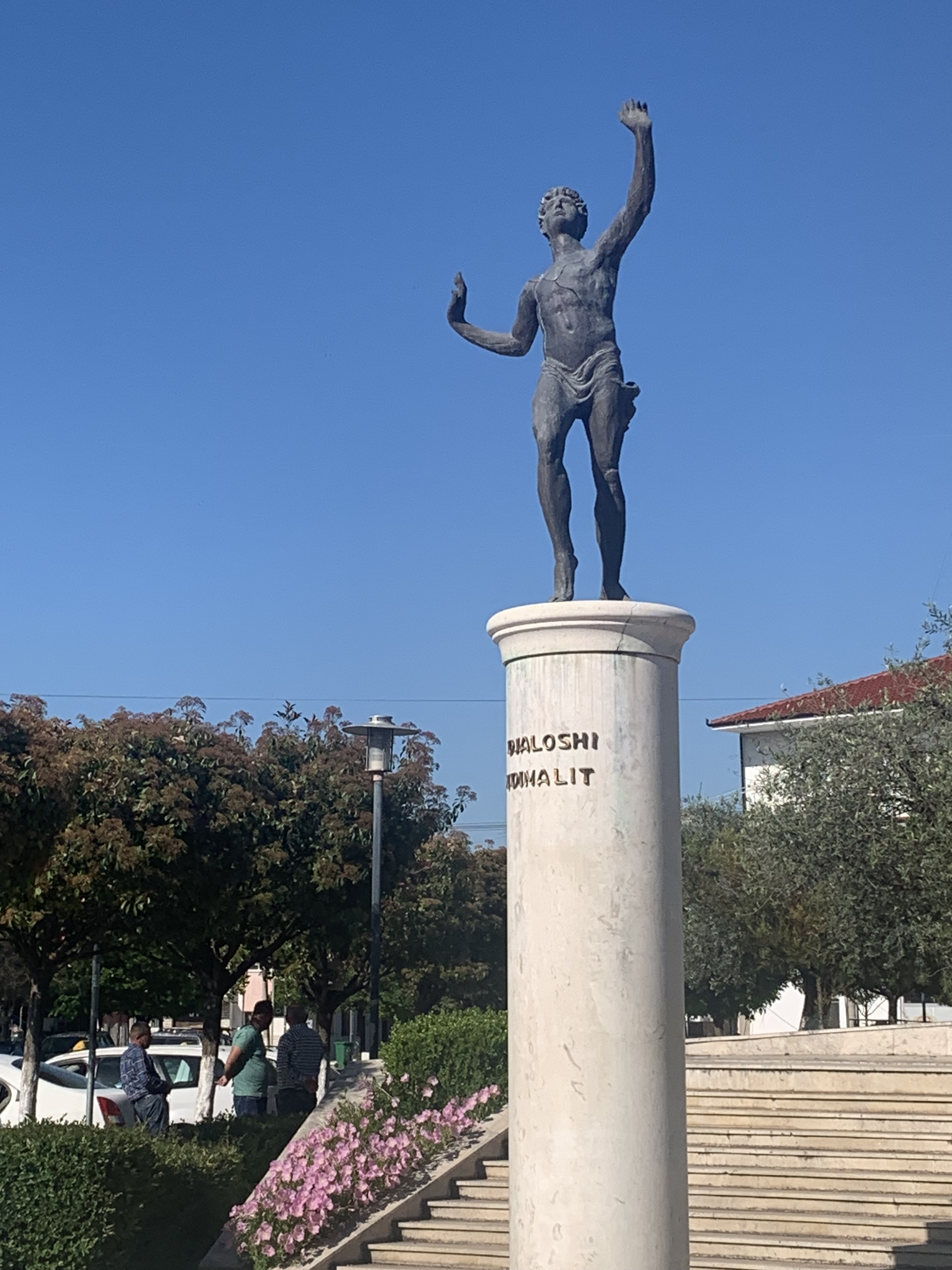
- City Center

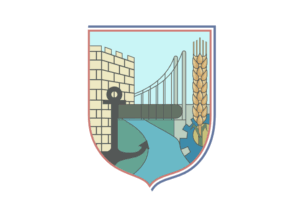
- Flag Emblem

- Location within Albania
- Coordinates: 40°46′N 19°53′E
- Country: Albania
- County: Berat
- Municipality: Dimal

Population (2011)
  - Administrative unit: 7,232
- Time zone: UTC+1 (CET)
  - Summer (DST): UTC+2 (CEST)
- Postal Code: 5007
- Area Code: (0)361
- Website: Official Website

Dimal formerly known as Ura Vajgurore, or as Ura e Hasan Beut, is a town in Berat County, central Albania. At the 2015 local government reform it was merged with the former municipalities (now municipal units) Cukalat, Kutalli and Poshnjë to form a new municipality, that was officially renamed to Dimal in April 2021. The seat of the municipality Dimal is the town Ura Vajgurore, that was not renamed in 2021. The population at the 2011 census was 7,232.

== History ==
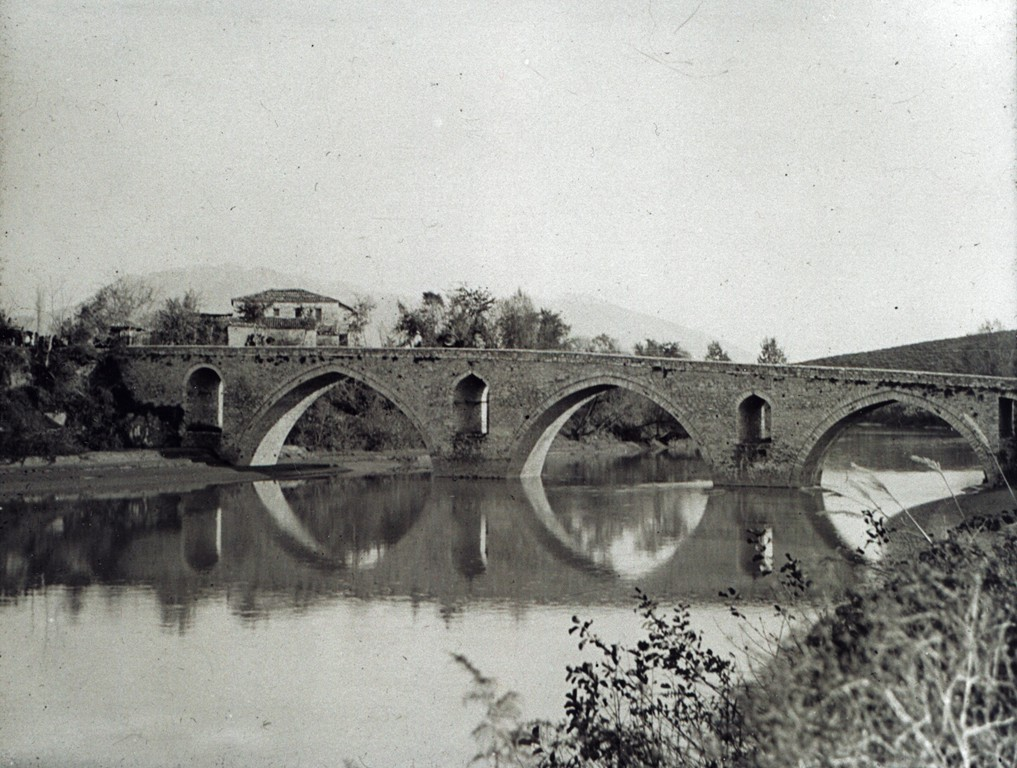
Old Gorica Bridge

Ruins in the style of the old Gorica bridge in Berat attest to the existence of early inhabitants and what would later become the town today. The contemporary city has its origins in recent displacements of residents from nearby villages over the last 100 years. The building of bridges has been the mark of continuity in the town's history. Known by various names, such as Bridge of Hasan Bey, the contemporary name comes from a cement and iron bridge believed to have been built by the Italians as infrastructure for oil pipelines that connected Kuçovë with Vlorë. Local residents call it the "Old Bridge." Today it is a small town, often considered as a crossroad between Berat and Kuçovë.

Dimal was the scene of violent riots in 1997 between supporters of the political parties PS and PD, in the context of the Albanian unrest of 1997 that was ignited by failing pyramid schemes. Four police officers were killed and six others were injured.

== Geography ==
The town is situated on both banks of the river Osum, at the foot of low mountains.

== Demographics ==
The population is composed of a mix between locals who are from the other side of town, with predominantly Orthodox surnames, and migrants of the 1960s onwards who originate from villages near Berat, and nearby villages such as Fief, Kutalli, Konizbalte, etc.. Primarily a middle to low-aged population, similar to other Albanian communities in transition, Ura Vajgurore has witnessed an increase in external and internal migration, and immigration of people from mountainous villages of Berat. The economy has long been recognized for surface mining of stone, and recently for processing granulated stone, lime, etc.. The main activities are trade, transport, etc..

== Culture ==
The town contains a number of educated residents with higher education in distinction to the rest of the population. There are a few notable personalities that originate from this city, like Llazar Fype (writer). Of considerable notoriety is the local Polyphonic Albanian folk music group.

== Notable people ==
- Llazar Fype, writer
