= St. Sotir Church, Korçë =

Eastern Orthodox church in Korçë, Albania

St. Sotir Church
- Transfiguration Church
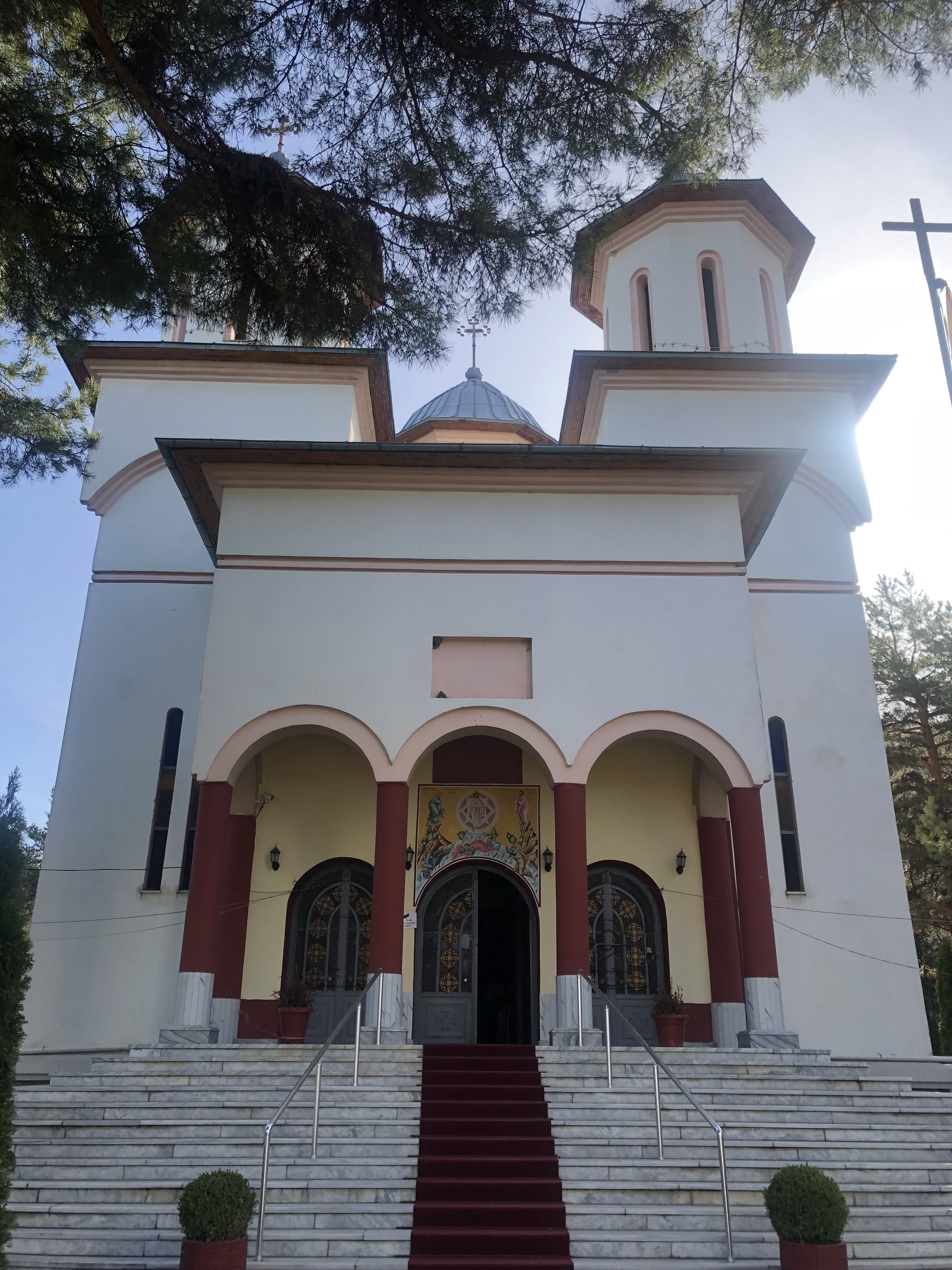
- Façade of the church
- St. Sotir Church
- 40°37′29.7″N 20°47′2.9″E
- Location: Korçë
- Country: Albania
- Language(s): Albanian, Aromanian and Romanian
- Denomination: Eastern Orthodox

History
- Consecrated: 25 October 1925 (original church); 2 June 2024 (new church)

Architecture
- Functional status: Active
- Groundbreaking: 6 March 1921 (original church); 8 October 1995 (new church)
- Completed: 1925 (original church); 2005 (new church)
- Demolished: 1959 (original church)

Clergy
- Priest: Andrea Zhurka

The St. Sotir Church (Note: Albanian: Kisha e Shën Sotirit; Aromanian: Bãsearica Ayiu Sutir; Romanian: Biserica Sfântul Sotir.) or Transfiguration Church (Note: Albanian: Kisha e Metamorfozës së Shpëtimtarit; Aromanian: Bãsearica Alãxearea a Prosuplui; Romanian: Biserica Schimbarea la Față.) is an Eastern Orthodox church serving the Aromanian community in the city of Korçë (Aromanian: Curceaua, Curceauã, Curceau or Curciau), Albania. The church was built between 1995 and 2005 with support from Romania. Its first priest was Dhimitraq Veriga, who was ordained priest in Romania and performed religious services in both Albanian and Aromanian. Romanian is also used during the church's services. The church has become an important center of cultural activities for the Albanian Aromanian minority, and it has maintained close contact with institutions and representatives from Romania.

There had already been a church, in a different location in Korçë and also with St. Sotir as its patron, for the Aromanian community of the town. It was completed in 1925 following decades of fundraising and construction. Its construction started at the initiative of the Aromanian priest Haralambie Balamaci, who was murdered before its completion in 1914 by Greek andartes fighters and pro-Greek Aromanians. He is today remembered in the modern St. Sotir Church through annual memorial services and a bust near the church. The original St. Sotir Church was damaged by an earthquake in 1931. Its building was demolished in 1959 by order of a local official of Albania's communist regime.

== History ==
=== Original church ===
The original St. Sotir Church at the moment of its inauguration ceremony on 25 October 1925

In 1905, Aromanian priest Haralambie Balamaci (also known by the name of Papa Lambru) established a chapel in his house in Korçë (Aromanian: Curceaua, Curceauã, Curceau or Curciau), then in the Ottoman Empire and now in Albania. As Balamaci had the long-term plan of building a church for the Aromanians of the town, he went afterwards to Bucharest in Romania to collect money for this aim. He had already collected some funds (more precisely, 1,497 Romanian lei) from 1886 to 1903 for planned buildings for the Aromanians through the society Diștiptarea ("The Awakening"), which he had founded on 18 December 1886. Balamaci stayed in Bucharest for around a year, during which he bought a 763 square metres (8,210 square feet) plot of land in Korçë from a native of the town living in Bucharest to build the church. He collected 4,607 lei from Aromanians as well as Albanians (including future Prime Minister of Albania Pandeli Evangjeli) in Bucharest. These funds and those obtained through Diștiptarea were either saved for the future church or used for the chapel and a school for the Aromanians of Korçë. The latter also functioned at Balamaci's house, and he aimed to erect a building for it as well.

On 15 November 1909, a seven-member committee, of which Balamaci was the president, was established by the community of pro-Romanian Aromanians of Korçë to open subscription lists to help fund an Aromanian church for the town. The church's construction was budgeted at some 60,000 lei, and by early 1912, 22,183 additional lei had been raised from Korçë, Bucharest and various cities in the United States. The Romanian–Aromanian newspaper Peninsula Balcanică ("The Balkan Peninsula") helped fund the project through the release of a promotional brochure. Sold for one leu, the funds obtained with the brochure were donated for the construction of the church. According to Romanian Aromanian professor Alexandru Gica, Balamaci's brother Epaminonda was probably the brochure's author. He was the attorney-in-fact of Korçë's pro-Romanian Aromanian community for launching subscription lists and collecting money donated for the church's construction.

In December 1912, during the First Balkan War, Greece occupied Korçë, and the construction of the church was stopped. Subsequently, on 23 March 1914, Balamaci and his brother Sotir, as well as other members of the Aromanian community of Korçë, were murdered in an attack against the community by a band of Greek andartes fighters and pro-Greek Aromanians. The perpetrators put in the brothers' pockets photos of the Greek bishop Photios of Korytsa, the Metropolitan of Korçë, suggesting that the act was a reprisal for the metropolitan's murder in September 1906. (Note: Albanian nationalist fighter Bajo Topulli had claimed in November 1906 that his band, led by his brother Çerçiz, was responsible for Photios' death. Legends among the Aromanians attributed the murder to Tanasi Nastu or to Apostoli Nastu (nicknamed Cușcona), both of whom were Aromanian armatole fighters. The latter person appears to have been part of the Topulli brothers' band, but Aromanian legends said he killed Photios alone. Romanian Aromanian professor Alexandru Gica noted that Balamaci was close to the people who killed Photios or who claimed to have done so, but stated that he did not believe Balamaci had anything to do with the murder. Gica remarked that information regarding Photios' death is contradictory.) Furthermore, according to eyewitnesses, as Balamaci was being taken away to be killed, some in the band shouted loudly that Balamaci was a "propagator and apostle of Romanianism". Balamaci's killers also robbed his house, stealing funds destined for institutions for the Aromanians of Korçë. Some 35,000 lei had been collected for the church at the time of his murder. As a result of the robbery, the completion of the church was delayed. Balamaci was buried in the vacant site where the church was being built.

The church's groundbreaking (the start of its construction) took place on 6 March 1921. Its construction was finally completed in 1925. The church was located at the intersection of the Republika Boulevard with Pandeli Cale Street in modern Korçë, near today's Majestic movie theatre. It was consecrated on 25 October 1925, and had St. Sotir (sōtḗr meaning "Saviour" in Ancient Greek) as its patron. On the same day, a bust of Balamaci located within the precinct of the church was unveiled. The event was attended by the Romanian minister plenipotentiary to Tirana, Simion Mândrescu. The church was severely damaged by an earthquake on 28 January 1931. Posteriorly, a small chapel was built next to the damaged church in which priest Cotta Balamace served. It is he who succeeded Haralambie in providing religious services to the Aromanians of Korçë, having been quickly ordained a priest in 1914 to take Haralambie's place.

In 1959, during Albania's communist regime, the chief of the committee for Korçë of the ruling Party of Labour of Albania ordered the demolition of the church's crumbling building. A three-story residential block was built in its place. The chief's father was among those who murdered Balamaci. He exhumed Balamaci's bones and broke them as reported by Gica, quoting the account of a relative of Haralambie, Nick Balamaci. Nick did not want to mention the name of this chief, which was interpreted and praised by Gica as an attempt to leave behind the grudges of the past. Marioara Balamace, Haralambie's granddaughter, took her grandfather's remains and reburied in 1962. In 1970, the Albanian communist authorities decided to bury Balamaci in the Martyrs' Cemetery in Korçë.

=== New church ===
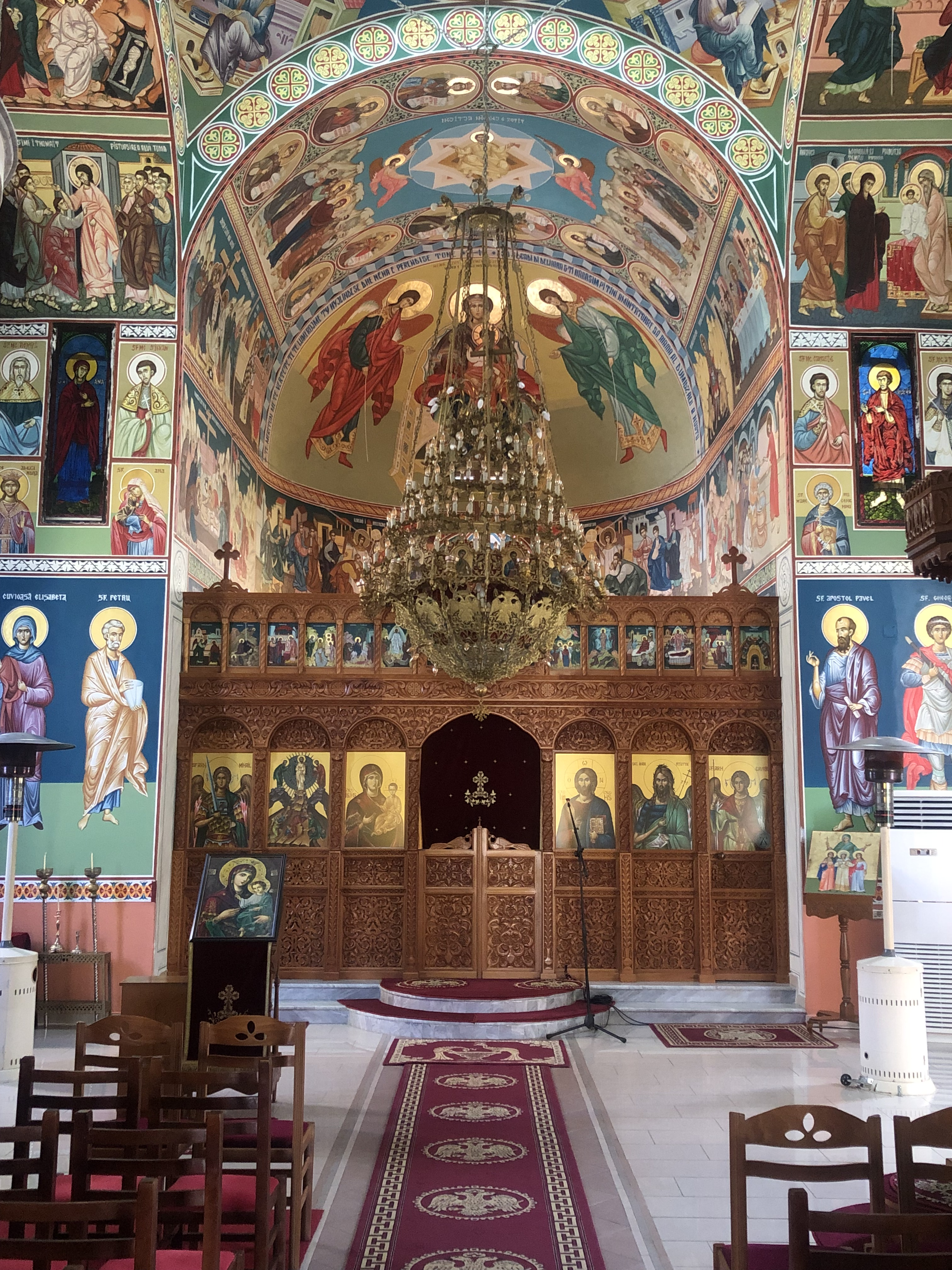
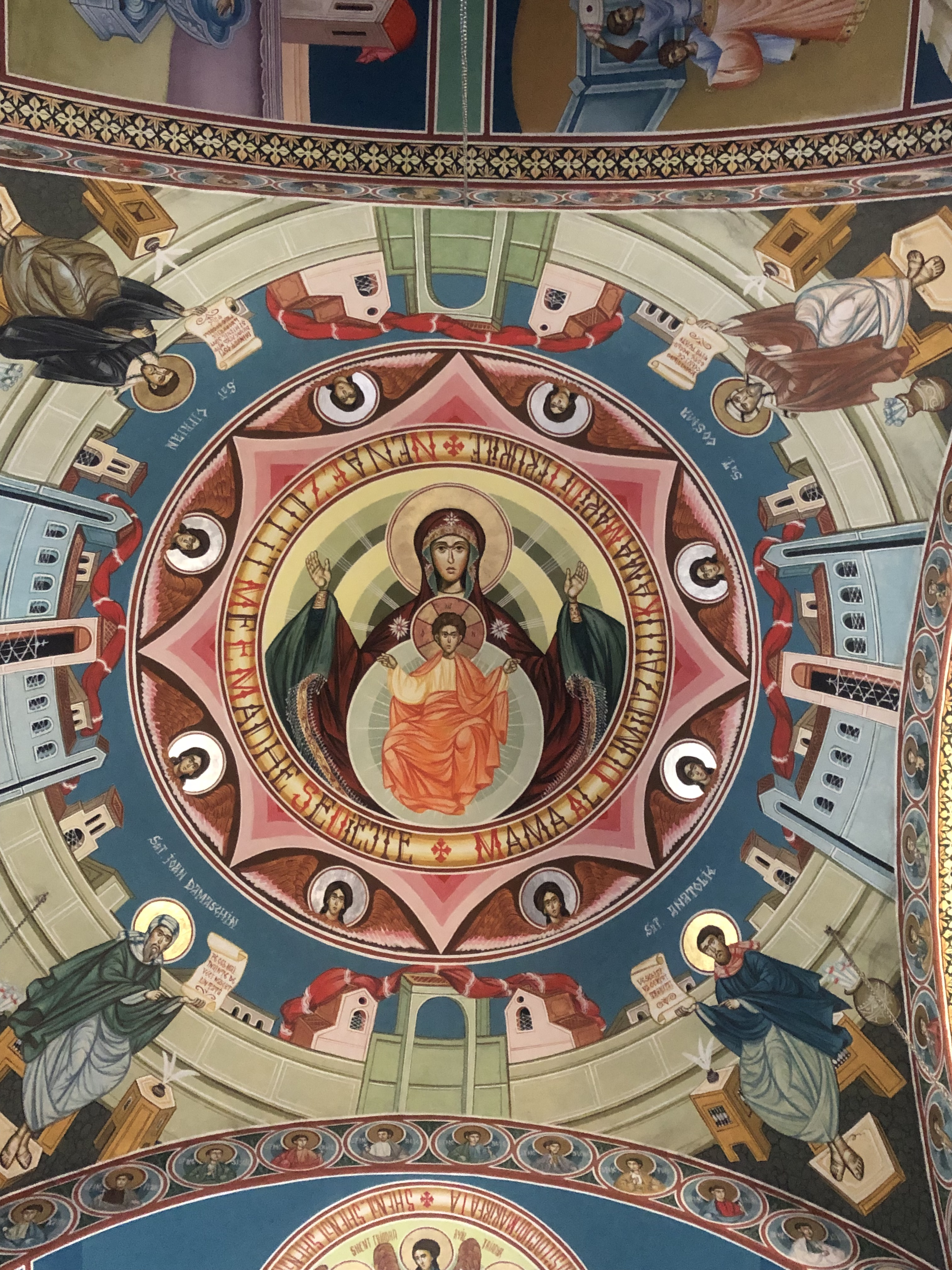
Views of the interior of the new church

On 5 April 1992, Aromanians of Albania (Arumunët e Shqipërisë), an Aromanian cultural organization in Albania, held its first conference. The organization had been officially registered on 24 October 1991, as communism was beginning to fall in Albania. During the conference, it was decided that a priest had to be trained to hold services in Aromanian for the Albanian Aromanian minority. The person chosen for this purpose was Dhimitraq Veriga, a founding member of the association. Veriga stayed in Romania from 1992 to 1993, where he studied at the Neagoe Vodă Basarab Orthodox Theological Seminary in Curtea de Argeș, as Balamaci did during his lifetime. He was ordained priest on 6 December 1992 by the Romanian Archbishop of Argeș and Muscel Calinic Argatu, who had been present at the 1992 conference. Veriga returned to Albania in April 1993 with the objective of reopening the St. Sotir Church, and on 24 September, he consecrated the chapel of the future new church in a hall of the former school "Ballamaçi", which was once a school for the Aromanians of Korçë. The groundbreaking of the new St. Sotir Church took place on 8 October 1995, with the church being completed in 2005. Its construction took place with support from the Romanian state, and it was consecrated on 2 June 2024.

The new church is located on the outskirts of Korçë, in the Rinia Park, at its entrance. It includes the place of the former Aromanian cemetery of the city. It is a triconch (with three apses) church with a cross-shaped roof and a dome. The esonarthex (the inner of two narthexes in a church) and the porch are located in the western side. The church features an iconostasis carved in wood and mural paintings. A bust of Balamaci is located near the church, in the Rinia Park. Installed by the Nicolae Iorga Foundation of Sarandë, it was unveiled on 10 May 2021, on the Balkan Romanianness Day, a public holiday in Romania. The foundation has also expressed its intention of restoring the building of the original chapel, adding to it a museum of Aromanian culture and a space for children to learn Aromanian.

Dhimitraq (also Dhimitër, Dumitru, Dumitrache, Tache or Tachi) Veriga was born on 14 June 1943 in Korçë to Aromanian parents. Before becoming a priest, he was a sculptor, having erected several works in Korçë, including a sculpture of Balamaci. In addition to the services performed at the St. Sotir Church, Veriga also took part in numerous religious ceremonies in many other churches in the area of Korçë. He gave these services in both Aromanian and Albanian, contributing to the preservation of Aromanian in the country. Romanian is also used for the services at the St. Sotir Church. Veriga went frequently to Romania to deal with any issues related to the church and maintained good relations with the Department for Romanians Everywhere and the Romanian Orthodox Church. On 1 December 2011, he was awarded the Order of Cultural Merit in the rank of "Commander" by the President of Romania Traian Băsescu for being one of the most prominent defenders and promoters of "Romanian [sic] identity and culture" in Albania. Veriga died on 5 September 2016. For his activities during his lifetime, Albanian Aromanian activist Valentino Mustaka referred to Veriga as "the most worthy resemblant of our martyr Papa Lambru Balamaci". As of 2019, the St. Sotir Church had Andrea Zhurka, an ethnic Albanian, as its priest.

The new church has hosted several activities and events. Bogdan Stanoevici, then Minister Delegate for Relations with Romanians Everywhere, attended religious service at the church on 21 September 2014 during a visit to Korçë in which he also met with several leaders of local Aromanian associations and representatives of the local authorities. On 7 November 2021, an event was organized at the church for the release of Abecedar aromân ("Aromanian Alphabet"), a manual for learning Aromanian by Thoma Binjaku. The manual's release was supported by the Department for Romanians Everywhere, and the Romanian ambassador to Albania attended the event. On 8 May 2022, Zhurka and priest Dorel Tomoiagă of Baia Mare in Romania held religious service at the church in Albanian and Romanian on the occasion of the Eastern Orthodox holiday of the Sunday of the Myrrhbearers as well as the Europe Day celebrated the next day. The church's choir sang and prayed in Albanian, Aromanian and Romanian. The church, together with other churches in Romania and of the Romanian diaspora, has held annual memorial services on 23 March to commemorate Balamaci and the other Aromanians murdered that day in Korçë in 1914, as well as any other Romanian, Aromanian and Megleno-Romanian "martyrs" that acted in defense of their identity.

The church has been subject to numerous robberies and attacks. It was damaged considerably on 17 December 2017, shortly before Christmas, and also suffered an attempted robbery. On 10 April 2018, the church's exterior was damaged and some 20,000 Albanian lekë were stolen. On 20 July 2022, the church's safe was forced by people who possibly entered during a wedding that day and hid inside the church's premises until the priest left. Later that same year on 15 November, the donation box of the church was robbed. The culprits of these crimes were not identified despite the police's efforts. The Metropolis of Korçë of the Albanian Orthodox Church called for the police to find the perpetrators and bring them to justice.
