= Dritan Dajti =

Albanian mobster

Dritan Dajti (born 17 November 1971) is a notorious mobster from Albania who was the Boss Of The Kavaje Street boys gang In Tirana from 2003-2009. He is mostly known for the brutal murder of four police officers August 7, 2009 during an operation to arrest him in Durrës. The incident marked one of the deadliest confrontations between law enforcement and organized crime in the country’s history.

Dajti’s 2009 police shootout was linked to his earlier crime, the murder of businessman Agim Beqari on February 17, 1999. Agim Beqari was the president of "Besa Konstruksion" and was killed near "Zogu i Zi" in Tirana after dajti tried to extort him. Dajti killed him while wearing a mask. During his trial, Dajti escaped from the Court of Tirana with a smuggled gun during a break in trial. The gun was hidden in a toilet. Dajti pointed the gun at the police in court and fled on a motorcycle driven by another gang member. He lived on the run for more than 6 years. After 6 years, the police managed to find his location and attempted to arrest him. An exchange of fire took place at "Pista Iliria", a very crowded area in Durrës. where four police officers were killed by Dajti. He was arrested and brought to the hospital with serious injuries after the shooting. During his trial he was seen smirking, threatening the court and showing a Polaroid of the crime scene while laughing. Dajti was convicted of four counts of murder and sentenced to four life sentences. The High Court of Albania ruled that his right to a defence lawyer had been violated, Dajti's sentence was reduced to 25 years. In 2024 his life sentence was reinstated and he is currently housed at the Peqin prison in the Elbasan area along with other Albanian Mafia bosses Dajti received medical treatment in 2021.

== Criminal activities ==
Dritan Dajti was born in Albania and became involved in organized crime including drug trafficking, extortion, contract killings, and other criminal activities. Prior to his criminal career he was in law school and was described as a model citizen.

One of the earliest high-profile crimes linked to Dajti was the failed extortion and murder of businessman Agim Beqari on February 17, 1999. Beqari was the president of the construction company “Besa Konstruktion. This incident marked the beginning of Dajti’s infamy as a dangerous figure in Albania. During his trial for Beqari’s murder, Dajti escaped from custody and remained a fugitive for over six years, aided by corrupt elements within the police.

On August 7, 2009, Dajti was involved in a deadly shootout with Albanian police in Durrës. When officers attempted to arrest him, Dajti opened fire, killing four members of the special operations unit: Fatos Xhani, Kastriot Feskaj, Saimir Duçkollari, and Altin Dizdari. Despite being wounded, Dajti was captured and taken into custody.

Dritan Dajti was convicted of four counts of murder and initially sentenced to life imprisonment. However, in a controversial decision in 2019, the Court of Appeal reduced his sentence to 25 years, citing procedural violations regarding his legal defense. This sparked widespread outrage, as Albania’s Penal Code prohibits sentence reductions for crimes punishable by life imprisonment. The decision drew criticism from government officials, the public, and international observers.

In 2020, the Special Anti-Corruption Prosecution (SPAK) cleared three judges involved in reducing Dajti’s sentence of corruption charges, despite investigations revealing illegal weapons and significant cash in the home of one of the judges. However, Judge Miliana Muça demanded further investigations into the case, casting doubt on the integrity of the ruling. In 2021, SPAK demanded that Dritan Dajti's assets be confiscated.

On the 15th anniversary of the 2009 police shootout, in August 2024, a memorial was unveiled at a commemorative ceremony by the Police Directorate in Durrës to honor the four officers killed during the operation. The memorial was created by sculptor Ardian Pepa. The Durrës City Council named the street where the officers were killed “Dëshmorët e Policisë” (Martyrs of the Police), further solidifying their legacy as national heroes. However, just a month after, the memorial was unexpectedly removed, reportedly to clear space for the platform on which it was placed. This decision sparked additional controversy, further fueling public debates around Dajti’s case and the justice system’s handling of the murders.

Dajti remains incarcerated at the Peqin prison and has recently filed for release, claiming to have served his 25-year sentence. His defense argues that the Prosecutor’s Office has yet to issue an execution order for the life sentence reinstated by the Supreme Court, making his continued imprisonment unlawful. The Elbasan court is currently reviewing his request.

== See also ==
- List of massacres in Albania
