= Resulaj shooting =

2018 mass shooting in Albania

- Location: Resulaj, Selenicë, Vlorë County, Albania
- Date: 10 August 2018
- Target: Relatives
- Attack type: Mass shooting
- Weapon: Kalashnikov rifle
- Deaths: 8
- Perpetrator: Ritvan Zykaj

Resulaj shooting is a mass shooting that occurred on 10 August 2018, at Resulaj, Selenicë, Vlorë County, Albania. Ritvan Zykaj shot 8 of his relatives using a Kalashnikov. After the shooting, he hid on a hill near the village and was caught by police the next day.

== Shooting ==
At around 1:30 p.m. on 10 August 2018, the Zykaj family gathered for lunch with Kujtim Zykaj. During lunch, it was discussed that Ritvan Zykaj stole chickens from Vasilika Zykaj. Offended and annoyed, he got up from dinner and left. Thirty minutes later, he returned with a Kalashnikov rifle and shot eight people. He filmed the bodies of the victims and sent the video to a relative via Facebook Messenger. After the shooting, he fled and hid on a hill. While in hiding, he wrote comments on Facebook. He was detained the next day.

== Victims ==
Eight people died in the attack:

- Demir Zykaj (75) brother of the attacker's grandfather.
- Perrie Zykaj (78) Demir Zykaj wife.
- Besim Zykaj (42) son of Demir and Perrie Zykaj.
- Vasilika Zykaj (40) wife of Besim Zykaj.
- Sara Zykaj (15) daughter of Besim Zykaj.
- Ledjon Zykaj (8) son of Besim Zykaj.
- Azem Zykaj (49) son of Demir and Perrie Zykaj.
- Afërdita Zykaj (47) wife of Azem Zykaj.

== Perpetrator ==
Ritvan Zykaj was born on 16 June 1994 in Selenicë. He lived in the village of Resulaj.

Eight years before the shooting, Ritvan was badly burned in a fire. Two of the victims, Besim and Azem Zykaj, rescued him then. Due to this fire, his behavior became inadequate and strange. He became nervous. He has been repeatedly accused of theft. He was arrested for this, investigated, but released. He also repeatedly fired near the village. Residents complained to the police, Ritvan was arrested but released.

The forensic examination concluded that he was mentally healthy.

According to him, the Kalashnikov assault rifle, which was used in the shooting, was obtained during the 1997 Albanian civil unrest and has been stored ever since.

On 10 July 2019, he was sentenced to life imprisonment.

== See also ==
- List of massacres in Albania
