= Viens (surname) =

Viens is a surname. Notable people with the surname include:

- Claude Viens (born 1949), Canadian handball player
- Évelyne Viens (born 1997), Canadian soccer player
- François Viens (born 1975), Canadian racquetball player
- Frederi Viens, American statistician, mathematician, and academic
- Harry Viens, American politician
- Mario Viens (born 1955), Canadian ice hockey player
- Tim Viens (born 1976), American racing driver
- Anne Viens, fictional character in television series La Job
