= Valerie Fraser =

American politician

Member of the New Hampshire House of Representatives from the 1st Belknap district
- In office December 3, 2014 – December 5, 2018
- Preceded by: Ruth Gulick
- Succeeded by: Harry Viens

Personal details
- Party: Republican

Valerie Fraser is an American politician from New Hampshire. She served in the New Hampshire House of Representatives.

Fraser was a member of the Board of Selectmen in New Hampton.
