= Vain =

Vain may refer to:

- Vain (band), an American glam metal band formed in 1986
- Vain (horse) (1966–1991), an Australian Thoroughbred racehorse
- Vain Stakes, an Australian Thoroughbred horse race
- Vaginal intraepithelial neoplasia, a medical disorder
- Edvard August Vainio (1853–1929), taxonomic author abbreviation Vain., Finnish lichenologist
- Vanity Vain, Swedish drag queen
- Vain, a fictional creature in The Chronicles of Thomas Covenant by Stephen Donaldson

== See also ==
- Vanity
- Vane (disambiguation)
- Vains
- Vein (disambiguation)
