= Vane =

Vane may refer to:

== People ==
- Vane (surname)
- Viscount Vane, an extinct title in the Peerage of Ireland

=== Given name ===
- Vane Bor (1908–1993), Serbian artist
- Vančo "Vane" Stojanov, Macedonian former middle-distance runner
- Vane Featherston (1864–1948), English stage actress
- Ivan Vane Ivanović (1913–1999), Yugoslav-British athlete, shipowner, political activist, and philanthropist
- Vane Pennell (1876–1938), English rackets and real tennis player

== Places ==
- Vanë, a settlement in Albania
- Vane, Avatime, a populated place in Ghana
- Vāne Parish, Latvia
- Vane Glacier, Marie Byrd Land, Antarctica
- Ben Vane, a Scottish mountain situated in the southern Highlands

== Other uses ==
- A component of vertical blinds
- Vane (album), the only album by Bleak, released in 1995
- Parts besides the shaft in a pennaceous feather
- A plastic fin on an arrow
- D-alanine—D-serine ligase, an enzyme (VanE)
- Vane, singular form of Vanir, a group of gods in Norse mythology
- Vane (video game), a video game released in 2019
- Weather vane, a device that shows wind direction

== See also ==
- Vanne (river), France
- Vain (disambiguation)
