= Çetë, Berat =

Çetë
- Village
- Location within Albania
- Coordinates: 40°42′N 19°49′E
- Country: Albania
- County: Berat
- Municipality: Dimal
- Administrative unit: Cukalat
- Time zone: UTC+1 (CET)
  - Summer (DST): UTC+2 (CEST)

Çetë is a village in the former municipality of Cukalat in Berat County, Albania. At the 2015 local government reform it became part of the municipality Dimal.
