= Cukalat =

- Administrative unit
- Location within Albania
- Coordinates: 40.731770°N 19.792492°E
- Country: Albania
- County: Berat
- Municipality: Dimal

Population (2011)
  - Administrative unit: 3,045
- Time zone: UTC+1 (CET)
  - Summer (DST): UTC+2 (CEST)

Cukalat is a village and a former municipality in Berat County, central Albania. At the 2015 local government reform it became a subdivision of the municipality of Dimal. The population at the 2011 census was 3,045.

== Localities ==
- Donofrosë
- Slanicë
- Cukalat
- Allambres
- Krotinë
- Çetë
