= Center for Environmental Technology =

The Center for Environmental Technology (CET), formerly known as the Environmental Technology Laboratory of NOAA, US Department of Commerce, is a joint center between the National Oceanic and Atmospheric Administration (NOAA) and the University of Colorado, which designs some of the most sensitive radio receivers in the world for active and passive microwave observation of terrestrial and atmospheric phenomena.
