= Florine =

Florine is both a surname and a feminine French given name. Notable people with the name include:

Surname:

- Hans Florine (born 1964), American rock climber
- Nicolas Florine (1891–1972), engineer that built the first tandem rotor helicopter

Given name:

- Florine De Leymarie (born 1981), French Alpine skier
- Florine of Burgundy (1083–1097), French crusader
- Florine Stettheimer (1871–1944), American artist
- Florine Langweil (1861–1958, French art collector and businesswoman

== See also ==
- Sainte-Florine, a commune in the Haute-Loire department in south-central France
- Fluorine, a chemical element
