= Vanë =

Vanë Vana
- Village
- Location within Albania
- Coordinates: 39°55′57″N 20°1′22″E
- Country: Albania
- County: Vlorë
- Municipality: Delvinë
- Administrative unit: Delvinë
- Time zone: UTC+1 (CET)
  - Summer (DST): UTC+2 (CEST)

Vanë (also known as Cifliku Vana, Van, Vana, or Vanje) is a settlement in the Vlorë County of Albania. It is part of the municipality Delvinë. The village is inhabited by Aromanians.
