= Harry Viens =

American politician

Member of the New Hampshire House of Representatives from the Belknap 1 district
- In office December 5, 2018 – December 2, 2020
- Preceded by: Valerie Fraser
- Succeeded by: Thomas Ploszaj

Personal details
- Party: Republican
- Education: University of Connecticut School of Business; Georgetown University

Harry Viens is a New Hampshire politician.

Viens graduated from University of Connecticut School of Business with a M.B.A. and from Georgetown University with B.A. in English.

On November 6, 2018, Viens was elected to the New Hampshire House of Representatives where he represents the Belknap 1 district. Viens assumed office on December 5, 2018. Viens is a Republican.

Viens resides in Center Harbor, New Hampshire.
