= Vein (disambiguation) =

A vein is a blood vessel that carries blood toward the heart.

Vein may also refer to:

== Science ==
- Vein (botany), vascular tissue in the leaves
- Wing vein, a supporting structure in insect wings
- Vein (geology), a tabular body of minerals distinct from the surrounding rock
- Vein (metallurgy), a casting defect

== Art and entertainment ==
- Vein (band), an American metalcore band
- Vein (Boris album), 2006
- Vein (Foetus album), 2007
- The Vein, a 1928 French silent comedy film
- Vein, a demon in The Demonata
- "Vein", a song by Cannibal Ox from The Cold Vein, 2001
- "Veins", a song by Tori Amos from In Times of Dragons, 2026
- Veins, a stage name used by Canadian musician Luna Li

== People with the surname ==
- Ellen Goldsmith-Vein, American businesswoman and producer
- Jon F. Vein, American lawyer and businessman

== See also ==
- Vain (disambiguation)
