= Vien (name) =

Vien is a surname of French origin, as well as another spelling of the Vietnamese given name Viên (which often finds use alone following a title and thus appearing to English speakers to be a surname).

Those bearing the surname include:

- Joseph-Marie Vien (1716–1809), French painter
- Thomas Vien (1881–1972), Canadian politician
- Jacques Vien (1932–2017), Canadian politician
- Dominique Vien (born 1967), Canadian politician

Those bearing the given name include:

- Cao Văn Viên (1921–2008), South Vietnamese General
- Linh Quang Viên (1918–2013), South Vietnamese Lieutenant General
- Nguyễn Thị Ánh Viên (born 1996), Vietnamese swimmer
