= Fēlikss Ķiģelis =

Latvian musician (born 1976)

Felikss Kigelis
- Born: 25 February 1976 (age 50); Liepāja, Latvian SSR, Soviet Union
- Genres: Rock, hard rock
- Occupations: Songwriter, musician, guitarist, singer
- Instruments: Guitar, piano, vocal, violin
- Years active: 1993–present
- Website: felikssmusic.com

Fēlikss Ķiģelis (born 25 February 1976) is a Latvian rock musician. He was the founder and frontman of Liepāja's bands Tumsa and Melnā Princese before switching to a solo career. He is the son of notable rock musician Ēriks Ķiģelis, who died in car accident in 1985.

== Life ==
Ķiģelis was born on 25 February 1976 in Liepāja. He was the founder and frontman of Liepāja's bands Tumsa and Melnā Princese. In 1999, he pursued a solo career. His father Ēriks Ķiģelis was a member of rock bands Līvi and Coprus.

== Work ==
In the beginning of the 1990s, Ķiģelis was one of the founders and the lead singer of the band Katapults (Catapult), later known as Tumsa. In 1994 Fēlikss left the band and Mārtiņš Freimanis became its new lead singer. In 1996 Fēlikss founded a band called Melnā Princese with which he won the festival Liepājas Dzintars (Amber of Liepāja) in 1997. Melnā Princese released 2 albums but in 1998 disbanded.

In 1999, Ķiģelis pursued a solo career. In the same year he released the album Rudens vēju muzikants(The Musician of the Autumn Winds) in memory of his late father where the most popular songs by Ēriks Ķiģelis were put together. In 2001 the album Atmiņas (Memories) was released where besides the songs by Fēlikss there were also two by his father Ēriks.

In 2002 the first true solo album Rīts lēni nāk (The Morning Comes Slowly) by Fēlikss Ķiģelis was released. The album got nominated for the Year Award of Latvia's Records as the best rock album. The song Lietus sašuj (The Rain Sews Up) from this album was nominated as the best rock song. Another song Vējā (In the Wind) from this same album became very popular, too.

In the beginning of 2004 F.Ķiģelis returned with the song Bezmiegs (Insomnia), which reached high positions in the charts of Latvia's radio stadions also holding the No.1 for 4 weeks in Latvia's Music Chart. Ķiģelis' second solo album Samts (Velvet) was released in Oncober 2004. The song Tev ir viss, ko es vēlos (You Have Got Everything I Wish For) also reached No1 in Latvia's Music Chart. The album got nominated for the best rock album of 2004.

In 2005 Fēlikss released the second album to commemorate his father – '’Rudens vēju muzikants Vol.2'’ (The Musician of the Autumn Winds Vol.2) where the songs by his father were performed by various Latvian musicians.

In 2010 the first best of Fēlikss Ķiģelis was released combining all his most popular songs. On 1 September 2012 Fēlikss released his 4th studio solo album Starp dimantiem un pelniem (In Between Diamonds and Ashes). The song Ceļš uz mājām (The Way Home) became one of the most popular Radio SWH songs of 2012 but Sapņu pils (The Castle of Dreams) became the finalist of Latvia's biggest pop and rock song survey.

On 28 November 2014 with live translation from Rock Cafe Riga, Fēlikss released his 5th studio solo album Uzzīmētā birds (Painted heart).

Fēlikss Ķiģelis is also known as a composer and writes for other performers including Igo, Ivo Fomins, etc.

== Awards ==
Ķiģelis was nominated for award at the 2003 Annual Latvian Music Awards: for Lietus sasuj in category "radio Hits", two awards at 2004 Annual Latvian Music Awards: for Bezmiegs in category "radio Hits" and Samts in category 'Best Rock albums". two awards at 2015 Annual Latvian Music Awards: for Ziema in category "radio Hits" and Uzzīmētā sirds in category 'Best Rock albums".

== Discography ==
With Melnā Princese rock band

- Viens (1997)
- Kā būt (1998)

Solo albums

- Rudens vēju muzikants (2000)
- Atmiņas (2001)
- Rīts lēni nāk (2002)
- Samts (2004)
- Rudens vēju muzikants Vol. 2 (2005)
- Labāko dziesmu izlase (2010)
- Starp dimantiem un pelniem (2012)
- Uzzīmētā sirds (2014)
- Sirdsapziņa (2021)

Live albums

- Live at Palladium (2013)
