= Borovë, Korçë =

Borovë
- Village
- Location within Albania
- Coordinates: 40°18′39″N 20°39′9″E
- Country: Albania
- County: Korçë
- Municipality: Kolonjë
- Administrative unit: Qendër Ersekë
- Time zone: UTC+1 (CET)
  - Summer (DST): UTC+2 (CEST)

Borovë or Borova is a village in the Korçë County, Albania. At the 2015 local government reform it became part of the municipality Kolonjë.

During World War II forces of National Liberation Movement, led by Riza Kodheli fought against a German convoy, which was going to Greece. The Germans responded with the Massacre of Borovë, which occurred in the settlement on civilian population as a reprisal.

== Demographics ==
The village had a population of 333 in 1989.
