= Kutalli =

Kutalli Kutal (Aromanian)
- Administrative unit
- Location within Albania
- Coordinates: 40°47′2″N 19°47′12″E
- Country: Albania
- County: Berat
- Municipality: Dimal

Population (2011)
  - Administrative unit: 9,643
- Time zone: UTC+1 (CET)
  - Summer (DST): UTC+2 (CEST)

Kutalli (Albanian definite form: Kutallija; Aromanian: Kutal), is a village and a former municipality in Berat County, central Albania. At the 2015 local government reform it became a subdivision of the municipality Dimal. The population at the 2011 census was 9,643. The village is populated by Albanians & Aromanians.

== Geography ==
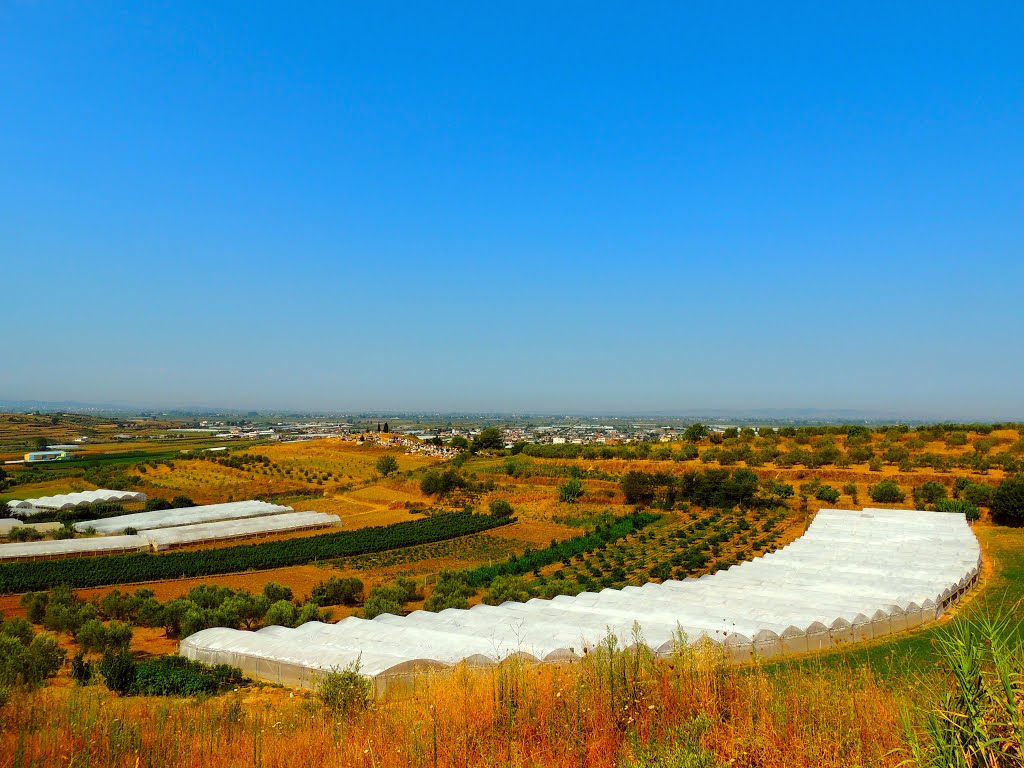
Horticulture near Goriçan Çlirim

Closest places to Kutalli: Samaticë (2 miles), Pobrat (1 mile), Drenovicë (1 mile), Rërës (1 mile), Protoduar (2 miles), Sqepur (2 miles), Goricani Çlirimi (2 miles), Malas-Gropë (2 miles).
