= Dimal (municipality) =

- Municipality
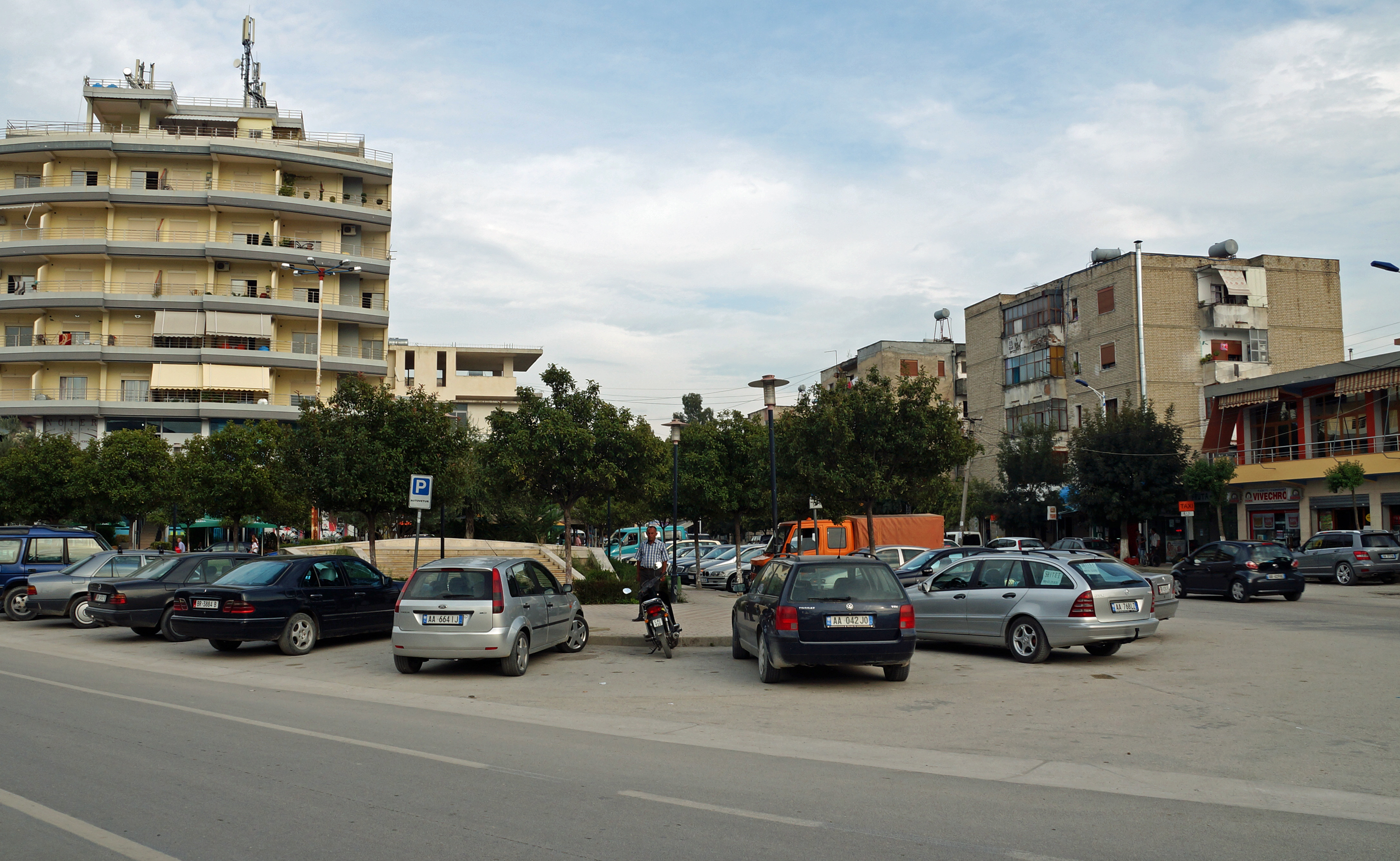
- City Center of Dimal

- Emblem

- Location within Albania
- Coordinates: 40°46′N 19°53′E
- Country: Albania
- County: Berat

Government
  - Mayor: Juliana Memaj (PS)

Area
  - Municipality: 156.65 km^{2} (60.48 sq mi)
- Elevation: 40 m (130 ft)

Population (2023)
  - Municipality: 28,135
  - Municipality density: 179.60/km^{2} (465.17/sq mi)
- Time zone: UTC+1 (CET)
  - Summer (DST): UTC+2 (CEST)
- Area Code: (0)361
- Website: bashkiadimal.gov.al

Dimal (Albanian: Dimali, before April 2021: Ura Vajgurore) is a municipality in Berat County, central Albania. It was formed at the 2015 local government reform by the merger of the former municipalities Cukalat, Kutalli, Poshnjë and Dimal, that became municipal units. The seat of the municipality is the town Ura Vajgurore. The total population is 27,295 (2011 census), in a total area of 156.65 km^{2}.

The municipality is named after the ancient Illyrian city of Dimale, a toponym which means "two mountains" in Albanian.
