= Librazhd District =

Defunct (2000) Albanian administrative area

Librazhd District Rrethi i Librazhd
- Former district
- Coordinates: 41°11′N 20°24′E
- Country: Albania
- Dissolved: 2000
- Seat: Librazhd

Area
  - Total: 1,102 km^{2} (425 sq mi)

Population (2001)
  - Total: 72,520
  - Density: 65.81/km^{2} (170.4/sq mi)
- Time zone: UTC+1 (CET)
  - Summer (DST): UTC+2 (CEST)

Librazhd District (Albanian: Rrethi i Librazhdit) was one of the 36 districts of Albania, which were dissolved in July 2000 and replaced by 12 newly created counties. It had a population of 72,520 in 2001, and an area of 1,102 km^{2} (425 sq mi). It was formed as an administrative unit in 1958. It is in the east of the country, and its capital and administrative center was the town of Librazhd. The area of the former district includes most of the regions of the ethnographic region. Its territory is now part of Elbasan County: the municipalities of Librazhd and Prrenjas.

== Geography ==
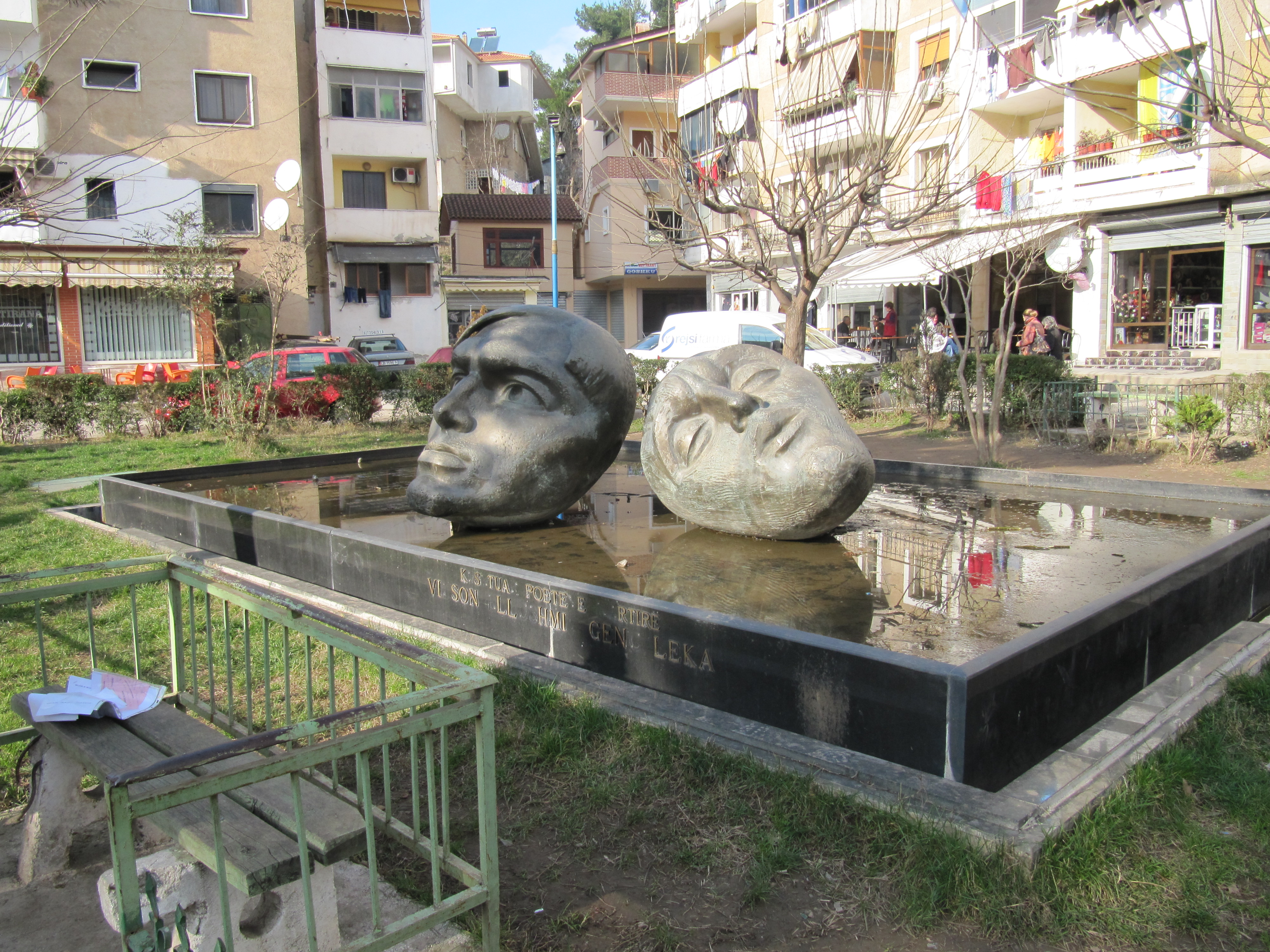
A memorial sculpture in Librazhd.

Librazhd District has an administrative border of 42 km (26 mi). The district is characterised by a mountainous landscape with scenic valleys, including glacial valleys above 1,500 feet (460 m) in the Polis Mountains. The Shkumbin River is sourced in and traverses through the district. The average altitude is 713 feet (217 m) above sea level. The highest point is at the Red Peak of Shebenik Mountain.

Librazhd District has a continental climate. The average temperature is 13.4 °C (56.1 °F). The maximum temperature 40.7 °C (105.3 °F) was recorded in 1957, while the minimum recorded temperature was in 1968 at −15.7 °C (3.7 °F). Precipitation averages 1363 mm per year.

The Shkumbin River has its source in the Librazhd District at Valamra and the Guri i Topit Mountain. The river is 181 km (112 mi) long and flows through the district for 64 km (40 mi). The Shkumbin is fed by the waters of the Dushna, Radicina, Bushtrica, Sheja, Hotolisht, Dragostunja streams. The Shkumbin flows through the town of Librazhd. The Rrapun River joins the Shkumbin at Murrash.

The Shebenik-Jabllanice National Park is the Librazhd District's only national park and makes up approximately 33% of the district's area.

== Flora and fauna ==
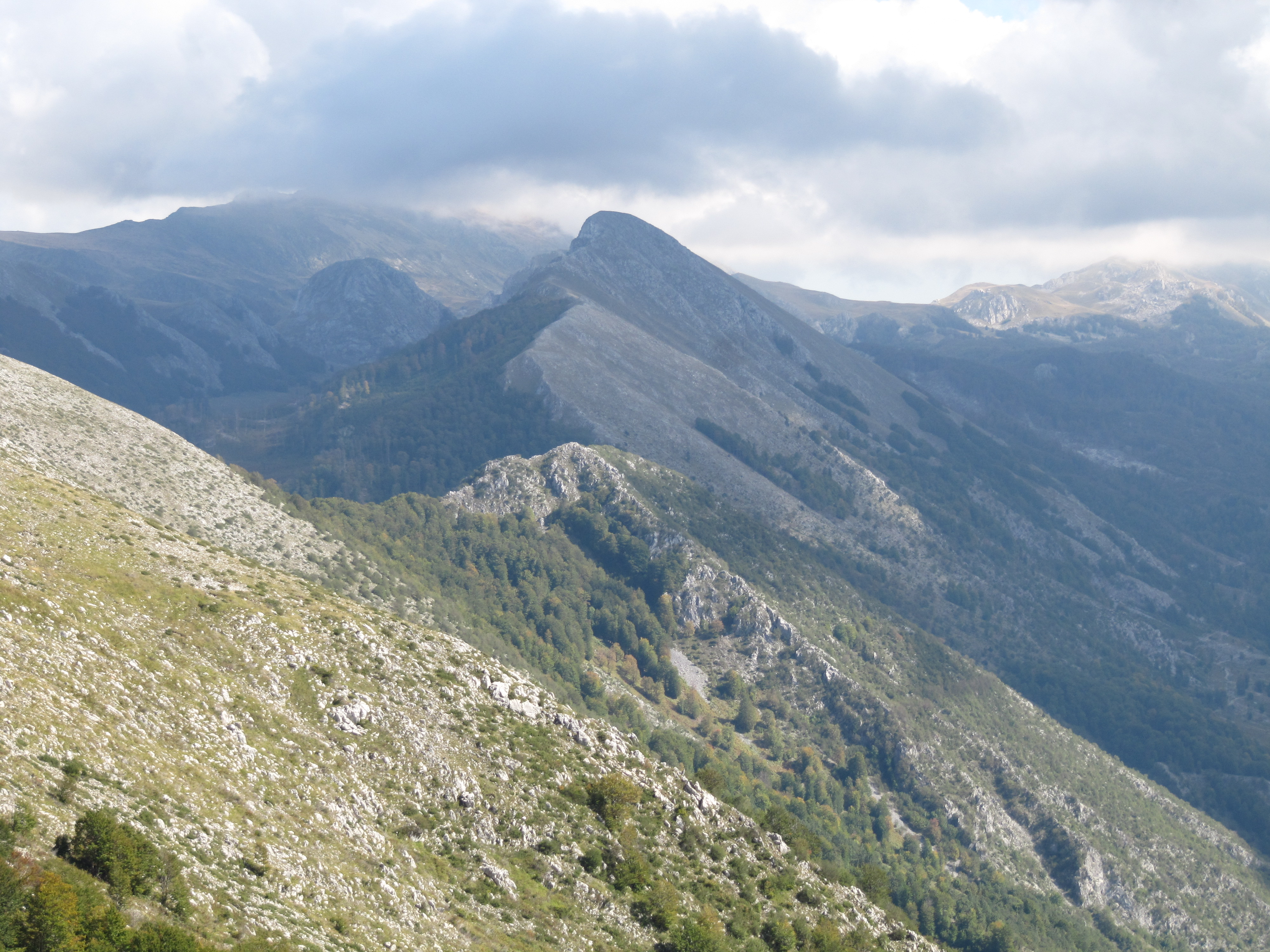
Much of the district is mountainous.

There are 1,857 species of flora in the district representing 57% of the total species of flora inhabiting Albania. Forests cover 47% of the district of which 37% are populated by oak, 20% beech and 15% pine. The remainder is made up of shrubs and other foliage. 15% of the herbaceous flora in the district fall within the group known as Balkan Flora and are particular to this part of Europe. Amongst the herbaceous plants the most notable species endemic to the district are Leontopodium alpinum and Sideritis Rhoeseri. Of particular interest is a carnivorous plant species called Pinguicula hirtflora (known locally as Luletlyni).

The forests and mountains of the district are populated with bear (Ursus arctos), wild boar, red fox, hare, and supposedly the Balkan Lynx. Birds include eagles (Aquila chrysaetos and Gyps fulvus), buzzards (Nephron pesnopterus), falcons (Falcao tinnunculus) and the owl (Bubo bubo).

== History and culture ==
Evidence has been found to show the area was populated during the Bronze Age and the Iron Age from the remains of settlements found at Spathar, Rrajce, Karkavec, Berzeshte and other places. An Illyrian tribe called the Kandavët who give the region the name Kandavia populated the area in ancient times.

The Romans moved into the area in around 220BCE and subjugated the tribes living there (see Illyrian Wars). During the Roman Occupation the Via Egnatia was constructed through the area, linking Rome with Constantinople which was of great importance for commerce. The route of this ancient road is now utilised by a modern highway connecting Tirana with Skopje via Lake Ohrid. Following the Fall of Rome in 476CE the region fell under the power of the Eastern Roman Empire centred at Constantinople until the arrival of the Turks in the 15th century.

The Ottoman Turks began to invade the area of the modern district from about 1415 onwards under the leadership of Mehmed I. They were opposed by the local Arianitas family who ruled the area as vassals to the Byzantine Emperor in Constantinople. The local prince Gjergj Arianit Komneni (also known as Gjergj Golemi) was noted by the Ottoman chroniclers for his ferocious resistance to their advances, viz:

With this uprising Arianiti accomplished great and unforgettable deeds which will last as long as life itself. (from Hallkokondili)

Gjergj Arianiti managed to resist the Ottoman advance throughout his tenure and in 1444 rose to support the revolt led by George Kastrioti, otherwise known as Skanderbeg – the Albanian national hero. He is known to have taken part in the Albanian League in Lezhë which elected Skanderbeg their king. Arianiti fought alongside Skanderbeg at Berat in 1448 and his daughter, Andronika, married Skanderbeg in 1451.

Gjergj Arianiti died in 1461 and resistance to the Turks throughout the Librazhd district began to wane. Following his death the remaining members of the Arianiti family emigrated to Italy. In 1479 the Ottoman Turks succeeded in conquering the Albanians who were forced to accept the Turks as their overlords until the 20th century. The region came to achieve a significant degree of autonomy during the latter years of the Ottoman Empire due to the harshness of the terrain and the talent for diplomacy and nepotism exercised by the local Beyliks who garnered significant influence with the Porte.

During the 17th century, parts of the Librazhd district achieved a measure of self-rule. This process continued up until the uprising of Tanzimati in 1834 when the whole Librazhd District attempted to throw off Ottoman rule. They were unsuccessful this time, but a local leader by the name Halit Berzeshta emerged who was to lead and inspire the Albanian resistance until his death in 1909. In 1912 the population enthusiastically rose in revolt against the Ottoman Empire and took their part in the realisation of Albanian Independence that same year.

In the 1940s, some 1,100 local men formed into two battalions fought the occupying Germans and helped liberate the area. Their exploits were famous throughout Albania and from their number are recognised 79 national martyrs.

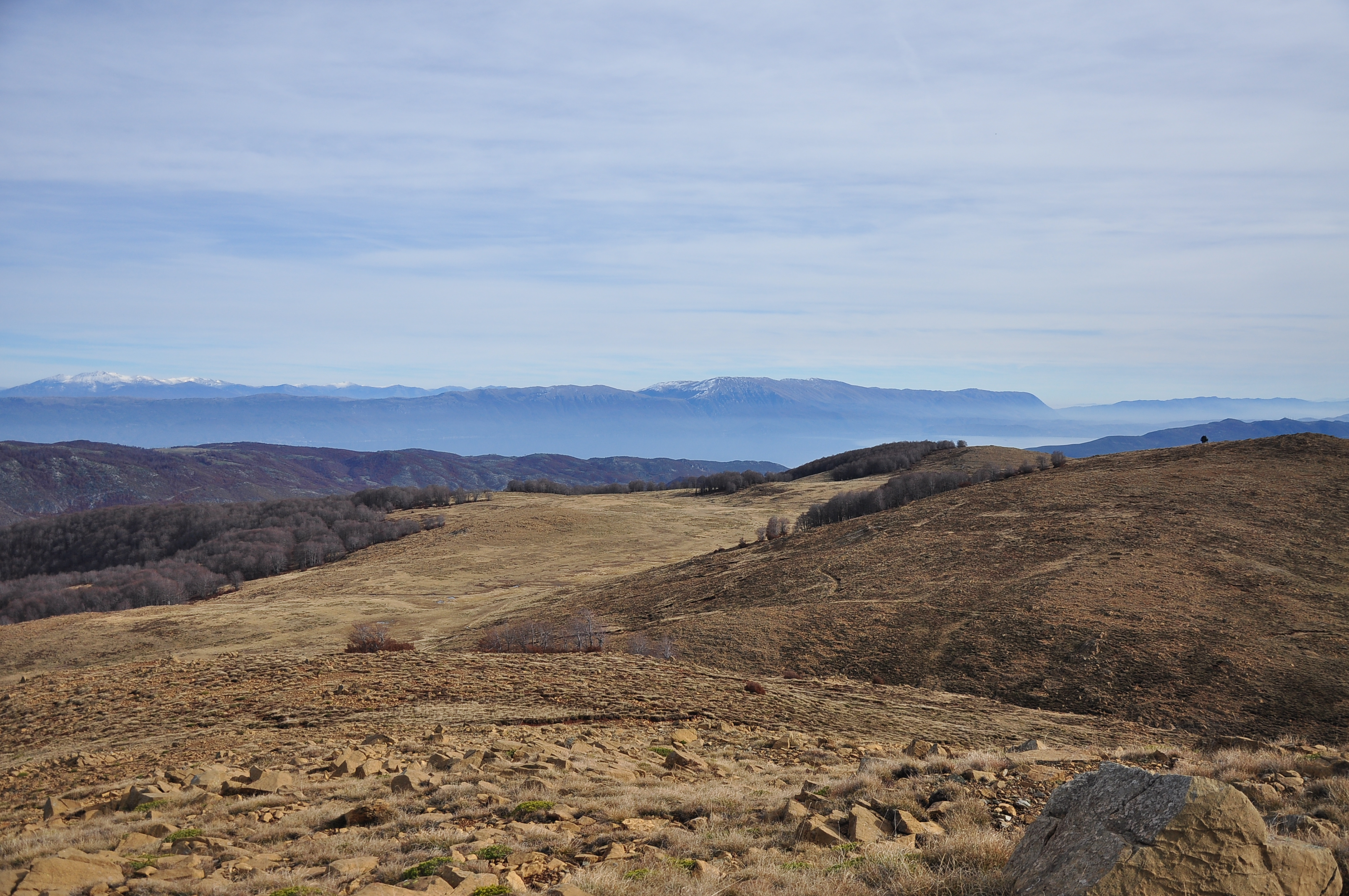
View from Shebenik Mountain, the district's highest mountain

Life in the Librazhd District has been badly affected by the closing of many traditional industries, in particular the mining industry due to an inability to meet modern European environmental and health and safety standards. The construction of a highway linking the town with Skopje and Tirana through Durrës has been a positive development.

== Cultural traditions ==
Librazhd costume is characterized by garments made from wool, hemp and flax. The choice of colours is considered in Albania to be particularly noteworthy. Garments are traditionally decorated with an eagle, star, snake, ram, geometric figures, plants and flowers. Located at the crossroads of northern and southern Albania, the wearers folk costumes in the district are a combination of those in both Gheg and Tosk culture. The flattened form of qeleshe skull cap traditional to the south is usually worn by men in the countryside.

Tosk is the dominant Albanian dialect spoken in the district, although in many the villages north of the Shkumbin, Gheg can be heard. Additionally in some of the villages bordering the Bulqizë district and those near Macedonia, there are a number of Golloborda Macedonian families who speak Macedonian.

Most people in the district are Muslims who live amongst smaller communities of Roman Catholics, Evangelicals, and Orthodox Christians.

== Economy ==
Mining has been central to Librazhd District since Roman times, in particular the mining of nickel, chromium, platinum, copper, bauxite and gold. Large mines operated in the area, in particular at Farret, Katjel, Bushtric, Hotolisht, Prrenjas, Dardh and Qarrisht. Most of these mines are now inactive.

The district used to have a nationally famous tobacco industry. Wine is still produced and some timber mills are still active. Mineral water under the brand Sopoti is bottled at Spathar and is distributed throughout Albania. Librazhd is also known for the medicinal qualities of its natural mineral water.

== Administrative divisions ==
The district consisted of the following municipalities:

- Hotolisht
- Librazhd
- Lunik
- Orenjë
- Polis
- Prrenjas
- Qendër
- Qukës
- Rrajcë
- Steblevë
- Stravaj

== Notable people ==
- Gjergj Arianit Komneni
- Halit Berzeshta from Berzeshta
- Hasan Moglica from Moglicë
