= Letëm =

- Village
- Location within Albania
- Coordinates: 41°14′55″N 20°20′18″E
- Country: Albania
- County: Elbasan
- Municipality: Librazhd
- Administrative unit: Lunik
- Time zone: UTC+1 (CET)
  - Summer (DST): UTC+2 (CEST)

Letëm is a village in the Elbasan County, eastern Albania. Following the local governmental reform of 2015, Letëm became a part of the municipality of Librazhd and is under the municipal unit of Lunik.

== Demographic History ==
Letëm (Letimje) is attested in the Ottoman defter of 1467 as a village in the vilayet of Çermeniça. It had a total of 15 households represented by the following household heads: Berisha Porteviri, Petër Gërdi, Pop Bogdani, Pop Petri, Dimitri Gërdi, Tiha Koshmani, Nikolla Mastori, Vaska Susjati, Nikolla Mihalevi, Petër Ejurina, Dragon Augusti, Dimitri Kadhapota, Varsaq Vojko, Gjergo Bojko, Dimitri Kallogjeri, Streze Varsaqi, Gjergji Rajçini, Vasko Martini, Nikolla Erebica, and Andrije Gërdi.
