= Gizavesh =

- Village
- Location within Albania
- Coordinates: 41°13′41″N 20°20′40″E
- Country: Albania
- County: Elbasan
- Municipality: Librazhd
- Administrative unit: Qendër Librazhd
- Time zone: UTC+1 (CET)
  - Summer (DST): UTC+2 (CEST)

Gizavesh is a village in the Elbasan County, eastern Albania. Following the local government reform of 2015, Gizavesh became a part of the municipality of Librazhd and is under the municipal unit of Qendër Librazhd.

== Demographic History ==
Gizavesh (Kinazhavic) is attested in the Ottoman defter of 1467 as a settlement in the vilayet of Çermeniça. The village had a total of seven households represented by the following household heads: Pop Nikolla, Petri Mançi (possibly, Maneci), Çiro Batishi, Mihal Kalevari, Gjon Filoku (possibly, Floku), Nikollë Derazi, and Miho Prifti.
