= Zgosht =

- Village
- Location within Albania
- Coordinates: 41°15′8″N 20°19′12″E
- Country: Albania
- County: Elbasan
- Municipality: Librazhd
- Administrative unit: Lunik
- Time zone: UTC+1 (CET)
  - Summer (DST): UTC+2 (CEST)

Zgosht is a village in the Elbasan County, eastern Albania. Following the local governmental reform of 2015, Zgosht became a part of the municipality of Librazhd and is under the municipal unit of Lunik.

== Demographic History ==
Zgosht (Izgosht) is attested in the Ottoman defter of 1467 as a village in the vilayet of Çermeniça. It had a total of seven households represented by the following household heads: Progon Kalluri, Martin Kalluri, Mihal Ribari, Pop Nikolla, Bratislav son of Dimitri, Andrija Radi, and Petër Pikaj (possibly, Pekaj, Pjekaj).
