= Babje =

- Village
- Location within Albania
- Coordinates: 41°9′25″N 20°17′47″E
- Country: Albania
- County: Elbasan
- Municipality: Librazhd
- Administrative unit: Qendër Librazhd
- Time zone: UTC+1 (CET)
  - Summer (DST): UTC+2 (CEST)

Babje is a village in the Elbasan County, eastern Albania. Following the local government reform of 2015, Babje became a part of the municipality of Librazhd and is under the municipal unit of Qendër Librazhd

== Demographic History ==
Babje (Babjani) is attested in the Ottoman defter of 1467 as a settlement in the vilayet of Çermeniça. The village had a total of 30 households represented by the following household heads: Klates Primigyri, Pop Martini, Gjon Bardi, Gjergj Kallori, Gjon Divori, Gjin Deresi (Qorsi), Ishri Bardi, Gjon Bujari, Nikolla Gjeçi, Gjin Mekshe, Martin Brashini, Todor Barçi, Dimitri Barçi, Minek Somini, Gjergj Kolmaksi, Gjon Kokla, Pelgrin Bajishta, Tolë Bujari, Todor Bajishta, Gjon Bosi, Ishri Bujari, Kostë Muriqi, Mark Mazhi, Pop Leka, Andrije Bujari, Gjergji son of Ilija, Pal Kokla, Tulani son of Gjin Barçi, Gjon Shalësi, and Gjon Vlashiqi.
