= Kostenjë =

- Village
- Location within Albania
- Coordinates: 41°20′22″N 20°17′43″E
- Country: Albania
- County: Elbasan
- Municipality: Librazhd
- Administrative unit: Lunik
- Time zone: UTC+1 (CET)
  - Summer (DST): UTC+2 (CEST)

Kostenjë is a village in the Elbasan County, eastern Albania. Following the local governmental reform of 2015, Kostenjë became a part of the municipality of Librazhd and is under the municipal unit of Lunik.

== Name ==
The name of the village is a Slavic toponym.

== History ==
Kostenjë (Kostenjani) is attested in the Ottoman defter of 1467 as a village in the vilayet of Çermeniça. It had a total of 17 households represented by the following household heads: Gjon Porteviri, Pop Nikolla, Gjon Dajçe, Petër Dajçe, Nikolla Mileva, Gjon Bileci, Nikolla Gjergji, Aleko Dimitri, Gjon Koleci, Andrije Katadhota, Gjergj Shirgji, Gjon Draksha, Pop Petri, Vasili son of Kallogjer, Petri son of Gjoni, and Kristila.

During the Second World War on 8 January 1944, British Special Operations Executive officers attached to the Albanian partisans were ambushed in the village of Kostenjë. The combined German and Balli Kombëtar ambush resulted in the capture of Brigadier Edmund Frank "Trotsky" Davies and death of Brigadier Arthur Nicholls.
