= Koshorisht =

- Village
- Location within Albania
- Coordinates: 41°15′44″N 20°23′17″E
- Country: Albania
- County: Elbasan
- Municipality: Librazhd
- Administrative unit: Lunik
- Time zone: UTC+1 (CET)
  - Summer (DST): UTC+2 (CEST)

Koshorisht is a village in the Elbasan County, eastern Albania. Following the local governmental reform of 2015, Koshorisht became a part of the municipality of Librazhd and is under the municipal unit of Lunik.

== Demographic History ==
Koshorisht (Kosharisht) is attested in the Ottoman defter of 1467 as a village in the vilayet of Çermeniça. It had a total of six households represented by the following household heads: Pop Miho, Ivo Samuhrani, Jovan Belobradi, Qirkojan (possibly, Qirko Jani), Gjergj Çenkari, and Nikolla Berishi.
