= Dragostunjë =

- Village
- Location within Albania
- Coordinates: 41°10′49″N 20°21′43″E
- Country: Albania
- County: Elbasan
- Municipality: Librazhd
- Administrative unit: Qendër Librazhd
- Time zone: UTC+1 (CET)
  - Summer (DST): UTC+2 (CEST)

Dragostunjë is a village in the Elbasan County, eastern Albania. Following the local government reform of 2015, Dragostunjë became a part of the municipality of Librazhd and is under the municipal unit of Qendër Librazhd

== Demographic History ==
Dragostunjë is attested in the Ottoman defter of 1467 as a settlement in the vilayet of Çermeniça. The village had a total of nine households represented by the following household heads: Pop Jovani, Bogdan Primiqyri, Bogdan Berishi, Andrija Berishi, Gjergj Vasili, Kojo Prifti, Miri son of Todor, Todor son of Bogdan, and Dimitri Begoj.
