= Dorëz, Elbasan =

Dorëz
- Village
- Location within Albania
- Coordinates: 41°13′21″N 20°19′34″E
- Country: Albania
- County: Elbasan
- Municipality: Librazhd
- Administrative unit: Qendër Librazhd
- Time zone: UTC+1 (CET)
  - Summer (DST): UTC+2 (CEST)

Dorëz is a village in the Elbasan County, eastern Albania. Following the local government reform of 2015, Dorëz became a part of the municipality of Librazhd and is under the municipal unit of Qendër Librazhd

== Demographic History ==
Dorëz (Dorazi) is attested in the Ottoman defter of 1467 as a settlement in the vilayet of Çermeniça. The village had a total of 10 households represented by the following household heads: Nikolla Primiqyri, Pop Nikolla, Andrije Pishkashi, Llazar Derezi, Nikolla Bosida, Gjergj Draksha, Gjin Derezi, Dimitri Pelisha, Dimitri Lala, and Petko Pelisha.
