= Sopot, Albania =

Sopot
- Village
- Location within Albania
- Coordinates: 41°02′30″N 20°18′15″E
- Country: Albania
- County: Elbasan
- Municipality: Prrenjas
- Administrative unit: Stravaj
- Time zone: UTC+1 (CET)
  - Summer (DST): UTC+2 (CEST)

Sopot (Albanian definite form: Sopoti) is a village in eastern Albania. It was part of the former municipality Stravaj. At the 2015 local government reform it became part of the municipality Prrenjas.

== Geography ==
The area has natural attractions for tourism, such as the Gostima Waterfall, karstic caves, woods, a rich flora and fauna, and local ethnoculture.

Sopot rises up from 800–1,970 metres (2,620–6,460 ft) above sea level, where the highest point is Gaferr's Peak, 1,972 metres (6,470 ft).

== History ==
According to a folkloric legend, during the Ottoman invasion of this mountainous part of Albania, women with their children flew from the castle's wall so as not to surrender to the Ottomans.

Following five hundred years of Ottoman occupation and islamisation, the population of Sopot now carries two names, one Muslim and one Christian.

The area's population has decreased lately due to immigration.

== See also ==
- Sopoti Librazhd, football team
