= Funarës =

- Village
- Location within Albania
- Coordinates: 41°16′55″N 20°18′0″E
- Country: Albania
- County: Elbasan
- Municipality: Librazhd
- Administrative unit: Orenjë
- Time zone: UTC+1 (CET)
  - Summer (DST): UTC+2 (CEST)

Funarës is a village in the Elbasan County, mid Albania. At the 2015 local government reform it became part of the municipality Librazhd.

== Demographic History ==
Funarës (Fanaris) is attested in the Ottoman defter of 1467 as a village in the vilayet of Çermeniça. It had a total of four households represented by the following household heads: Gjin Shigoni, Tose Pali, Kal Dobri, and Llazar Mamiza.
