= Dorëz =

Dorëz may refer to the following places in Albania:

- Dorëz, Elbasan, a village in the municipality of Librazhd, Elbasan County
- Dorëz, Gjirokastër, a village in the municipality of Tepelenë, Gjirokastër County
- Dorëz, Tirana, a village in the municipality of Tirana
