= Lunik, Albania =

Lunik
- Administrative unit
- Location within Albania
- Coordinates: 41°17′N 20°19′E
- Country: Albania
- County: Elbasan
- Municipality: Librazhd

Population (2011)
  - Administrative unit: 2,621
- Time zone: UTC+1 (CET)
  - Summer (DST): UTC+2 (CEST)

Lunik is a village and a former municipality in the Elbasan County, eastern Albania. At the 2015 local government reform it became a subdivision of the municipality Librazhd. The population at the 2011 census was 2,621. The municipal unit consists of the villages Dranovice, Koshorisht, Kostenjë, Letëm, Lunik, Prevall and Zgosht.

== Demographic History ==
Lunik (Lubnik) is attested in the Ottoman defter of 1467 as a village in the vilayet of Çermeniça. It had a total of 30 households represented by the following household heads: Jovanec Porteviri, Bogdo Milloshi, Nikolla Marini, Gjurevici son of Meçi, Petër Karshuli, Dimitri Hutina, Rado brother of Dimitri, Miho son of Rajko, Petër Lonja, Miho Gërdi, Dragoi son of Lipa, Stan Ivgjeçi (possibly, Vgjeçi), Pop Shyti, Miho Koleci, Gjergji Varsaqi, Nikolla Lopësi, Lekë Shoku, Gjergj Teraku, Marko son of Papa Nikolla, Niko Stani, Kojo Bogdishi, Gjergj Pazajiti, Petko Vllahu, Petko Martini, Petko Krakoviqi, Gjure Radeci, Petko Disini, Tutko Gërdi, Petër Duldini, and Mihal Paniçeri.

== Notable residents ==
- Taulant Balla (born 1977), politician
