= Funar (disambiguation) =

Funar is a suco in East Timor.

Funar may also refer to:

- Gheorghe Funar, a nationalist Romanian politician, former mayor of Cluj-Napoca between 1992 and 2004

== See also ==
- Funares, a village in Albania
