= Hotolisht =

- Administrative unit
- Location within Albania
- Coordinates: 41°9′N 20°24′E
- Country: Albania
- County: Elbasan
- Municipality: Librazhd

Population (2011)
  - Administrative unit: 5,706
- Time zone: UTC+1 (CET)
  - Summer (DST): UTC+2 (CEST)

Hotolisht is a village and a former municipality in the Elbasan County, eastern Albania. At the 2015 local government reform it became a subdivision of the municipality Librazhd. The population at the 2011 census was 5,706. The municipal unit consists of the villages Buzgare, Dardhe, Hotolisht, Kokreve, Vehcan, Vulcan and Xhyre.

== Demographic history ==
The village of Hotolisht appears in the Ottoman defter of 1467 as a settlement in the vilayet of Çermeniça with a total of 13 households, represented by the following household heads: Pop Shtjafenim, Pop Kozmai, Gjergj Vlashi, Mekshe Koleci, Progon Goroda (possibly, Guruda or Gruda), Tolë Penkuli, Gjon Primiqyri, Nikolla Bosi, Nenko Andropoli, Progon Pilashi, Petër Vlashi, Ishri Vlashi, and Gjergj Koja.
