= Moglicë, Elbasan =

Moglicë
- Village
- Location within Albania
- Coordinates: 41°23′20″N 20°23′10″E
- Country: Albania
- County: Elbasan
- Municipality: Librazhd
- Administrative unit: Stëblevë
- Time zone: UTC+1 (CET)
  - Summer (DST): UTC+2 (CEST)

Moglicë is a historic village in the Stëblevë commune, Elbasan County, in Albania. At the 2015 local government reform it became part of the municipality Librazhd. Until 1991 Moglicë was under the administration of Dibër, Albania. Since 1991 Stëblevë consists of the villages Borove, Llange, Moglicë, Prodan, Sebisht, Steblevë and Zabzun.

== History ==
Moglicë is the birthplace of Hasan Moglica (1854–1915), a scholar, educator, leader, engineer, philosopher, patriot, nationalist figure and the martyr of Albanian language and nation. He was buried alive by the Serbian army on 15 June 1915 when he refused to sell Albanian land.

Albanian Teacher Hasan Moglica had transformed his 28-room stone-house into a huge library and language school. As of today, memories of glory days of Moglicë of Dibra remain an important part of the Albanian culture.

The Moglica's Publisher (In Albanian: Moglicë) is a Dibër publishing house that was founded by The Moglica's House in 1876 to publish Abetaret in Albanian. It was burnt down by Turkish soldiers of Turgut Pasha in 1908.

== Economy ==
Historically the main economic activity of the village has been the livestock farming, hunting, beekeeping, and medicinal plants sale.

=== Hydropower plant ===
In 2016 hydropower plant was built between Moglicë, Elbasan County and Big Okshtun, Dibër County — nearby the united school "Hasan Moglica".

== Language ==
Albanian is spoken in the historic village.

== Note ==
Moglicë: In writing context, its name can be found sometimes as Moglice, Muglic or Muglicë.

== Gallery ==
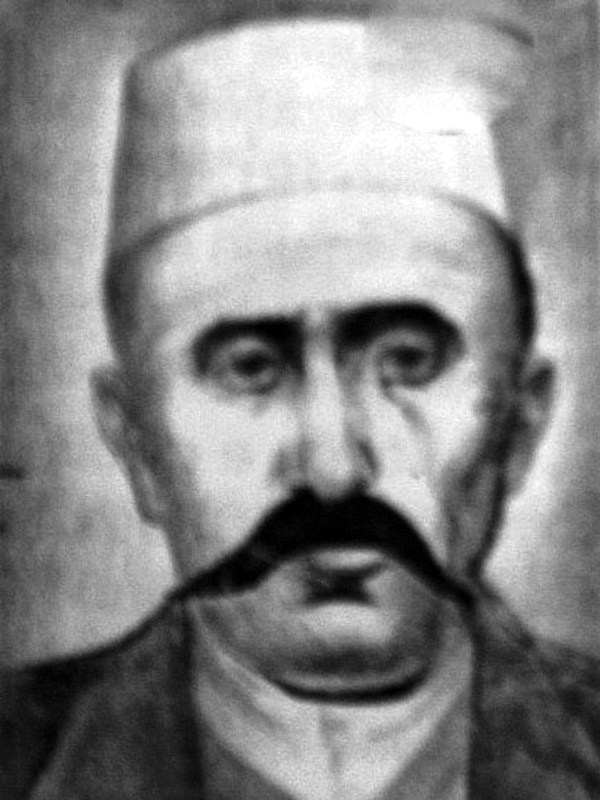
Teacher Hasan Moglica (1854-1915) — an Albanian scholar, educator, leader, engineer, philosopher, patriot, nationalist figure and the martyr of Albanian language and nation. (Born in 1854 in Moglicë)

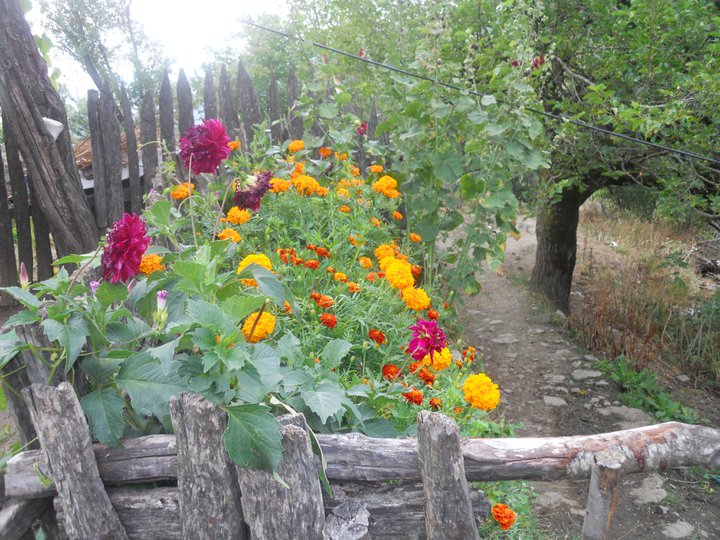
Moglicë is a historic village in Steblevë commune, Librazhd District, Elbasan County, Albania
