= Stëblevë =

Stëblevë Стеблево
- Administrative unit
- Location within Albania
- Coordinates: 41°20′N 20°29′E
- Country: Albania
- County: Elbasan
- Municipality: Librazhd

Population (2011)
  - Administrative unit: 809
- Time zone: UTC+1 (CET)
  - Summer (DST): UTC+2 (CEST)

Stëblevë (Bulgarian and Macedonian: Стеблево, romanized: Steblevo) is a village and a former municipality in the Elbasan County in eastern Albania. At the 2015 local government reform it became a subdivision of the municipality Librazhd. The population at the 2011 census was 809. The municipal unit consists of the villages Borovë, Llangë, Moglicë, Prodan, Sebisht, Steblevë and Zabzun.

== History ==
Steblevë appears in the Ottoman defter of 1467 as a village in the vilayet of Golloborda with 13 households that produced 776 ducats per annum. The register displayed mixed Albanian and Slavic anthroponymy, with instances of individuals bearing both Slavic and Albanian names (e.g., Petko Gjonko): Kojo Porteviri, Martini son of Petra, Miho Pishtaj, Petko Gjonko (possibly, Gjoneko), Gjon Mathinevi, Bogiçi brother of Gjoni, Devasili, Nikolla son of Devasili, Bogdo Jerakari, Kolë Vlladini, Staneci, Simko Çermenika, and Vasko grandson or nephew (unclear) of Petko.

According to local legends, the village was founded by three families of cattle breeders from the village of Magarevo. Subsequently, the population increased, with many converting to Islam.

In the Ethnography of the Provinces of Adrianople, Monastir and Thessaloniki, published in Constantinople in 1878 and reflecting the statistics of the male population from 1873, Stébléo is listed as a village with 150 households with 150 Bulgarian inhabitants and 200 Pomak inhabitants. In 1900, Vasil Kanchov gathered and compiled statistics on demographics in the area and reported that the village of Stëblevë was inhabited by about 380 Bulgarian Christians and 400 Bulgarian Muslims. According to the secretary of the Bulgarian Exarchate Dimitar Mishev ("La Macedoine et sa Population Chrétienne") in 1905 there were 396 Bulgarian Exarchists in Steblevo and there was a Bulgarian school in the village. According to statistics from the Debarski Glas newspaper, in 1911 there were 53 Bulgarian Exarchist and 1 Greek Patriarchist houses as well as 220 Pomak houses in Steblevo. In a report by Srebren Poppetrov, chief inspector-organizer of the church-school work of the Bulgarians in Albania, from August 1930 Stebleno is marked as a village with 100 houses, some of which are Orthodox Bulgarian and the rest Pomak. In 1939, Petre Stankov, on behalf of 9 Bulgarian houses in the village, signed a petition from 19 villages in the region to the Bulgarian Queen Joanna, asking for her intervention to protect the locals.

== Demographics ==
The villages of Zabzun, Borovë, Llangë, Moglicë, Prodan are located in the Stëblevë administrative unit and two villages are inhabited by Slavic populations: Stëblevë, which is inhabited solely by a Slavic speaking population that according to some authors contains Torbeš. Sebisht is inhabited by an Albanian population that dominates demographically in the village and contains three families from the Torbeš and Orthodox Macedonians population. The Torbeš and Orthodox Macedonian population of the area are speakers of an Eastern South Slavic language (Macedonian or Bulgarian)

== Notable people ==
- Hazis Lila, Albanian religious and educational activist.
