= Hasan Moglica =

Albanian educator and nationalist figure

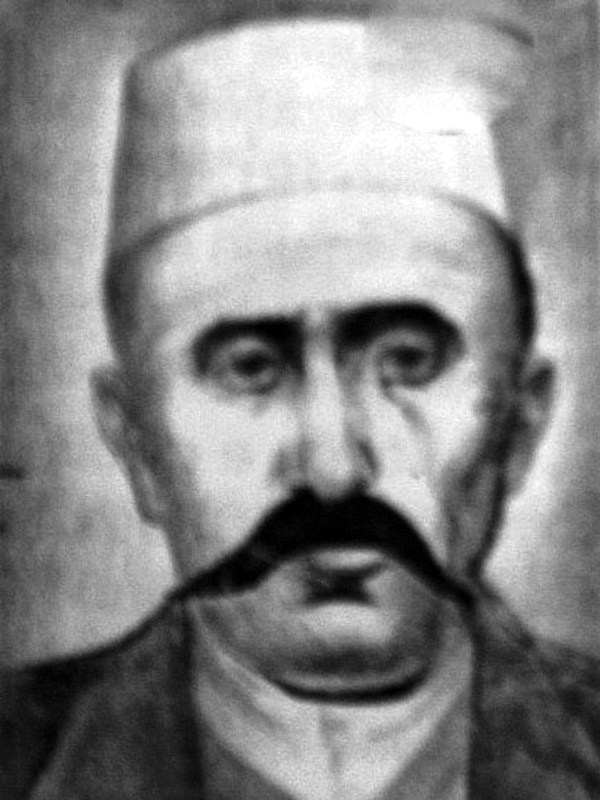
- Born: Hasan Sulë Shermeti Moglica; 1854; Moglicë, Ottoman Empire today in Albania
- Died: 15 June 1915
- Occupation(s): Scholar, educator, engineer, philosopher, patriot, nationalist figure and the martyr of Albanian language and nation

Hoxhë Hasan Moglica commonly referred as Hoxhë Moglica, was an Albanian alim, müderris, engineer, philosopher, patriot, nationalist figure and proclaimed as martyr of Albanian language and nation by the Albanian government.

== Life and work ==
=== Early life ===
He was born Hasan Sulë Shermeti Moglica, in Moglicë village of Okshtun highland, part of lower Diber County, today's Albania, back then part of the Sanjak of Dibra of the Ottoman Empire. His family had migrated in the area from Dibër e madhe, the administrative center of that time. His father was a construction master and would take Hasan with him at a young age. Beside helping his father, he registered in the local schools. First, he attended the meytep (elementary religious school) in Peqin, and considering his results and the will of learning his father registered him in the Madrasa of Elbasan. There he learned the Turkish, old Ottoman, and Persian language. After finishing the madrasa, he went to Istanbul where he studied theology and engineering. Upon his return home after the studies, he started working an imam of the local mosque. He was also involved in local engineering works, as drainage systems, watermills, etc.

=== Nationalist activity ===
Inspired by the National Awakening movement, Moglica was deeply involved in the attempts of spreading the Albanian education. He was a delegate of Gollobordë region in the League of Prizren of June 1878. Moglica was one of the organizers and main participants of several meetings which the Dibra branch of the League held during the autumn of 1878, 14 October, 1 November, and most important the one of 20 October, known as Meeting of Dibra, Albanian: Kuvendi i Dibrës, in the Albanian historiography. Here the local leaders would decide the specifics of implementing the League's decision. The meeting protested once again against the decision of the Congress of Berlin, and demanded the unification of all Albanian sanjaks into a single vilayet. Even after the suppression of the League, he continued his activities in the areas around Dibër, Elbasan, and Gollobordë. He had his own çeta of guerrillas. He would be appointed as müderris in Gollobordë.

=== An educator ===
Moglica was involved with spreading of the Albanian language and education in the early 1900s. He contributed in the delivery and distribution of around 5,000 Albanian primers, printed by the Albanian colonies of Bucharest, Sofia, and Istanbul. He participated in the Congress of Dibra as a representative of Gollobordë (together with Dan Agë Cami and Hazis Hoxhë Efendi Lila), and in the Congress of Elbasan of 1909, known as the Congress of the Albanian Schools (Albanian: Kongresi i Shkollave Shqipe). The Normal School of Elbasan which was established by the Congress had many students from Moglica's zone of influence. Due to his work and sponsorship, there were 9 students from Gollobordë out of 29 in total during the first academic year. On his personal initiative, a local meeting was organized in Fushë-Klenjë of Gollobordë (Albanian: Kuvendi i Fushë-Klenjës). There he propagandized and explained to the local population the importance of education, the Albanian alphabet and schools, and urged them to send their children in the newly established schools. Moglica opened a school in his area in 1904, and had transformed his 28-room house into a huge library, which was burnt down by the Turkish soldiers of Turgut Pasha in 1908.

=== Arrest and execution ===
With the First Balkan War, the Dibra region was invaded by the Serbian army. This would be followed by the turmoils of World War I where several military and paramilitary fractions would raid the area. In 1914, Moglica would be arrested by the supporters of Essad Pasha Toptani, influential in the area and closely related to Serbia. They sent him to Elbasan, and in order to humiliate him threw a saddle on him and made him walk in the streets of Elbasan despite his age. He would stay imprisoned for 3 months, and could escape only after the turmoil created when the Serbian army marched toward Elbasan against the Pro-Ottoman rebels of Haxhi Qamili. He returned to his village in early 1915, but remained in the "wanted" list by the Serbian army, who burnt his home as well. His family was displaced further south in Çermenikë region. The Serbians arrested his only son Osman, a local teacher as well, and asked Moglica to surrender in exchange for his son's life. Moglica agreed and the exchange was made. He was offered the option to sign a "petition" demanding that the western part of Dibra regions including the localities of Kolgrek, Kaptinë, Vervjak, Qafë Buall, and Qafë-Murrë, till Lurë to be annexed to Serbia. After declining the offer, he was put to dig his own grave, shot, and buried alive while still in agony.

== Acknowledgment ==
In 1975, he was decorated by the Parliament of Albania as "Distinguished Patriot" (Albanian: Atdhetar i shquar), along other important figures as Ismail Qemali, Abdyl Frashëri, Sami Frashëri, Naim Frashëri, Luigj Gurakuqi, etc. The Dibra newspaper declared as "Dibran of the century" in a voting-based survey in 1999. A museum dedicated to him is built in his village in Moglicë, Elbasan. Also, the united school in Okshtun i Madh (Engl. 'Big Okshtun'), in Bulqizë District has been named "Hasan Moglica".

== See also ==
- Vehbi Dibra
- Ismail Qemali
- Abdyl Frashëri
- Sami Frashëri
- Naim Frashëri
- Luigj Gurakuqi
