= Qukës =

- Administrative unit
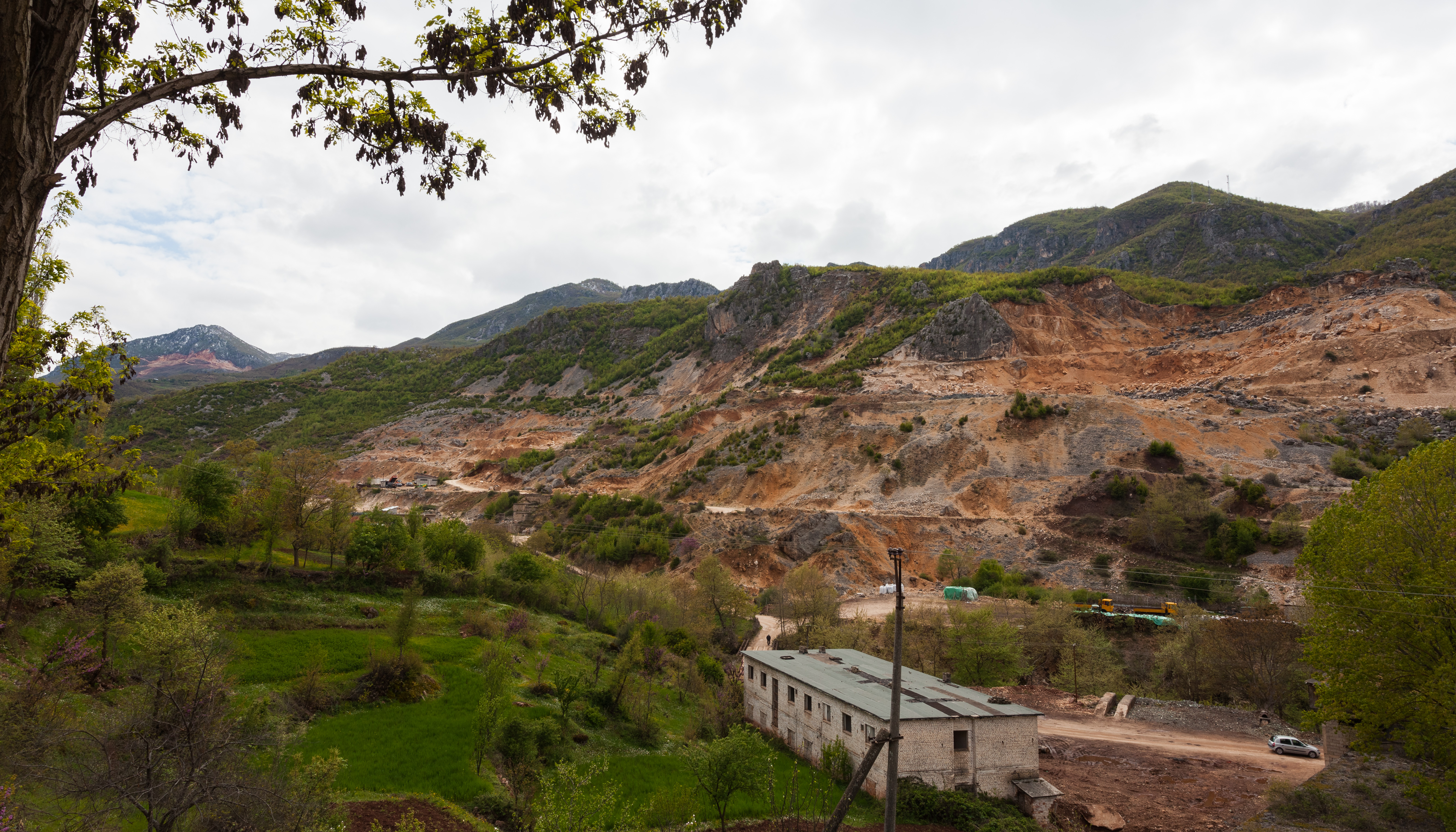
- The Chrome mine in Qukës with a partial view of the village

- Location within Albania
- Coordinates: 41°5′N 20°26′E
- Country: Albania
- County: Elbasan
- Municipality: Prrenjas

Population (2011)
  - Administrative unit: 8,211
- Time zone: UTC+1 (CET)
  - Summer (DST): UTC+2 (CEST)

Qukës is a former municipality in the Elbasan County, eastern Albania. At the 2015 local government reform it became a subdivision of the municipality Prrenjas. The population at the 2011 census was 8,211. The municipal unit consists of the villages Berzheshte, Dritaj, Fanje, Gurre, Karkavec, Menik, Pishkash, Pishkash Veri, Qukës-Shkumbin, Qukës-Skenderbej and Skroske. In the later Ottoman era about a quarter of the city of Qukes itself was Bektashi. Via Egnatia [5] passes through Qukës, which was a very important trade route in the Balkans during the conquest of the Roman Empire.
