= Stravaj =

- Administrative unit
- Location within Albania
- Coordinates: 41°0′N 20°25′E
- Country: Albania
- County: Elbasan
- Municipality: Prrenjas

Population (2011)
  - Administrative unit: 2,427
- Time zone: UTC+1 (CET)
  - Summer (DST): UTC+2 (CEST)

Stravaj is a village and a former municipality in the Elbasan County, eastern Albania. At the 2015 local government reform it became a subdivision of the municipality Prrenjas. The population at the 2011 census was 2,427. The municipal unit consists of the villages Farret, Gaferr, Shqiponje, Sopot, Stranik and Stravaj.
