= Orenjë =

- Administrative unit
- Location within Albania
- Coordinates: 41°17′N 20°12′E
- Country: Albania
- County: Elbasan
- Municipality: Librazhd

Population (2011)
  - Administrative unit: 3,883
- Time zone: UTC+1 (CET)
  - Summer (DST): UTC+2 (CEST)

Orenjë is a village and a former municipality in the Elbasan County, eastern Albania. At the 2015 local government reform it became a subdivision of the municipality Librazhd. The population at the 2011 census was 3,883. The municipal unit consists of the villages Ballegjin, Floq, Funares, Gurakuq, Mexixe, Neshte, Orenjë, Rinas, Zdrajsh and Zdrajsh Veri.

== Notable people ==
- Hafiz Sabri Koçi - Albanian Grand Mufti
