= Qendër Librazhd =

- Administrative unit
- Location within Albania
- Coordinates: 41°12′N 20°19′E
- Country: Albania
- County: Elbasan
- Municipality: Librazhd

Population (2011)
  - Administrative unit: 8,551
- Time zone: UTC+1 (CET)
  - Summer (DST): UTC+2 (CEST)

Qendër Librazhd is a former municipality in the Elbasan County, eastern Albania. At the 2015 local government reform it became a subdivision of the municipality Librazhd. The population at the 2011 census was 8,551. The municipal unit consists of the villages Arez, Babje, Dorëz, Dragostunjë, Gizavesh, Kuterman, Librazhd Katund, Librazhd Qendër, Marinaj, Qarishte, Spathar and Togez.
