= Halit Berzeshta =

Albanian warlord and activist involved in the Albanian National Awakening

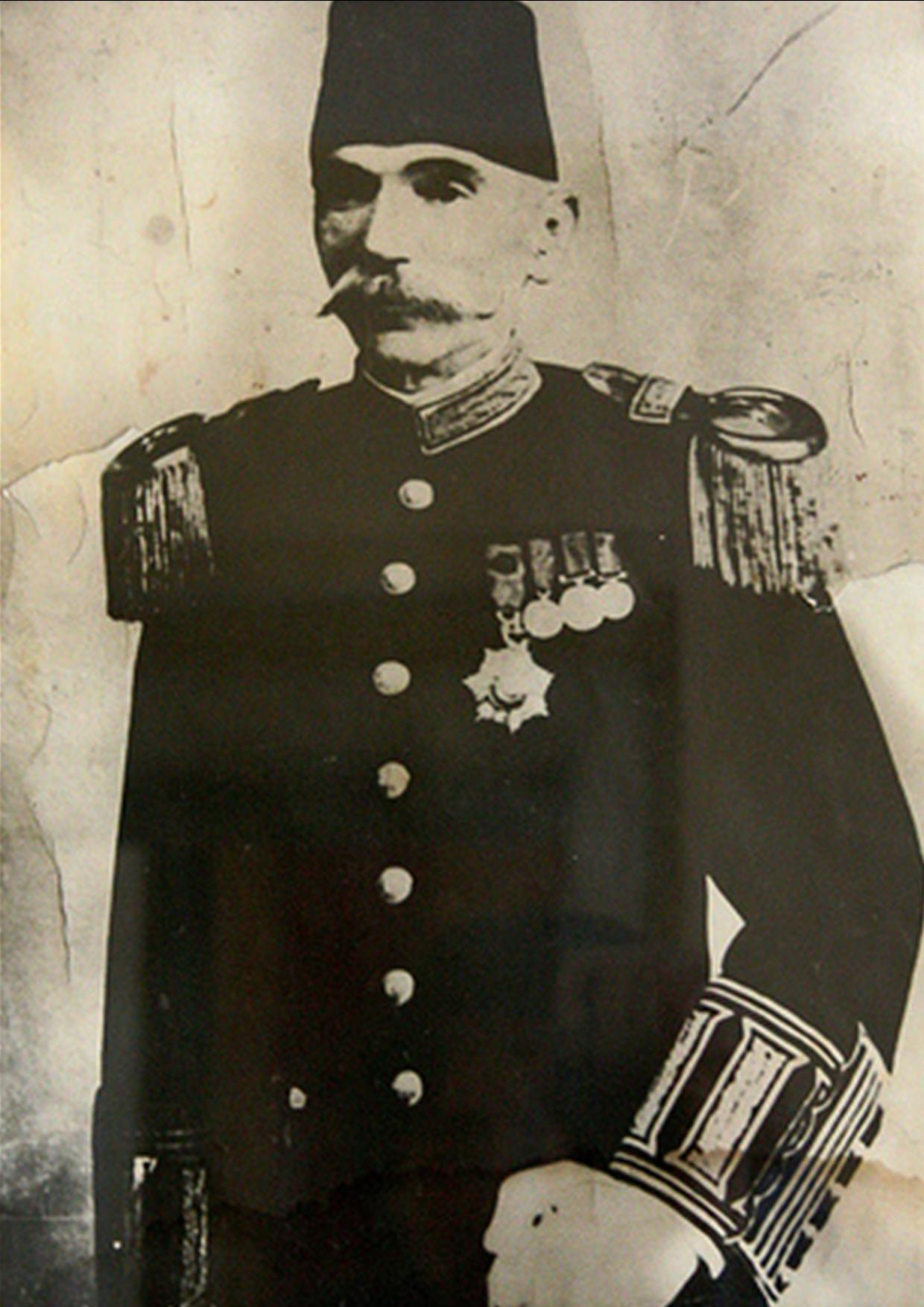
Halit Bej Berzeshta, 1840-1909

Halit Bey Bërzeshta (1840 – 1909) was an Ottoman Albanian military physician and activist of the Albanian National Awakening.

== Biography ==
Bërzeshta was born in Bërzeshta, Vilayet of Monastir, Ottoman Albania (today Librazhd District, Albania) in 1840.
He was a member of the Secret Association of the Albanians of Monastir (Albanian: Organizata e Fshehtë e Shqiptareve të Manastirit), the Secret Committee for the Liberation of Albania, and one of the main Albanian activists in Monastir, where he joined forces with Bajo Topulli supporting guerrilla fighting against the Ottoman government. He died in 1909.
