= Prrenjas =

- Municipality
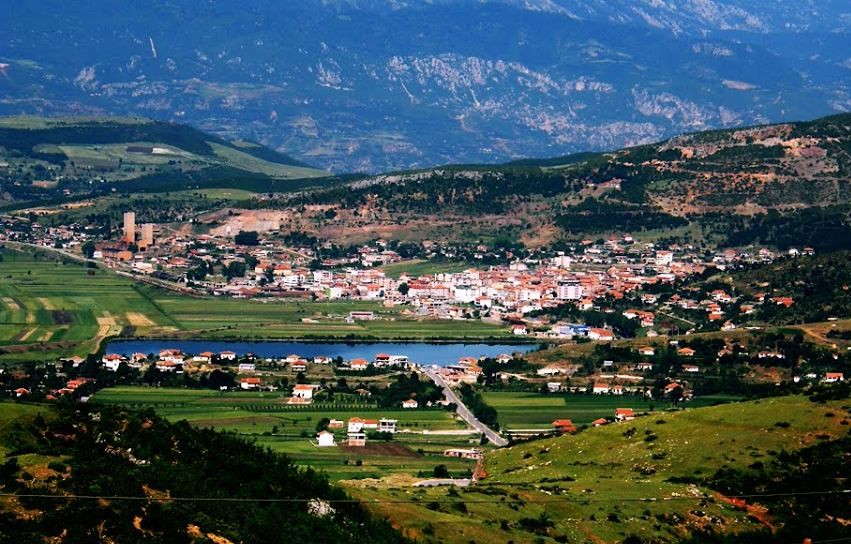

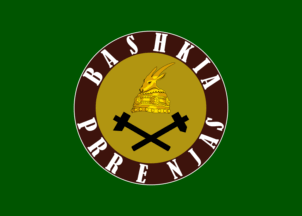
- Flag Emblem

- Location within Albania
- Coordinates: 41°4′N 20°33′E
- Country: Albania
- County: Elbasan

Government
  - Mayor: Nuri Belba (PS)

Area
  - Municipality: 323.17 km^{2} (124.78 sq mi)
  - Administrative unit: 18.3 km^{2} (7.1 sq mi)
- Elevation: 590 m (1,940 ft)

Population (2011)
  - Municipality: 24,906
  - Municipality density: 77.068/km^{2} (199.60/sq mi)
  - Administrative unit: 5,847
  - Administrative unit density: 320/km^{2} (828/sq mi)
- Time zone: UTC+1 (CET)
  - Summer (DST): UTC+2 (CEST)
- Postal Code: 3403-3404
- Area Code: (0)591
- Website: www.bashkiaprrenjas.gov.al

Prrenjas (also written Përrenjas, Albanian definite form: Përrenjasi) is a town and a municipality in Elbasan County, eastern Albania. The municipality was formed at the 2015 local government reform by the merger of the former municipalities Prrenjas, Qukës, Rrajcë and Stravaj, that became municipal units. The seat of the municipality is the town Prrenjas. The total population is 24,906 (2011 census), in a total area of 323.17 km^{2}. The population of the former municipality at the 2011 census was 5,847.

== History ==
The area around Prrenjas has significant historical importance as a strategic point along the Via Egnatia, the ancient Roman road connecting Istanbul and Durrës. During the Middle Ages, the region was part of the borderlands between the Byzantine Empire, the Bulgarian Empire, and later the Albanian principalities.

=== Etymology ===
While popular folk etymology often links the name to the Albanian word përrua (def. përrenjtë – "streams"), there are two main theories regarding its origin:

- Linguistic Theory: Most linguists, including Afanasiy Selishchev, suggest a Slavic origin from the word Prĕnosъ (Old Church Slavonic: прѣносъ), meaning "portage," "crossing," or "the act of carrying across." This reflects the town's geography as a critical mountain pass where goods and caravans had to be transported across the slopes of the Jabllanicë mountain range. The modern form Prrenjas is the result of the phonological adaptation of the Slavic "yat" (ѣ) and the palatalization of the consonant "n" into "nj" (as seen in the Albanian spelling rr and nj).
- Legendary Theory: According to local tradition and early biographers of Skanderbeg, such as Clement Clarke Moore, the name is associated with the Battle of Torvioll (1444). Legend says that so many Ottoman and Albanian soldiers were killed in the field of Domosdova that their blood flowed like "streams" (përrenj), thus giving the settlement its name.

=== Medieval and Modern History ===
In the period of the Ottoman Albanian wars, the area where the city rises was called Torviolli. The native hero, Gjergj Kastrioti Skanderbeg, before heading for battle (the battle is known in history as Battle of Torvioll) told to his fighters, that the battle must be won. A significant history has been written here.

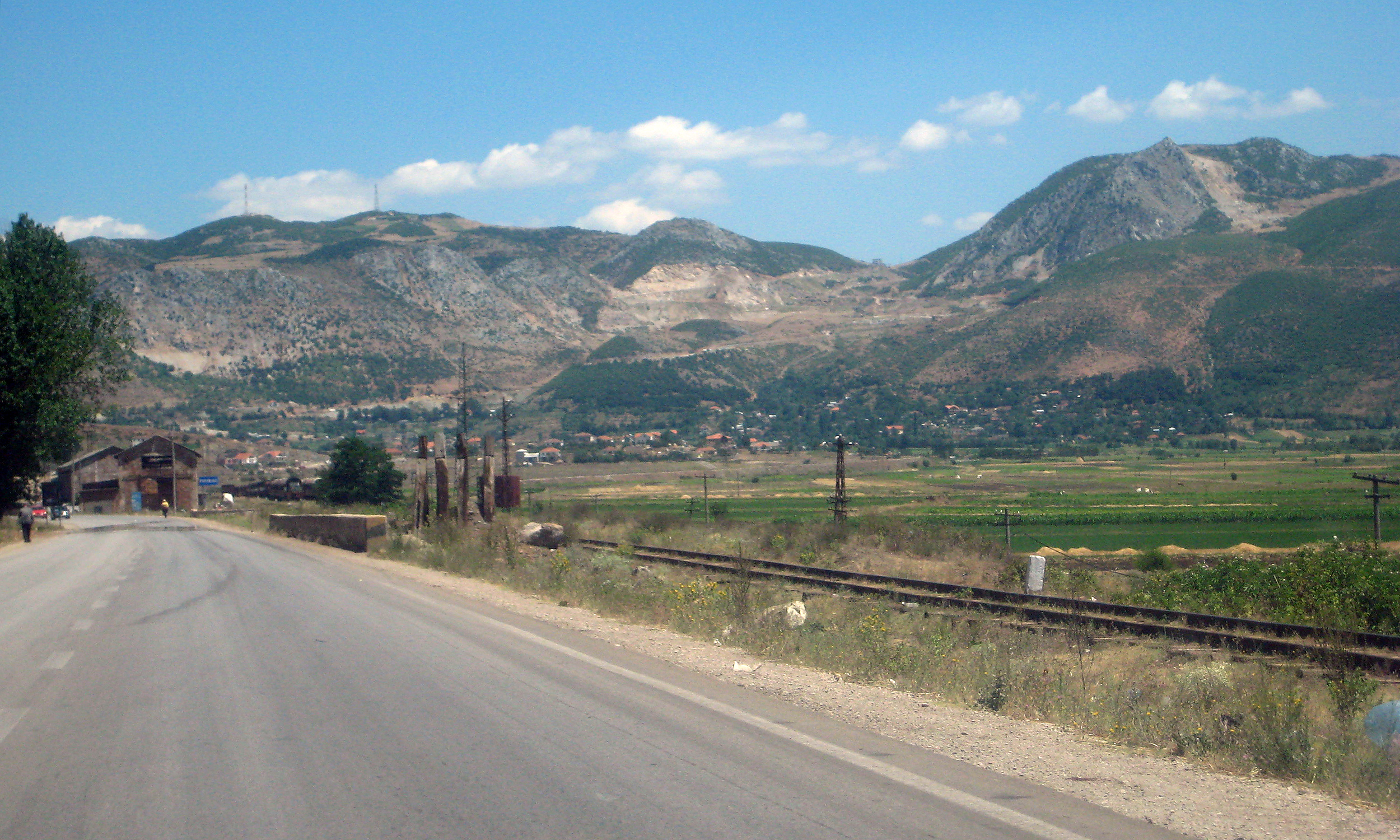
The Field of Domosdova (today), where the Battle of Torvioll took place

The people of Prrenjas also participated in the Albanian Declaration of Independence on the 28th of November 1912.

=== Historical Places ===
- Via Egnatia
- Skanderbeg's Table
- Domosdova field (where the Battle of Torvioll took place)

== Points of Interest ==
- Shebenik-Jabllanice National Park
- Skanderbeg's Table
- Statue of Miners
- Abandoned mine of Prrenjas

== Transportation ==
=== Bus ===
There are buses in Prrenjas that can take riders in other cities in Albania and other countries.

=== Trains ===
There is no train line that can goes to or from Prrenjas. Elbasan-Pogradec extension has been closed.

=== Highways ===
The only main road in Prrenjas is the SH3 (State Road 3) that starts in Tirana and ends in Korçë and passes by Prrenjas.

== Sports ==
Prrenja's main football team, KF Domozdova, was founded in 1923 and disbanded in 2018 due to financial problems. Following the disbandment of the club, the city stadium was demolished to make way for the construction of the new city center.

== Notable people ==
- Halit Berzeshta, physician and activist of the Albanian National Awakening
- Qybra Sokoli, partisan during the War of Liberation
