= Librazhd =

- Municipality
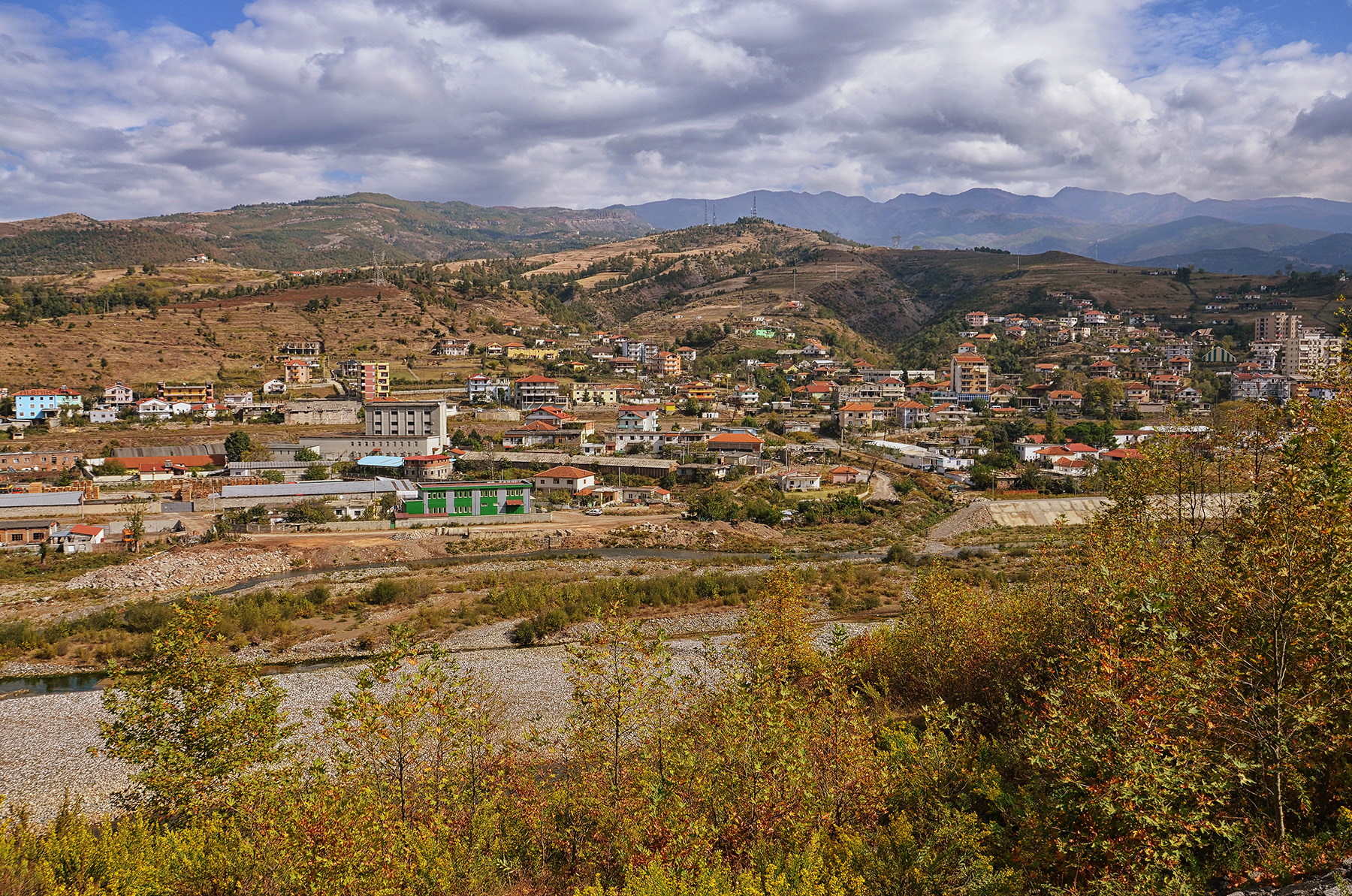

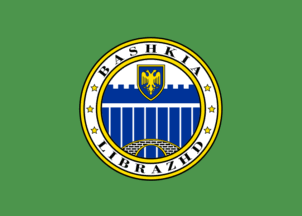
- Flag Emblem

- Location within Albania
- Coordinates: 41°11′N 20°19′E
- Country: Albania
- County: Elbasan

Government
  - Mayor: Mariglen Disha (PS)

Area
  - Municipality: 793.99 km^{2} (306.56 sq mi)
- Elevation: 249 m (817 ft)

Population (2023)
  - Municipality: 23,312
  - Municipality density: 29.361/km^{2} (76.044/sq mi)
  - Administrative unit: 6,787
- Time zone: UTC+1 (CET)
  - Summer (DST): UTC+2 (CEST)
- Postal Code: 3401-3413
- Area Code: (0)514
- Website: bashkialibrazhd.gov.al

Librazhd (Albanian definite form: Librazhdi) is a town and a municipality in Elbasan County, southeast Albania. The municipality was reformed at the 2015 local government reform by the merger of the former municipalities Hotolisht, Librazhd, Lunik, Orenjë, Polis, Qendër Librazhd and Stëblevë, that became municipal units. The seat of the municipality is the town Librazhd. The total population is 23,312, in a total area of 793.99 km^{2} (306.56 sq mi). The population of the municipal unit as of the 2023 census is 6,787.

Historical population
Year	Pop.	±%
1955	801	—
1960	961	+20.0%
1969	2,700	+181.0%
1979	3,200	+18.5%
1989	5,018	+56.8%
2001	7,216	+43.8%
2011	6,937	−3.9%
2023	6,787	−2.2%

Librazhd is the nearest town to the Shebenik National Park.

== History ==
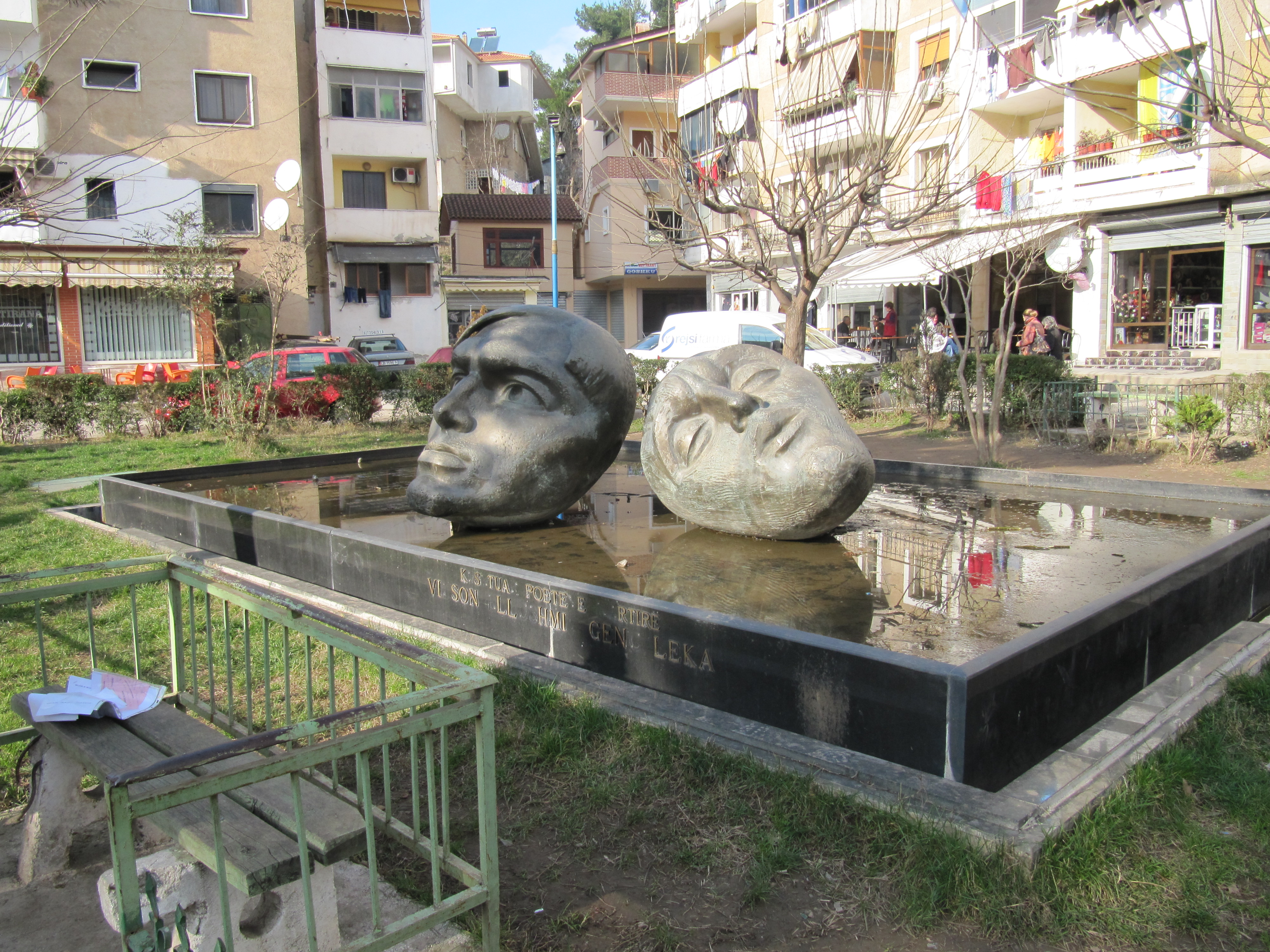
Monument in honor of two poets Vilson Blloshmi and Genc Leka; In 1977 they were executed by the communist regime.

Librazhd (Liburazhda) is attested in the Ottoman defter of 1467 as a village belonging to the timar of Karagöz in the vilayet of Çermeniça. The settlement had a total of 33 households, represented by the following household heads: Ilia Berishi, Pop Mihali, Gjergj Vaskuqi, Ivo Stajo, Nikolla Todini, Miho Gjirgashi, Todor Sqavi, Mihal Arassi (Arrasi), Gjurko Papa Sedani (possibly, Papasdani), Gjergj Arassi, Gjergj Gjonjo (possibly, Gjonevi), Miladin Simko, Dimitri Gjinko, Todor Kalini, Petër Simko, Ivo Nikoto, Pop Nikolla, Todorec Nikoto, Stan Mali, Dimitri Kozmo, Petko Stajko, Stajo son of Semini, Gjin Franku, Bogdo Kalini, Frank Radoslani, Gjon Prokopi, Petër Rado, Gjon Birko, Simo Birko, Stan Kaliqi, Pejko Stajo, Miho Makini (possibly, Magjini), Gjergj Budisha, Manec Berishi, Dimitri Kostovi, Gjoni son of Rado, Dimitri son of Miho, Dimitri son of Aleko, and Nenada son of Niko.

Librazhd was one of the newest cities in Albania and was proclaimed as such on 18 February 1960. Librazhd is also famous for being connected to the Via Egnatia road that stretched from Istanbul all the way on to Durrës. The people of Librazhd also participated in the Albanian Declaration of Independence in the 28 of November 1912. During World War II, two battalions of the National Liberation Movement ambushed defeated Nazi Germany troops near Librazhd, killing over 200 German soldiers.

== Transportation ==
=== Trains ===
There is no train line that can go to or from Librazhd. Elbasan-Pogradec extension has been closed.

=== Highways ===
The only main road in Librazhd is the SH 3 (Albanian: Rruga Shtetërore SH 3, lit. 'State road SH 3') that starts in Tirana and ends in Korçë and passes by Librazhd.

== Sports ==
The football club KF Sopoti, a team founded in 1948, is based in Librazhd. The team plays its home matches at Sopoti Stadium, built in 1964 and capable of accommodating 3,000 spectators. While participating in the Albanian Second Division group A, the team faced challenges with the outdated stadium during the 2017-18 season. However, the stadium has undergone renovations since then.

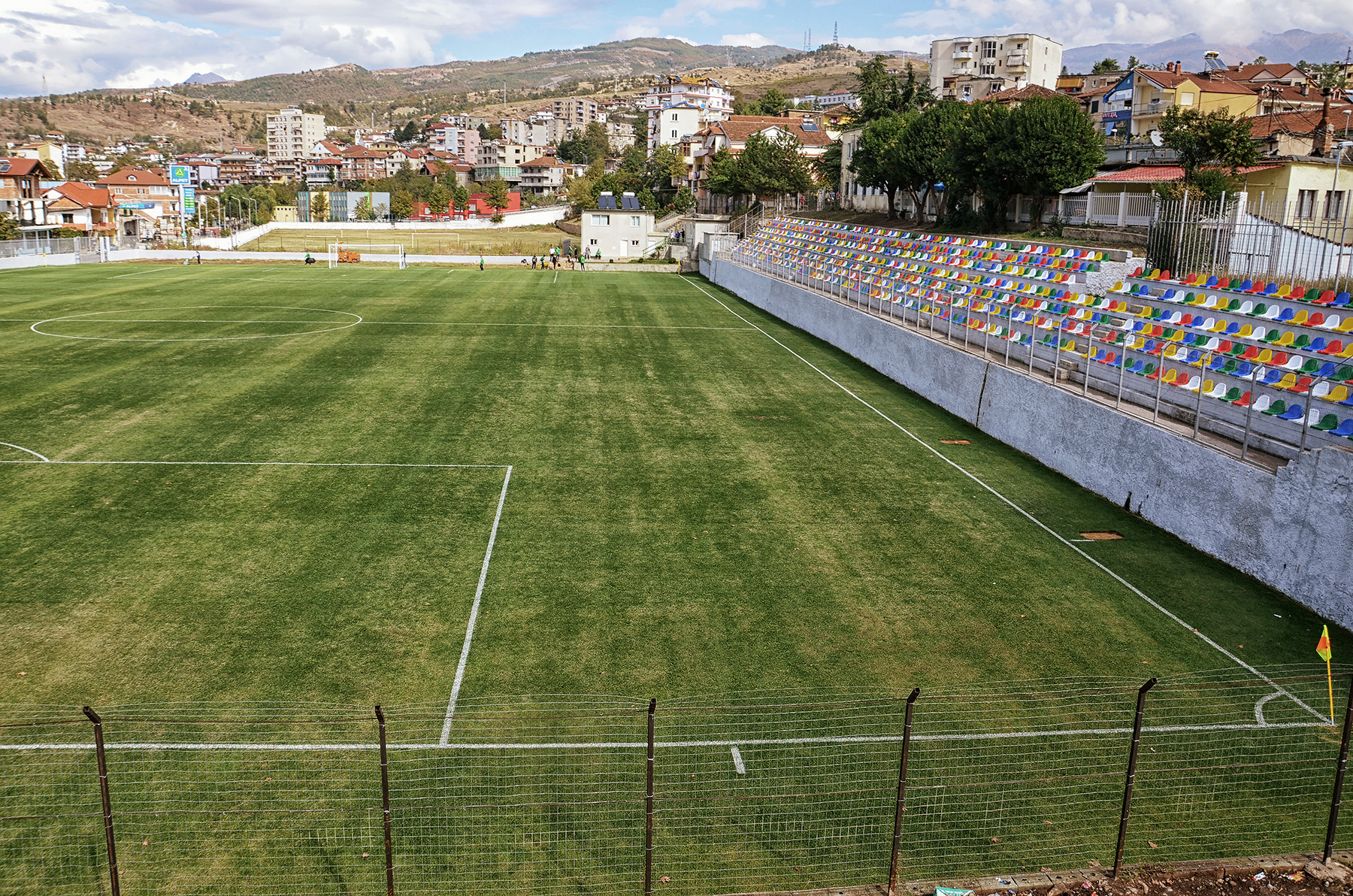
Sopoti Stadium

== Notable residents ==
- Taulant Balla (born 1977), politician
