= Çermenikë =

Upland in central Albania

Coordinates: 41.25°N 20.25°E

Çermenikë or Çermenika is an upland northeast of Elbasan, in central Albania.

In the Middle Ages, as Tzernikon or Tzernikos it was an episcopal see of the Patriarchate of Constantinople, as a suffragan see of the Archbishopric of Dyrrhachium.

In the medieval period the upland used to be inhabited completely by Catholics. The Roman-Catholic church then erected an episcopal see, which is today the Titular See of Tzernicus and which was a suffragan of the Metropolitan See of Achrida (Ohrid).

In the mid-15th century, the region was ruled by Gjergj Arianiti, one of the main leaders of the Albanian resistance to the Ottoman Empire.

In the late Ottoman period it is reported that the region had 12 villages and 3000 Bektashi inhabitants.

In World War II, the area was a centre of the Albanian Resistance to the German occupation.
