= Ilzenberg Manor =

Building in Ilzenbergas, Lithuania

- Ilzenbergo dvaras (Lithuanian)
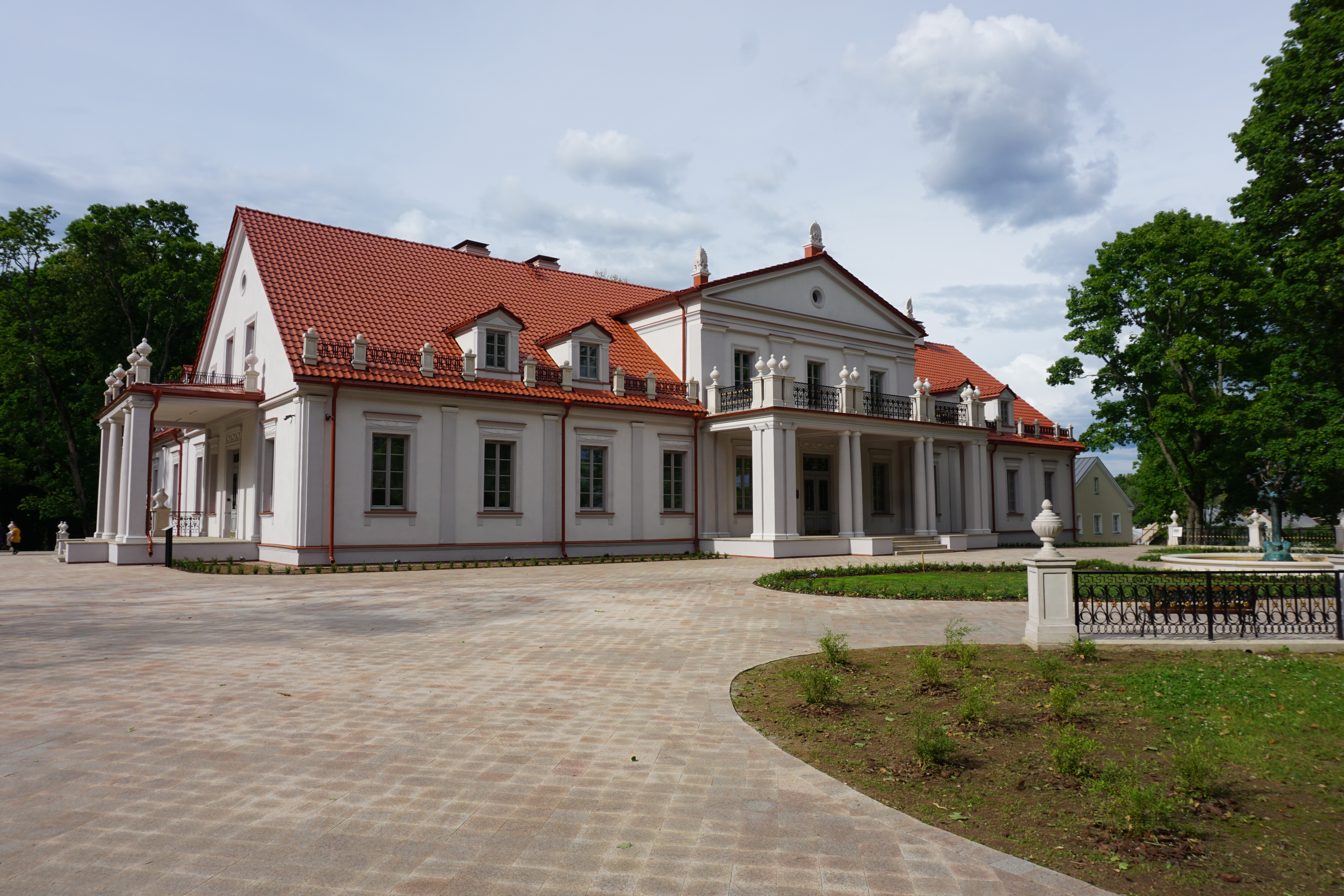
- Ilzenberg Manor main façade

- Location within Lithuania
- Interactive map of Ilzenberg Manor
- 56°09′35″N 25°31′28″E
- Location: Ilzenbergas, Lithuania

History
- Founded: 1515
- Founder: Berndt Kersenboick
- Built: 19th century
- Built for: Franz Georg Fuchs (Pranas Jurgis Fuksas)
- Original use: Manor

Site notes
- Architectural style: Neoclassical
- Restored: 1970–1972
- Website: www.pgm.lt

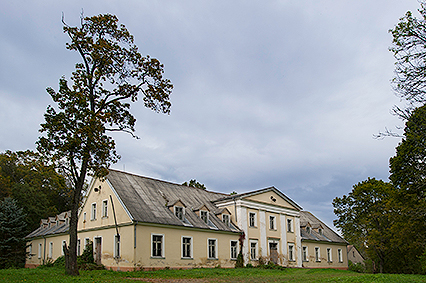
Ilzenberg Manor (before reconstruction)

Ilzenberg Manor is a former residential manor in Rokiškis district, Lithuania, near the border with Latvia. It is between Garajis and Apvalasai lakes. Manor is a state-protected cultural heritage object of regional significance with a designation number 555.

== History ==
=== Early history ===
Ilzenberg Manor was first mentioned in historical sources in 1515 when it was founded by a Baron of the Livonian Order, Berndt Kersenboick I. The baron possessed 615 ha of land and ruled over a territory of 2,234 ha occupied by local peasant crofts. Berndt Kersenboick (probably Berndt I's son or grandson) owned Ilzenberg until his death (c1616).

The manor was inherited by Berndt's wife Ana, who died in 1680, but by that time the owners of Ilzenberg Manor had changed several times, and Ana herself lived somewhere nearby. She was buried between Ilzenberg and Alksne.

In 1642, the intendant of Wenden (Cēsis) Castle, Nicolaus von Korff (1585–1659), acquired Alksniai Manor, situated in the neighbourhood of Ilzenberg, from Wilhelm Heyck. The act of purchase was signed in Vabalninkas, a witness to the transaction was Matthias von Orgies, whose son, Adam, later became the landlord of Ilzenberg Manor (the first of this family).

Nicolaus von Korff married Katarina von Effern (1591–1657), coming from Nereta (Nerft) near Ilzenberg and received Ilzenberg Manor. In 1653, their daughter Agnesa (1619–1698) married Ernst von Sacken (1606–1679).

The digest of Baltic noble families lists Ernst von Sacken as the lord of the Ilzenberg Manor in 1653–1677. He probably became the lord of the manor through his marriage to Agnesa. In 1677, their daughter Maria Gertruda von Sacken married Captain Magnus Ernst von Korff. Ilzenberg Manor then passed to the von Korff family.

=== The von Korff Family ===
The digest of Baltic noble families identifies Magnus Ernst von Korff as the landlord of Ilzenberg from 1677 to 1687. After the death of his wife Maria Gertruda von Sacken, in 1687, the new lord of Ilzenberg Manor, Magnus Ernst von Korff (probably Magnus Ernst von Korff I's son), married Louisa Elisabeth von Rummel. She inherited her parents' manor where, together with her husband, she settled.

It was then decided to sell Ilzenberg Manor to the lord of the neighbouring Alksniai Manor, Adam von Orgies gen. Rutenberg (c1640-1697). On 17 October 1687, Adam von Orgies contacted Magnus Ernst von Korff and his wife Louise Elizabeth for the purchase of Ilzenberg. So the first owner of Ilzenberg Manor from the Orgies-Rutenberg family was Adam von Orgies.

=== The Orgies-Rutenberg Family ===
When Adam died, his eldest son, Friedrich Wilhelm (1679–1716) inherited Ilzenberg. The estate then went to his son, Christoph Georg Rutenberg (1712–1775), who is considered the pioneer of the Orgies-Rutenberg Ilzenberg family in the genealogy of the Orgies-Rutenberg family. In 1775 Johann Christoffer (1745–1808) inherited Ilzenberg as Christoph's eldest son. In Ilsen (1.7 km west of Ilzenberg) in about 1790, Johann built a Lutheran church (which was replaced by Georg Fridrich's widow in 1844 who built a new one that survives to our time.)

Ilzenberg was then inherited by Ernst Diedrich Victor von Orgies gen. Rutenberg, who in 1854 married Elizabeth von Klopman. Elizabeth didn't have children and became the last representative of the Orgies-Rutenberg family in Ilzenberg Manor. Ernst Diedrich sold Ilzenberg to Fuchs, a German engineer, who managed the estate between 1863 and 1896.^{[4]} Fuchs rebuilt the manor, which has remained virtually unchanged to this day. Ernst and Elizabeth von Orgies went to Paris and then to Naples where Ernst died in 1868.

=== The Dimša Family ===
In 1896, Eugeniusz Dimša (1853–1918) bought Ilzenberg Manor. Eugeniusz had studied at Jelgava Gymnasium and later graduated from the High School of Communications in St. Petersburg. While visiting his cousin, Eugeniusz met Livija Majoresku (1863–1946). In c1892 they married. Eugeniusz and Livija had three daughters: Janina (1894–1991), Livija (1899–1970) and Eugene (1902–1905).

After Eugeniusz died, in 1918, Ilzenberg was inherited by his wife Livija and two daughters, Janina and Livija. Livija-mother left with her daughters to place the urn with Eugenius' ashes in the family tomb. Shortly afterwards, the Dimša family went to Warsaw.

In March 1920, the Dimša family returned to the devastated Ilzenberg Estate, where Livija-mother and Livija-daughter spent the next twenty years. Ilzenberg belonged to daughters Livija and Janina until 1940.

=== The Soviet Period ===
With the Molotov–Ribbentrop Pact of 23 September 1939, the Soviet Union annexed Lithuania and began sovietization of the country.

The Dimša lands were confiscated and the family was threatened with exile. Therefore, in the autumn of 1940, Livija Dimša and her daughters and grandchildren moved to Vilnius to avoid arrest and exile.

== Restoration ==
In 2003, Ilzenberg Manor became private property. Restoration was started in December 2012 and involved reconstruction of the dilapidated buildings as well as restoration of the interior of the manor house. The main building of the property, a richly decorated house in classical style of the second half of the 19th century with its authentic cellars dating back to the 18th century, was opened to the public in 2017.

== Park ==
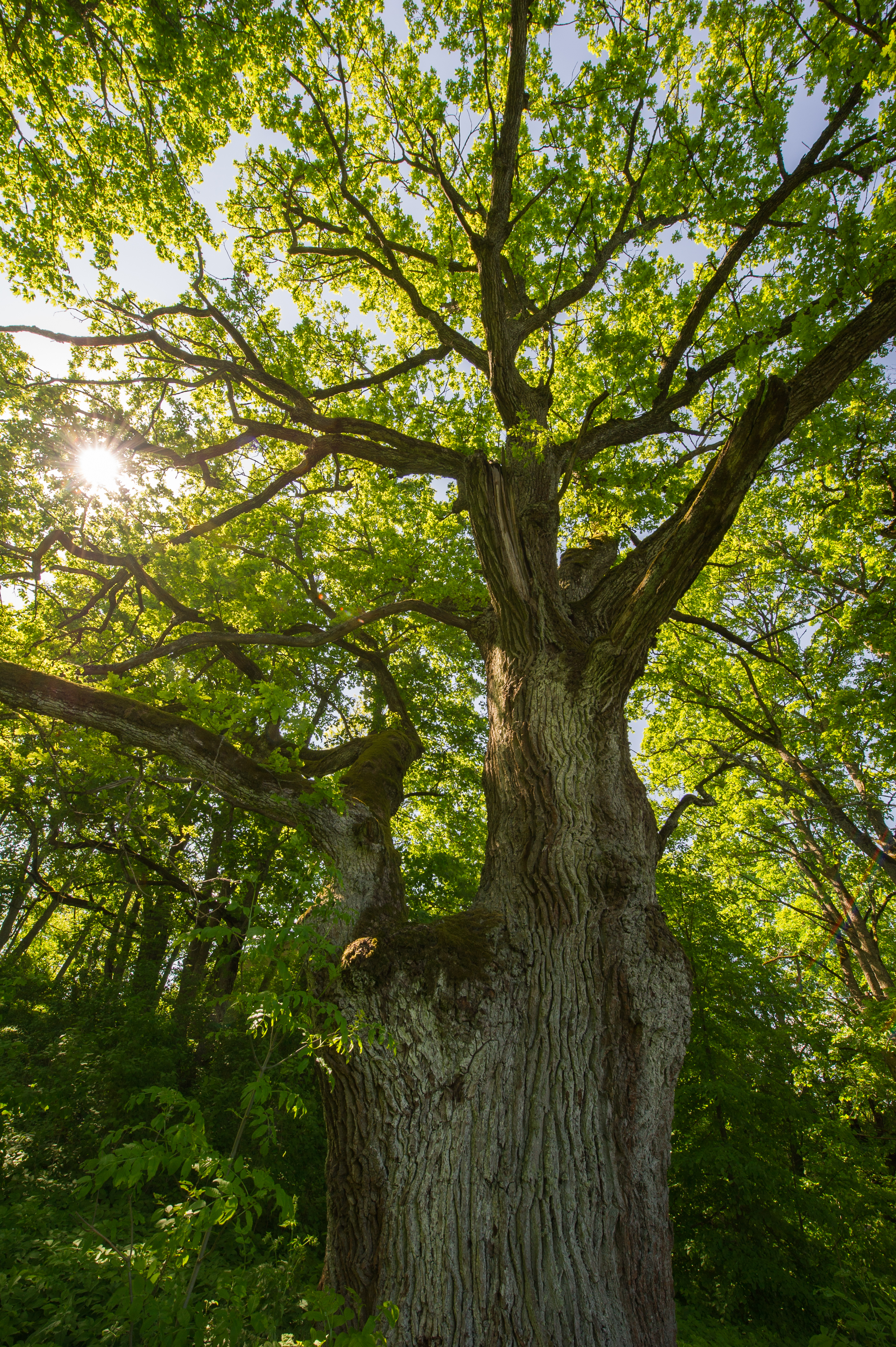
Ilzenberg oak

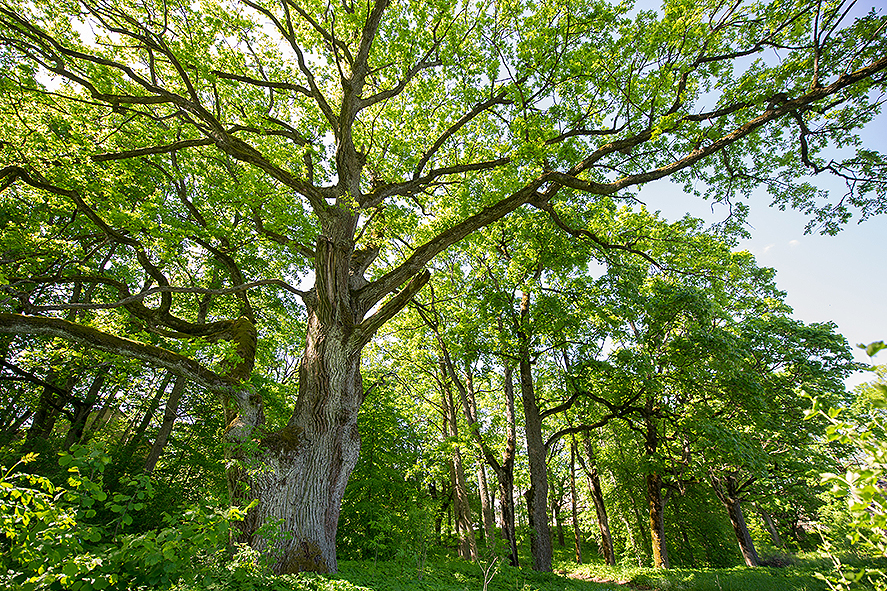
Ilzenberg oak

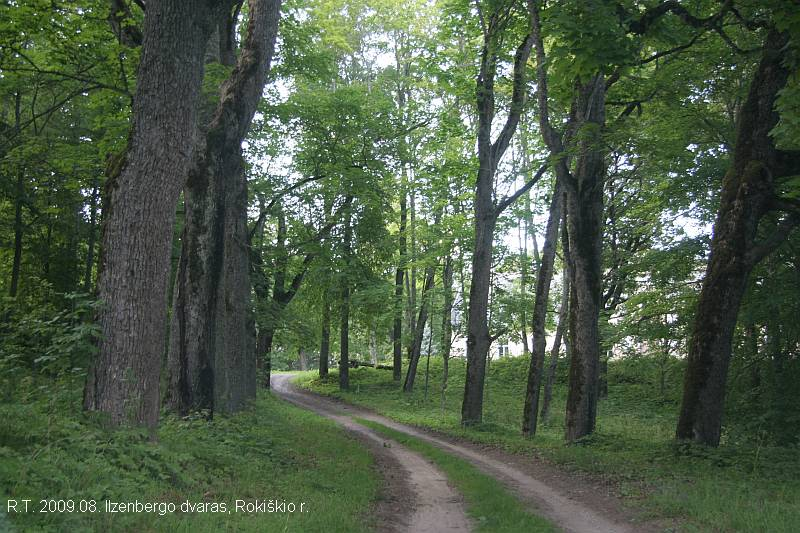

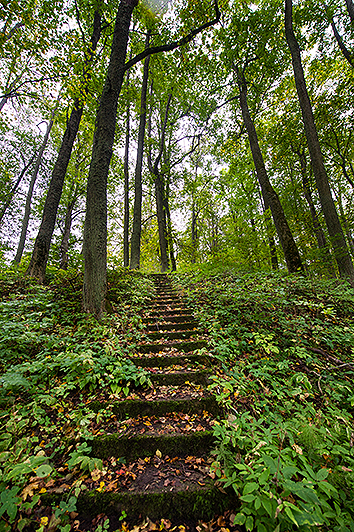

== Estate buildings ==
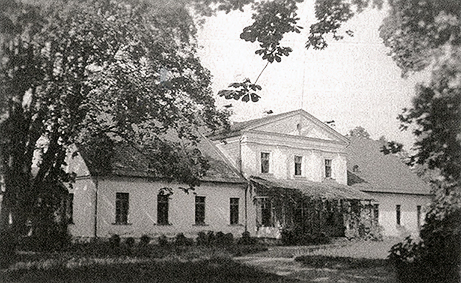
Manor (1934–1937)

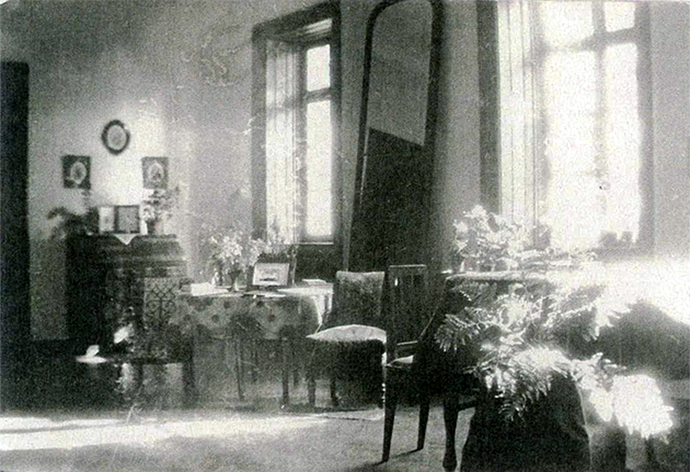
Inside (1934–1937)

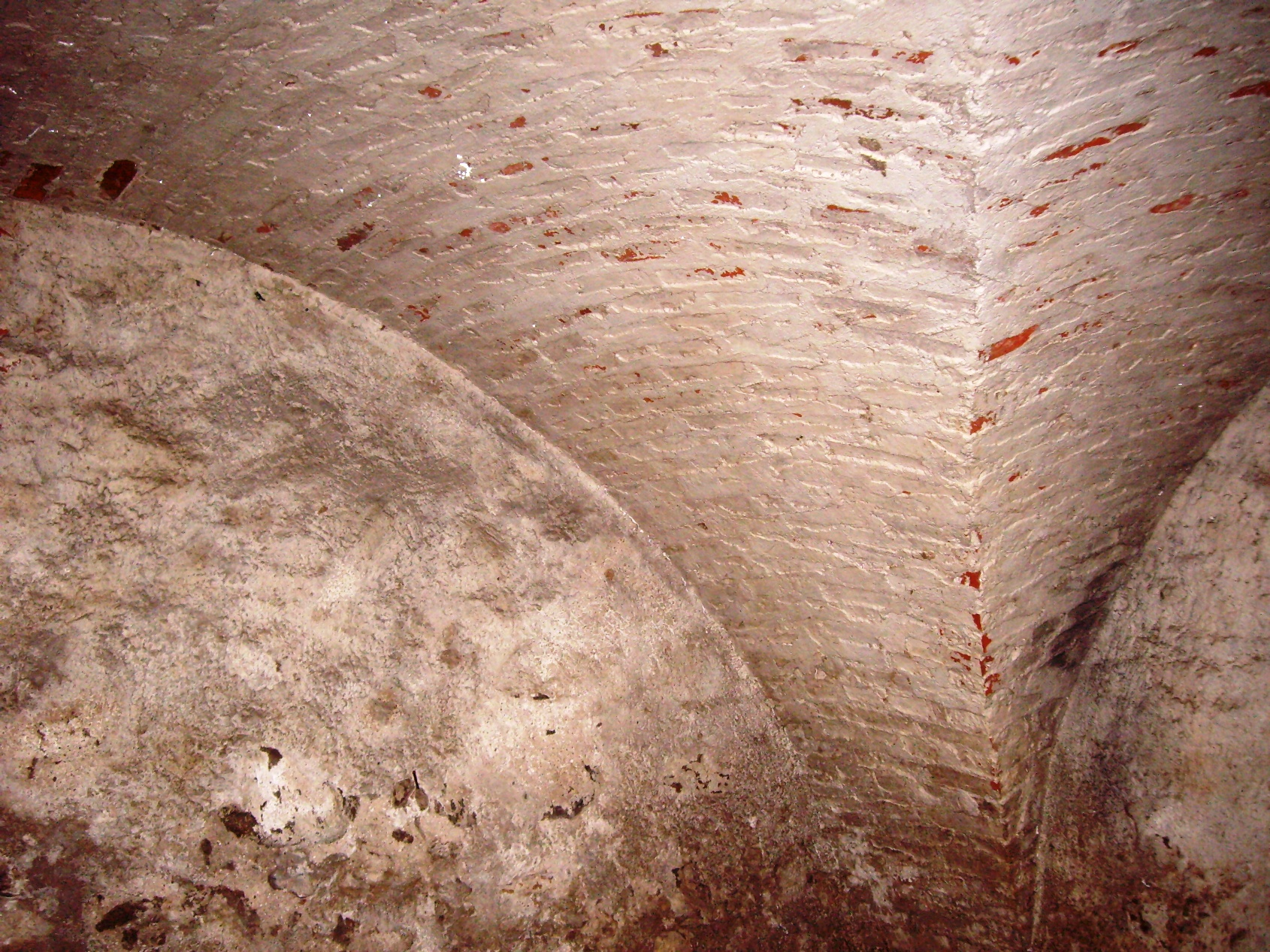
Cellar

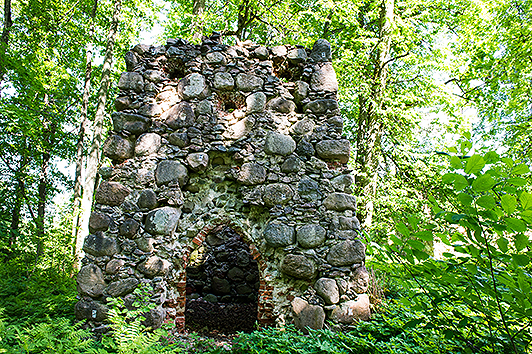
Smokehouse

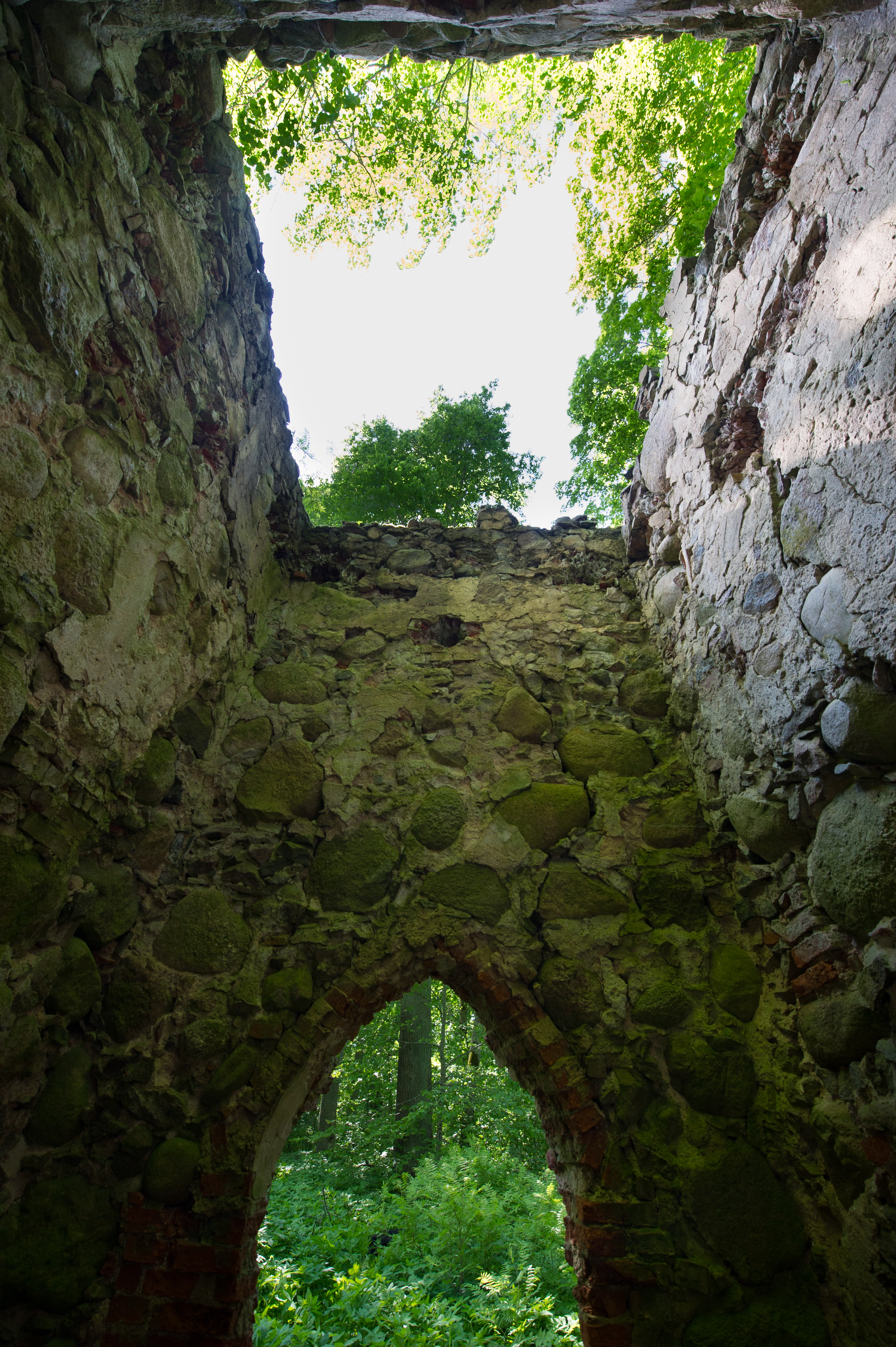
Smokehouse

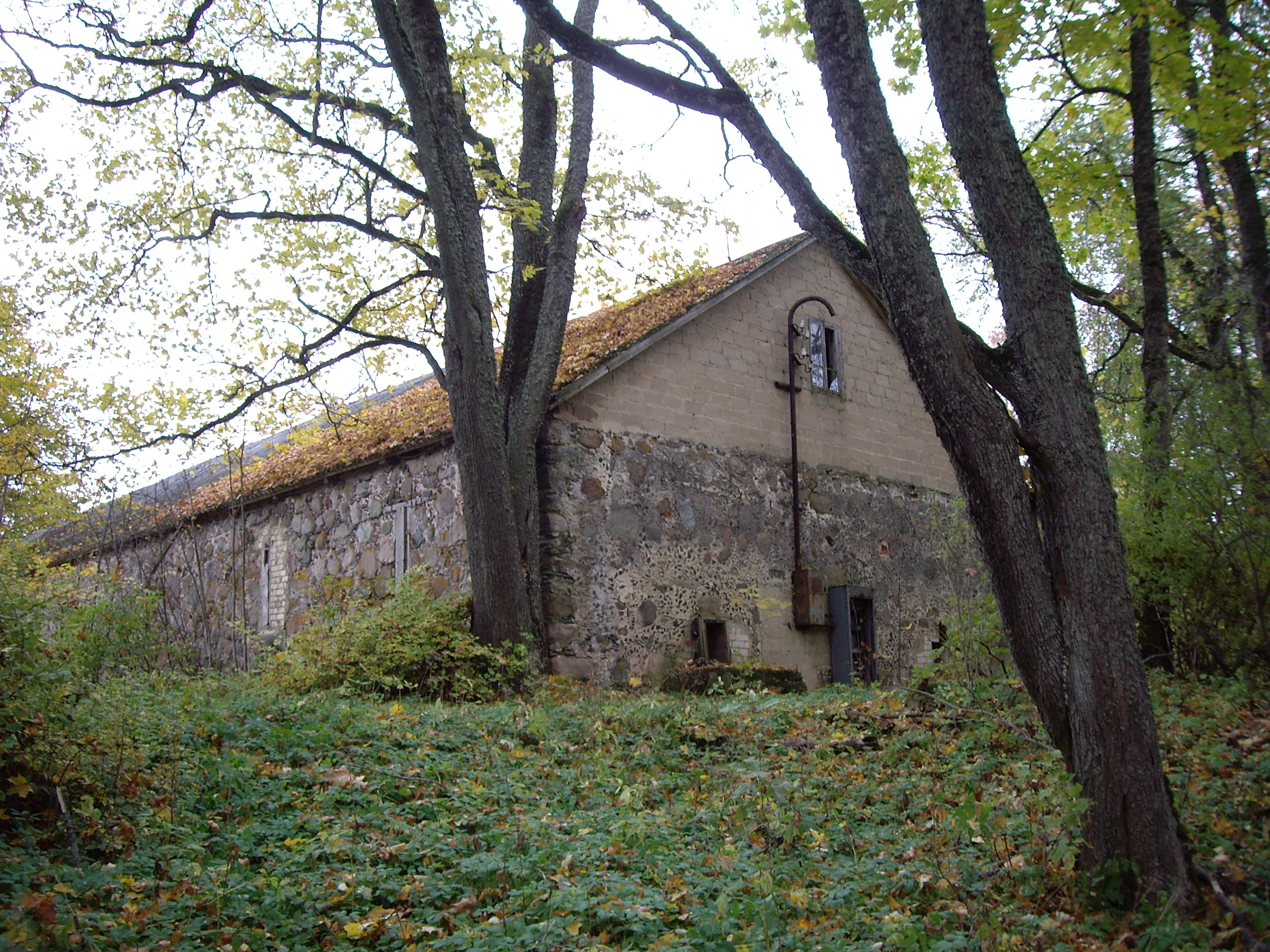
Barn

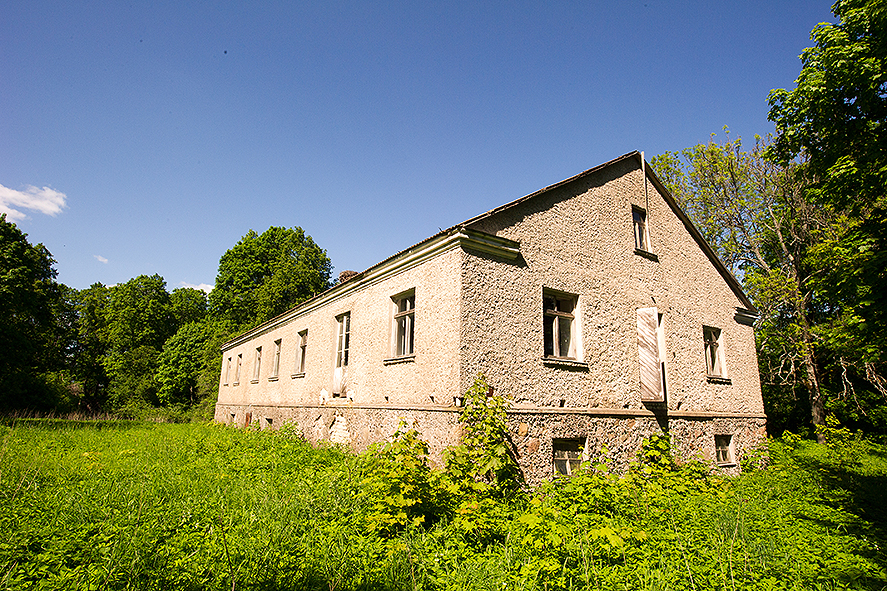
Dwelling house

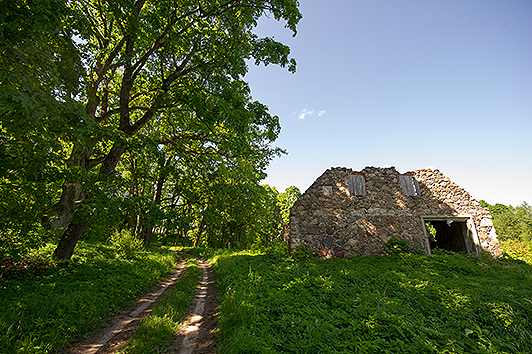
Stables

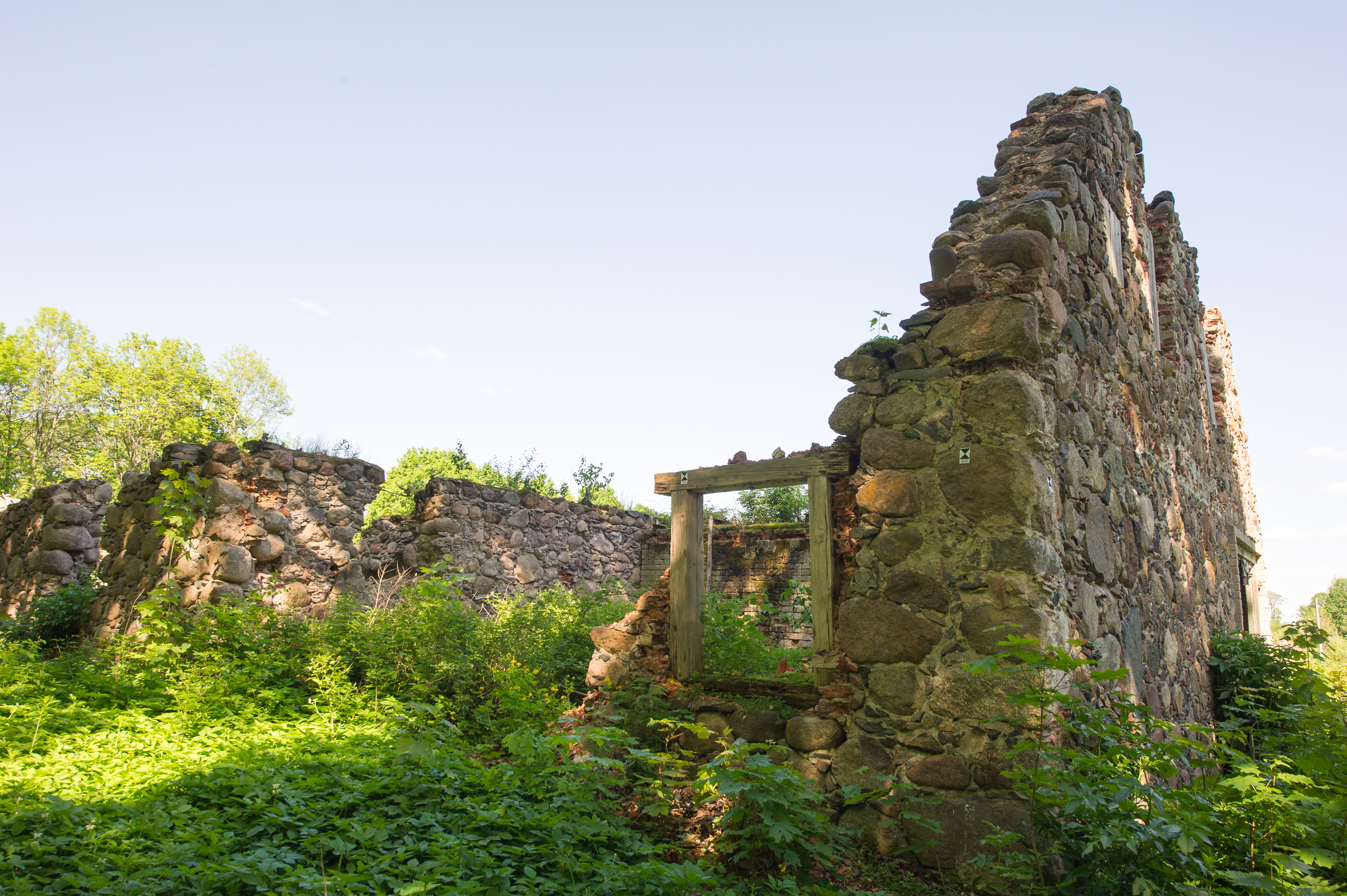
Stables

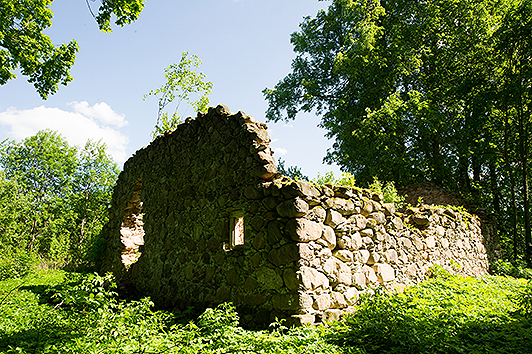
Outbuilding
