= Aizupe Manor =

Manor in Latvia

- Kurzeme, Latvia
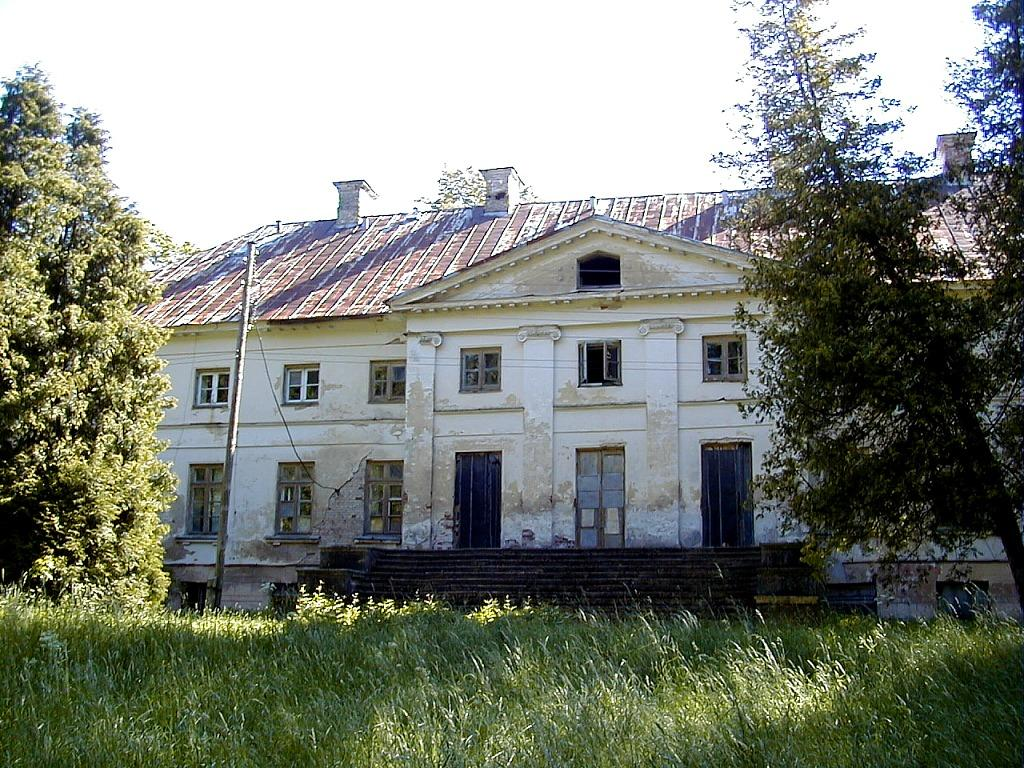

Site information
- Type: Manor

Location
- Coordinates: 56.5516°N 22.3521°E

Aizupe Manor (Latvian: Aizupes muižas pils, German: Gut Ahsuppen) is a manor house built in late classicism style in Vāne Parish, Tukums Municipality, in the Courland region of Latvia. Construction of the manor was completed in 1823. The building housed a forestry school from 1939 to 1985.

== History ==
On the basis of the Treaty of Vilnius (November 1561), the Duchy of Courland and Semigallia was created from the part of Latvia between the west bank of the Daugava River and the Baltic Sea, specifically for Gotthard Kettler of the House of Kettler. At that time, the estate of Aizupe Manor came under the control of Gotthard Kettler, Duke of Courland and Semigallia, the last master of the Order of the Brothers of the Sword. Subsequent to 1561, the Duchy remained under the rule of the House of Kettler until the male line died out with the exception of Ernst Johann Biron and his son Peter von Biron.

Shortly afterward the establishment of the Duchy, the Duke granted Aizupe Manor to his counselor, Latvian diplomat Salomon Henning (1528-1589). Henning later authored Chronicle of Livonia and Courland, including a moving account of the Siege of Cēsis Castle (1577).

In 1719, the manor became property of the heirs of Henning. It later passed to the House of Koskull (also known as von Koskul or von Koskulus). From 1725 to 1793, it was owned by the Mirabahu family (also known as the Mirbach or von Mirbahu family).

In 1795, the Courland Governorate was created from portions of the Duchy of Courland and Semigallia and incorporated into the Russian Empire. The Governor General of the newly created Courland Governorate was Peter Ludwig von der Pahlen, who was believed to be a distant relation to the Henning family. It was under the governorship of von der Pahlen that the von Hahn family became connected to Aizupe Manor, awarded to Adolph Georg Wilhelm (Adolph) von Hahn (1749-1823) and eventually becoming the property of his son, Paul Theodor von Hahn (1793–1862), who served as governor from 1824 to 1827. Paul Theodor settled into the manor after its completion as a self-sustaining agricultural entity.

The Hahn family was responsible for expanding the core of the estate into a 19th-century farmhouse complex. The manor and grounds included several residential houses, large barns with ramps, and distillery. A park established between 1830 and 1840 next to the manor house until the beginning of the 20th century. The layout and interrelated production model was completed by 1823.

The property remained in the family until 1920.

From 1939 to 1945, Aizupe Manor was occupied by the Forest School, and from the 1945 to 1985 by the Forest Technical School. Since the 1990s it has been under control of Kandava municipality, Vāne parish, Semigallia; it currently is operated as a social rehabilitation center for children.

== See also ==
- List of palaces and manor houses in Latvia
