= Vāne Manor =

Manor house in Courland, Latvia

- Zemgale, Latvia
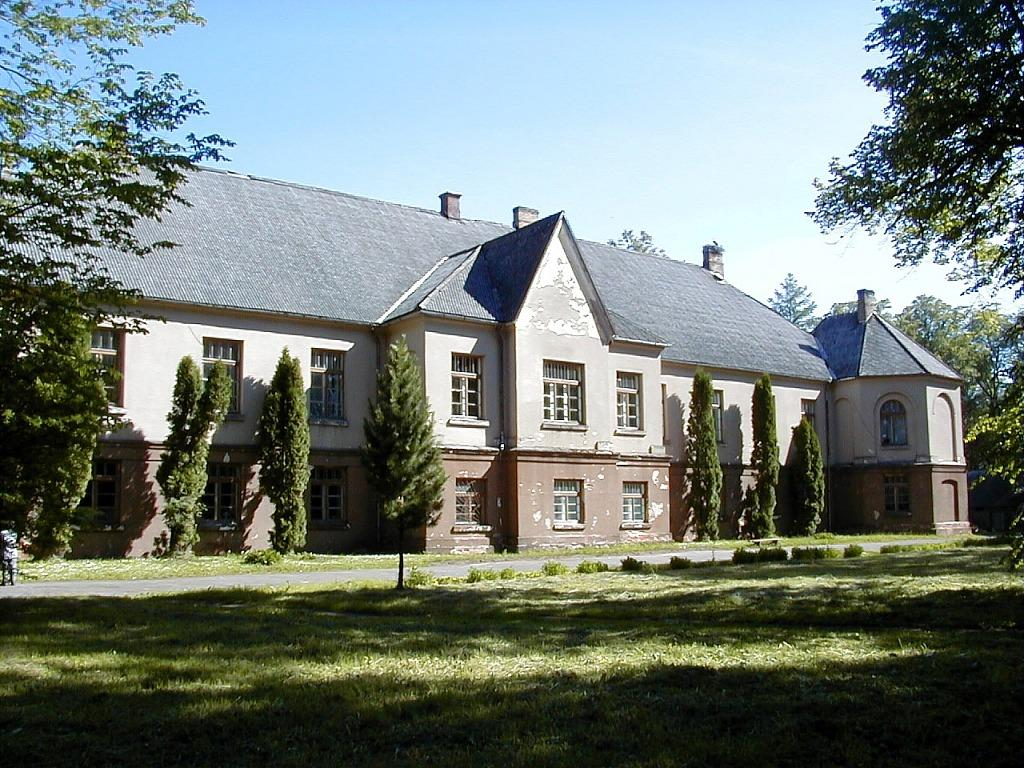

Site information
- Type: Manor

Location
- Location within Latvia
- Coordinates: 56°55′24″N 22°33′45″E

Vāne Manor (Latvian: Vānes muižas pils, German: Wahnen) is a 19th-century manor house in Vāne parish, Tukums Municipality in the Courland region of Latvia.

== History ==
Vāne estate was one of the largest properties in the area during the Baronial times, along with Aizupe. In the 16th century Livonian baron Solomon Hening (1528-1589), secretary to Gotthard Kettler, Duke of Courland, spent his last days in the Vāne manor.

The existing Manor house was built in the 1870s in a Neo-Gothic style by architect T. Seiler, The manor house suffered extensive fire damage as a result of the 1905 Russian revolution. It was restored between 1936 and 1940 for the purpose of establishing a local school. It currently accommodates Vāne primary school.

During the German occupation of Latvia, the building was used as a hospital. In 1944 one end of the building burned down. The Germans rebuilt damaged part of the building, but the interior was not restored. In 1945 the Germans were expelled and local school returned to it premises. The school was completely renovated in 1950.

== See also ==
- List of palaces and manor houses in Latvia
