= Vāne Parish =

Parish of Latvia

- parish of Latvia
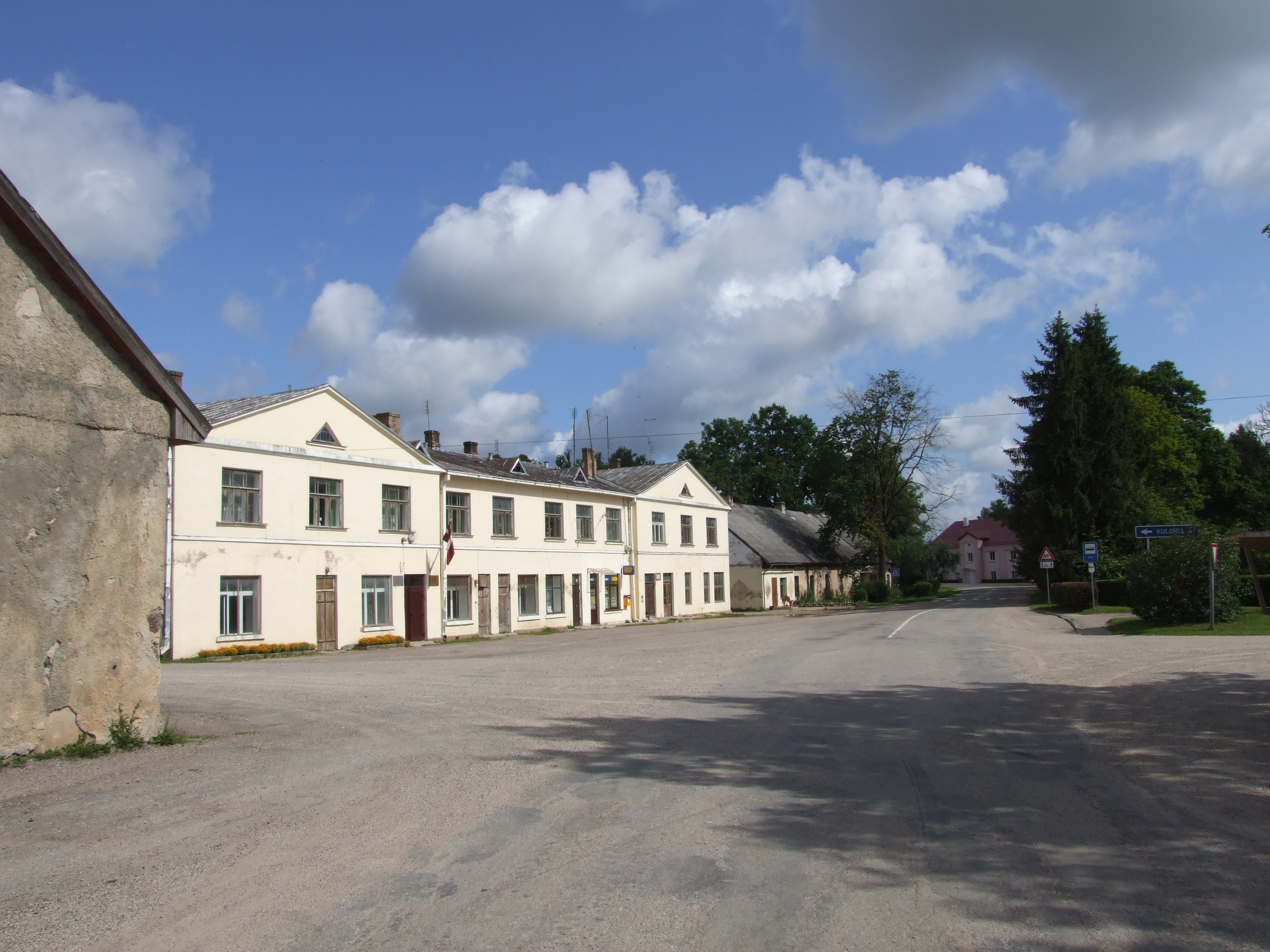
- Carrer principal de Vāne

- Coat of arms

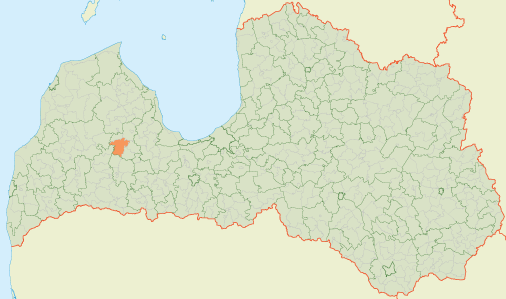
- Coordinates: 56°54′17″N 22°35′53″E
- Country: Latvia

Population (1 January 2026)
  - Total: 683

Vāne Parish (Latvian: Vānes pagasts) was an administrative territorial entity of Tukums Municipality in the Courland region of Latvia. It was part of the former Kandava Municipality from 2009 until 2021.

== History ==
In the territory of today's Vāne Parish there were historically Aizupe Manor (German: Gut Ahsuppen, Aizupe), Vāne Manor (German: Gut Wahnen, Vane), Varieb Manor (German: Gut Warriben, Varieba).

In 1935 the area of Vāne Parish was 60.2 km^{2}. In 1945 the parish councils of Vāne and Sarcene were established, but in 1949 the parish was dissolved. In 1954 the villages of Sarcene and Varieb were added to the village of Vāne and in 1973 the village of Aizupe was also added. In 1990 the village was reorganized into a parish. In 2009, the parish was included as an administrative territory in Kandava Municipality.

== Towns, villages and settlements of Vāne parish ==
- Vāne – parish administrative center

== See also ==
- Aizupe Manor
