= Siege of Cēsis Castle (1577) =

Russian siege

The siege of Cēsis Castle (1577) was a part of Ivan the Terrible's campaign to conquer Old Livonia. After a five-day-long bombardment, about 300 people within the castle committed mass suicide by blowing themselves up with four barrels of gunpowder. The event is regarded as one of the greatest tragedies in the war-torn Europe of the early modern period.

== Background ==
After the dissolution of the Livonian branch of the Teutonic Order in 1561, Cēsis Castle, one of the region's most important fortresses, was garrisoned by Polish troops. In the summer of 1577, the townsmen of Cēsis drove the Polish garrison from the castle and submitted to Magnus, the titular King of Livonia. Soon after Magnus have moved to Cēsis the Muscovites, personally led by Ivan the Terrible, arrived at the edge of the town. The tsar had a reputation for not sparing even those who willingly surrendered, and therefore the decision was made not to open the gates. According to Salomon Henning the bombardment of the castle was ordered to be opened with full force when a shot came flying from the castle and whizzed right by the tsar's head.

== Siege and explosion ==
The Muscovites were thousands strong, armed with heavy artillery, while the castle was occupied by a few hundred people, according to Laurentius Müller, mostly women and children. They had sought safety and protection inside the castle, knowing of the Muscovite ruler's pathological cruelty towards captives. Salomon Henning wrote that abject despair and utter hopelessness arose among the defenders of the castle:

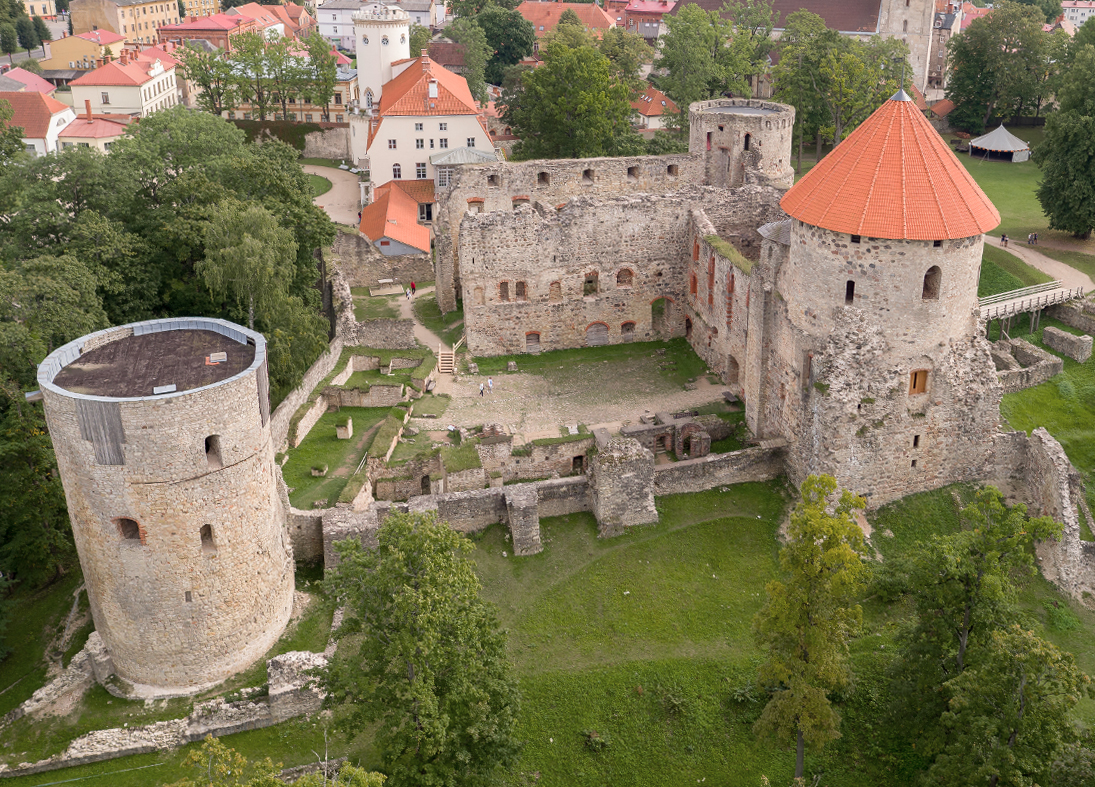
Both northern and western ranges of Cēsis Castle were almost razed to the ground by artillery bombardment during the Livonian War.

Whenever someone, standing in a window for example, was struck and killed by a shot from the heavy artillery, another would take his place as soon as he had been dragged away, hoping to meet his own end in the same fashion.

The castle was severely damaged by the five-days-long shelling – cracks and holes in the thick walls grew larger and larger. Cēsis Castle was doomed but people who had sought shelter behind its walls were ready to do anything to avoid being taken prisoners by the ruthless invaders. Thus they decided to take an extreme measure: to blow themselves up with gunpowder.

Documentary and archaeological evidence point out that the first-floor hall of the western range was chosen as the location for the suicide.

Salomon Henning's Chronicle of Livonia and Courland gives the most touching description of the mass suicide:

One should have seen this sorrow beyond all sorrow as the good people knelt in the room beneath which the gunpowder had been placed. Man and wife held each others' hands, children gathered around their parents, some still nursing at their mothers' breasts, all awaiting blessed St. Simeon's hour. Nor, as the Muscovite soon hereafter began to storm and invade the castle, was it long delayed. The gunpowder was ignited and all were blown up, aside from those who had hidden elsewhere in the castle...
