= Albania =

Country in Southeastern Europe

Republic of Albania Republika e Shqipërisë
- Flag Coat of arms
- Motto: Ti Shqipëri, më jep nder, më jep emrin Shqipëtar "You Albania, you give me honour, you give me the name Albanian"
- Anthem: "Himni i Flamurit" "Hymn to the Flag"
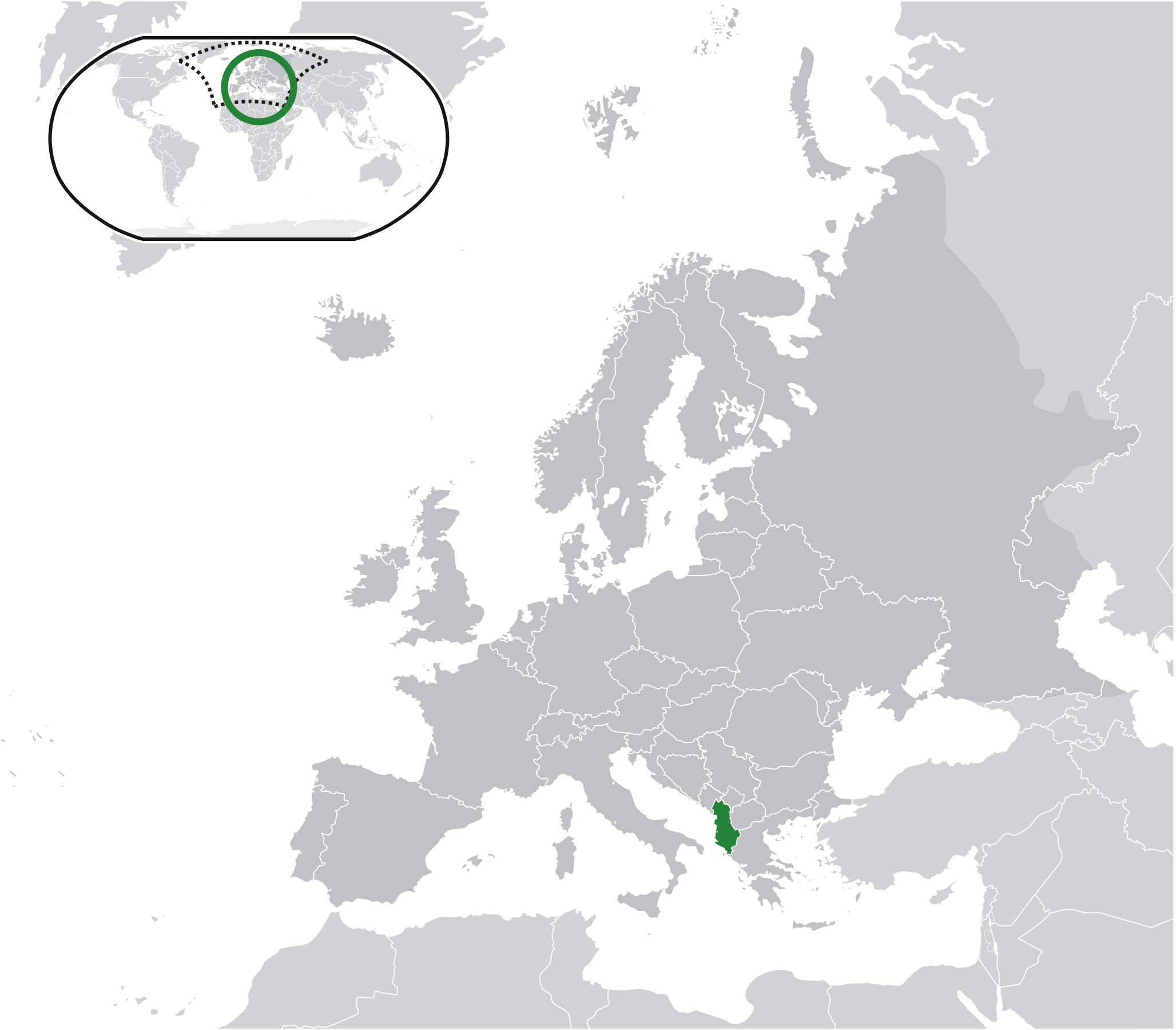
- Location of Albania (green) in Europe (dark grey)
- Capital and largest city: Tirana; 41°19′N 19°49′E
- Official languages: Albanian
- Recognised minority languages: Greek; Aromanian; Macedonian
- Ethnic groups (2023) (Note: Excluding population for which data is not available.): 96.44% Albanians; 1.04% Greeks; 0.55% Egyptians; 1.33% Others; 0.65% Undeclared (Note: Includes both the option "Prefer not to answer" (0.6%) and the option "None" (0.05%).)
- Religion (2023): 50.67% Islam; 45.86% Sunni; 4.81% Bektashism; 16.02% Christianity; 8.39% Catholicism; 7.23% Orthodoxy; 0.40% Protestantism; 17.37% Irreligion; 13.83% Believers without religion; 3.55% Atheism; 15.92% Undeclared
- Demonym: Albanian
- Government: Unitary parliamentary republic
  - President: Bajram Begaj
  - Prime Minister: Edi Rama
  - Parliament Speaker: Niko Peleshi
- Legislature: Kuvendi

Establishment history
  - Principality of Arbanon: 1190
  - Albanian principalities: 12th–15th centuries
  - Kingdom of Albania: February 1272
  - Principality of Albania: 1359
  - League of Lezhë: 2 March 1444
  - Pashalik of Scutari/Janina/Berat: 1757/1787
  - League of Prizren: 10 June 1878
  - Independent Albania: 28 November 1912
  - Principality of Albania: 29 July 1913
  - 1st Republic of Albania: 31 January 1925
  - Kingdom of Albania: 1 September 1928
  - 2nd Republic of Albania: 10 January 1946
  - 3rd Republic of Albania: 28 December 1976
  - 4th Republic of Albania: 29 April 1991
  - Current constitution: 28 November 1998

Area
  - Total: 28,748 km^{2} (11,100 sq mi) (140th)
  - Water (%): 4.7

Population
  - 2026 census: ▼2,335,930 (143rd)
  - Density: 81.3/km^{2} (210.6/sq mi)
- GDP (PPP): 2026 estimate
  - Total: ▲$67.610 billion (118th)
  - Per capita: ▲$28,820 (76th)
- GDP (nominal): 2026 estimate
  - Total: ▲$32.770 billion (114th)
  - Per capita: ▲$13,970 (75th)
- Gini (2021): ▼29.4 low inequality
- HDI (2023): ▲0.810 very high (71st)
- Currency: Lek (ALL)
- Time zone: UTC+1 (CET)
  - Summer (DST): UTC+2 (CEST)
- Calling code: +355
- ISO 3166 code: AL
- Internet TLD: .al

Albania, (Note: /ælˈbeɪniə, ɔːl-/ a(w)l-BAY-nee-ə; Albanian: Shqipëri or Shqipëria), pronounced [ʃcipəˈɾi(a)]; Gheg Albanian: Shqipni or Gheg Albanian: Shqipnia, also Gheg Albanian: Shqypni or Gheg Albanian: Shqypnia.) officially the Republic of Albania, (Note: Albanian: Republika e Shqipërisë, pronounced [ɾɛpuˈblika ɛ ʃcipəˈɾisə]) is a country in Southeastern Europe. It is located in the Balkans, on the Adriatic and Ionian Seas within the Mediterranean Sea, and shares land borders with Montenegro to the northwest, Kosovo to the northeast, North Macedonia to the east and Greece to the south. With an area of 28,748 km^{2} (11,100 sq mi), it has a varied range of climatic, geological, hydrological and morphological conditions. Landscapes range from rugged snow-capped mountains in the Albanian Alps and the Korab, Skanderbeg, Pindus and Ceraunian Mountains, to fertile lowland plains extending from the Adriatic and Ionian sea coasts. Tirana is the capital and largest city, followed by Durrës, Vlorë, and Shkodër.

Albania was inhabited by several Illyrian tribes, among them the Ardiaei, Bylliones, Dassaretii, Enchele, and Taulantians, with the Chaonians settled in the southwest. Several colonies were founded by the Ancient Greeks along the Albanian coast, most notably Apollonia. The Illyrians were the dominant power before the rise of Macedon. Following the Illyrian Wars, Albania was integrated into the Roman Empire and remained in the Byzantine Empire after its partition. During the Middle Ages, several Albanian principalities emerged, most notably the Principality of Arbanon, Kingdom of Albania, Principality of Albania and Albania Veneta. In the 15th century, Albania became a center of resistance against Ottoman expansion under the leadership of Gjergj Kastrioti Skanderbeg, whose military campaigns repelled Ottoman advances for over two decades. Although incorporated into the Ottoman Empire, Albania retained distinct cultural and social identities throughout four centuries of foreign rule, culminating in the Albanian Renaissance in the 19th century. Albania declared independence in 1912, followed by a turbulent 20th century marked by monarchy, foreign occupation during both World Wars, and a communist regime under Enver Hoxha.

Since its independence in 1912, Albania has undergone many political changes, transitioning from a monarchy to a communist regime before becoming a sovereign parliamentary constitutional republic. Governed by a constitution prioritising the separation of powers, the political structure includes a parliament, a ceremonial president, a functional prime minister and a hierarchy of courts. Albania is a developing country with an upper-middle income economy driven by the service sector, with manufacturing and tourism—which attracted over 11 million visitors in 2024—playing significant roles. The illegal drug trade in Albania contributes around US$100 million to the economy per year. After the dissolution of its communist system, the country shifted from centralised planning to an open market economy. Citizens have universal health care access and free primary and secondary education. The country is an official candidate for membership in the European Union and has been negotiating accession since 2022.

== Etymology ==
The origin of the name "Albania" can be traced back to medieval Latin and the association with the Illyrian tribe of the Albani. This connection is further supported by the writings of Ancient Greek geographer Ptolemy during the 2nd century AD, where he included the settlement of Albanopolis situated to the northeast of Durrës. The presence of a medieval settlement named Albanon or Arbanon hints at the possibility of historical continuity. The relationship between these historical references and the question of whether Albanopolis was synonymous with Albanon remain subjects of scholarly debate.

Byzantine historian Michael Attaleiates, in his 11th-century historical account, provides the earliest undisputed reference to the Albanians, when he mentions them as participants in a revolt against Constantinople in 1079. He also identifies the Arbanitai as subjects of the Duke of Dyrrachium. In the Middle Ages, Albania was denoted as Arbëri or Arbëni by its inhabitants, who identified themselves as Arbëreshë or Arbëneshë.

Albanians employ the terms Shqipëri or Shqipëria for their nation, designations that trace their historical origins to the 14th century. But only in the late 17th and early 18th centuries did these terms gradually supersede Arbëria and Arbëreshë among Albanians. These two expressions are widely interpreted to symbolise "Children of the Eagles" and "Land of the Eagles".

== History ==
=== Prehistory ===
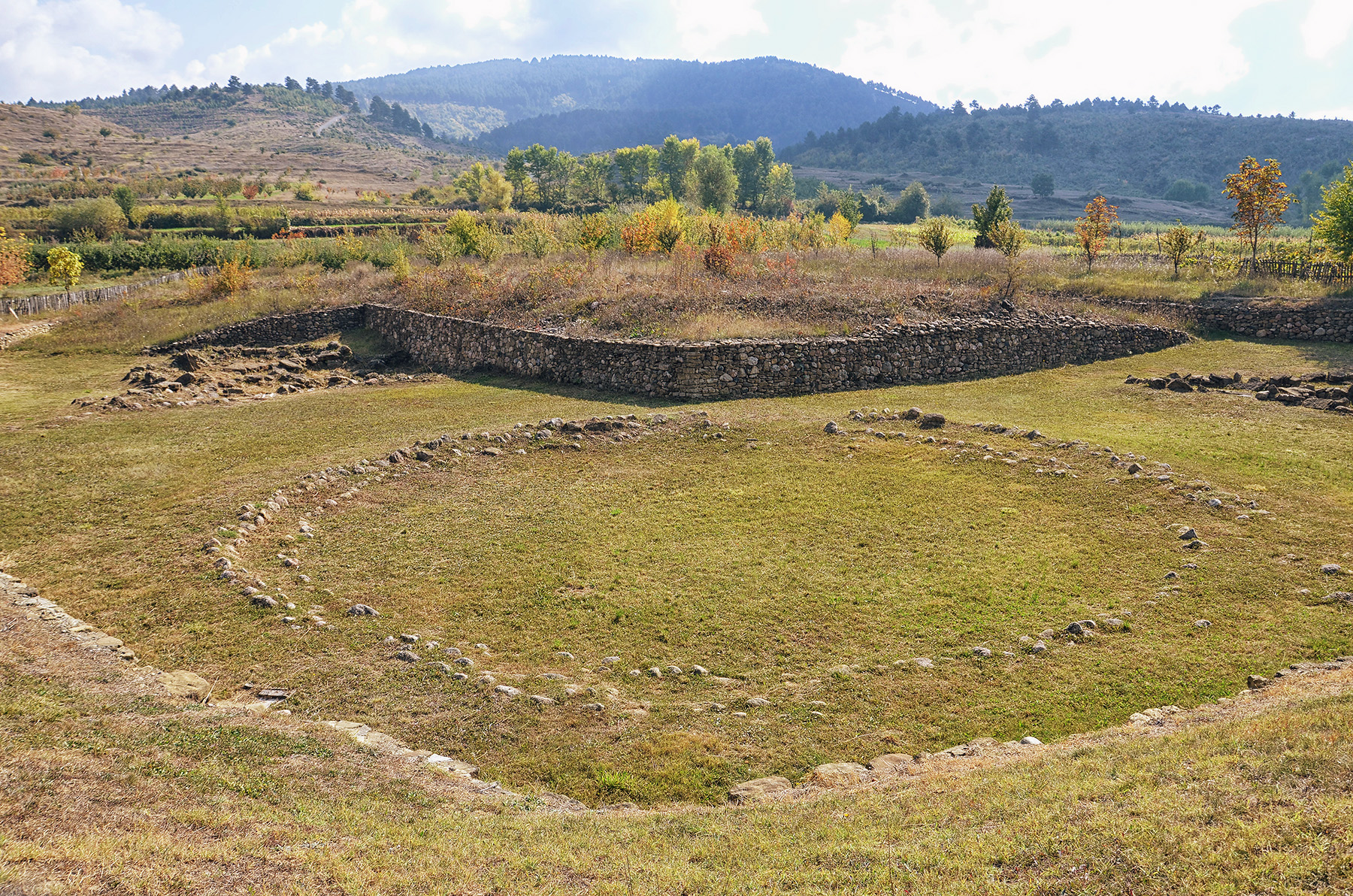
The remains of the Kamenica Tumulus in the county of Korçë

Mesolithic habitation in Albania has been evidenced in several open-air sites which were close to the Adriatic coastline and in caves. Mesolithic objects found in a cave near Xarrë include flint and jasper objects along with fossilised animal bones, while discoveries at Mount Dajti comprise bone and stone tools similar to those of the Aurignacian culture. The Neolithic era began around 7000 BC and is evidenced in finds which indicate domestication of sheep and goats and small-scale agriculture. A part of the Neolithic population may have been the same as the Mesolithic population of the southern Balkans, like in the Konispol cave, where the Mesolithic stratum co-exists with Pre-Pottery Neolithic finds. Cardium pottery culture appears in coastal Albania and across the Adriatic after 6500 BC, while the settlements of the interior took part in the processes that formed the Starčevo culture. The bitumen mines of Selenicë provide early evidence of bitumen exploitation in Europe, dating to Late Neolithic (from 5000 BC), when local communities used it as pigment for ceramic decoration, waterproofing, and adhesive for repairing broken vessels. The bitumen of Selenicë circulated towards eastward from the early 5th millennium BC. First evidence of its overseas trade export comes from the Neolithic and Bronze Age southern Italy. The high-quality bitumen of Selenicë has been exploited throughout all the historical ages since the Late Neolithic era until today.

Indo-European migrations in the western Balkans began after 2800 BC. The presence of Early Bronze Age tumuli in the vicinity of Apollonia dates to 2679±174 calBC (2852–2505 calBC). These burial mounds belong to the southern expression of the Adriatic-Ljubljana culture (related to the later Cetina culture), which moved southwards along the Adriatic from the northern Balkans. The same community built similar mounds in Rakića Kuće, Montenegro and Shtoj, Albania. The first archaeogenetic find related to Indo-Europeans involves a man with predominantly Yamnaya ancestry buried in a tumulus of northeastern Albania, which dates to 2663–2472 calBC. During the Middle Bronze Age, Cetina culture sites and finds appear in Albania. Cetina culture moved southwards across the Adriatic from the Cetina valley of Dalmatia. Cetina finds are concentrated around southern Lake Shkodër and appear typically in tumulus cemeteries, such as in Shkrel and Shtoj, and hillforts like Gajtan (Shkodër), as well as cave sites like Blaz, Nezir, and Keputa (central Albania) and lake basin sites like Sovjan (southeastern Albania).

=== Antiquity ===
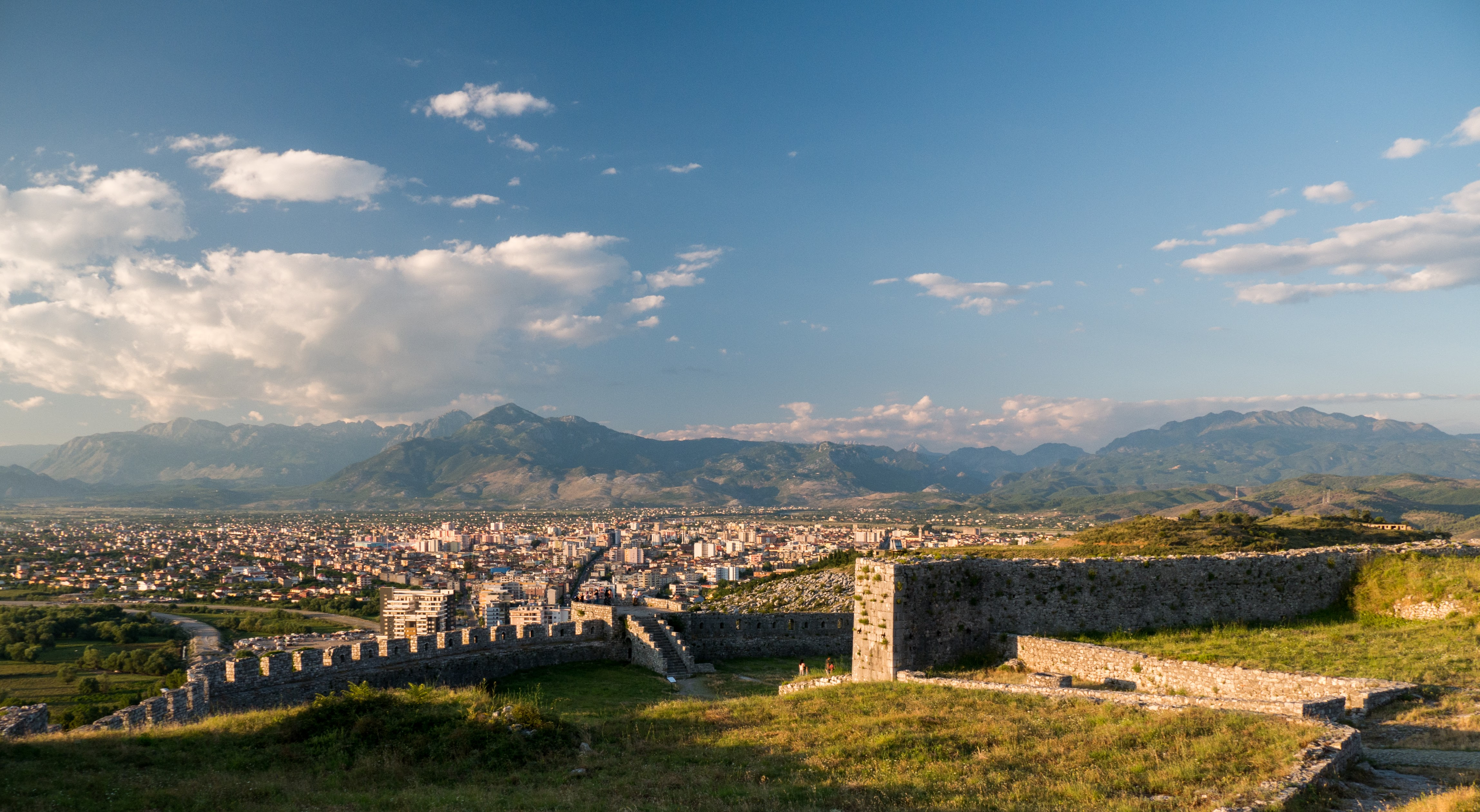
Founded in the 4th century BC, the city of Scodra was the capital of the Illyrian kingdom of Ardiaei and Labeatae.

The territory was historically inhabited by Indo-European peoples, amongst them numerous Illyrian and Epirote tribes. There were also several Greek colonies. The territory referred to as Illyria corresponded roughly to the area east of the Adriatic Sea in the Mediterranean Sea, extending in the south to the mouth of the Vjosë. The first account of the Illyrian groups comes from the Periplus of the Euxine Sea, a Greek text written in the 4th century BC. The Bryges were also present in central Albania, while the south was inhabited by the Epirote Chaonians, whose capital was at Phoenice. Other colonies, such as Apollonia and Epidamnos, were established by Greek city-states on the coast by the 7th century BC.

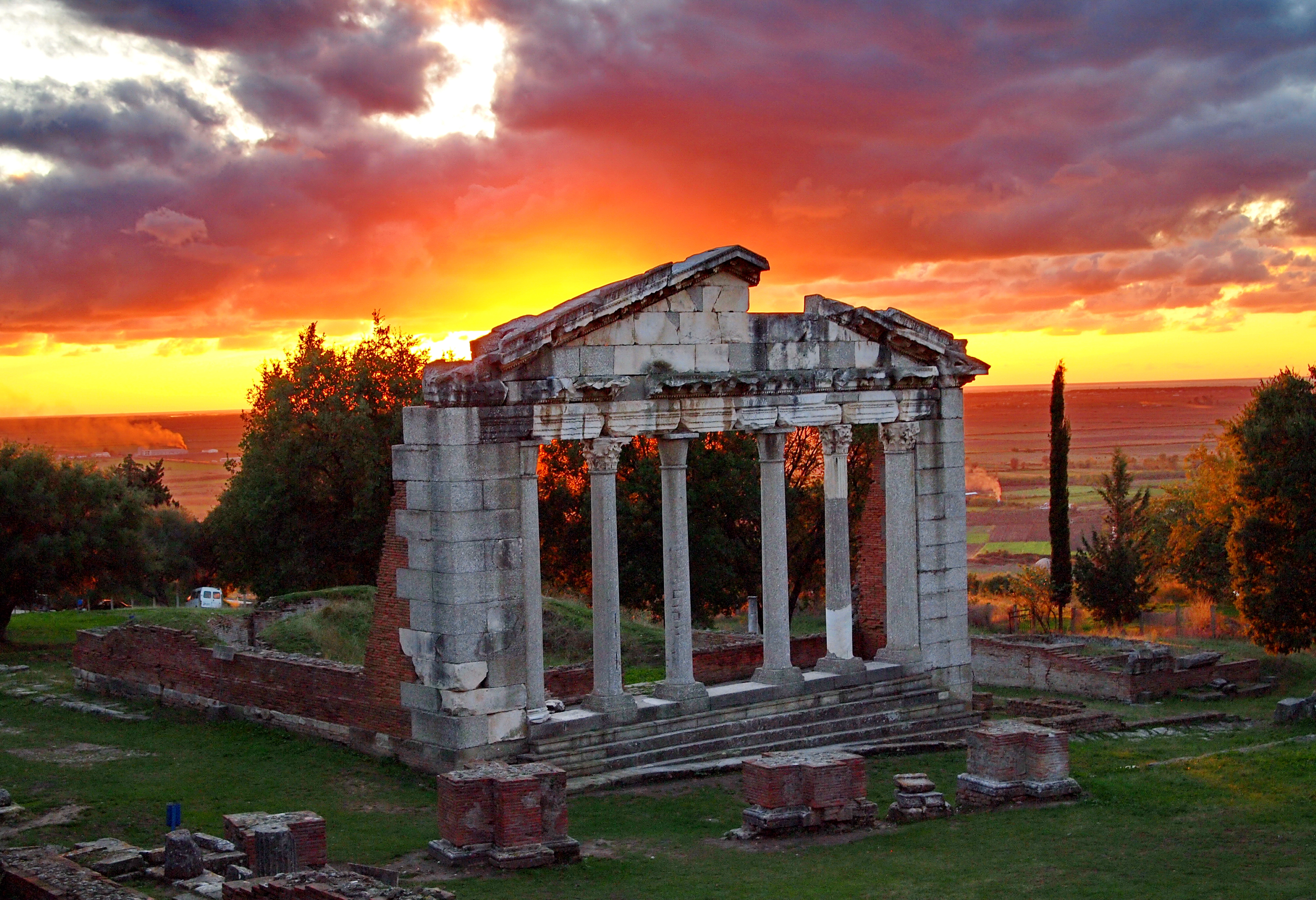
Apollonia was an important Greek colony on the Illyrian coast along the Adriatic Sea and one of the western points of the Via Egnatia route, which connected Rome and Constantinople.

The Illyrian Taulanti were a powerful Illyrian tribe among the earliest recorded tribes in the area. Taulanti ruler Glaucias and Dardanian ruler Cleitus fought against Alexander the Great at the Battle of Pelium in 335 BC. Cassander of Macedon, captured Apollonia and crossed the river Genusus (Albanian: Shkumbin) in 314 BC. A few years later, Glaucias laid siege to Apollonia and captured the Greek colony of Epidamnos.

The Illyrian Ardiaei tribe, centred in Montenegro, ruled over most of the territory of northern Albania. Their kingdom reached its greatest extent under King Agron, the son of Pleuratus II. Agron extended his rule over other neighbouring tribes as well. Following Agron's death in 230 BC, his wife, Teuta, inherited the kingdom. Teuta's forces extended their operations further southwards to the Ionian Sea. In 229 BC, Rome declared war on the kingdom for extensively plundering Roman ships. The war ended in an Illyrian defeat in 227 BC. Teuta was succeeded by Gentius in 181 BC. Gentius clashed with the Romans in 168 BC, initiating the Third Illyrian War. The conflict resulted in the Roman conquest of the region by 167 BC. The Romans split the region into three administrative divisions.

=== Middle Ages ===
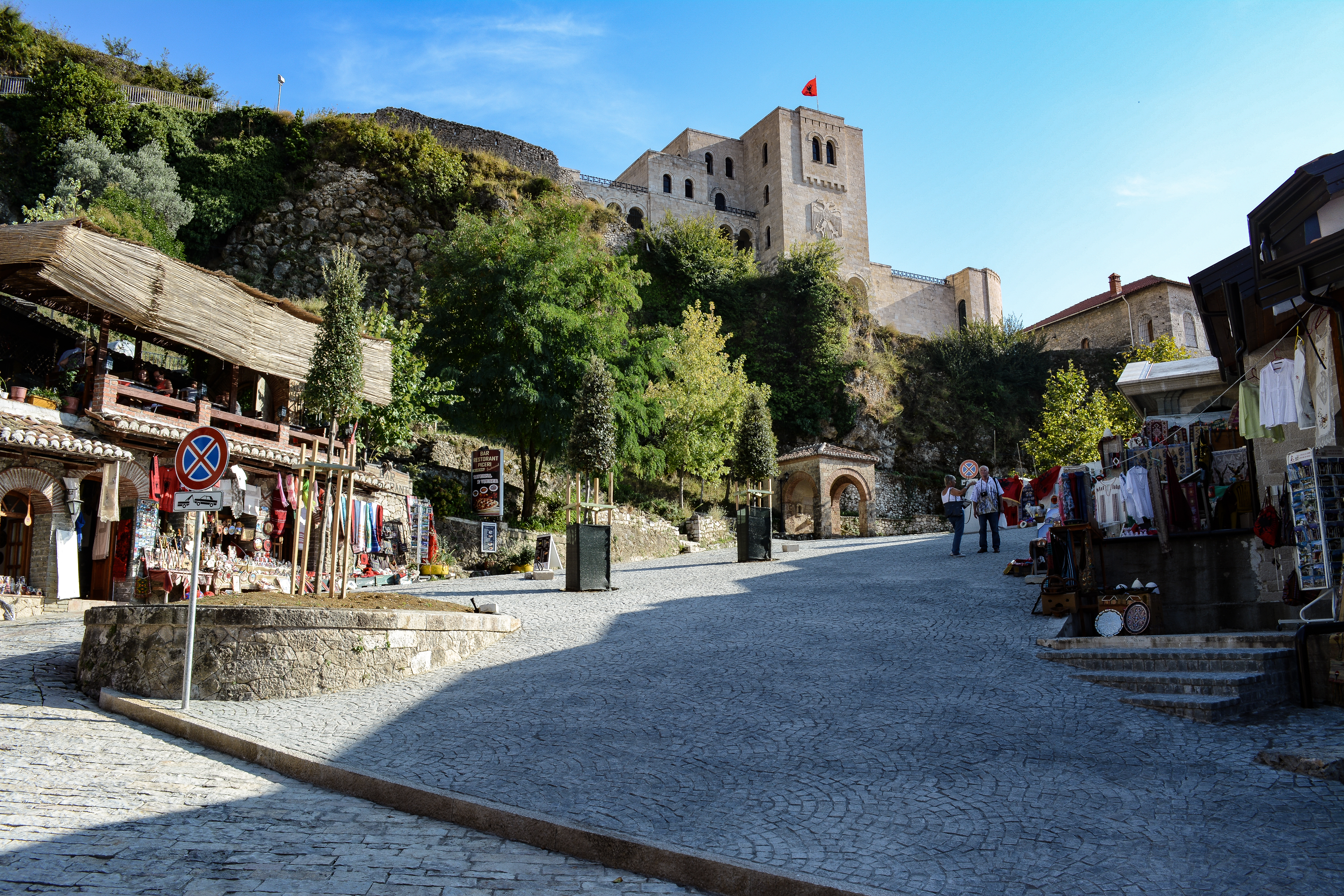
The town of Krujë was the capital of the Principality of Arbanon in the Middle Ages.

The Roman Empire was split in 395 upon the death of Theodosius I into an Eastern and Western Roman Empire, in part because of the increasing pressure from threats during the Barbarian Invasions. From the 6th century into the 7th century, the Slavs crossed the Danube and largely absorbed the indigenous Greeks, Illyrians, and Thracians in the Balkans; thus, the Illyrians were mentioned for the last time in historical records in the 7th century.

In the 11th century, the Great Schism formalised the break of communion between the Eastern Orthodox and Western Catholic Church, which is reflected in Albania through the emergence of a Catholic north and Orthodox south. The Albanian people inhabited the west of Lake Ochrida and the upper valley of the River Shkumbin and established the Principality of Arbanon in 1190 under the leadership of Progon of Kruja. The realm was succeeded by his sons Gjin Progoni and Demetrio Progoni.

Upon the death of Dhimiter, the territory came under the rule of the Albanian-Greek Gregorios Kamonas and subsequently under the Golem of Kruja. In the 13th century, the principality was dissolved. Arbanon is considered to be the first sketch of an Albanian state, which retained a semi-autonomous status as the western extremity of the Byzantine Empire, under the Byzantine Doukai of Epirus or Laskarids of Nicaea.

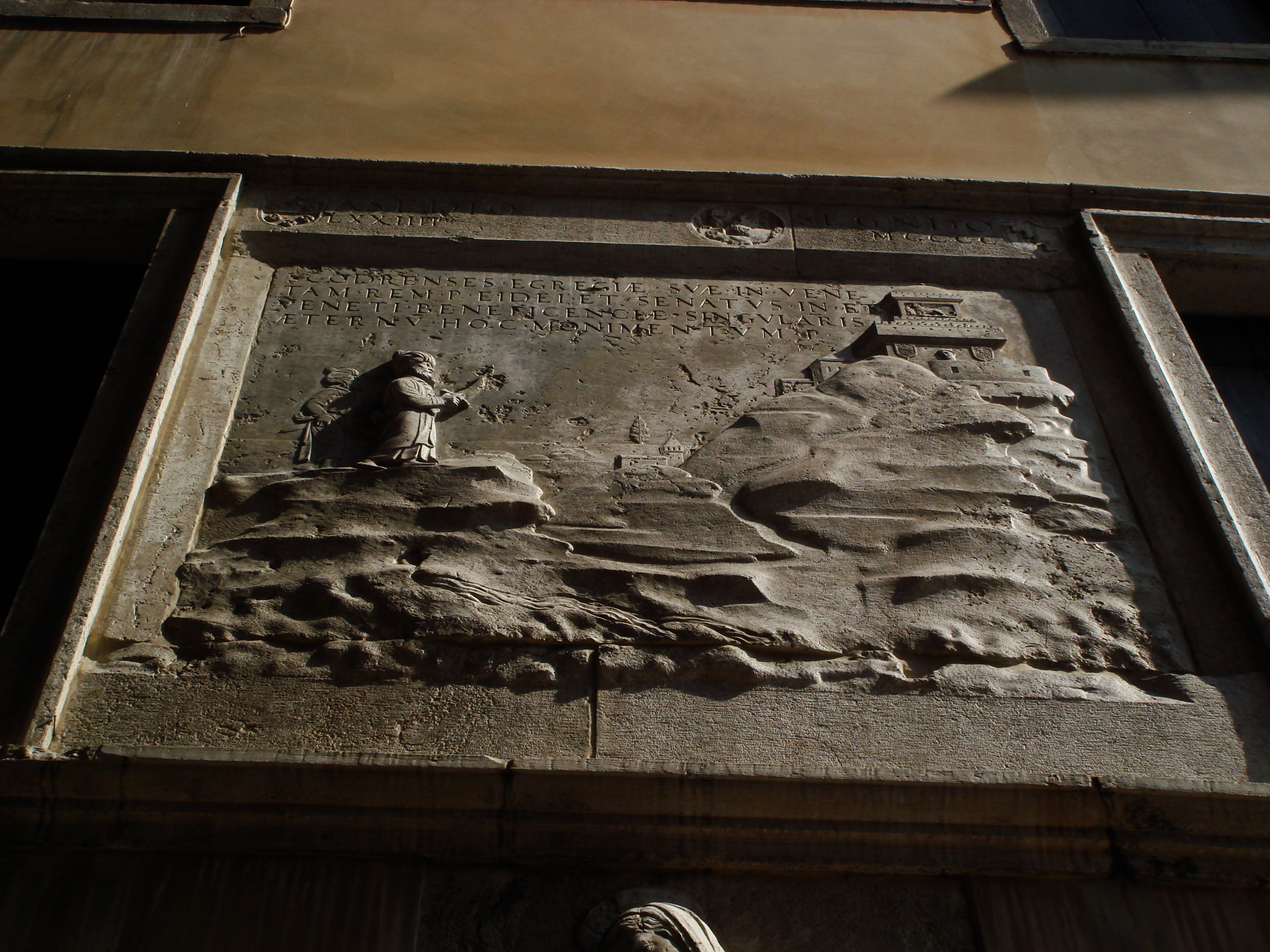
A relief of the Scuola degli Albanesi commemorating the siege of Shkodra. It illustrates Sultan Mehmet II laying siege to the Albanian town of Scutari, then part of the Venetian Empire.

Towards the end of the 12th and beginning of the 13th centuries, Serbs and Venetians began to take possession of the territory. The ethnogenesis of the Albanians is uncertain; however, the first undisputed mention of Albanians dates back in historical records from 1079 or 1080 in a work by Michael Attaleiates, who referred to the Albanoi as having taken part in a revolt against Constantinople. At this point, the Albanians were fully Christianised.

After the dissolution of Arbanon, Charles I of Anjou concluded an agreement with the Albanian rulers, promising to protect them and their ancient liberties. In 1272, he established the Kingdom of Albania and conquered regions back from the Despotate of Epirus. The kingdom claimed all of central Albania territory from Dyrrhachium along the Adriatic Sea coast down to Butrint. A Catholic political structure was a basis for the papal plans of spreading Catholicism in the Balkans. This plan also found the support of Helen of Anjou. Around 30 Catholic churches and monasteries were built during her rule, mainly in northern Albania. Internal power struggles within the Byzantine Empire in the 14th century enabled Serbs' most powerful medieval ruler, Stefan Dušan, to establish a short-lived empire that included all of Albania except Durrës.

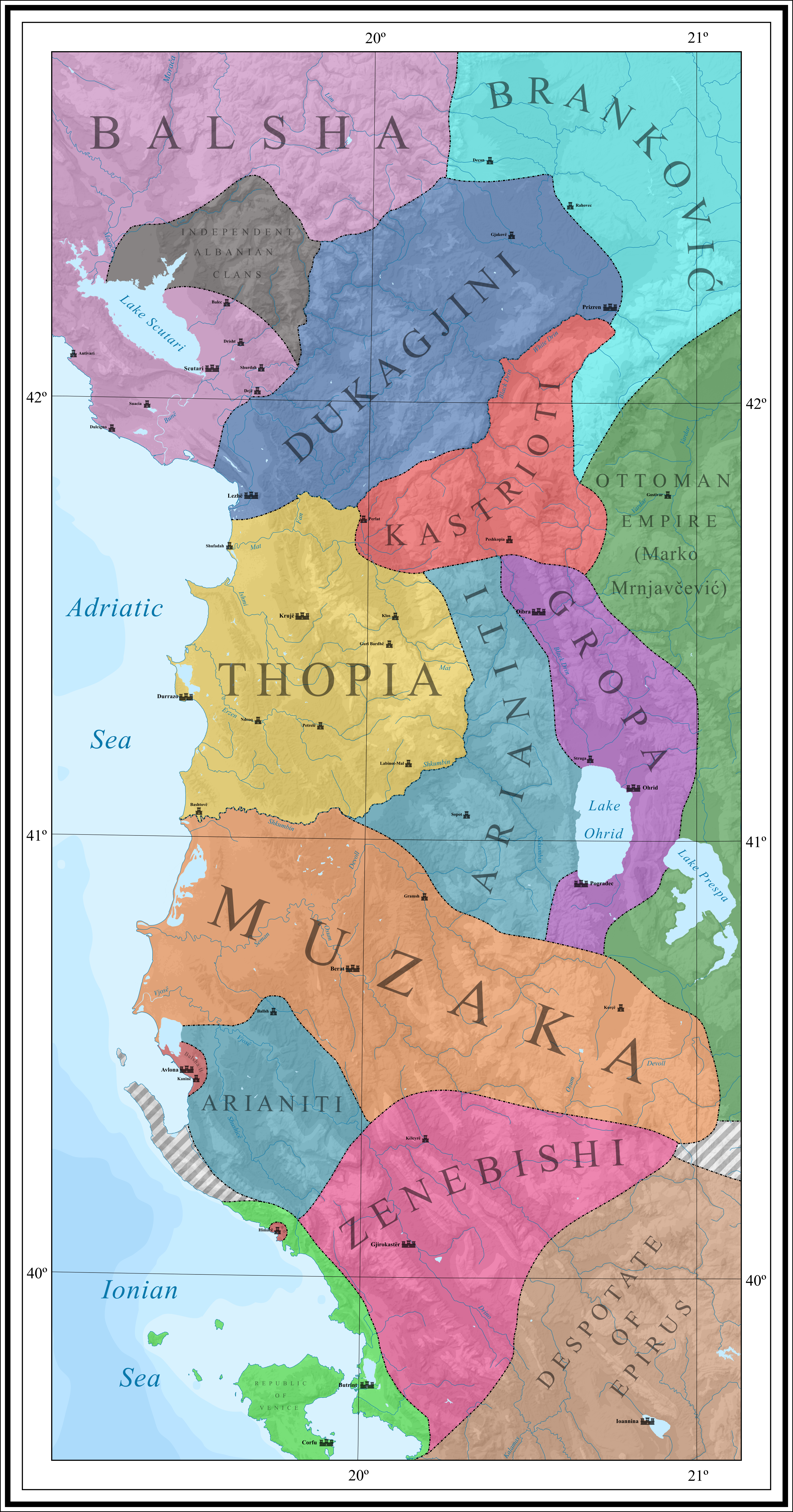
Albanian principalities, c. 1390, excluding the Despotate of Arta

In 1367, Albanian rulers established the Despotate of Arta. During that time, several Albanian principalities were established, notably the Principality of Albania, the Principality of Kastrioti, the Lordship of Berat, and the Principality of Dukagjini. In the first half of the 15th century, the Ottoman Empire invaded most of Albania, and the League of Lezhë was organized under Skanderbeg as a ruler, who became the national hero of the Albanian medieval history.

==== Ottoman Empire ====
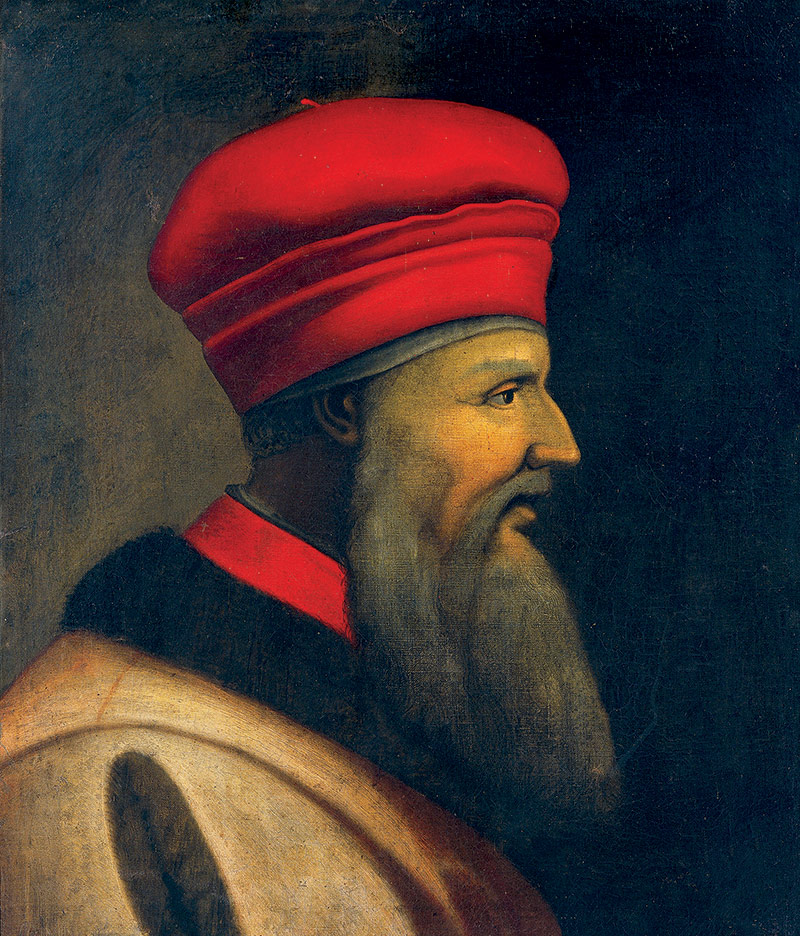
After serving the Ottoman Empire for nearly 20 years, Gjergj Kastrioti Skanderbeg deserted and began a successful rebellion against the empire that halted Ottoman advance into Europe for 25 years.

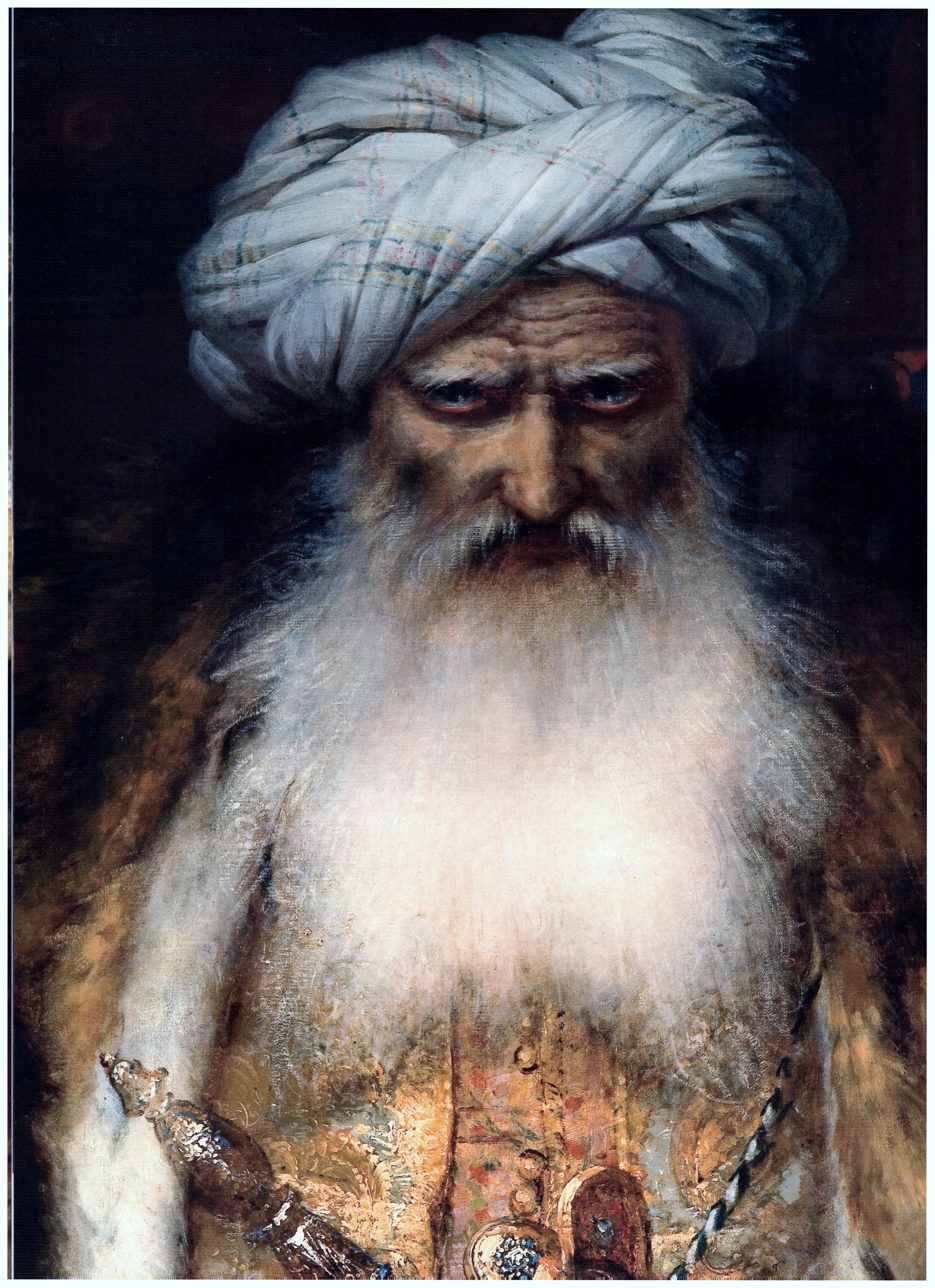
Ali Pasha Tepelena was a powerful autonomous Ottoman-Albanian ruler, governing over the Pashalik of Yanina.

With the fall of Constantinople, the Ottoman Empire entered an extended period of military conquest and expansion, with its borders gradually expanding deep into Southeast Europe. In 1385, they reached the Albanian Ionian Sea Coast, while in 1415, they established their garrisons across Southern Albania, eventually occupying most of Albania in 1431. Thousands of Albanians consequently fled to Western Europe, particularly to Calabria, Naples, Ragusa, and Sicily, while numerous others sought protection at the often inaccessible Mountains of Albania. Since the vast majority of Albanians were adherents of Christianity, they were considered an inferior class of people, and they were discriminated against in various forms, including being subjected to heavy taxes. Additionally, the devshirme system allowed the sultan to collect a requisite percentage of Christian adolescents from their families to compose the Janissary. The Ottoman conquest was also accompanied by the gradual process of Islamisation and the rapid construction of mosques.

A prosperous and longstanding revolution erupted after the formation of the League of Lezhë until the fall of Shkodër under the leadership of Gjergj Kastrioti Skanderbeg, who consistently defeated major Ottoman armies led by Sultans Murad II and Mehmed II. Skanderbeg managed to unite several of the Albanian principalities, amongst them the Arianitis, Dukagjinis, Zaharias, and Thopias, and establish a centralised authority over most of the non-conquered territories, becoming the lord of Albania. The Ottoman Empire's expansion ground to a halt during the time that Skanderbeg's forces resisted, and he has been credited with being one of the main reasons for the delay of Ottoman expansion into Western Europe, giving the Italian principalities more time to better prepare for the Ottoman arrival. However, the failure of most European nations, with the exception of Naples, to adequately support him, along with the failure of Pope Pius II's plans to organise a promised crusade against the Ottomans, signified that none of Skanderbeg's victories permanently hindered the Ottomans from invading the western Balkans.

Despite his competence as a military leader, Skanderbeg's victories over the Ottoman Empire's military had only a short-term impact, as his forces were unable to halt the Ottomans' advancement permanently; therefore, they successfully delayed the final conquest of Albanian lands only temporarily. The constant Ottoman invasions caused enormous destruction to Albania, greatly reducing the population and destroying flocks of livestock and crops. Besides surrender, there was no possible way Skanderbeg would be able to halt the Ottoman invasions despite his military forces achieving several consecutive victories against them. Among other factors, his manpower and resources were insufficient for a prolonged war, preventing him from expanding the war efforts and driving the Turks from the Albanian borders. Albania was therefore doomed to face an unending series of Ottoman attacks until it eventually fell years after his death.

When the Ottomans were gaining a firm foothold in the region, Albanian towns were organised into four principal sanjaks. The government fostered trade by settling a sizeable Jewish colony of refugees fleeing persecution in Spain. Vlorë saw passing through its ports imported merchandise from Europe, such as velvets, cotton goods, mohairs, carpets, spices, and leather from Bursa and Constantinople. Some citizens of Vlorë even had business associates throughout Europe.

The phenomenon of Islamisation among the Albanians became primarily widespread from the 17th century and continued into the 18th century. Islam offered them equal opportunities and advancement within the Ottoman Empire. However, according to some scholars, motives for conversion were diverse depending on the context; although the lack of source material significantly hampers efforts to investigate such issues. As a result of the Ottomans' increasing suppression of Catholicism, most Catholic Albanians converted in the 17th century, while Orthodox Albanians followed suit mainly in the following century.

Since the Albanian-inhabited regions were considered strategically important, Albanians made up a significant proportion of the Ottoman Empire's military and bureaucracy. Consequently, many Muslim Albanians attained important political and military positions, while their work made a significant cultural contribution to the broader Muslim world. Enjoying this privileged position, they held various high administrative positions, which, among others, included over two dozen Albanians serving as grand viziers of the Ottoman Empire. Additionally, other distinguished Albanians included members of the prominent Köprülü family, Zagan Pasha, Muhammad Ali of Egypt, and Ali Pasha of Tepelena. Furthermore, two Ottoman sultans, Bayezid II and Mehmed III, were born to mothers of Albanian ethnic backgrounds.

=== Rilindja ===
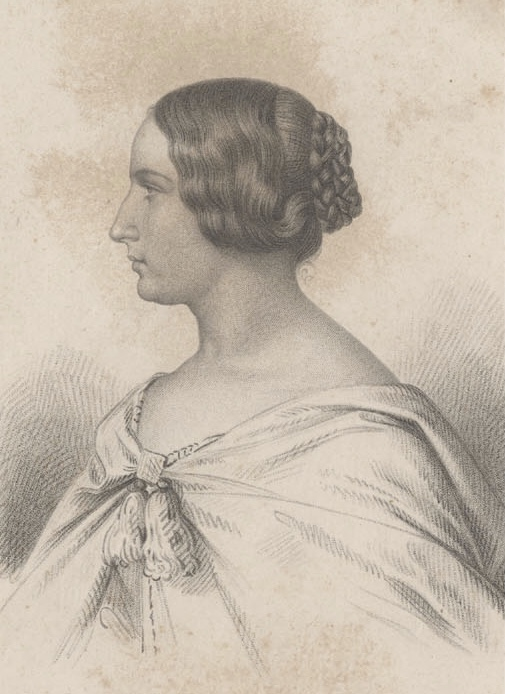
Dora d'Istria was among the main advocates in Europe for the Albanian cause.

The Albanian Renaissance was a period with its roots in the late 18th century and continuing into the 19th century, during which the Albanian people gathered spiritual and intellectual strength for an independent cultural and political life within an independent nation. Modern Albanian culture flourished too, especially Albanian literature and arts, and was frequently linked to the influences of the Romanticism and Enlightenment principles. Prior to the rise of nationalism, Ottoman authorities suppressed any expression of national unity or conscience by the Albanian people.

The victory of Russia over the Ottoman Empire following the Russian-Ottoman Wars resulted the execution of the Treaty of San Stefano which assigned Albanian-populated lands to their Slavic and Greek neighbours. However, the United Kingdom and Austro-Hungarian Empire consequently blocked the arrangement and caused the Treaty of Berlin. From this point, Albanians started to organise themselves with the goal to protect and unite the Albanian-populated lands into a unitary nation, leading to the formation of the League of Prizren. The league had initially the assistance of the Ottoman authorities whose position was based on the religious solidarity of Muslim people and landlords connected with the Ottoman administration. They favoured and protected the Muslim solidarity and called for defence of Muslim lands simultaneously constituting the reason for titling the league Committee of the Real Muslims.

Approximately 300 Muslims participated in the assembly composed by delegates from Bosnia, the administrator of the Sanjak of Prizren as representatives of the central authorities and no delegates from Vilayet of Scutari. Signed by only 47 Muslim deputies, the league issued the Kararname that contained a proclamation that the people from northern Albania, Epirus and Bosnia and Herzegovina are willing to defend the territorial integrity of the Ottoman Empire by all possible means against the troops of Bulgaria, Serbia and Montenegro.

Ottomans authorities cancelled their assistance when the league, under Abdyl Frashëri, became focused on working towards Albanian autonomy and requested merging four vilayets—Kosovo, Shkodër, Monastir and Ioannina—into a unified vilayet, the Albanian Vilayet. The league used military force to prevent the annexing areas of Plav and Gusinje assigned to Montenegro. After several successful battles with Montenegrin troops, such as the Battle of Novšiće, the league was forced to retreat from their contested regions. The league was later defeated by the Ottoman army sent by the sultan.

==== Independence ====
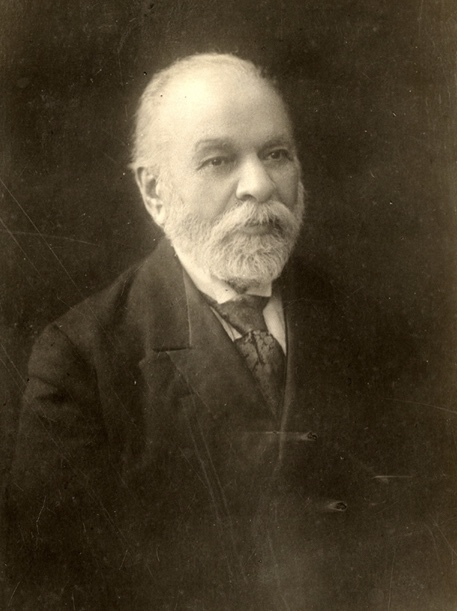
Ismail Qemali is regarded as the founding father of the modern Albanian nation.

Albania declared independence from the Ottoman Empire on 28 November 1912, accompanied by the establishment of the Senate and Government by the Assembly of Vlorë on 4 December. Its sovereignty was recognised by the Conference of London. On 29 July 1913, the Treaty of London delineated the borders of the country and its neighbors, leaving many Albanians outside Albania, predominantly partitioned between Montenegro, Serbia, and Greece.

Headquartered in Vlorë, the International Commission of Control was established on 15 October 1913 to take care of the administration of Albania until its own political institutions were in order. The International Gendarmerie was established as the Principality of Albania's first law enforcement agency. In November, the first gendarmerie members arrived in the country. Wilhelm of Wied (Princ Vilhelm Vidi) was selected as the first prince of the principality. On 7 March, he arrived in the provisional capital of Durrës and began to organise his government, appointing Turhan Pasha Përmeti to form the first Albanian cabinet. The pro-Ottoman forces had offered the throne to the Ottoman war minister of Albanian origin, Ahmed Izzet Pasha. The pro-Ottoman peasants believed that the new regime was a tool of the six Christian Great Powers and local landowners, who owned half of the arable land.

In February 1914, the Autonomous Republic of Northern Epirus was proclaimed in Gjirokastër by the local Greek population against incorporation to Albania. This initiative was short-lived, and in 1921 the southern provinces were incorporated into the Albanian Principality. High-ranking Orthodox clergy were among the strongest opponents of the Albanian National Awakening. Reports from the period, including those from international observers, documented the burning of villages and civilian casualties. Nationalist Orthodox insurgents were accused of targeting Muslim Albanian populations to consolidate territorial claims for Greece. Meanwhile, the revolt of Albanian peasants against the regime erupted under the leadership of the group of Muslim clerics gathered around Essad Pasha Toptani, who proclaimed himself the savior of Albania and Islam. To gain the support of the Mirdita Catholic volunteers from northern Albania, Wilhelm appointed their leader Prênk Bibë Doda as foreign minister of the Principality of Albania. In May and June 1914, the International Gendarmerie was joined by Isa Boletini and his men, mostly from Kosovo, and the rebels defeated northern Mirdita Catholics, capturing most of central Albania by the end of August. Wilhelm's regime collapsed, and he left the country on 3 September.

=== First Republic ===
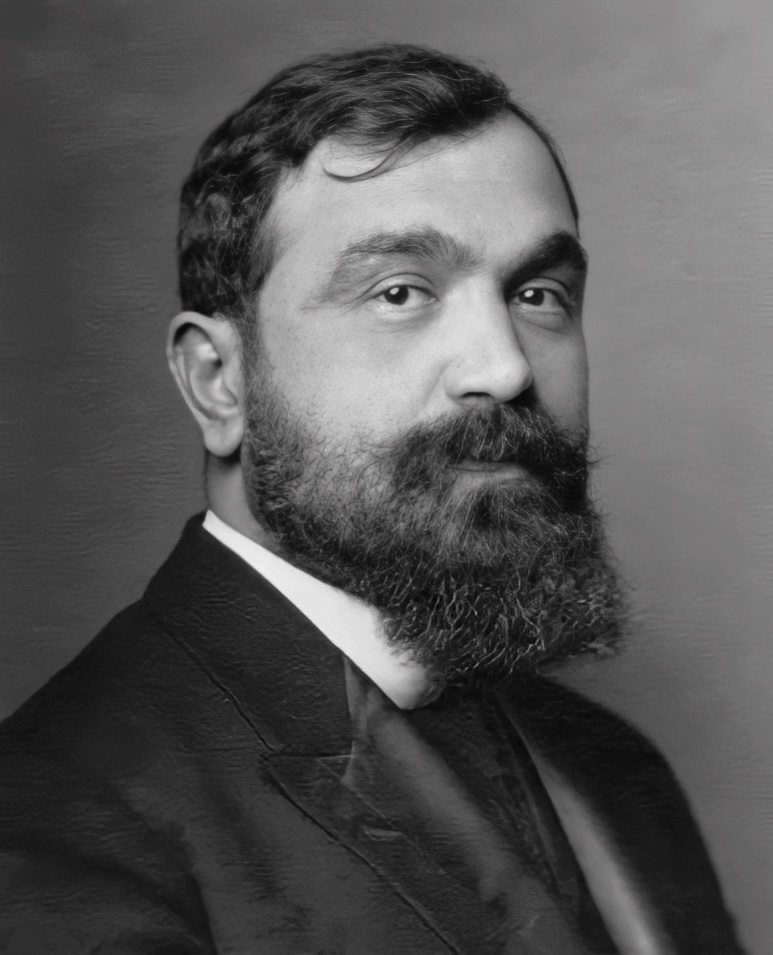
Fan Noli played a significant role in the 20th century, advocating for Albanian independence and cultural revival, while also serving as Prime Minister in 1924 and later as the head of the Albanian Orthodox Church.

The interwar period was marked by persistent economic and social difficulties, political instability and foreign interventions. After World War I, Albania lacked an established government and internationally recognised borders, rendering it vulnerable to neighboring entities such as Greece, Italy, and Yugoslavia, all of which sought to expand their influence. This led to political uncertainty, highlighted in 1918 when the Congress of Durrës sought Paris Peace Conference protection but was denied, further complicating Albania's position on the international stage. Territorial tensions escalated as Yugoslavia and particularly Serbia sought control of northern Albania, while Greece aimed dominance in southern Albania. The situation deteriorated in 1919 when the Serbs launched attacks on Albanian inhabitants, among others in Gusinje and Plav, resulting in massacres and large-scale displacement. Meanwhile, Italian influence continued to expand during this time, driven by economic interests and political ambitions.

Fan Noli, renowned for his idealism, became prime minister in 1924, with a vision to institute a Western-style constitutional government, abolish feudalism, counter Italian influence, and enhance critical sectors, including infrastructure, education and healthcare. He faced resistance from former allies, who had assisted in the removal of Zog from power, and struggled to secure foreign aid to implement his agenda. Noli's decision to establish diplomatic ties with the Soviet Union, an adversary of the Serbian elite, ignited allegations of bolshevism from Belgrade. This in turn led to increased pressure from Italy and culminated in Zog's restoration to authority. In 1928, Zog transitioned Albania from a republic to a monarchy that garnered backing from fascist Italy, with Zog assuming the title of King Zog I. Key constitutional changes dissolved the Senate and established a unicameral National Assembly while preserving Zog's authoritative powers.

In 1939, Italy under Benito Mussolini launched a military invasion of Albania, resulting in the exile of Zog and the creation of an Italian protectorate. As World War II progressed, Italy aimed to expand its territorial dominion in the Balkans, including territorial claims on regions of Greece (Chameria), Macedonia, Montenegro and Kosovo. These ambitions laid the foundation of Greater Albania, which aimed to unite all areas with Albanian-majority populations into a single country. In 1943, as Italy's control declined, Nazi Germany assumed control of Albania, subjecting Albanians to forced labour, economic exploitation and repression under German rule. This period saw the forced expulsion and massacres of the Cham Albanians, a predominantly Muslim group. The religious divide was used as a justification for violence, with some Orthodox locals reportedly identifying Muslim neighbors to paramilitary groups, leading to massacres and the forced expulsion of thousands. The tide shifted in 1944 when Albanian partisan forces, under the leadership of Enver Hoxha and other communist leaders, successfully liberated Albania from German occupation.

=== Socialist Republic ===
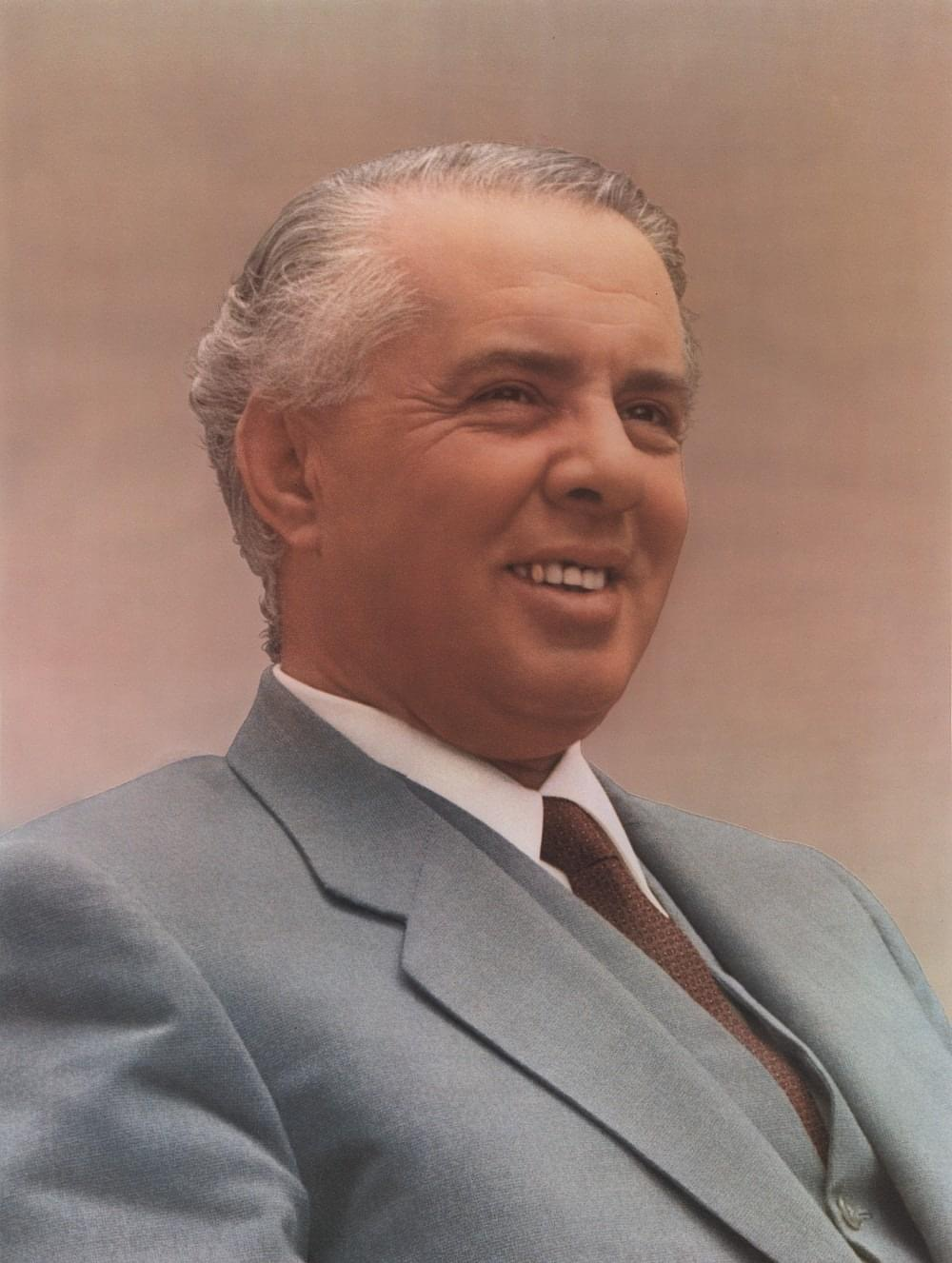
Enver Hoxha was the founding leader of communist Albania and its ruler for over four decades, implementing a regime marked by authoritarianism and isolationism.

The establishment of the People's Socialist Republic of Albania under the leadership of Hoxha was a significant epoch in Albanian history. Hoxha's regime embraced Marxist–Leninist ideologies and implemented authoritarian policies, including prohibition of religious practices, severe restrictions on travel, and abolition of private property rights. It was also defined by a persistent pattern of purges, extensive repression, instances of betrayal, and hostility to external influences. Any form of opposition or resistance to his rule was met with expeditious and severe consequences, such as internal exile, extended imprisonment, and execution.

The regime confronted a multitude of challenges, including widespread poverty, illiteracy, health crises and gender inequality. In response, Hoxha initiated a modernisation initiative aimed at attaining economic and social liberation and transforming Albania into an industrial society. The regime placed a high priority on the diversification of the economy through Soviet-style industrialisation, comprehensive infrastructure development such as the introduction of a transformative railway system, expansion of education and healthcare services, elimination of adult illiteracy, and targeted advancements in areas such as women's rights.

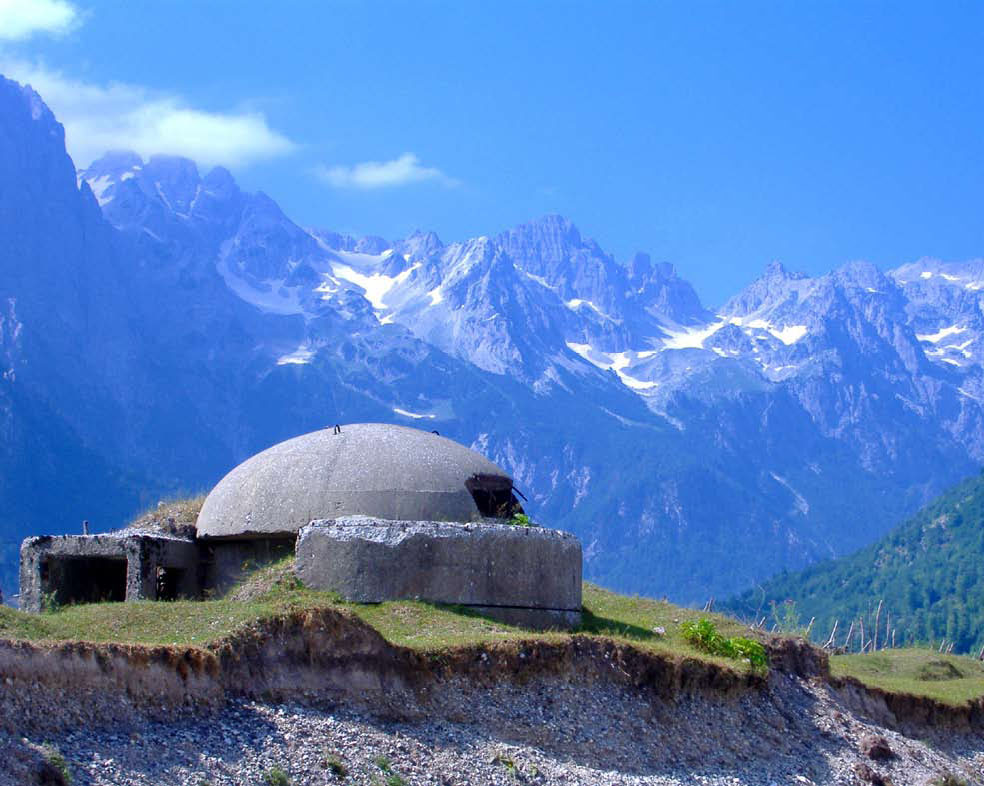
Bunkers in Albania were constructed to prevent potential external invasions. By 1983, approximately 173,371 bunkers were scattered throughout its territory.

Diplomacy under Hoxha was characterised by notable conflicts. Initially aligned with Yugoslavia as a satellite state, the relationship deteriorated as Yugoslavia aimed to incorporate Albania within its territory. Subsequently, Albania established relations with the Soviet Union and engaged trade agreements with other Eastern European countries but experienced disagreements over Soviet policies, leading to strained ties with Moscow and diplomatic separation in 1961. Simultaneously, tensions with the West heightened with Albania's refusal to hold free elections and allegations of Western support for anti-communist uprisings. Albania's enduring partnership was with China; it sided with Beijing during the Sino-Soviet conflict, resulting in severed ties with the Soviet Union and withdrawal from the Warsaw Pact in response to the invasion of Czechoslovakia in 1968. But their relations stagnated in 1970, prompting both to reassess their commitment, and Albania actively reduced its dependence on China.

Under Hoxha's regime, Albania underwent a widespread campaign targeting religious clergy of various faiths, resulting in public persecution and executions, particularly targeting Muslims, Roman Catholics and Eastern Orthodox adherents. In 1946, religious estates underwent nationalisation, coinciding with the closure or transformation of religious institutions into various other purposes. This culminated in 1976, when Albania became the world's first constitutionally atheist state. Under this regime, citizens were forced to renounce their religious beliefs, adopt a secular way of life, and embrace socialist ideology.

=== Fourth Republic ===
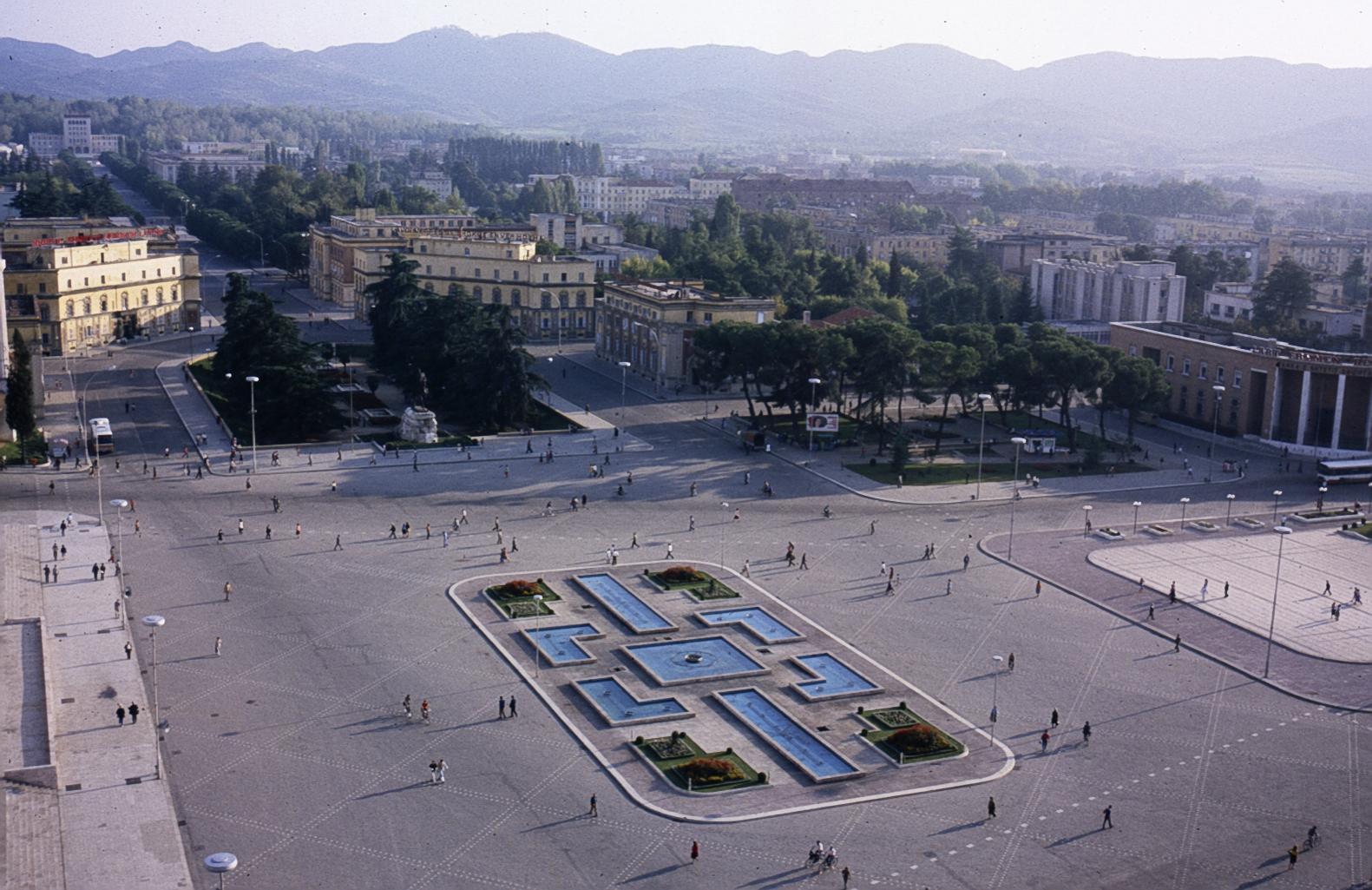
In 1988, the first foreigners were allowed to walk into the car-free Skanderbeg Square in Tirana.

After four decades of communism paired with the revolutions of 1989, Albania witnessed a notable rise in political activism, particularly among students, which led to a transformation in the prevailing order. After the first multi-party elections of 1991, the communist party maintained a stronghold in the parliament until its defeat in the parliamentary elections of 1992 directed by the Democratic Party.

Considerable economic and financial resources were devoted to pyramid schemes that were widely supported by the government. The schemes swept up somewhere between one sixth and one third of the population. Despite the International Monetary Fund's warnings, Sali Berisha defended the schemes as large investment firms, leading more people to redirect their remittances and sell their homes and cattle for cash to deposit in the schemes. The schemes began to collapse in late 1996, leading many of the investors to join initially peaceful protests against the government, requesting their money back. The protests turned violent in February 1997 as government forces responded by firing on the demonstrators. In March, the Police and Republican Guard deserted, leaving their armories open. These were promptly emptied by militias and criminal gangs. The resulting civil war caused a wave of evacuations of foreign nationals and refugees.

The crisis led both Aleksandër Meksi and Sali Berisha to resign from office in the wake of the general election. In April 1997, Operation Alba, a U.N. peacekeeping force led by Italy, entered Albania with two goals: to assist with the evacuation of expatriates and secure the ground for international organisations. The main international organisation involved was the Western European Union's multinational Albanian Police element, which worked with the government to restructure the judicial system and simultaneously the Albanian police.

=== Contemporary ===
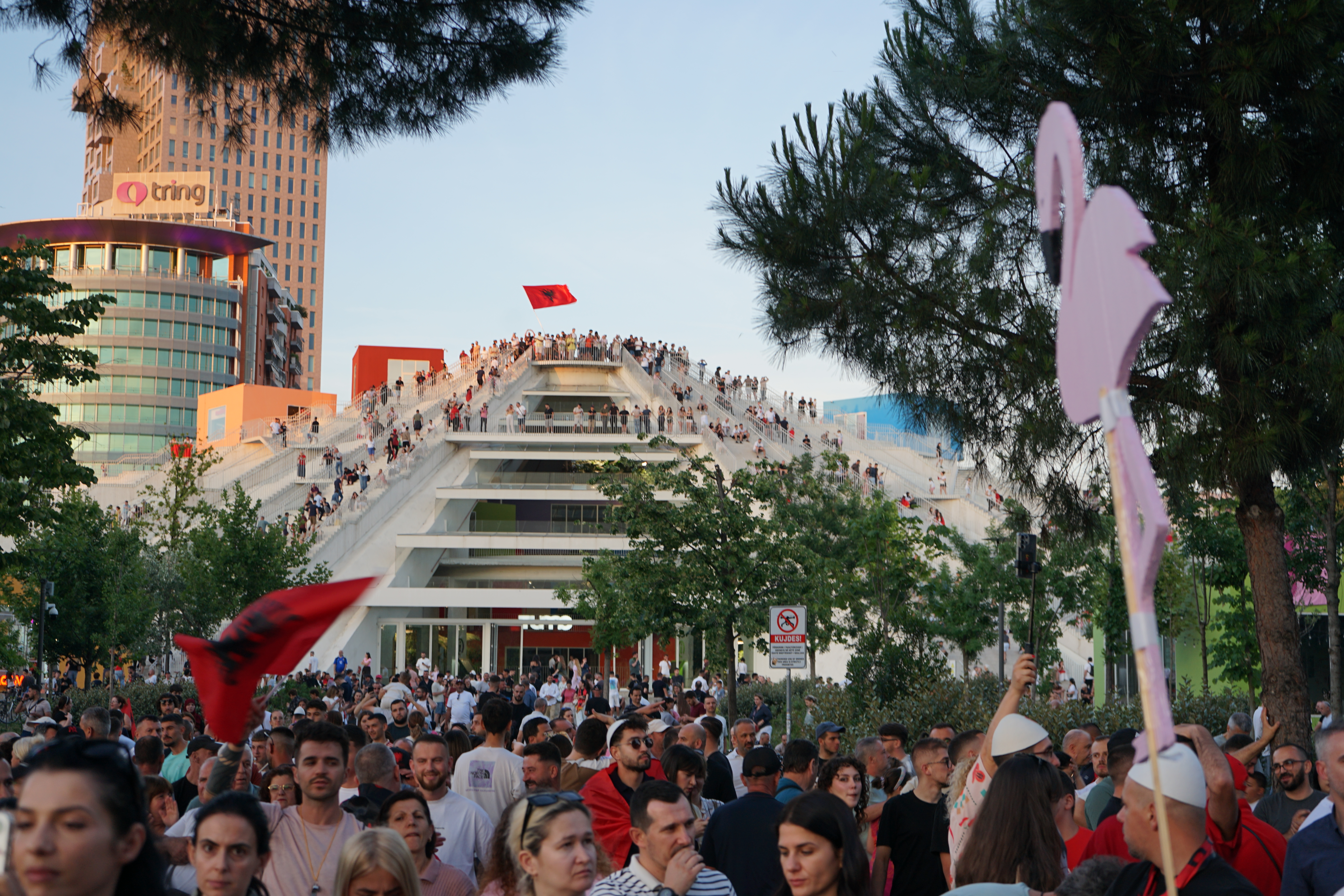
Demonstrators during the Flamingo Revolution in Tirana, an ongoing protest movement that began in May 2026 and has focused on environmental protection, transparency, political accountability and calls for the resignation of Prime Minister Edi Rama.

After its communist system disintegrated, Albania embarked on an active path towards Westernisation with the ambition to obtain membership in the European Union (EU) and the North Atlantic Treaty Organisation (NATO). A notable milestone was reached in 2009 when the country attained membership in NATO, marking a pioneering achievement among the nations of southeastern Europe. In adherence to its vision for further integration into the EU, it formally applied for membership on 28 April 2009. Another milestone was reached on 24 June 2014, when the country was granted official candidate status.

Edi Rama of the Socialist Party won both the 2013 and 2017 parliamentary elections. As prime minister, he implemented numerous reforms focused on modernising the economy, as well as democratising state institutions, including the judiciary and law enforcement. Unemployment has steadily declined. Rama placed gender equality at the centre of his agenda; since 2017 almost 50% of the ministers have been female, the largest number of women serving in the country's history. During the 2021 parliamentary elections, the ruling Socialist Party led by Rama secured its third consecutive victory, winning nearly half of votes and enough seats in parliament to govern alone.

On 26 November 2019, a 6.4 magnitude earthquake ravaged Albania, with the epicentre about 16 km (10 mi) southwest of Mamurras. The tremor was felt in Tirana and in places as far away as Taranto, Italy, and Belgrade, Serbia, while the most affected areas were Durrës and Kodër-Thumanë. Comprehensive response to the earthquake included substantial humanitarian aid from the Albanian diaspora and various countries around the world.

On 9 March 2020, COVID-19 was confirmed to have spread to Albania. From March to June 2020, the government declared a state of emergency as a measure to limit the virus's spread.

In 2026, large anti-government demonstrations known as the Flamingo Revolution emerged after proposed luxury coastal developments on Sazan Island and the Zvërnec Peninsula, including projects linked to Jared Kushner, became a focus of environmental and anti-corruption protests. Demonstrators accused Rama's government of lacking transparency, endangering protected ecosystems and failing to tackle corruption or improve public services. The protests, initially centred on environmental protection, expanded into broader demands for government accountability, early elections and Rama's resignation. European Parliament figures also warned that the coastal-development plans could affect Albania's EU accession process if they conflicted with environmental obligations and democratic standards.

== Geography ==
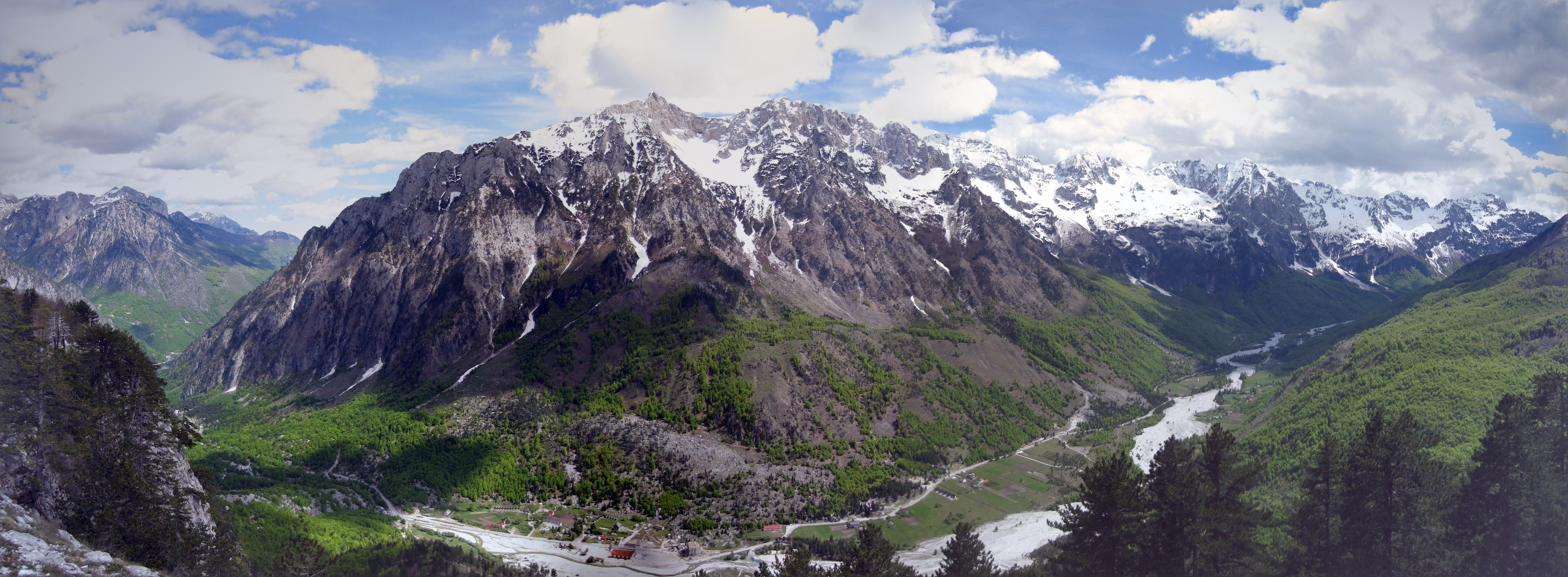
The Albanian Alps are an extension and simultaneously the highest section of the Dinaric Alps.

Albania lies along the Mediterranean Sea on the Balkan Peninsula in South and Southeast Europe, and has an area of 28,748 km^{2} (11,100 sq mi). It is bordered by the Adriatic Sea to the west, Montenegro to the northwest, Kosovo to the northeast, North Macedonia to the east, Greece to the south, and the Ionian Sea to the southwest. It is between latitudes 42° and 39° N and longitudes 21° and 19° E. Geographic coordinates include Vërmosh at 42° 35' 34" northern latitude as the northernmost point, Konispol at 39° 40' 0" northern latitude as the southernmost, Sazan at 19° 16' 50" eastern longitude as the westernmost, and Vërnik at 21° 1' 26" eastern longitude as the easternmost. Mount Korab, rising at 2,764 m (9,068.24 ft) above the Adriatic, is the highest point, while the Mediterranean Sea, at 0 m (0.00 ft), is the lowest. The country extends 148 km (92 mi) from east to west and around 340 km (211 mi) from north to south.

Albania has a diverse and varied landscape with mountains and hills that traverse its territory in various directions. There are extensive mountain ranges, including the Albanian Alps in the north, the Korab Mountains in the east, the Pindus Mountains in the southeast, the Ceraunian Mountains in the southwest, and the Skanderbeg Mountains in the centre. In the northwest is Lake Shkodër, Southern Europe's largest lake. Towards the southeast is Lake Ohrid, one of the world's oldest continuously existing lakes. Farther south, the expanse includes the Large and Small Lake of Prespa, some of the Balkans' highest lakes. Rivers rise mostly in the east and discharge into the Adriatic and Ionian Seas. The longest river is the Drin, which starts at the confluence of its two headwaters, the Black Drin and White Drin. Of particular concern is the Vjosë, one of Europe's last intact large river systems.

Forest cover is around 29.% of the total land area, equivalent to 788,900 hectares (ha) of forest in 2020, up from 788,800 hectares (ha) in 1990. Of the naturally regenerating forest 11% was reported to be primary forest (consisting of native tree species with no clearly visible indications of human activity) and around 0% of the forest area was found within protected areas. In 2015, 97% of the forest area was reported to be under public ownership, 3% private ownership and 0% with ownership listed as other or unknown.

=== Climate ===
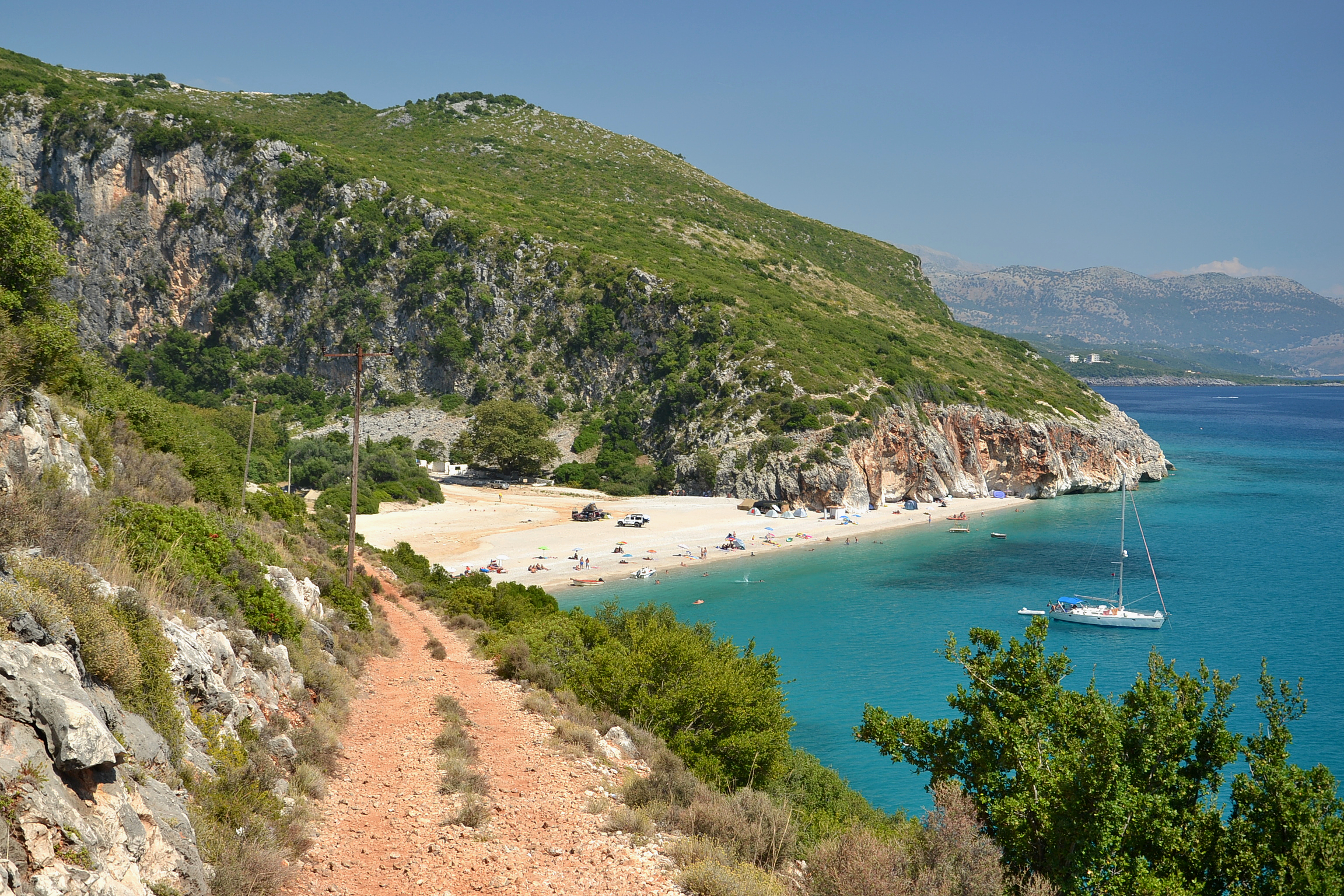
Gjipe is located on the confluence of the Adriatic and Ionian Sea, on the Albanian Riviera.

The climate of Albania exhibits a distinguished level of variability and diversity because of the differences in latitude, longitude and altitude. There are five primary climatic types, spanning from Mediterranean and subtropical in the western half to oceanic, continental and subarctic in the eastern half of the country. The coastal regions are the warmest areas, while the northern and eastern regions encompassing the Albanian Alps and the Korab Mountains the coldest areas in the country. Throughout the year, the average monthly temperatures fluctuate, ranging from −1 °C (30 °F) during the winter months to 21.8 °C (71.2 °F) in the summer months. The highest recorded temperature of 43.9 °C (111.0 °F) was observed in Kuçovë on 18 July 1973, while the lowest temperature of −29 °C (−20 °F) was recorded in Shtyllë, Librazhd on 9 January 2017.

Albania receives most of the precipitation in winter months and less in summer months. The average precipitation is about 1,485 millimetres (58.5 inches). The mean annual precipitation ranges between 600 and 3,000 millimetres (24 and 118 inches) depending on geographical location. The northwestern and southeastern highlands receive the intenser amount of precipitation, whilst the northeastern and southwestern highlands as well as the Western Lowlands the more limited amount. The Albanian Alps are among the most humid regions of Europe, receiving at least 3,100 mm (122.0 in) of rain annually. Four glaciers within these mountains were discovered at a relatively low altitude of 2,000 metres (6,600 ft), which is rare for such a southerly latitude.

=== Biodiversity ===
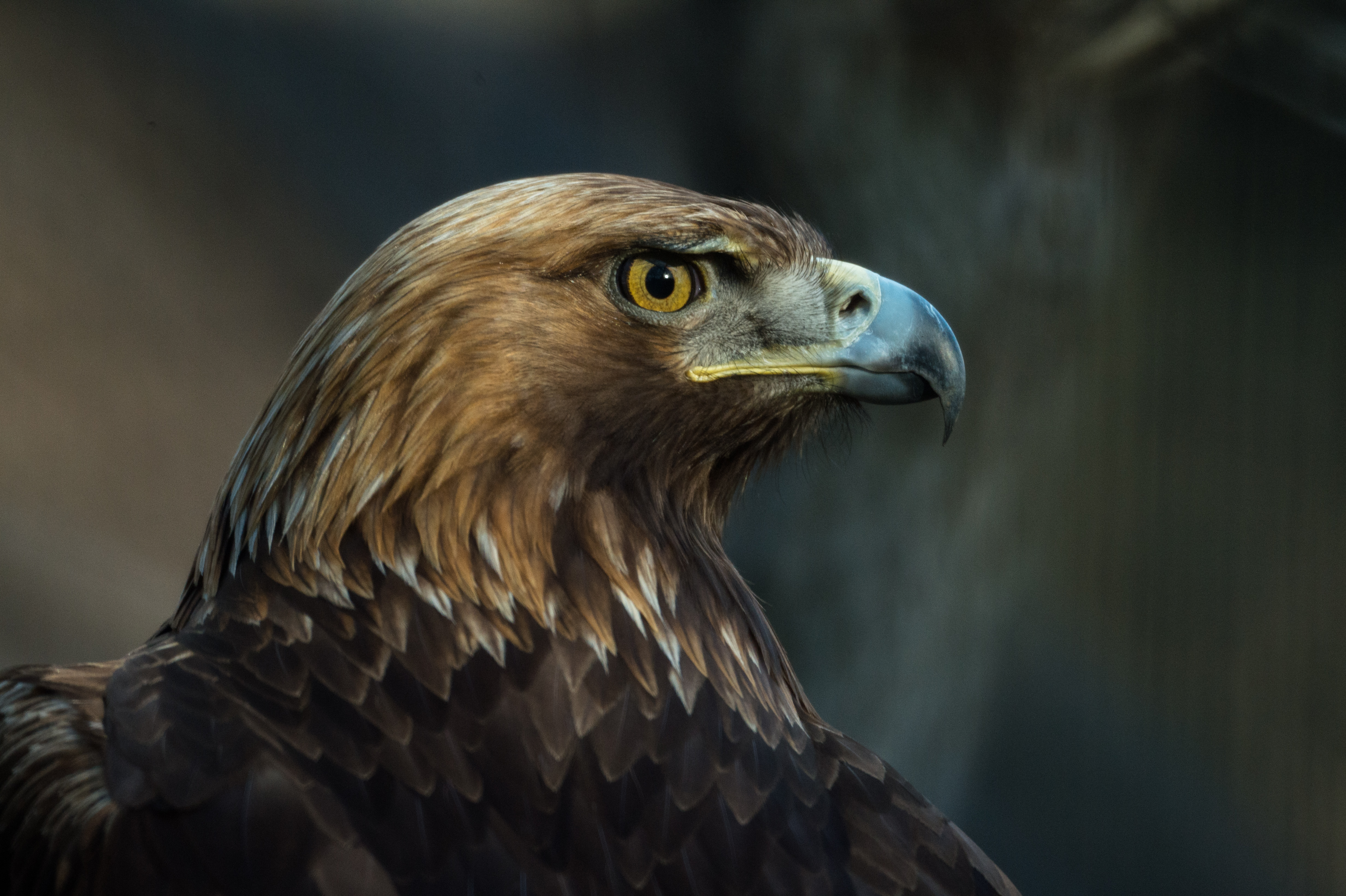
The golden eagle is the national symbol and animal of Albania.

A biodiversity hotspot, Albania possesses an exceptionally rich and contrasting biodiversity on account of its geographical location at the centre of the Mediterranean Sea and the great diversity in its climatic, geological and hydrological conditions. Because of remoteness, the mountains and hills are covered with forests, trees and grasses that are essential to the lives for a wide variety of animals, including the endangered Balkan lynx and brown bear, as well as the wildcat, grey wolf, red fox, golden jackal, Egyptian vulture and golden eagle.

The estuaries, wetlands and lakes are extraordinarily important for the greater flamingo, pygmy cormorant and the extremely rare and perhaps the most iconic bird of the country, the dalmatian pelican. Of particular importance are the Mediterranean monk seal, loggerhead sea turtle and green sea turtle that use to nest on the country's coastal waters and shores.

In terms of phytogeography, Albania is part of the Boreal Kingdom and stretches specifically within the Illyrian province of the Circumboreal and Mediterranean Region. Its territory can be subdivided into four terrestrial ecoregions of the Palearctic realm namely within the Illyrian deciduous forests, Balkan mixed forests, Pindus Mountains mixed forests and Dinaric Mountains mixed forests. Approximately 3,500 different species of plants can be found in Albania which refers principally to a Mediterranean and Eurasian character. The country maintains a vibrant tradition of herbal and medicinal practices. At the minimum 300 plants growing locally are used in the preparation of herbs and medicines. The trees within the forests are primarily fir, oak, beech and pine.

=== Conservation ===
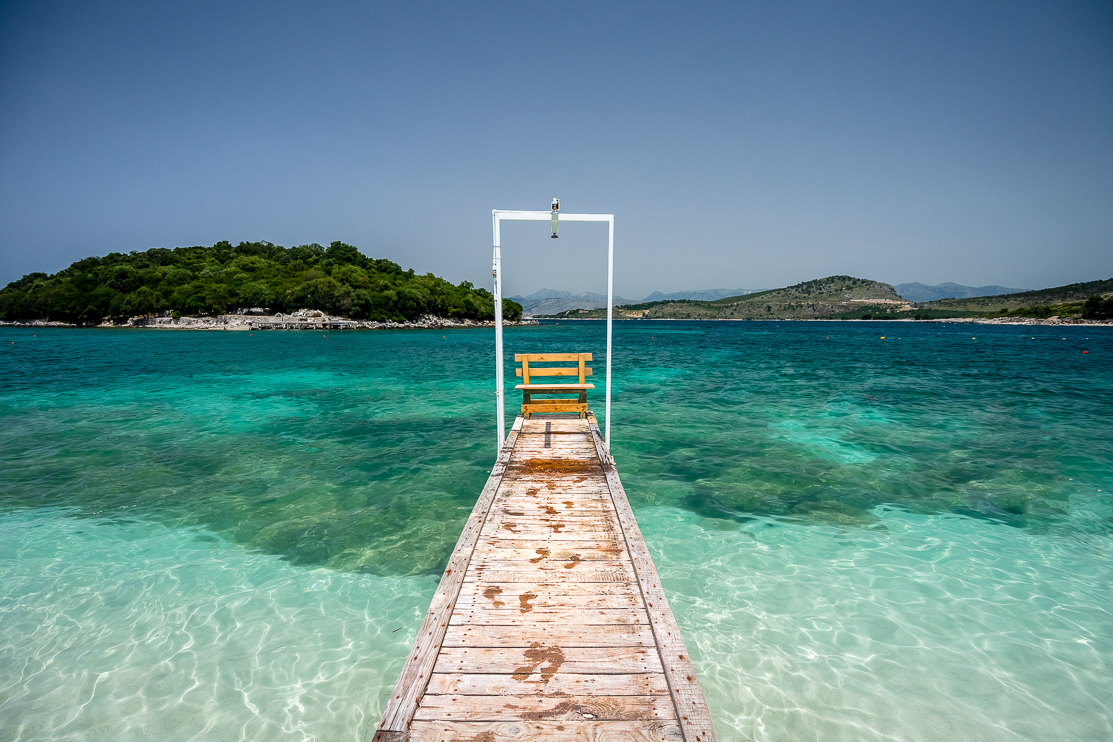
The islets of Ksamil lie in the Butrint National Park.

Albania has been an active participant in numerous international agreements and conventions aimed at strengthing its commitment to the preservation and sustainable management of biological diversity. Since 1994, the country is a party to the Convention on Biological Diversity and its associated Cartagena and Nagoya Protocols. To uphold these commitments, it has developed and implemented a comprehensive National Biodiversity Strategy and Action Plan. Albania has established a partnership with the International Union for Conservation of Nature, advancing its conservation efforts on both national and international scales.

As a signatory to the Ramsar Convention, Albania has granted special recognition upon four wetlands, designating them as Wetlands of International Importance, including Buna-Shkodër, Butrint, Karavasta and Prespa. The dedication to protection extends further into the sphere of UNESCO's World Network of Biosphere Reserves, operating within the framework of the Man and the Biosphere Programme, evidenced by its engagement in the Ohrid-Prespa Biosphere Reserve, the Shkodër Lake Biosphere Reserve and the Vjosë Valley Biosphere Reserve. Albania is host to two natural World Heritage Sites, which encompass the Ohrid region and both the Gashi River and Rrajca as part of Ancient and Primeval Beech Forests of the Carpathians and Other Regions of Europe.

==== Protected areas ====
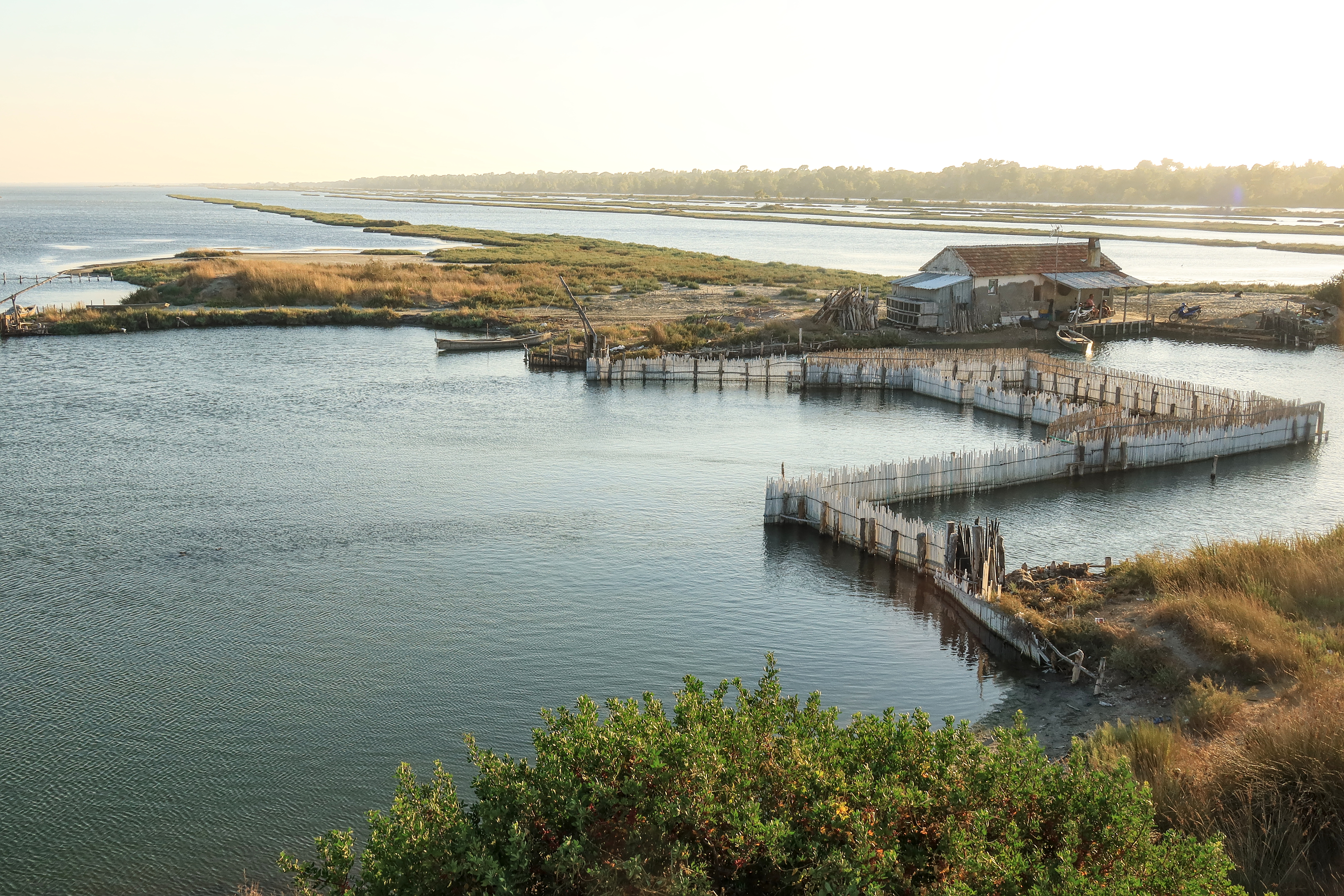
The lagoon of Karavasta within the Divjakë-Karavasta National Park

The protected areas of Albania are designated and managed by the government. There are 12 national parks, 4 ramsar sites, 1 biosphere reserve and 786 other types of conservation reserves. The Alps of Albania National Park is surrounded amidst the towering peaks of the Albanian Alps. In the east, portions of the rugged Korab, Nemërçka and Shebenik Mountains are conserved within the boundaries of Fir of Hotovë-Dangëlli National Park, Shebenik National Park and Prespa National Park.

To the south, the Ceraunian Mountains define the Albanian Ionian Sea Coast, shaping the landscape of Llogara National Park, which extends into the Karaburun Peninsula, forming the Karaburun-Sazan Marine Park. Further southward lies Butrint National Park, occupying a peninsula surrounded by the Lake of Butrint and the Vivari Channel. In the west, stretching along the Albanian Adriatic Sea Coast, the Divjakë-Karavasta National Park boasts the extensive Karavasta Lagoon, one of the largest lagoon systems in the Mediterranean Sea. Europe's first wild river national park, Vjosa National Park, safeguards the Vjosa River and its primary tributaries, which originates in the Pindus Mountains and flows to the Adriatic Sea. Dajti Mountain National Park, Lurë-Dejë Mountain National Park and Tomorr Mountain National Park protect the mountainous terrain of the centre of Albania, including the Tomorr and Skanderbeg Mountains.

==== Environmental issues ====
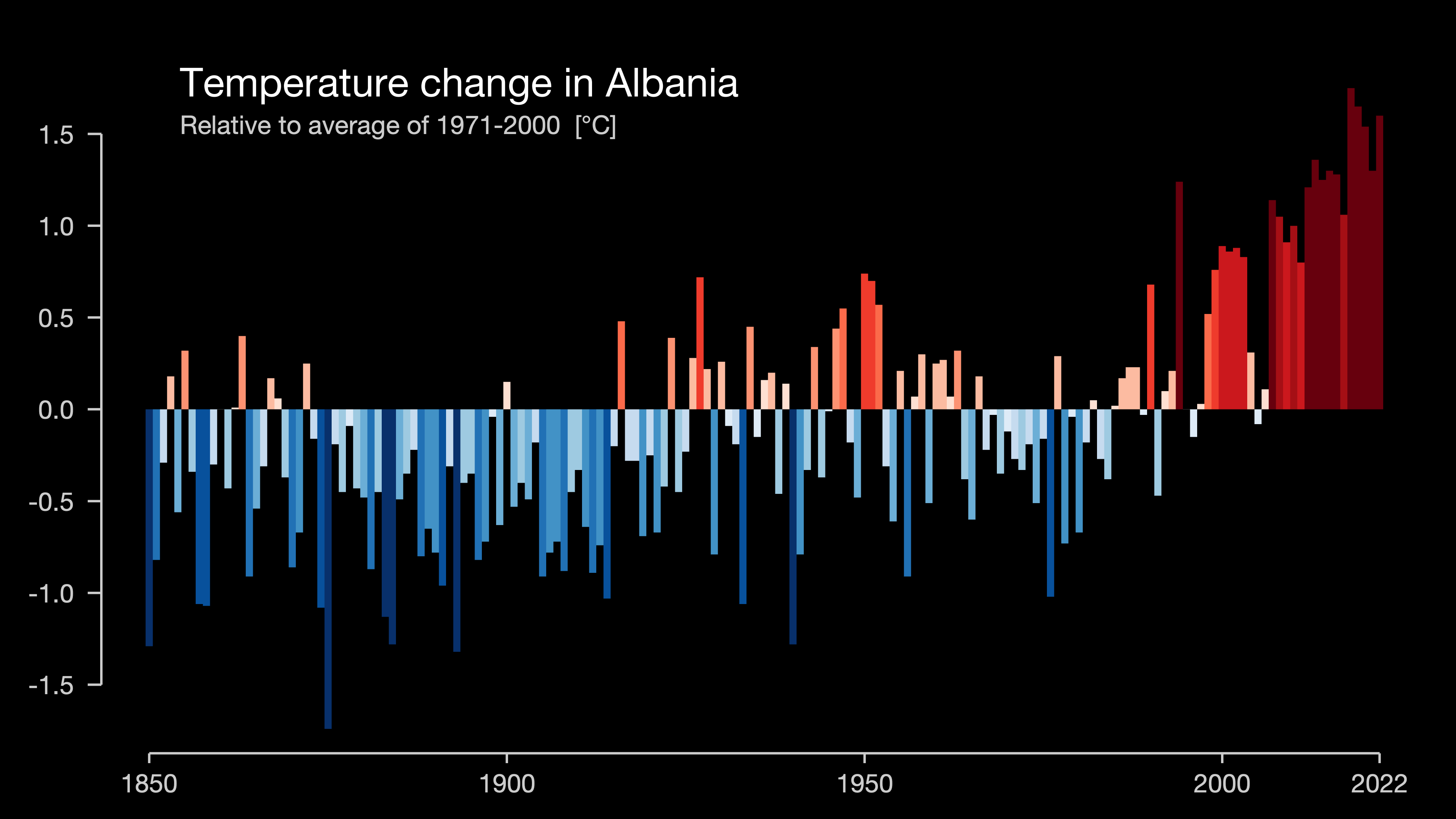
Temperature change in Albania. Each bar represents the temperature over a year.

Environmental issues in Albania notably encompass air and water pollution, climate change impacts, waste management shortcomings, biodiversity loss and imperative for nature conservation. Climate change is predicted to exert significant impacts on the quality of life. Albania is one of the European countries most at risk and vulnerable to natural disasters, Rising sea levels are anticipated to negatively impact coastal communities and the tourism industry.

In 2023 Albania emitted 7.67 million tonnes of greenhouse gases, equivalent to 2.73 tonnes per person, making it a relatively low emitting country. Albania has pledged a 20.9% reduction in greenhouse gas emissions by 2030 and net zero by 2050. The country has a moderate and improving performance in the Environmental Performance Index with an overall ranking of 62 out of 180 countries in 2022. However, its ranking has decreased since its highest placement at position 15 in the Environmental Performance Index of 2012.

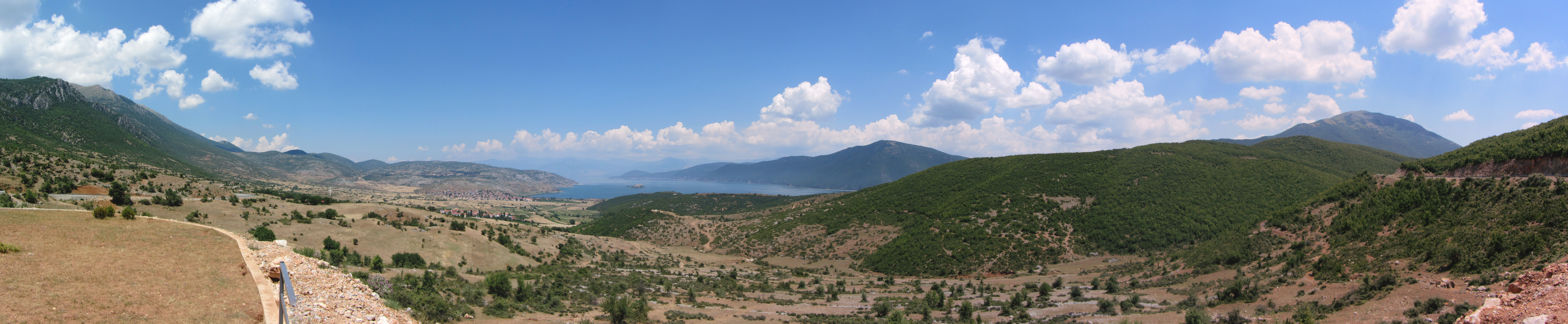
The Prespa National Park in southeastern Albania is part of the European Green Belt and Ohrid-Prespa Biosphere Reserve.

== Government and politics ==
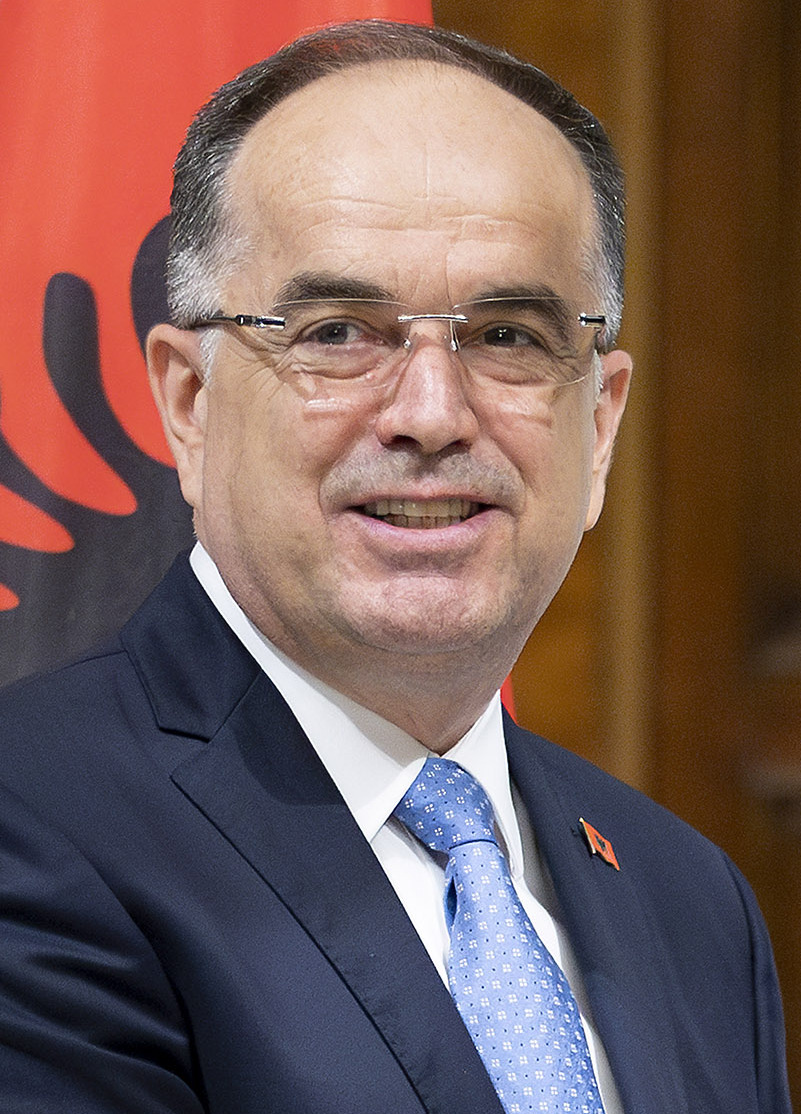
Bajram Begaj
President

Edi Rama
Prime Minister

Since declaring independence in 1912, Albania has experienced a significant political transformation, traversing through distinct periods that included a monarchical rule, a communist regime and the eventual establishment of a democratic order. In 1998, Albania transitioned into a sovereign parliamentary constitutional republic, marking a fundamental milestone in its political evolution. Its governance structure operates under a constitution that serves as the principal document of the country. The constitution is grounded in the principle of the separation of powers, with three arms of government that encompass the legislative embodied in the Parliament, the executive led by the president as the ceremonial head of state and the prime minister as the functional head of government, and the judiciary with a hierarchy of courts, including the constitutional and supreme courts as well as multiple appeal and administrative courts.

The legal system is structured to protect its people's political rights, regardless of their ethnic, linguistic, racial, or religious affiliations. Despite these principles, there are significant human rights concerns that demand attention. These concerns include issues related to the independence of the judiciary, the absence of a free media sector and the enduring problem of corruption within various governmental bodies, law enforcement agencies and other institutions. As Albania pursues its path towards EU membership, active efforts are being made to achieve substantial improvements in these areas to align with EU criteria and standards.

=== Administrative divisions ===
The counties of Albania are the first-level administrative units in Albania.

Albania is informally divided into three regions, the Northern, Central and Southern Regions. Since its Declaration of Independence in 1912, Albania has reformed its internal organisation 21 times. Presently, the primary administrative units are the 12 constituent counties (qarqe/qarqet), which hold equal status under the law.

The counties are made up of 61 second-level divisions known as municipalities (bashki/bashkia). The municipalities are the first level of local governance, responsible for local needs and law enforcement. They unified and simplified the previous system of urban and rural municipalities or communes (komuna/komunat) in 2015. For smaller issues of local government, the municipalities are organised into 373 administrative units (njësia/njësitë administrative). There are 2,980 villages (fshatra/fshatrat), neighborhoods or wards (lagje/lagjet), and localities (lokalitete/lokalitetet) previously used as administrative units.

Emblem	County	Capital	Area (km^{2})	Population (2023)	HDI (2022)
Flag of Albania	Albania (total)	Tirana	28,748	2,402,113	0.806
Emblem of Berat County	Berat	Berat	1,798	140,956	0.793
Emblem of Dibër County	Dibër	Peshkopi	2,586	107,178	0.765
Emblem of Durrës County	Durrës	Durrës	766	226,863	0.813
Emblem of Elbasan County	Elbasan	Elbasan	3,199	232,580	0.795
Emblem of Fier County	Fier	Fier	1,890	240,377	0.779
Emblem of Gjirokastër County	Gjirokastër	Gjirokastër	2,884	60,013	0.806
Emblem of Korçë County	Korçë	Korçë	3,711	173,091	0.801
Emblem of Kukës County	Kukës	Kukës	2,374	61,998	0.760
Emblem of Lezhë County	Lezhë	Lezhë	1,620	99,384	0.780
Emblem of Shkodër County	Shkodër	Shkodër	3,562	154,479	0.795
Emblem of Tirana County	Tirana	Tirana	1,652	758,513	0.832
Emblem of Vlorë County	Vlorë	Vlorë	2,706	146,681	0.814

=== Foreign relations ===
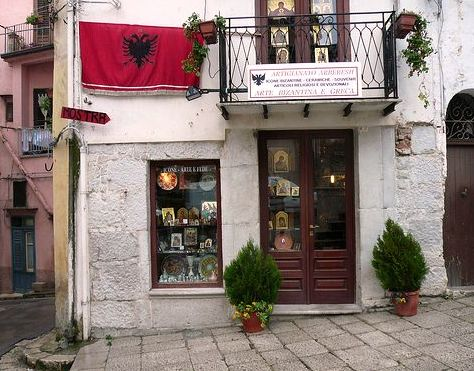
Assisted by the governments of Kosovo and Albania, an official application for the inclusion of the Arbëreshë people in the list of UNESCO's Intangible Cultural Heritage is being prepared.

During the communist period, Albania pursued an increasingly isolationist foreign policy under Enver Hoxha, severely restricting contact with the outside world. Foreign tourism was tightly controlled. Albania was effectively barred to American tourists for more than four decades. The Albanian government lifted the ban in 1990, during the leadership of Ramiz Alia, allowing American tourists to visit.

Emerging from decades of isolation following the fall of communism, Albania has adopted a foreign policy orientation centred on active cooperation and engagement in international affairs. At the core of Albania's foreign policies lie a set of objectives, which encompass the commitment to protect its sovereignty and territorial integrity, the cultivation of diplomatic ties with other countries, advocating for international recognition of Kosovo, addressing the concerns related to the expulsion of Cham Albanians, pursuing Euro-Atlantic integration and protecting the rights of the Albanians in Kosovo, Greece, Italy, Montenegro, North Macedonia, Serbia and the diaspora.

The external affairs underscore the country's dedication to regional stability and integration into major international institutions. Albania became a member of the United Nations (UN) in 1955, shortly after emerging from a period of isolation during the communist era. Since obtaining candidate status in 2014, the country has embarked on a comprehensive reform agenda to align itself with European Union (EU) accession standards.

Albania and Kosovo maintain a fraternal relationship strengthened by their substantial cultural, ethnical and historical ties. Both countries foster enduring diplomatic ties, with Albania actively supporting Kosovo's development and international integration efforts. Its fundamental contribution to Kosovo's path to independence is underscored by its early recognition of Kosovo's sovereignty in 2008. Furthermore, both governments hold annual joint meetings, displayed by the inaugural meeting in 2014, which serves as an official platform to enhance bilateral cooperation and reinforce their joint commitment to policies that promote the stability and prosperity of the broader Albanian region.

=== Military ===
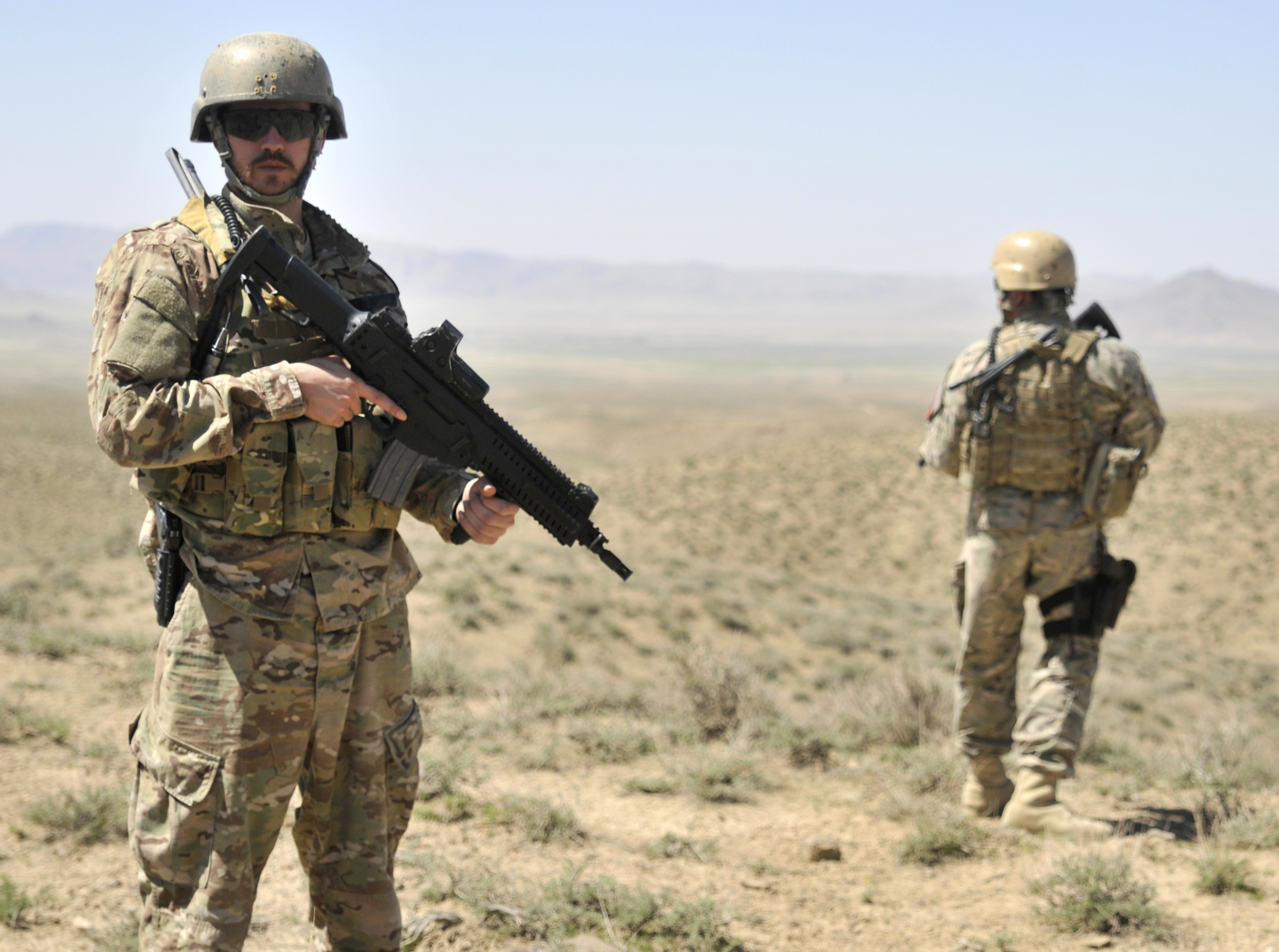
Albanian soldiers in the Province of Kandahar, Afghanistan

The Albanian Armed Forces consist of Land, Air and Naval Forces and constitute the military and paramilitary forces. They are led by a commander-in-chief under the supervision of the Ministry of Defence and by the president as the supreme commander during wartime. In times of peace its powers are executed through the prime minister and the defence minister.

The chief purpose of the armed forces is the defence of the independence, the sovereignty and the territorial integrity of the country, as well as the participation in humanitarian, combat, non-combat and peace support operations. Military service is voluntary since 2010 with the age of 19 being the legal minimum age for the duty.

Albania has committed to increase the participations in multinational operations. Since the fall of communism, the country has participated in six international missions but only one United Nations mission in Georgia, where it sent three military observers. Since February 2008, Albania has participated officially in NATO's Operation Active Endeavor in the Mediterranean Sea. Albania reduced the number of active troops from 65,000 in 1988 to 14,500 in 2009. The military consists mainly of a small fleet of aircraft and sea vessels. Increasing the military budget was one of the most important conditions for NATO integration. As of 1996 military spending was an estimated 1.5% of the country's GDP, only to peak in 2009 at 2% and fall again to 1.5%.

=== Human rights ===
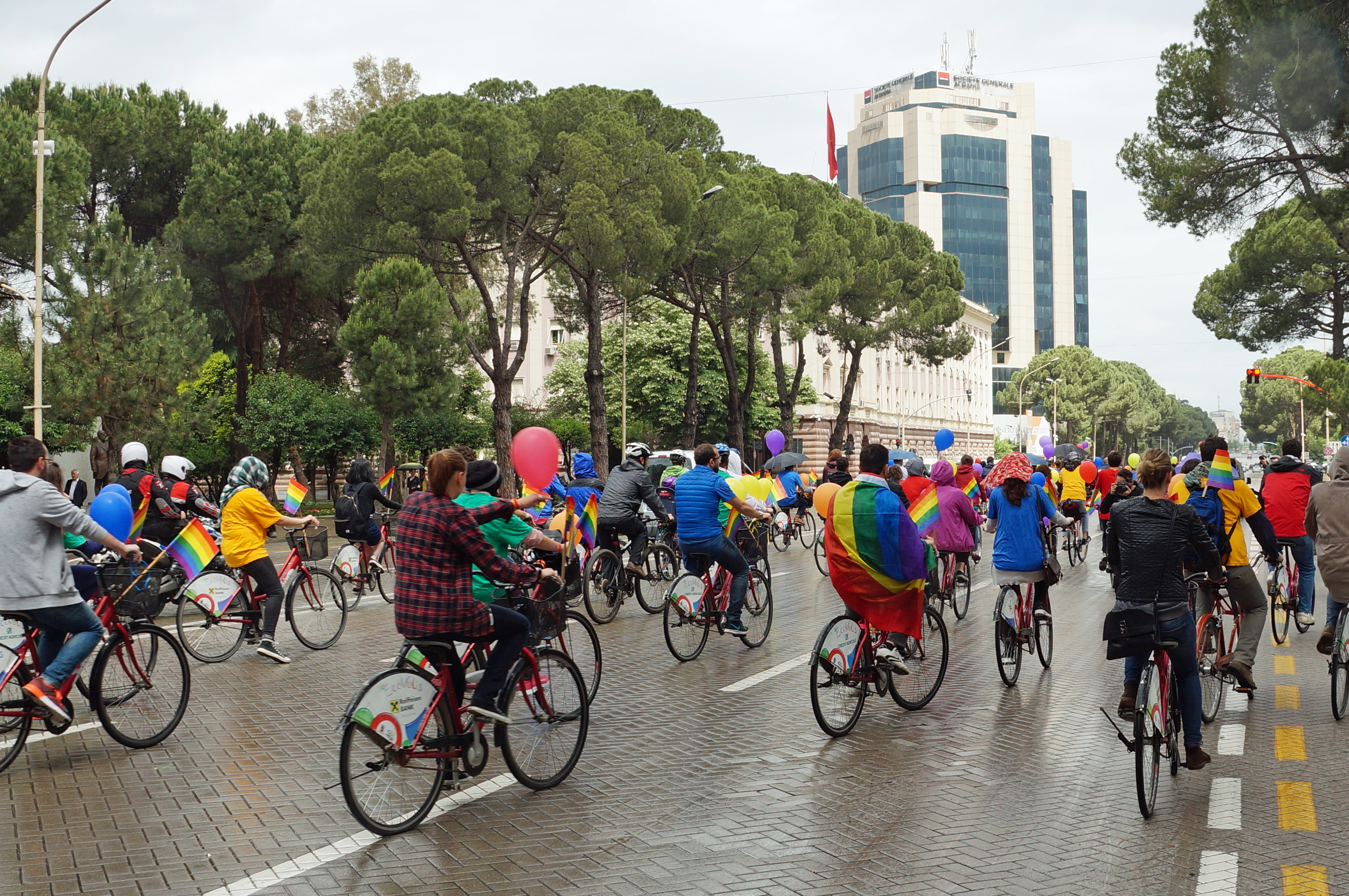
2016 LGBT+ Pride in Tirana

Nearly 60% of women in rural areas suffer physical or psychological violence and nearly 8% are victims of sexual violence. Protection orders are often violated. In 2014 the Albanian Helsinki Committee reported that the number of female murder victims is high. The Commissioner for Protection from Discrimination has raised concerns regarding the family registration law that discriminates against women. As a result, heads of households, who are overwhelmingly men, have the right to change family residency without their partners' permission.

In 2015, the association ILGA-Europe ranked Albania 19th in terms of LGBT rights out of 49 observed European countries. On the latest report in 2022, lack of progress caused Albania to be ranked the 28th country in Europe, among 49 countries observed.

== Economy ==
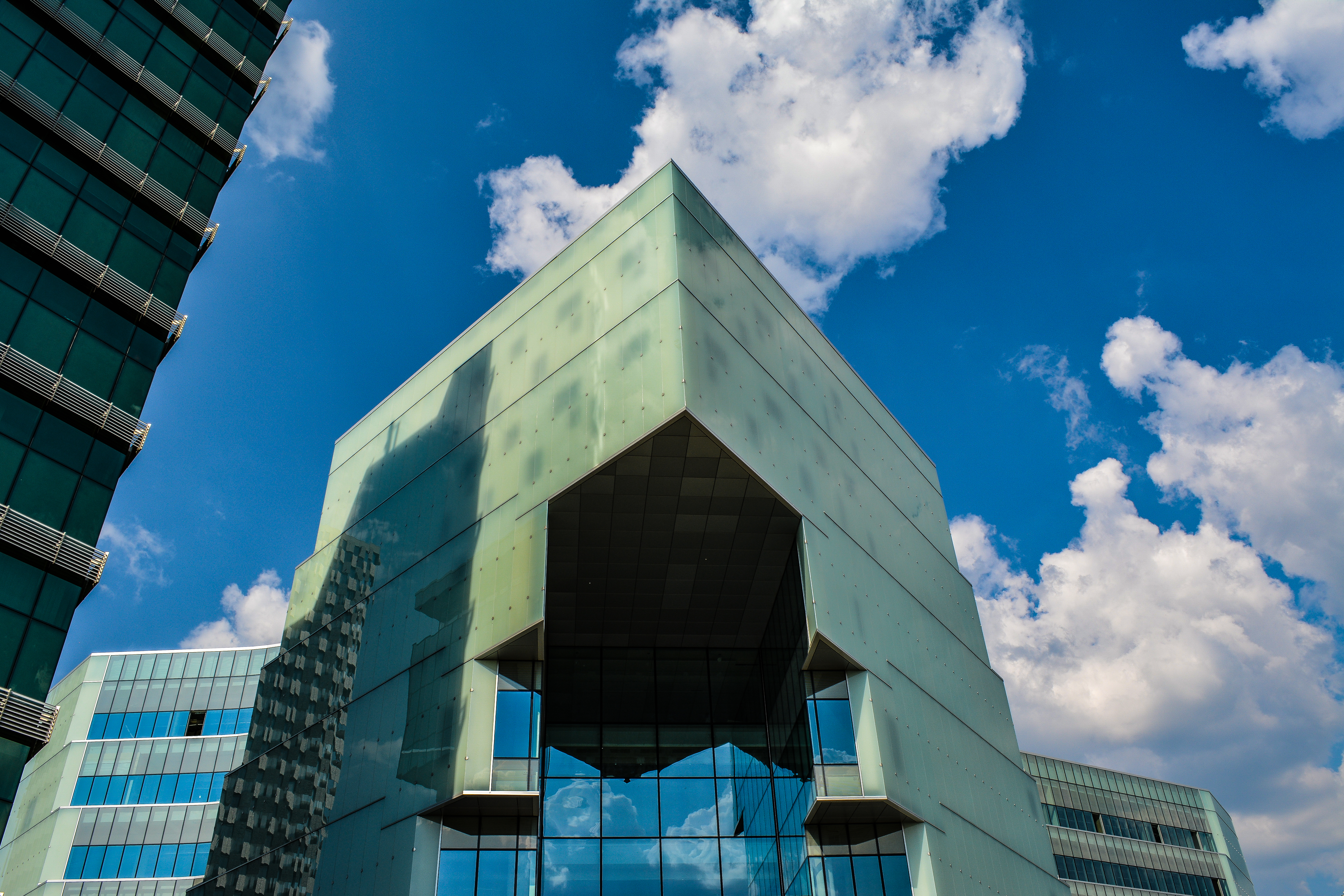
The metropolitan area of Durana, which encompasses the cities of Tirana and Durrës, functions as the principal economic hub of Albania.

Transitioning from a socialist planned to a capitalist mixed economy, Albania is classified as a developing open market with an upper-middle income status. The Albanian economy is characterised by a substantial service sector, comprising 48.6% of GDP, with key contributions from wholesale and retail trade, tourism, real estate, and logistics. Following this, the industrial sector accounts for 20.2%, particularly influenced by construction, while the agricultural sector, including forestry, and fisheries, represents 18.5%, and the manufacturing sector contributes a modest 6.3% to the economy. As of 2025, nominal gross domestic product (GDP) is $26.911 billion with a GDP per capita of $9,474. The projected annual percentage change in economic growth for 2025 is 3.8%, with a forecasted moderation to 3.5% by 2029.

Albania has developed a comprehensive framework for international trade through several pivotal agreements with various regions. The Stabilisation and Association Agreement with the EU, signed in 2006, is one of the most significant. This agreement provides critical trade benefits and serves as a foundation for integration into the EU. In 2009, Albania signed a free trade agreement with the European Free Trade Association, which further expands trade opportunities and market access. The country is a signatory to the Central European Free Trade Agreement and Organization of the Black Sea Economic Cooperation, promoting regional trade and collaboration with neighboring countries. Bilateral trade relations have increased with Turkey, the United Kingdom and the United States.

The 2023 Economic Freedom of the World report placed Albania in the 31st position, noting a considerable degree of economic independence and the effective adoption of market-oriented policies. The 2024 Bertelsmann Transformation Index ranked Albania 20th and acknowledged substantial progress in political and economic transformation. Also in 2024, the country was positioned 23rd in the Global Gender Gap Index, excelling in the Economic Participation and Opportunity category with a global ranking of 16th, showcasing significant advancements in women's economic participation.

The economy, despite demonstrating considerable resilience, encounters substantial vulnerabilities that hinder its development. Principal challenges include widespread corruption, distorted competition, and frequent modifications to fiscal legislation. Furthermore, inadequate contract enforcement, a large informal sector, and persistent labor shortages further complicate the national economic progress. The economic landscape is characterised by regional disparities, particularly apparent in the concentration of economic activities in the triangular region formed by Tirana, Durrës and Laç. This metropolitan area, referred to as Durana, functions as the principal economic center of Albania. In the year 2021, Tirana County accounted for a significant 44% of the national GDP, with the counties of Fier and Durrës also playing integral roles in the economy, contributing 11% and 10% to the GDP, respectively. Other substantial economic centers, such as Elbasan and the coastal cities of Sarandë and Vlorë, highlight the uneven distribution of economic development across the country. Cultural regions, including Berat and Korçë, despite their geographical distance from the primary economic hubs, have derived considerable benefits from the expansion of the tourism sector.

=== Primary sector ===
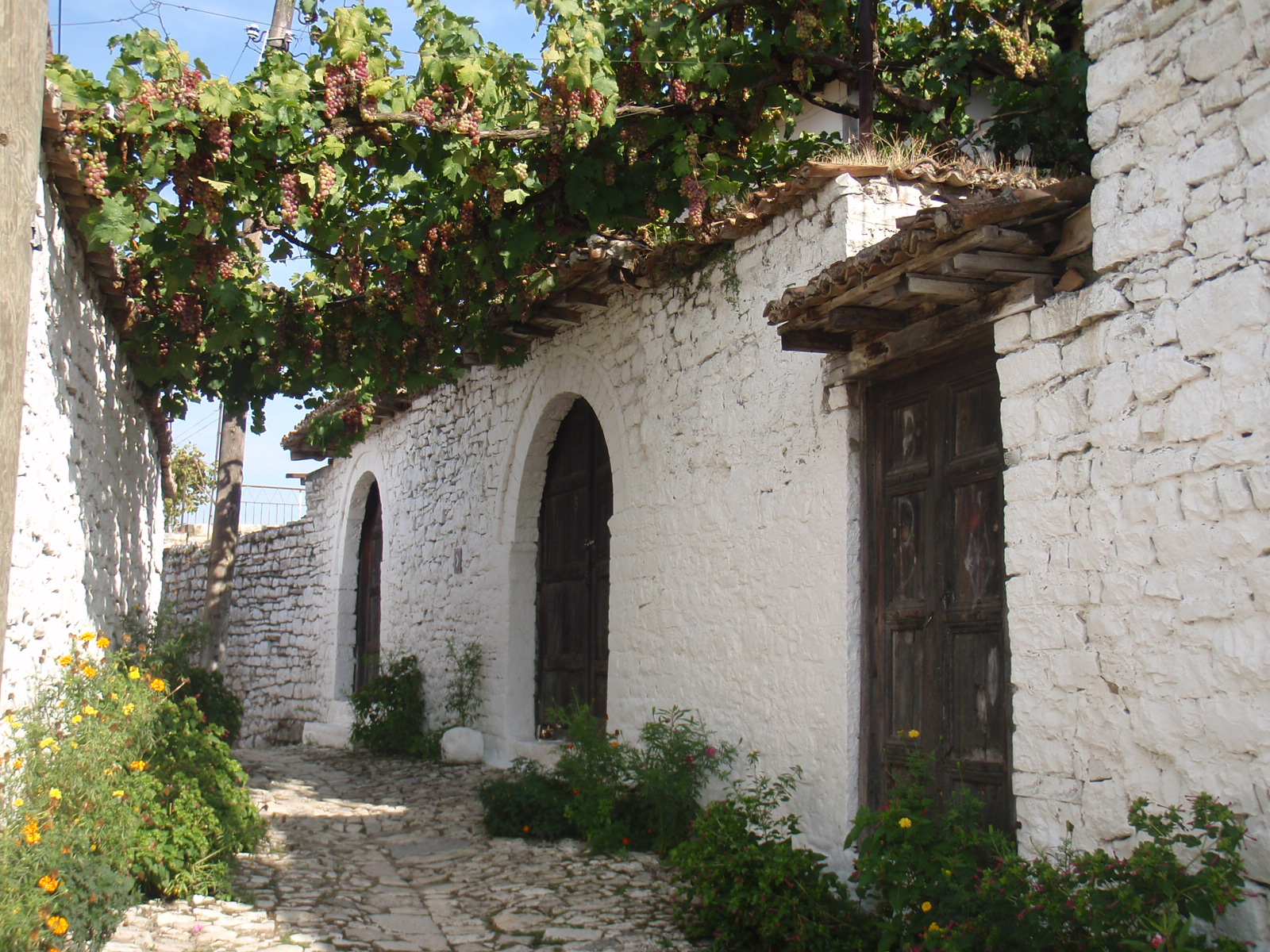
Grapes in Berat. Due to the Mediterranean climate, wine, olives and citrus fruits are mostly produced in Southern Albania.

Albania produces significant amounts of fruits (apples, olives, grapes, oranges, lemons, apricots, peaches, cherries, figs, sour cherries, plums, and strawberries), vegetables (potatoes, tomatoes, maize, onions, and wheat), sugar beets, tobacco, meat, honey, dairy products, traditional medicine and aromatic plants. The country is a worldwide significant producer of salvia, rosemary and yellow gentian. The proximity to the Ionian Sea and the Adriatic Sea give the underdeveloped fishing industry great potential. The World Bank and European Community economists report that the fishing industry has good potential to generate export earnings because prices in the nearby Greek and Italian markets are many times higher than those in the Albanian market. The seafood available off the coasts include carp, trout, sea bream, mussels and crustaceans.

Albania has one of Europe's longest histories of viticulture. Today's region was one of the few places where vine was naturally grown during the ice age. The oldest found seeds in the region are 4,000 to 6,000 years old. In 2009, the nation produced an estimated 17,500 tonnes of wine.

=== Secondary sector ===
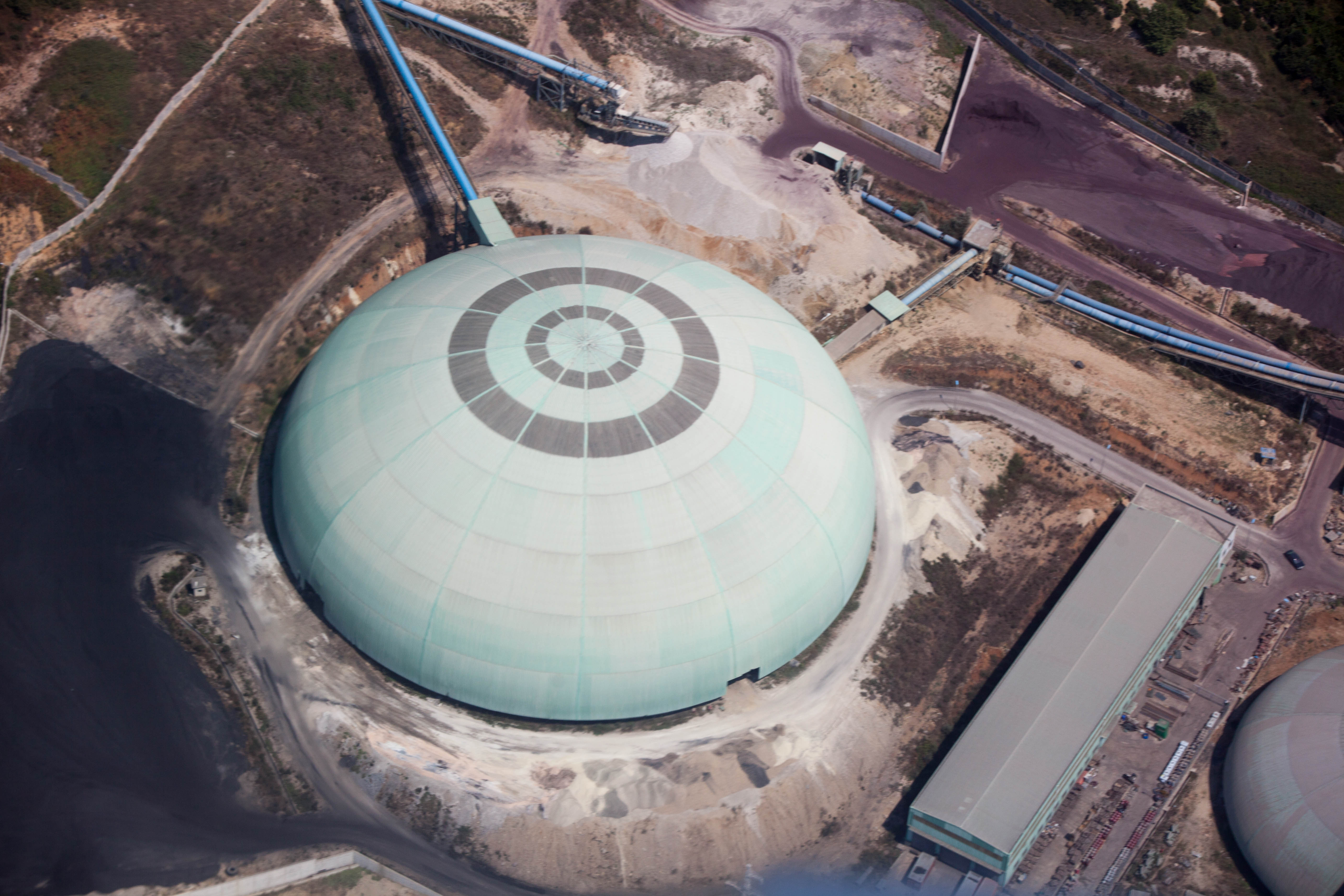
The Antea factory in Fushë-Krujë

The secondary sector has undergone many changes and diversification since the communist regime collapsed. It is diversified, from electronics, manufacturing, textiles, to food, cement, mining, and energy. The Antea Cement plant in Fushë-Krujë is considered one of the nation's largest industrial greenfield investments. Oil and gas are promising, albeit strictly regulated, sectors, with the second-largest oil deposits in the Balkans and the largest oil reserves in Europe. The Albpetrol company is owned by the state and monitors the state petroleum agreements. The textile industry has seen an extensive expansion by approaching companies from the EU. According to the Instituti i Statistikës (INSTAT), as of 2016, textile production had an annual growth of 5.3% and an annual turnover of around 1.5 billion euros.

Albania is a significant minerals producer and ranks among the world's leading chromium producers and exporters. The nation is also a notable producer of copper, nickel, and coal. The Batra mine, Bulqizë mine, and Thekna mine are among the most recognised mines still in operation.

=== Tertiary sector ===
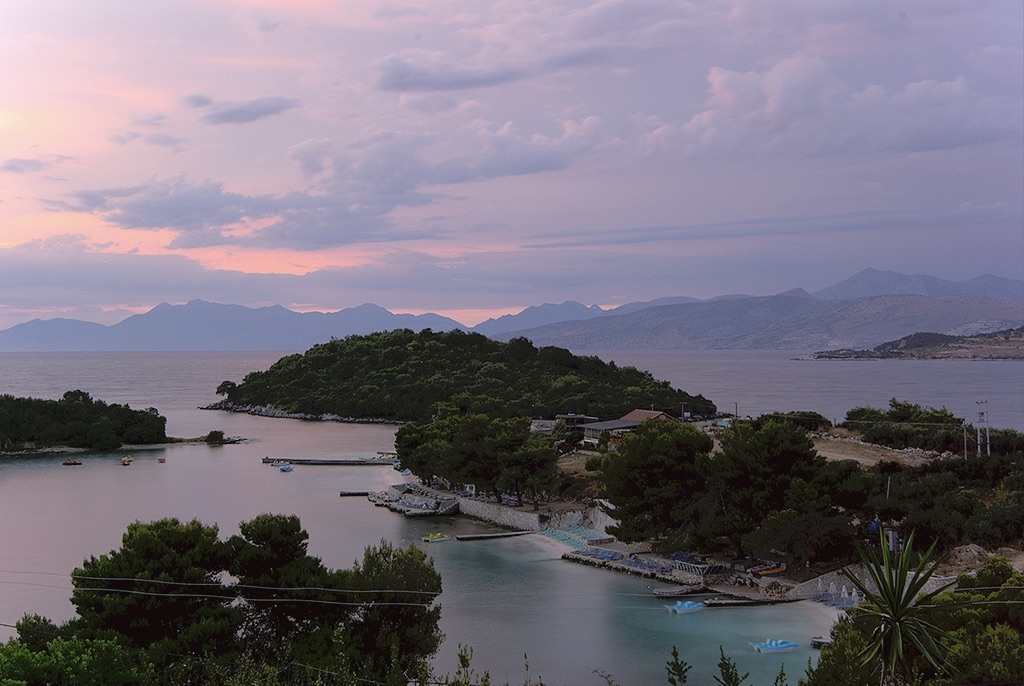
The Islets of Ksamil, in the south of the Albanian Ionian Sea Coast

The tertiary sector represents the fastest growing sector. 36% of the population work in the service sector which contributes to 65% of the GDP. Since the end of the 20th century, the banking industry is a major component of the tertiary sector and remains in good conditions overall due to privatisation and the commendable monetary policy.

Previously one of the most isolated and controlled countries in the world, telecommunication industry represents nowadays another major contributor to the sector. It developed largely through privatisation and subsequent investment by both domestic and foreign investors. Eagle, Vodafone and Telekom Albania are the leading telecommunications service providers.

Tourism is recognised as an industry of national importance and has been steadily increasing since the beginning of the 21st century. It directly accounted for 8.4% of GDP in 2016 though including indirect contributions pushes the proportion to 26%. In the same year, the country received approximately 4.74 million visitors mostly from across Europe and the United States as well.

The increase of foreign visitors has been dramatic. Albania had 500,000 visitors in 2005 and an estimated 4.2 million in 2012, an increase of 740 percent. According to UN Tourism, Albania welcomed approximately 11.7 million tourists in 2024, marking a significant increase from previous years. The bulk of the tourist industry is concentrated along the Adriatic and Ionian Sea. The Albanian Riviera in the southwest has the most scenic and pristine beaches; its coastline has a considerable length of 446 kilometres (277 miles). The coast has a distinctive character, rich in varieties of virgin beaches, capes, coves, covered bays, lagoons, small gravel beaches, sea caves, and many landforms. Some parts of this seaside are very clean ecologically, including unexplored areas, which are very rare within the Mediterranean. Other attractions include the mountainous areas such as the Albanian Alps, Ceraunian Mountains and Korab Mountains but also the historical cities of Berat, Durrës, Gjirokastër, Sarandë, Shkodër and Korçë.

=== Transport ===
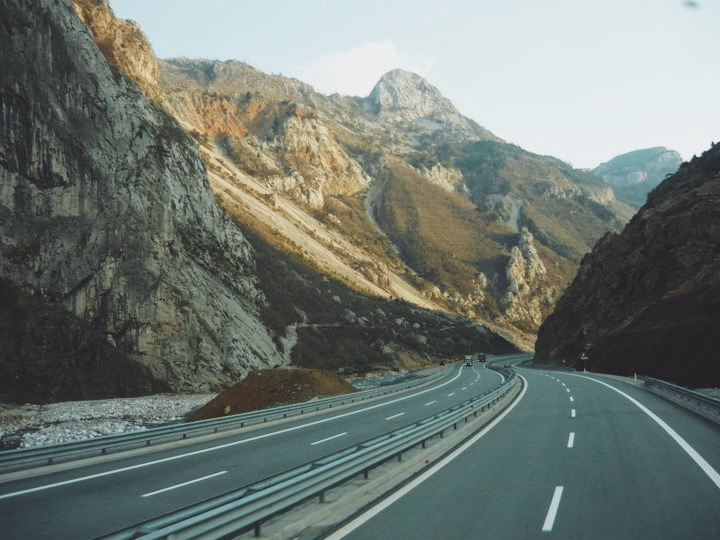
Rruga e Kombit connects the Adriatic Sea across the Western Lowlands with the Albanian Alps.

Transportation in Albania is managed within the functions of the Ministry of Infrastructure and Energy and entities such as the Albanian Road Authority, responsible for the construction and maintenance of the highways and motorways in Albania, as well as the Albanian Aviation Authority, with the responsibility of coordinating civil aviation and airports.

The Tirana International Airport is the premier air gateway to the country and is the principal hub for the national flag carrier airline, Air Albania. The airport carried more than 3.3 million passengers in 2019 with connections to many destinations in other countries around Europe, Africa and Asia. The country plans to progressively increase the number of airports especially in the south with possible locations in Sarandë, Gjirokastër and Vlorë.

The Autostrada 1 (A1) is an integral transportation corridor and the country's longest motorway. It is planned to link Durrës to Pristina, Kosovo with the Pan-European Corridor X in Serbia. The Autostrada 2 (A2) is part of the Adriatic–Ionian Corridor as well as the Pan-European Corridor VIII and connects Fier with Vlorë. The Autostrada 3 (A3) is under construction and after its completion will connect Tirana and Elbasan with the Pan-European Corridor VIII. When all three corridors are completed, Albania will have an estimated 759 kilometres (472 mi) of highway, linking it with all neighboring countries.

The Port of Durrës is the busiest and largest seaport, followed by Vlorë, Shëngjin and Sarandë. The rail network is administered by the national railway company Hekurudha Shqiptare. A new railway line from Tirana and its airport to Durrës is planned. The location of this railway, connecting the most populated urban areas, makes it an important economic development project.

=== Energy ===
Electricity production in Albania from 1980 to 2019

Albania has a wide variety of energy resources, ranging from gas, oil, and coal to wind, solar, water, and other renewable sources. According to the World Economic Forum's 2023 Energy Transition Index, the country ranked 21st globally, highlighting the progress in its energy transition agenda. The electricity generation sector depends on hydroelectricity, ranking fifth in the world. Increasing risks of river floods and droughts due to climate change is expected to put electricity generation at risk. The Drin hosts four hydroelectric power stations, including Fierza, Koman, Skavica and Vau i Dejës. Two other power stations, such as the Banjë and Moglicë, are along the Devoll in the south.

The main petroleum deposits are located around the Adriatic Sea Coast and Myzeqe Plain within the Western Lowlands, where the largest reserve is located. Patos-Marinza Oil Field is the largest onshore oil field in Europe. The Trans Adriatic Pipeline, part of the planned Southern Gas Corridor, runs for 215 kilometres (134 miles) across Albania before entering the Adriatic Sea Coast approximately 17 kilometres (11 miles) northwest of Fier.

Water resources are particularly abundant in all regions and comprise lakes, rivers, springs, and groundwater aquifers. The available average quantity of fresh water is estimated at 129.7 cubic metres (4,580 cubic feet) per inhabitant per year, one of the highest rates in Europe. According to data presented by the Joint Monitoring Programme for Water Supply and Sanitation in 2015, about 93% of the population had access to improved sanitation.

=== Media ===
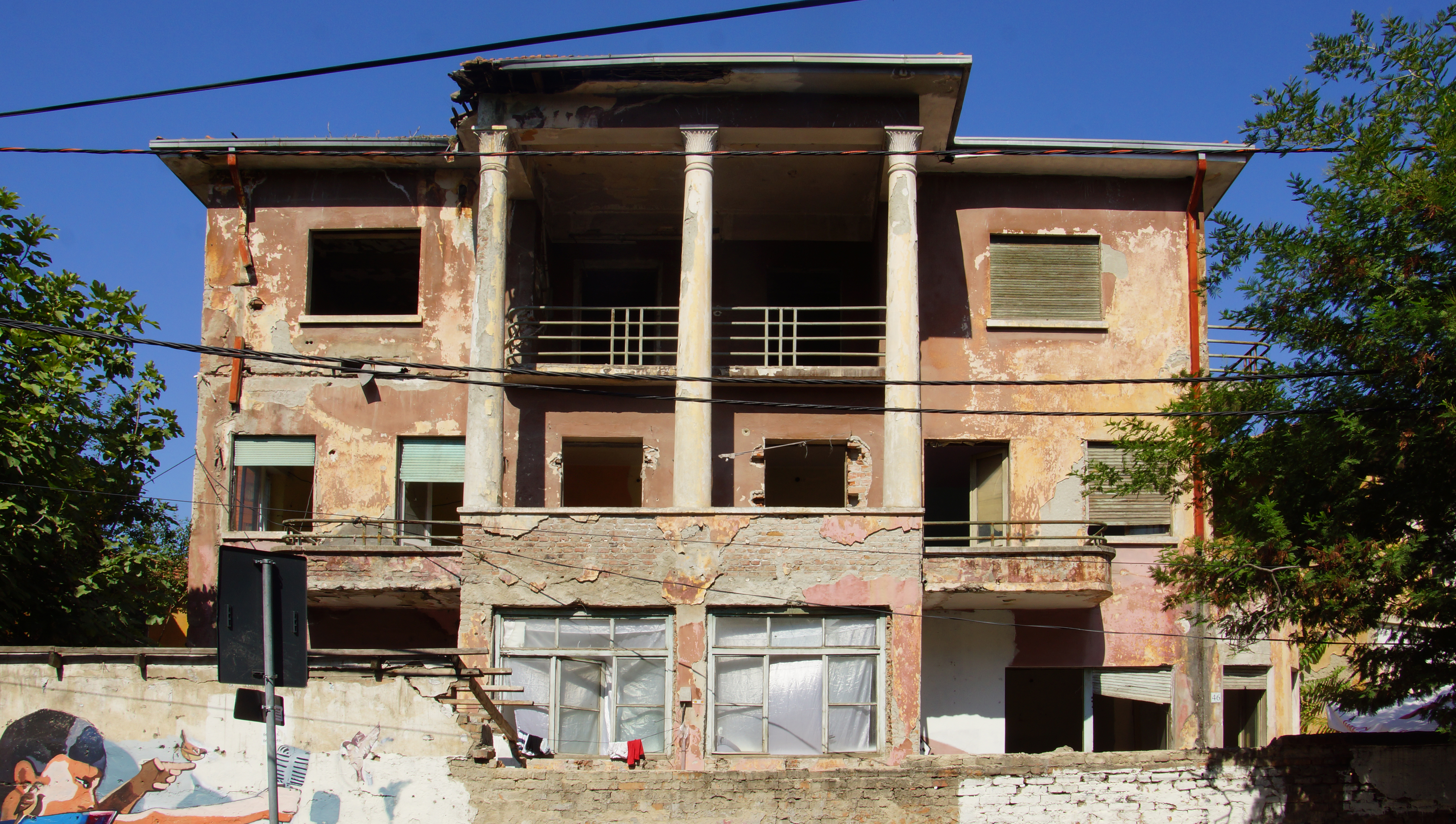
The former grounds of the headquarters of Radio Tirana in the capital of Tirana. Radio Televizioni Shqiptar (RTSH) was initially inaugurated as Radio Tirana in 1938 prior to World War II.

The freedom of press and speech and the right to free expression are guaranteed in the constitution. Albania was ranked 84th on the Press Freedom Index of 2020 compiled by the Reporters Without Borders, with its score steadily declining since 2003. Nevertheless, in the 2020 report of Freedom in the World, the Freedom House classified the freedoms of press and speech as partly free from political interference and manipulation.

Radio Televizioni Shqiptar is the national broadcaster corporation operating numerous television and radio stations. The three major private broadcaster corporations are Top Channel, Televizioni Klan and Vizion Plus whose content are distributed throughout Albania and beyond its territory in Kosovo and other Albanian-speaking territories.

Albanian cinema has its roots in the 20th century and developed after its declaration of independence. The first movie theater exclusively devoted to showing motion pictures was built in 1912 in Shkodër. During the People's Republic of Albania, cinema developed rapidly with the inauguration of the Kinostudio Shqipëria e Re in Tirana. In 1953, the Albanian-Soviet epic film The Great Warrior Skanderbeg was released chronicling the life and fight of the medieval hero Skanderbeg. It went on to win the international prize at the 1954 Cannes Film Festival. In 2003, the Tirana International Film Festival was established. The Durrës Amphitheatre is host to the Durrës International Film Festival.

=== Technology ===
After the fall of communism in 1991, human resources in sciences and technology have drastically decreased. As of various reports, during 1991 to 2005 approximately 50% of the professors and scientists of the universities and science institutions have left Albania. Albania was ranked 67th in the Global Innovation Index in 2025.

Telecommunication represents one of the fastest growing and dynamic sectors. Vodafone Albania, Telekom Albania and Albtelecom are the three large providers of mobile and internet. According to the Electronic and Postal Communications Authority in 2018, the country had approximately 2.7 million active mobile users with almost 1.8 million active broadband subscribers. Vodafone Albania served more than 931,000 mobile users, Telekom Albania had about 605,000 users, and Albtelecom had more than 272,000 users. In January 2023, Albania launched its first two satellites, Albania 1 and Albania 2, into orbit in what was regarded as a milestone effort in monitoring the country's territory and identifying illegal activities. Albanian-American engineer Mira Murati, the Chief Technology Officer of research organisation OpenAI, played a substantial role in the development and launch of artificial intelligence services such as ChatGPT, Codex and DALL-E. In December 2023, Prime Minister Edi Rama announced plans for collaboration between the Albanian government and ChatGPT, facilitated by discussions with Murati. Rama emphasised the intention to streamline the alignment of Albanian laws with the regulations of the European Union, aiming to reduce costs associated with translation and legal services.

== Demography ==
Development of the population of Albania over the last sixty years

The 2023 census conducted by the Instituti i Statistikave indicated a population of 2,402,113, with a notable decline from the 2,821,977 recorded in the 2011 census. The decrease in inhabitants began after the disintegration of the communist regime and is associated with significant shifts within the political, economic, and social structure. A principal factor in this transition incorporates a decline in fertility rates coupled with an increase in emigration, both contributing to persistent demographic changes and challenges. It is forecast that the population will continue shrinking for the next decade at least, depending on the actual rates and the level of migration. The population density is 83.6 inhabitants per square kilometer with a varied distribution of inhabitants across different regions. The counties of Tirana and Durrës showcase substantial concentrations of people, accounting for about 41% of the overall demographic, with 32% residing in Tirana and 9% in Durrës. Conversely, more peripheral and rural counties such as Gjirokastër and Kukës present significantly lower population densities, with each aiding 3% to the overall population.

Historically, the Albanian people have established several communities in many regions throughout Southern Europe. The Albanian diaspora has been formed since the late Middle Ages, when they emigrated to escape either various socio-political difficulties or the Ottoman conquest. Following the fall of communism, large numbers of Albanians have migrated to countries such as Australia, Canada, Switzerland, the United Kingdom and the United States. Albanian minorities are present in the neighbouring territories such as the west of North Macedonia, the southeast of Montenegro, Kosovo in its entirety and parts of southern Serbia. Altogether, the number of ethnic Albanians living abroad is estimated to be higher than the total population inside Albania. As much as a third of those born in the country's borders now live outside of it, making Albania one of the countries with the highest rate of outmigration relative to its population in the world. In 2022 the birth rate was 20% lower than in 2021, largely due to emigration of people of childbearing age.

=== Urbanisation ===
Subsequent to the collapse of communism in 1991, Albania has undergone a remarkable transformation in its urban landscape, emerging as one of the fastest urbanising countries in Europe. At the forefront of this transformation is the Tirana–Durrës agglomeration, a densely populated urban corridor along the west coast. This corridor has become the primary locus of population growth and settlement development, attracting a significant influx of internal migrants from peripheral areas. Despite an overall decline of total population, the proportion of the urban demographic has consistently progressed from 47% in 2001 to 65% in 2023. This sustained increase, coupled with the concentration in the Tirana-Durrës region, has led to a spread of regional imbalances, with the peripheral areas, particularly Dibër and Kukës, experiencing severe depopulation.

Largest cities and towns in Albania According to the 2011 census conducted by Instituti i Statistikave (INSTAT) (Note: The population figures for each city or town are available in the relevant reference sources for their respective county:)
Rank	Name	County	Pop.	Rank	Name	County	Pop.
1	Tirana	Tirana	418,495	11	Kavajë	Tirana	20,192
2	Durrës	Durrës	113,249	12	Gjirokastër	Gjirokastër	19,836
3	Vlorë	Vlorë	79,513	13	Sarandë	Vlorë	17,233
4	Elbasan	Elbasan	78,703	14	Laç	Lezhë	17,086
5	Shkodër	Shkodër	77,075	15	Kukës	Kukës	16,719
6	Fier	Fier	55,845	16	Patos	Fier	15,937
7	Korçë	Korçë	51,152	17	Lezhë	Lezhë	15,510
8	Berat	Berat	32,606	18	Peshkopi	Dibër	13,251
9	Lushnjë	Fier	31,105	19	Kuçovë	Berat	12,654
10	Pogradec	Korçë	20,848	20	Krujë	Durrës	11,721

=== Language ===
Languages spoken at home as of 2023:
1. Albanian (91.1%)
2. Other language (1.54%)
3. Multiple languages (0.57%)
4. No answer (1.21%)
5. Unavailable (5.59%)

The official language of the country is Albanian, which is spoken by the vast majority of Albania's citizens. Its standard spoken and written form is revised and merged from the two main dialects, Gheg and Tosk, though it is notably based more on the Tosk dialect. The Shkumbin river is the rough dividing line between the two dialects. Among minority languages, Greek is the second most-spoken language in the country, with 0.5 to 3% of the population speaking it as first language, mainly in the country's south where its speakers are concentrated. Other languages spoken by ethnic minorities in Albania include Aromanian, Serbo-Croatian, Macedonian, Bulgarian, Gorani, and Roma. Macedonian is official in the Pustec Municipality in East Albania. In the 2023 population census, 91.07% reported Albanian as the language spoken at home. 1.54% declared to speak at home another language, 0.57% multiple languages, 1.21% gave no answer and 5.59% were unavailable.

Among young people aged 25 or less, English, German and Turkish have seen rising interest after 2000. Italian and French have had a stable interest, while Greek has lost much of its previous interest. The trends are linked with cultural and economic factors.

In the mid-2010s, an increasing number of Albanians showed interest in learning the German language, which has been explained as part of "a Western Balkan trend of preparing to integrate into the German labor market". Some of them have gone to Germany for studies or work. Albania and Germany have agreements for cooperating in helping young people of the two countries know both cultures better. Due to a sharp rise in economic relations with Turkey, interest in learning Turkish, in particular among young people, was also growing on a yearly basis in the 2010s.

=== Minorities ===
Ethnic groups as of 2023:
1. Albanians (91.0%)
2. Greeks (0.98%)
3. Balkan Egyptians (0.50%)
4. Roma (0.40%)
5. Bulgarians (0.29%)
6. Bosnians (0.12%)
7. Aromanians (0.10%)
8. Macedonians (0.09%)
9. Serbs (0.02%)
10. Montenegrins (0.02%)
11. Mixed ethnicity (0.03%)
12. Other ethnicity (0.15%)
13. Unspecified (6.20%)

Designated national and cultural minorities in Albania include Aromanian, Greek, Macedonian, Montenegrin, Serb, Roma, Egyptian, Bosnian and Bulgarian peoples, as well as Gorani and Jews as other minority groups. The 2023 census recorded the ethnic composition as Albanians 2,186,917 (91,04% of the total), Greeks 23,485 (0,98%), Macedonians 2,281 (0,09%), Montenegrins 511 (0,02%), Aromanians 2,459 (0,1%), Roma 9,813 (0.4%), Balkan Egyptians 12,375 (0,5%), Bosnians 2,963 (0,12%), Serbians 584 (0,02%), Bulgarians 7,057 (0,29%), mixed ethnicities 770 (0.03%), other ethnicities 3,798 (0.15%), and 134,451 (5.60%) with unspecified ethnicity, out of a total population of 2,402,113.

=== Religion ===
Religion as of 2023:
1. Islam (45.9%)
2. Bektashi (4.81%)
3. Roman Catholicism (8.38%)
4. Eastern Orthodoxy (7.22%)
5. Evangelicalism (0.40%)
6. Non-affiliated believers (13.8%)
7. Atheism (3.55%)
8. Undeclared (15.8%)
9. Other (0.15%)

Albania is a secular and religiously diverse country with no official religion. Freedom of religion, belief and conscience are guaranteed under the constitution. As of the 2023 census, there were 1,101,718 (45.86%) Sunni Muslims, 201,530 (8.38%) Catholics, 173,645 (7.22%) Eastern Orthodox, 115,644 (4.81%) Bektashi Muslims, 9,658 (0.4%) Evangelicals, 3,670 (0.15%) of other religions, 332,155 (13.82%) believers without religion or denomination, 85,311 (3.55%) Atheists and 378,782 (15.76%) did not provide an answer. Albania is nevertheless ranked among the least religious countries in the world. Religion constitute an important role in the lives of only 39% of the population. In another report, 56% considered themselves religious, 30% considered themselves non-religious, while 9% defined themselves as convinced atheists. 80% believed in God.

The Muslim Albanians are spread throughout the country. Orthodox and Bektashis are mostly found in the south, whereas Catholics mainly live in the north. In 2008, there were 694 Catholic churches and 425 Orthodox churches, 568 mosques and 70 bektashi takyas in the country.

During modern times, the republican, monarchic and later communist regimes followed a systematic policy of separating religion from official functions and cultural life. The country has never had an official religion either as a republic or as a kingdom. In the 20th century, the clergy of all faiths was weakened under the monarchy and ultimately eradicated during the 1950s and 1960s, under the state policy of obliterating all organised religion from the territories of Albania. The communist regime persecuted and suppressed religious observance and institutions and entirely banned religion. The country was then officially declared to be the world's first atheist state. Religious freedom has returned, however, since the end of communism.

Islam survived communist era persecution and reemerged in the modern era as a practised religion. Some smaller Christian sects include Evangelicals and several Protestant communities including Seventh-day Adventist Church, Church of Jesus Christ of Latter-day Saints and Jehovah's Witnesses. The first recorded Protestant of Albania was Said Toptani, who travelled around Europe and returned to Tirana in 1853, where he preached Protestantism. The first evangelical Protestants appeared in the 19th century and the Evangelical Alliance was founded in 1892. Nowadays, it has 160 member congregations from different Protestant denominations. Following mass emigration to Israel after the fall of communism, there are only 200 Jews in Albania.

=== Education ===
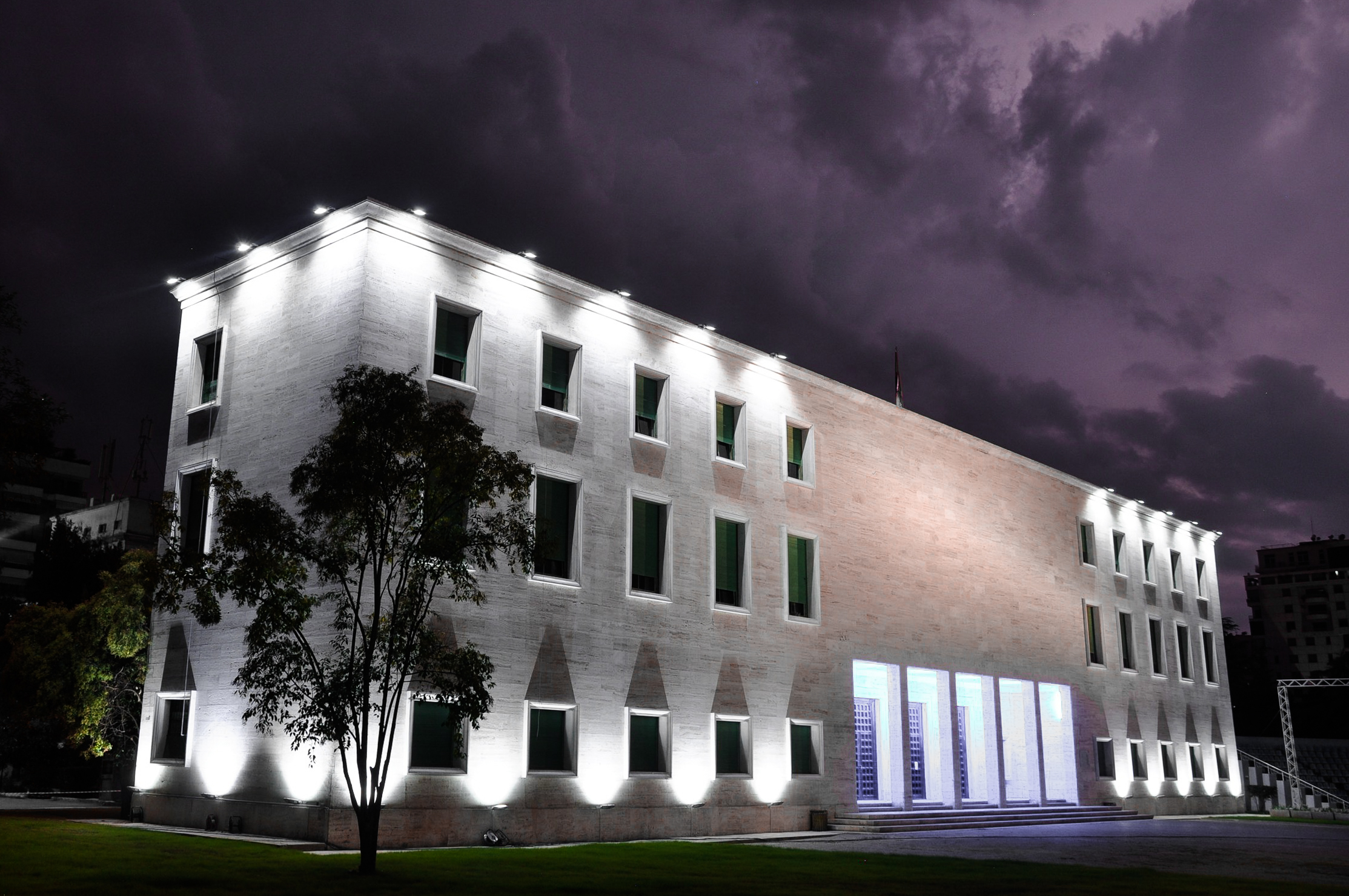
The University of Arts is the largest higher education institute dedicated to the study of arts.

Education is secular, free, compulsory, and based on three levels. The academic year is apportioned into two semesters, beginning in September or October and ending in June or July. Albanian is the primary language of instruction in the country's academic institutions. The study of a first foreign language is mandatory and taught most often at elementary and bilingual schools. Languages taught in schools are English, Italian, French and German. The school life expectancy is 16 years and literacy rate is 98.7%, with 99.2% for men and 98.3% for women.

Compulsory primary education is divided into two levels, elementary and secondary school, from grade one to five and six to nine, respectively. Pupils are required to attend school from the age six until they turn 16. Upon successful completion of primary education, all pupils are entitled to attend high schools, specialising in any field, including arts, sports, languages, sciences, and technology.

Tertiary education is optional and has undergone a thorough reformation and restructuring in compliance with the principles of the Bologna Process. There are a significant number of private and public institutions of higher education in the major cities. Tertiary education is organised into three successive levels, the bachelor, master, and doctorate.

=== Health ===
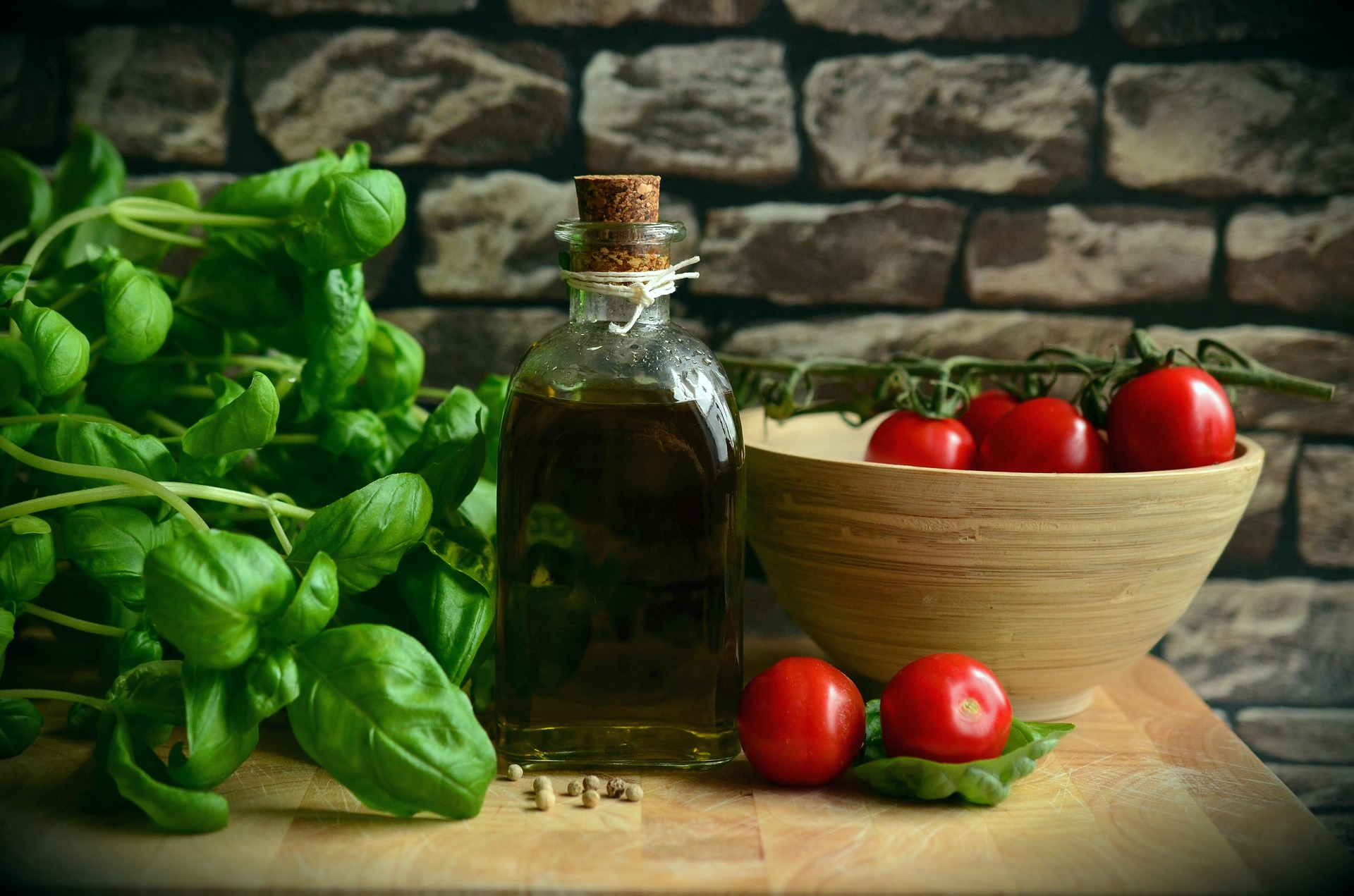
The Albanian cuisine from the Mediterranean, which is characterised by the use of fruits, vegetables and olive oil, contributes to the good nutrition of the country's population.

The constitution guarantees its citizens equal, free, and universal health care. The health care system is organised into primary, secondary, and tertiary healthcare, and is in a process of modernisation and development. The life expectancy at birth is 77.8 years, ranking 37th in the world and surpassing several developed countries. The average healthy life expectancy is 68.8 years, ranking 37th in the world. The infant mortality rate was estimated at 12 per 1,000 live births in 2015. In 2000, the country had the world's 55th-best healthcare performance, as defined by the World Health Organisation.

Cardiovascular disease is the principal cause of death, accounting for 52% of deaths. Accidents, injuries, malignant and respiratory diseases are other primary causes of death. Neuropsychiatric disease has also increased due to recent demographic, social, and economic changes.

In 2009, Albania had a fruit and vegetable supply of 886 grams per capita per day, the fifth-highest supply in Europe. Compared to other developed and developing countries, Albania has a relatively low rate of obesity, probably thanks to the Mediterranean diet. According to 2016 WHO data, 21.7% of adults in the country are clinically overweight, with a Body mass index (BMI) score of 25 or more.

== Culture ==
=== Symbols ===
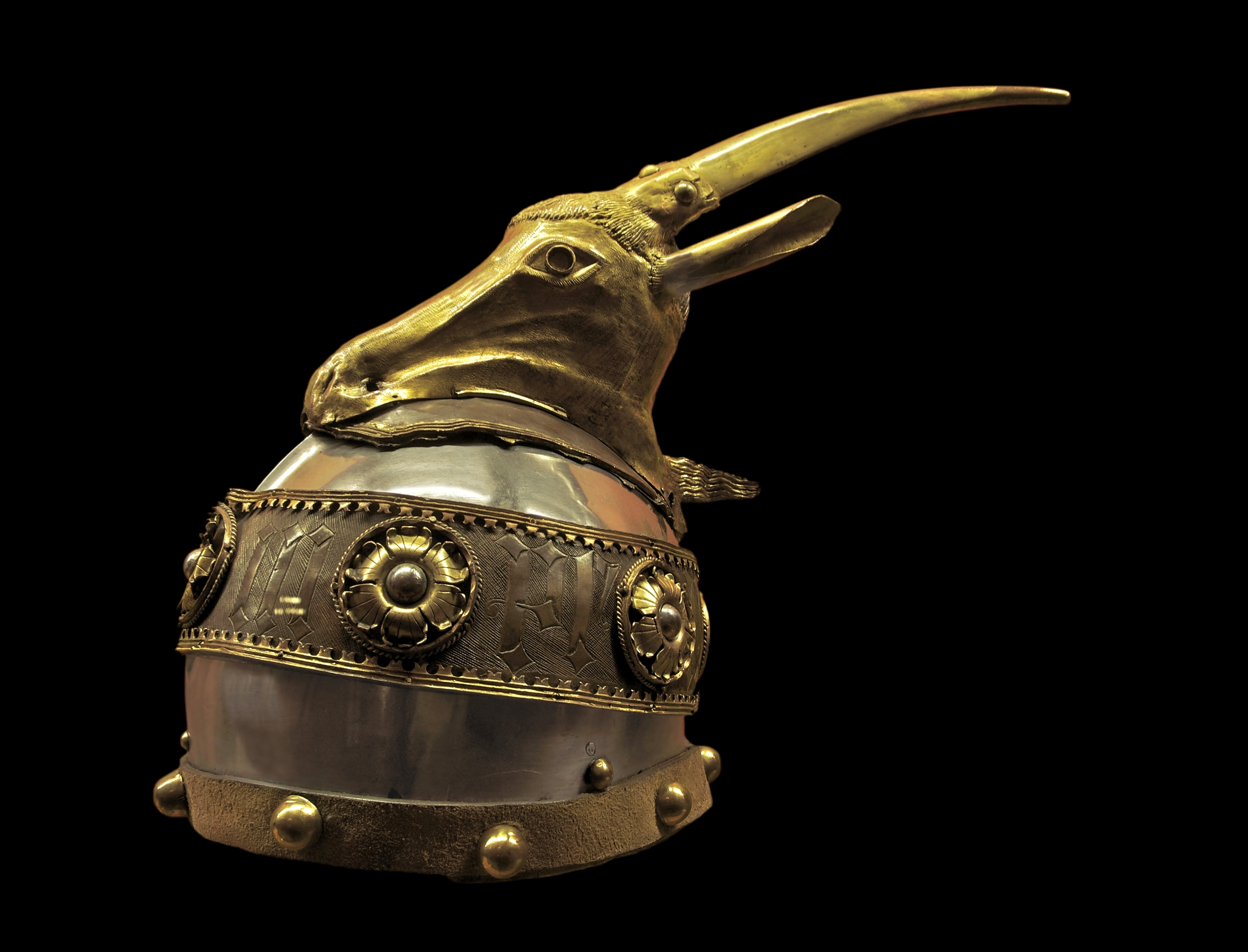
The helmet of Gjergj Kastrioti Skanderbeg stands as an emblem of Albanian independence.

The red and black national colours are displayed on the flag of Albania that is adorned with a double-headed eagle as the foremost recognised national symbol of Albania. With the black eagle portraying bravery and strength, the red field symbolises the fortitude and sacrifices of the Albanian people. The eagle is linked with the legacy of the national hero Skanderbeg. Rooted in the Middle Ages, it emerged as a heraldic symbol in the Principality of Arbër and among notable Albanian dynasties such as the Dukagjini, Kastrioti, Muzaka and Thopia clans. Amid the Albanian Renaissance, marking the resurgence of Albanian national identity and aspirations for independence, the Albanian eagle regained its prominence. Its importance reached its culmination with Albania's declaration of independence in 1912, when Ismail Qemali raised it as the national flag in Vlorë.

The coat of arms of Albania is an adaptation of the flag of Albania and the seal of Skanderbeg. The coat comprises the black double-headed eagle positioned at the centre of a red field. Above the eagle, it carries the helmet of Skanderbeg that is crowned with the head of a golden horned goat. Ti Shqipëri, më jep nder, më jep emrin Shqipëtar, which translates to "You Albania, give me honour, give me the name Albanian", is the national motto of Albania. It finds its foundation in the legacy of national poet Naim Frashëri, who held a renowned role during the Albanian Renaissance. The national anthem of Albania, "Himni i Flamurit", was composed by Asdreni and adopted as such following Albania's independence in 1912.

=== Clothing ===
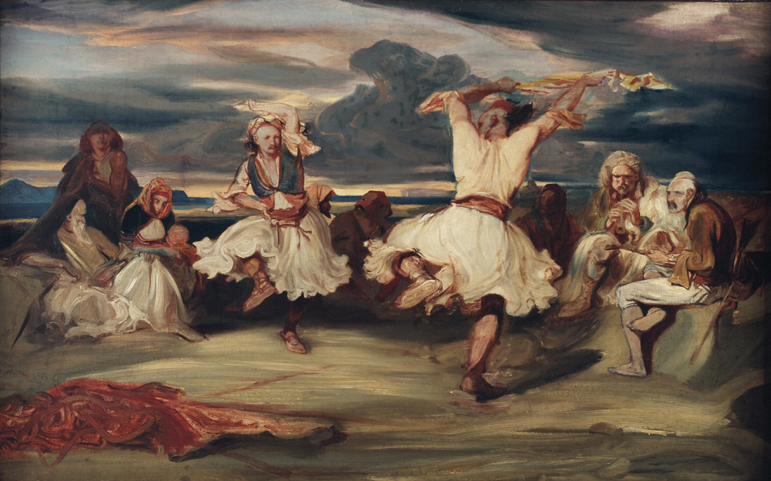
The Fustanella is designated as the national costume of Albania with profound cultural significance within Albanian culture.

Albanian traditional clothing, with its contrasting variations for the northern Gheg and southern Tosk Albanians, is a testament to Albania's history, cultural diversity and ethnic identity. Gheg men wear a light-colored shirt paired with wide loose-fitting trousers referred to as the Tirq. These trousers are securely fastened by a wide woven belt, the Brez. An integral component of their costume is the xhamadan, a woolen red velvet vest adorned with folkloric motifs and gold patterns. They also wear a distinctive dome-shaped hat known as the qeleshe, crafted from wool, with its origins tracing back to the Illyrians. Conversely, Tosk men opt for the fustanella, a knee-length garment designated as the national costume, typically white with pleats, accompanied by a white shirt. They also wear a beige or dark blue xhamadan reminiscent of the Gheg attire. To complete their attire, men wear knee-high socks referred to as çorape and leather shoes known as opinga.

The attire of Gheg and Tosk women is known for its rich palette of colors and intricate filigree detailing, displayed across various components including ear ornaments, finger rings, necklaces, belt buckles and buttons. Key components include a long, light-toned shirt paired with an apron, often accompanied by a woolen or felt mantle referred to as the xhoka. Additional upper garments, such as the dollama or mintan, may be layered, along with a headscarf known as kapica or shall. A distinctive variation incorporates a pair of aprons, including the pështjellak at the rear and the paranik at the front. Integral to the traditional attire of Gheg women is the ancient xhubleta. Dedicated efforts have been undertaken to preserve and promote the dress, acknowledging its significance as an emblem of Albanian heritage. As a testament to its importance, the xhubleta has been inscribed on the UNESCO Intangible Cultural Heritage List. The distinctive bell-shaped garment is fashioned in black and enriched with embroidered ethnic Albanian motifs, showcasing the remarkable craftsmanship of northern Albania. Its crafting process involves multiple intricate stages, encompassing the preparation of shajak fabric and the precise cutting techniques.

=== Arts ===
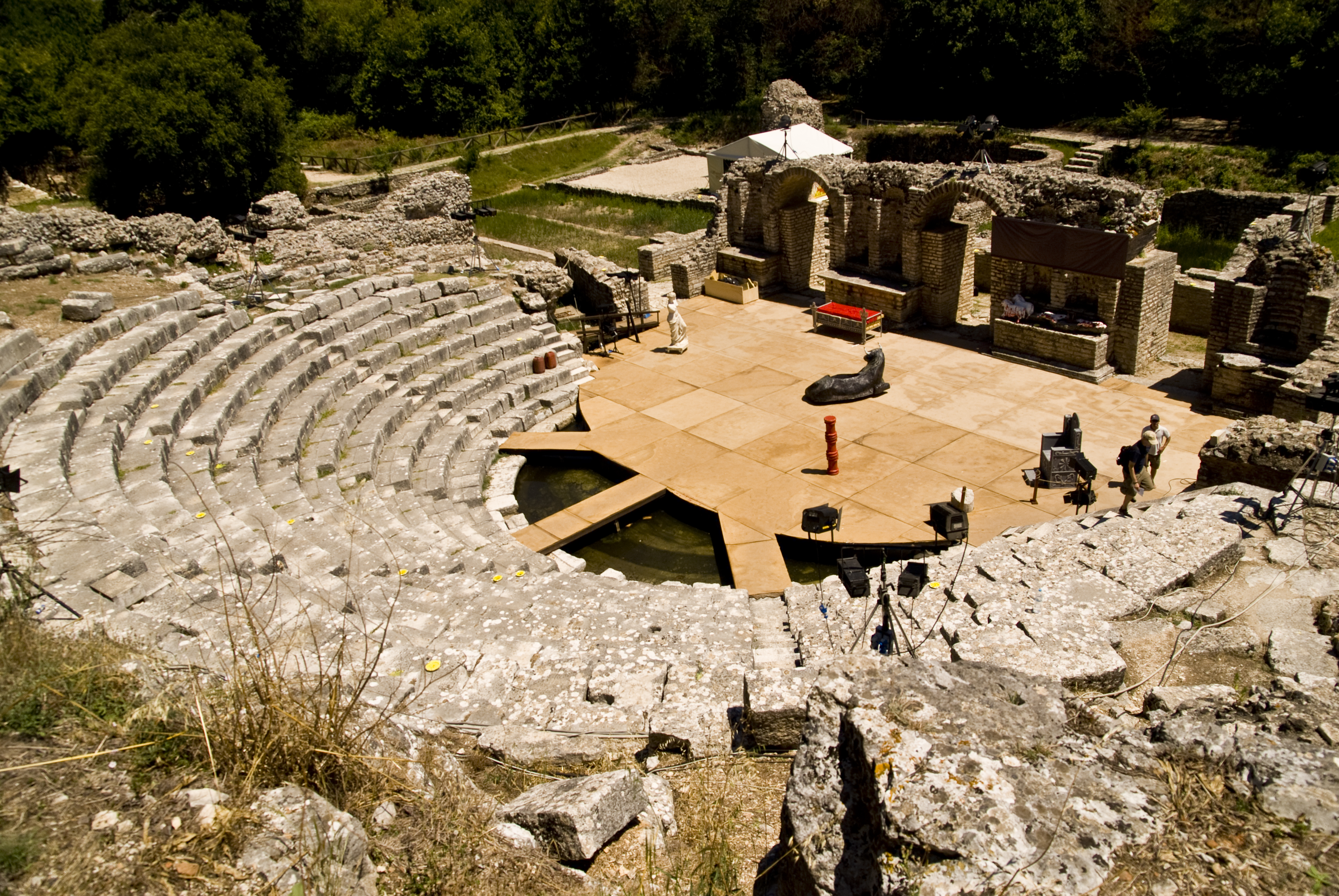
Butrint has been included in the UNESCO list of World Heritage Sites since 1992.

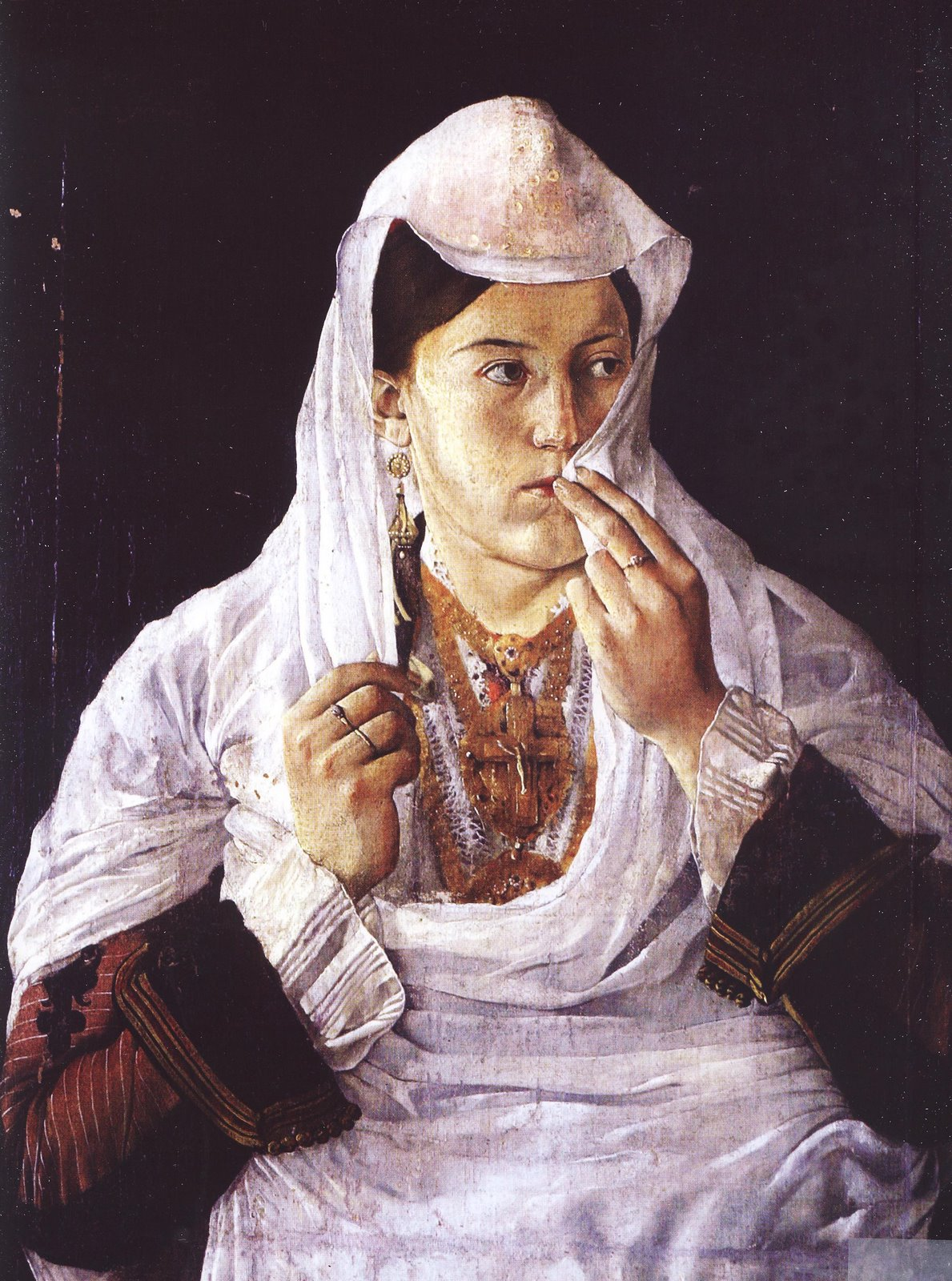
dMotra Tone by Kolë Idromeno.

The artistic history of Albania has been particularly influenced by a multitude of ancient and medieval people, traditions and religions. It covers a broad spectrum with mediums and disciplines that include painting, pottery, sculpture, ceramics and architecture all of them exemplifying a great variety in style and shape, in different regions and period.

The rise of the Byzantine and Ottoman Empire in the Middle Ages was accompanied by a corresponding growth in Christian and Islamic art in the lands of Albania which are apparent in examples of architecture and mosaics throughout the country. Centuries later, the Albanian Renaissance proved crucial to the emancipation of the modern Albanian culture and saw unprecedented developments in all fields of literature and art whereas artists sought to return to the ideals of Impressionism and Romanticism. Artists include Onufri, Kolë Idromeno, David Selenica, Kostandin Shpataraku and the Zografi Brothers.

The architecture of Albania reflects the legacy of various civilisations tracing back to the classical antiquity. Major cities have evolved from within the castle to include dwellings, religious and commercial structures, with constant redesigning of town squares and evolution of building techniques. Nowadays, the cities and towns reflect a whole spectrum of various architectural styles. In the 20th century, many historical as well as sacred buildings bearing the ancient influence were demolished during the communist era.

Ancient architecture is found throughout Albania and most visible in Byllis, Amantia, Phoenice, Apollonia, Butrint, Antigonia, Shkodër and Durrës. Considering the long period of rule of the Byzantine Empire, they introduced castles, citadels, churches and monasteries with spectacular wealth of visible murals and frescos. Perhaps the best known examples can be found in the southern Albanian cities and surroundings of Korçë, Berat, Voskopojë and Gjirokastër. Involving the introduction of Ottoman architecture there was a development of mosques and other Islamic buildings, particularly seen in Berat and Gjirokastër.

A productive period of Historicism, Art Nouveau and Neoclassicism merged into the 19th century, best exemplified in Korçë. The 20th century brought new architectural styles such as the modern Italian style, which is present in Tirana such as the Skanderbeg Square and Ministries. It is also present in Shkodër, Vlorë, Sarandë and Durrës. Moreover, other towns received their present-day Albania-unique appearance through various cultural or economic influences.

Socialist classicism arrived during the communist era. Many socialist-styled complexes, wide roads and factories were constructed, while town squares were redesigned and numerous of historic and important buildings demolished. Notable examples of that style include the Mother Teresa Square, Pyramid of Tirana, and Palace of Congresses.

Three archaeological sites are included in the list of UNESCO World Heritage Sites. These include the ancient remains of Butrint, the medieval Historic Centres of Berat and Gjirokastër, and Natural and Cultural Heritage of the Ohrid region site shared with North Macedonia since 2019. Furthermore, the royal Illyrian tombs, the remains of Apollonia, the ancient Amphitheatre of Durrës and the Fortress of Bashtovë has been included on the tentative list.

=== Music ===
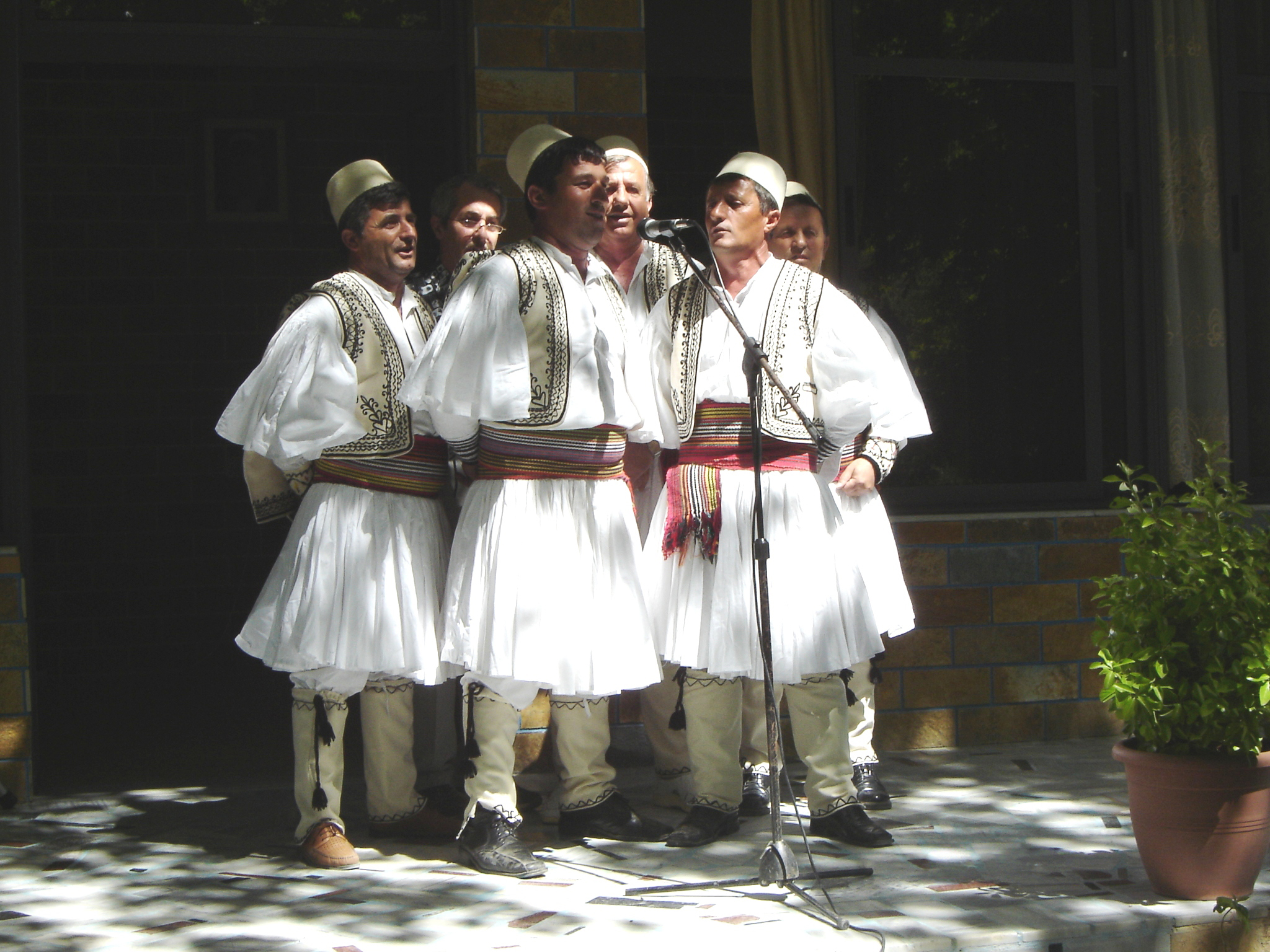
Albanian iso-polyphony is designated as an UNESCO Masterpiece of the Oral and Intangible Heritage of Humanity.

Albanian folk music is a prominent part of the national identity, and continues to play a major part in overall Albanian music. Folk music can be divided into two stylistic groups, mainly the northern Gheg varieties, and southern Lab and Tosk varieties. Northern and southern traditions are contrasted by a rugged tone from the north, and the more relaxed southern form of music.

Many songs concern events from Albanian history and culture, including traditional themes of honour, hospitality, treachery, and revenge. The first compilation of folk music was made by two Himariot musicians, Neço Muka and Koço Çakali, in Paris, during their work with Albanian soprano Tefta Tashko-Koço. Several gramophone compilations were recorded at the time by the three artists, which eventually led to the recognition of Albanian iso-polyphony as a UNESCO Intangible Cultural Heritage.

Festivali i Këngës is a traditional song contest organised by the national broadcaster Radio Televizioni Shqiptar. The festival is celebrated annually since its inauguration in 1962 and has launched the careers of some of Albania's most successful singers including Vaçe Zela and Parashqevi Simaku. It is significantly a music competition among performers presenting unreleased songs in premiere, composed by Albanian authors and voted by juries or by public.

Contemporary artists Rita Ora, Bebe Rexha, Era Istrefi, Dua Lipa, Ava Max, Bleona, Elvana Gjata, Ermonela Jaho, and Inva Mula have achieved international recognition for their music, while soprano Ermonela Jaho has been described by some as the "world's most acclaimed soprano". Opera singer Saimir Pirgu was nominated for the 2017 Grammy Award.

=== Literature ===
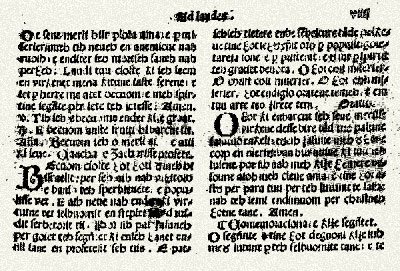
An excerpt from the Meshari (The Missal) written by Gjon Buzuku (1555)

The cultural renaissance was first of all expressed through the development of the Albanian language in the area of church texts and publications. The Protestant reforms invigorated hopes for the development of the local language and literary tradition, when cleric Gjon Buzuku translated the Catholic liturgy into Albanian, trying to do for Albanian what Martin Luther had done for German. Meshari (The Missal) written by Gjon Buzuku was published in 1555 and is considered one of the first literary works of written Albanian during the Middle Ages. The refined level of the language and the stabilised orthography must be the result of an earlier tradition of written Albanian, a tradition that is not well understood. However, there is some fragmented evidence, pre-dating Buzuku, which indicates that Albanian was written from at least the 14th century.

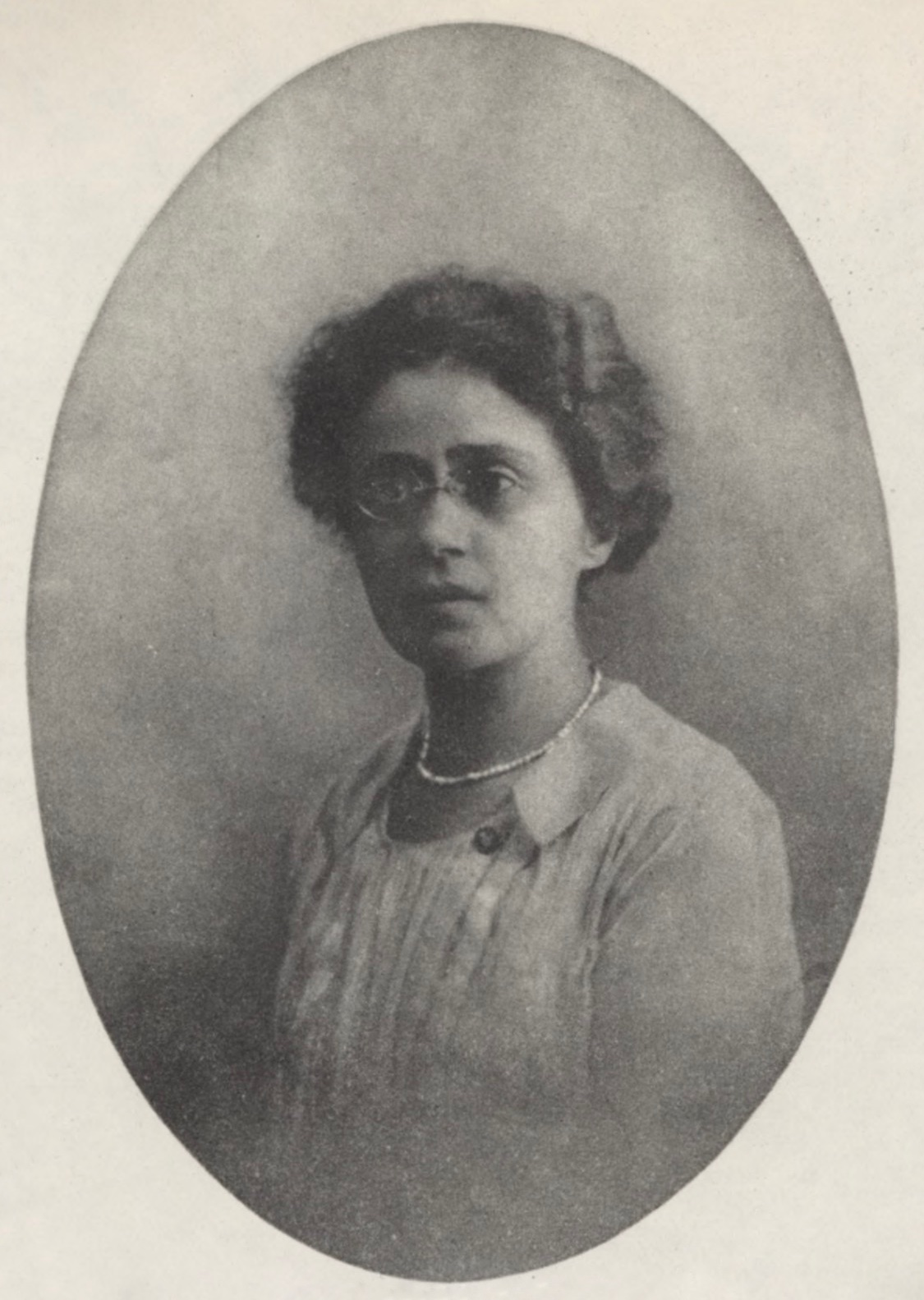
Parashqevi Qiriazi – teacher and feminist (1880–1970)

Albanian writings from these centuries must not have been religious texts only, but historical chronicles too. They are mentioned by the humanist Marin Barleti, who in his book Siege of Shkodër (Rrethimi i Shkodrës) from 1504, confirms that he leafed through such chronicles written in the language of the people (in vernacula lingua) as well as his famous biography of Skanderbeg Historia de vita et gestis Scanderbegi Epirotarum principis (History of Skanderbeg) from 1508. The History of Skanderbeg is still the foundation of Skanderbeg studies and is considered an Albanian cultural treasure, vital to the formation of Albanian national self-consciousness.

During the 16th and the 17th centuries, the catechism (E mbësuame krishterë) (Christian Teachings) from 1592 written by Lekë Matrënga, (Doktrina e krishterë) (The Christian Doctrine) from 1618 and (Rituale romanum) 1621 by Pjetër Budi, the first writer of original Albanian prose and poetry, an apology for George Castriot (1636) by Frang Bardhi, who also published a dictionary and folklore creations, the theological-philosophical treaty Cuneus Prophetarum (The Band of Prophets) (1685) by Pjetër Bogdani, the most universal personality of Albanian Middle Ages, were published in Albanian. The most famous Albanian writer in the 20th and 21st century is probably Ismail Kadare.

=== Cuisine ===
Throughout the centuries, Albanian cuisine has been widely influenced by Albanian culture, geography and history, and as such, different parts of the country enjoy specific regional cuisines. Cooking traditions especially vary between the north and the south, owing to differing topography and climate that essentially contribute to the excellent growth conditions for a wide array of herbs, fruits, and vegetables.

Albanians produce and use many varieties of fruits such as lemons, oranges, figs, and most notably, olives, which are perhaps the most important element of Albanian cooking. Spices and other herbs such as basil, lavender, mint, oregano, rosemary, and thyme are widely used, as are vegetables such as garlic, onions, peppers, potatoes, tomatoes, as well as legumes of all types.

With a coastline along the Adriatic and Ionian in the Mediterranean Sea, fish, crustaceans, and seafood are a popular and an integral part of the diet. Otherwise, lamb is the traditional meat for different holidays and religious festivals for both Christians and Muslims, although poultry, beef, and pork are also in plentiful supply.

Tavë kosi ("soured milk casserole") is the national dish, consisting of lamb and rice baked under a thick, tart veil of yoghurt. Fërgesë is another national dish, made up of peppers, tomatoes, and cottage cheese. Pite is also popular, a baked pastry with a filling of a mixture of spinach and gjizë (curd) or mish (ground meat).

Petulla, a traditional fried dough, is also a popular speciality, and is served with powdered sugar or feta cheese and different sorts of fruit jams. Flia consists of multiple crêpe-like layers brushed with cream and served with sour cream. Krofne, similar to Berliner doughnuts, are filled with jam, or chocolate and often eaten during winter.

Coffee is an integral part of the lifestyle, with more coffee houses per capita than any other country in the world. Tea is also enjoyed both at home or outside at cafés, bars, or restaurants. Çaj Mali (Sideritis tea) is beloved and a part of the daily routine for most Albanians. It is cultivated across Southern Albania and noted for its medicinal properties. Black tea is also popular. Albanian wine has been cultivated for thousands of years.

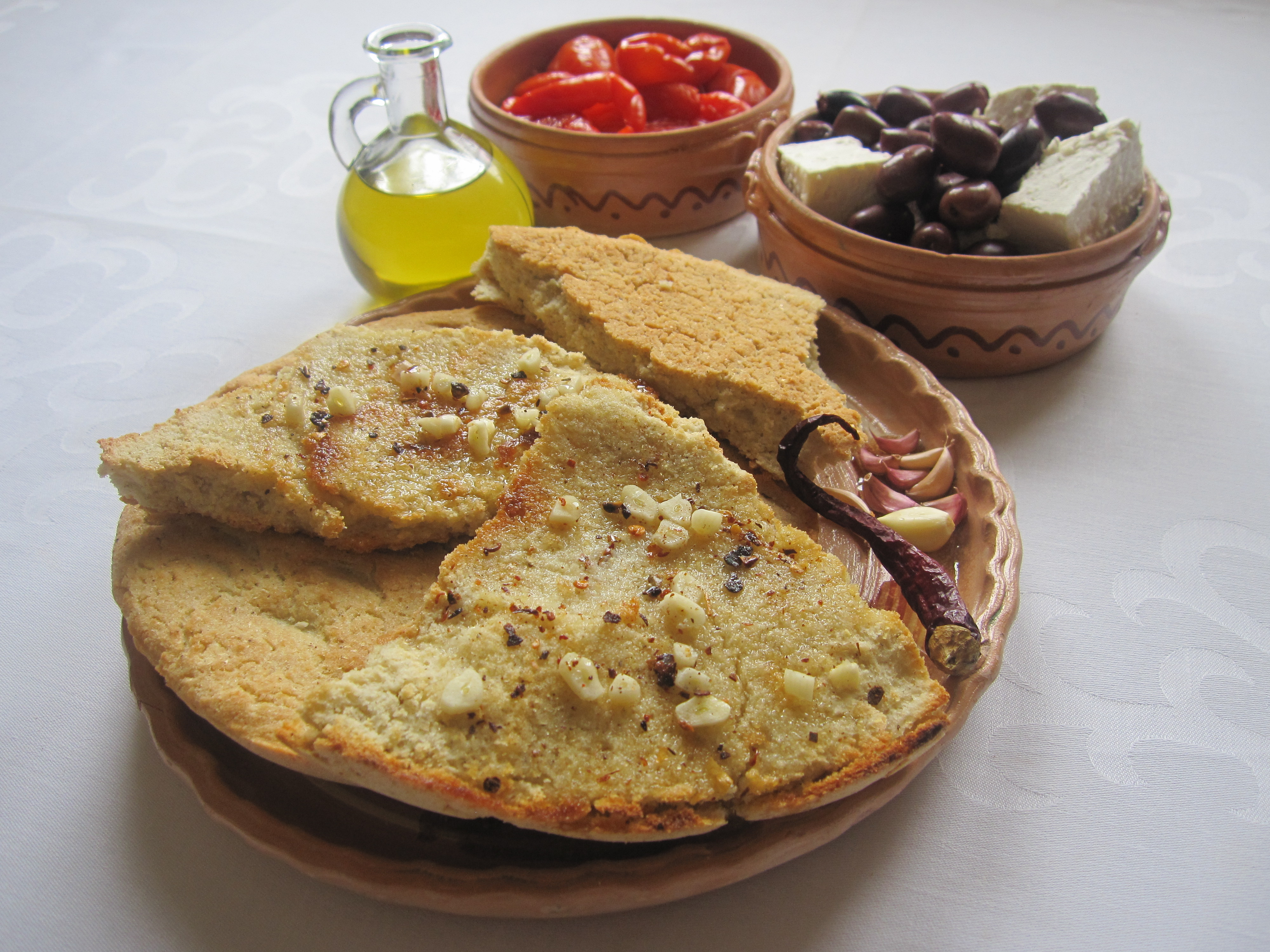
Bukë misri (cornbread) is a staple on the Albanian table.

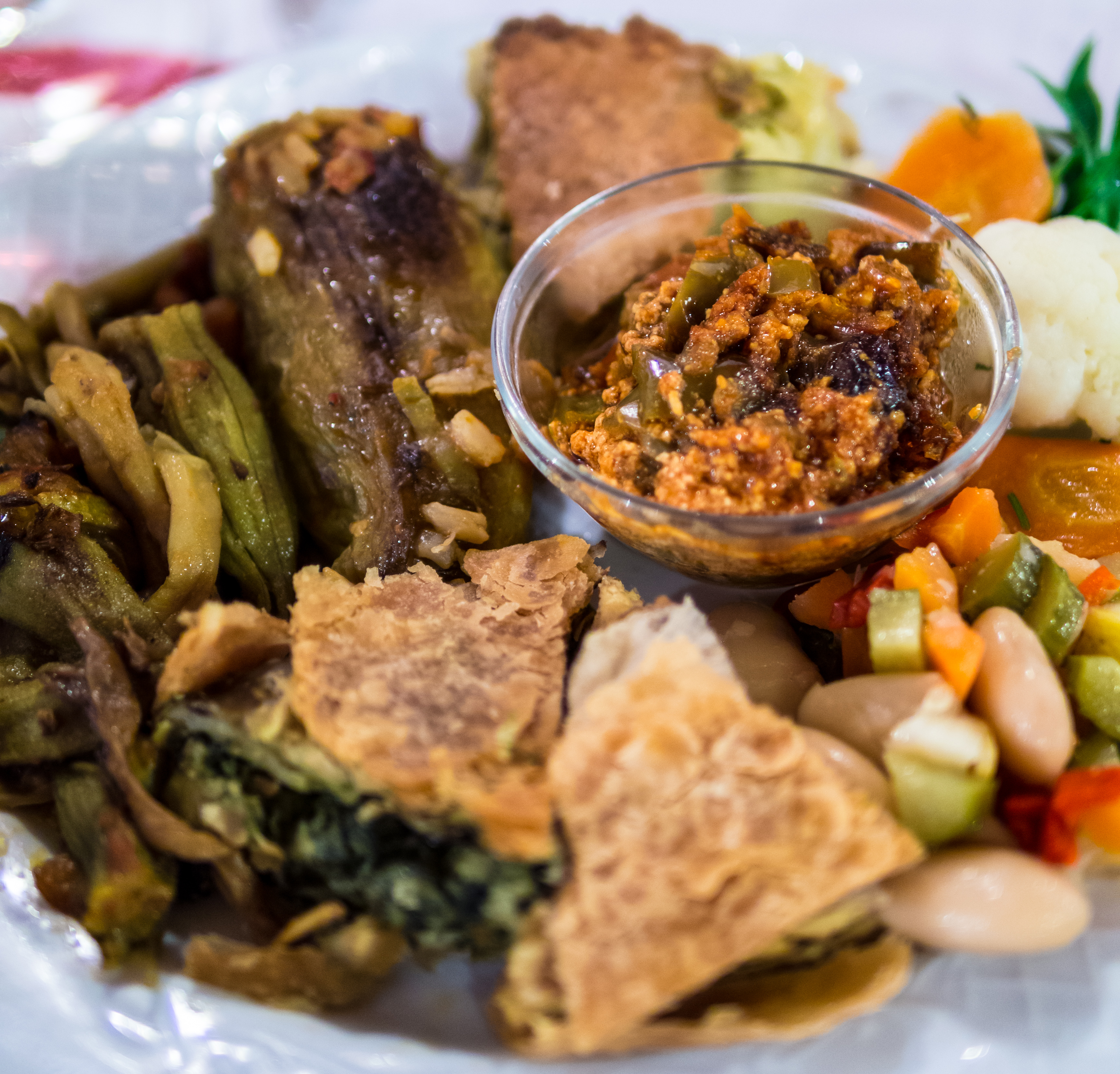
Speca të fërguar (roasted peppers) served with pite, a traditional and prominent layered Albanian pie

=== Sports ===
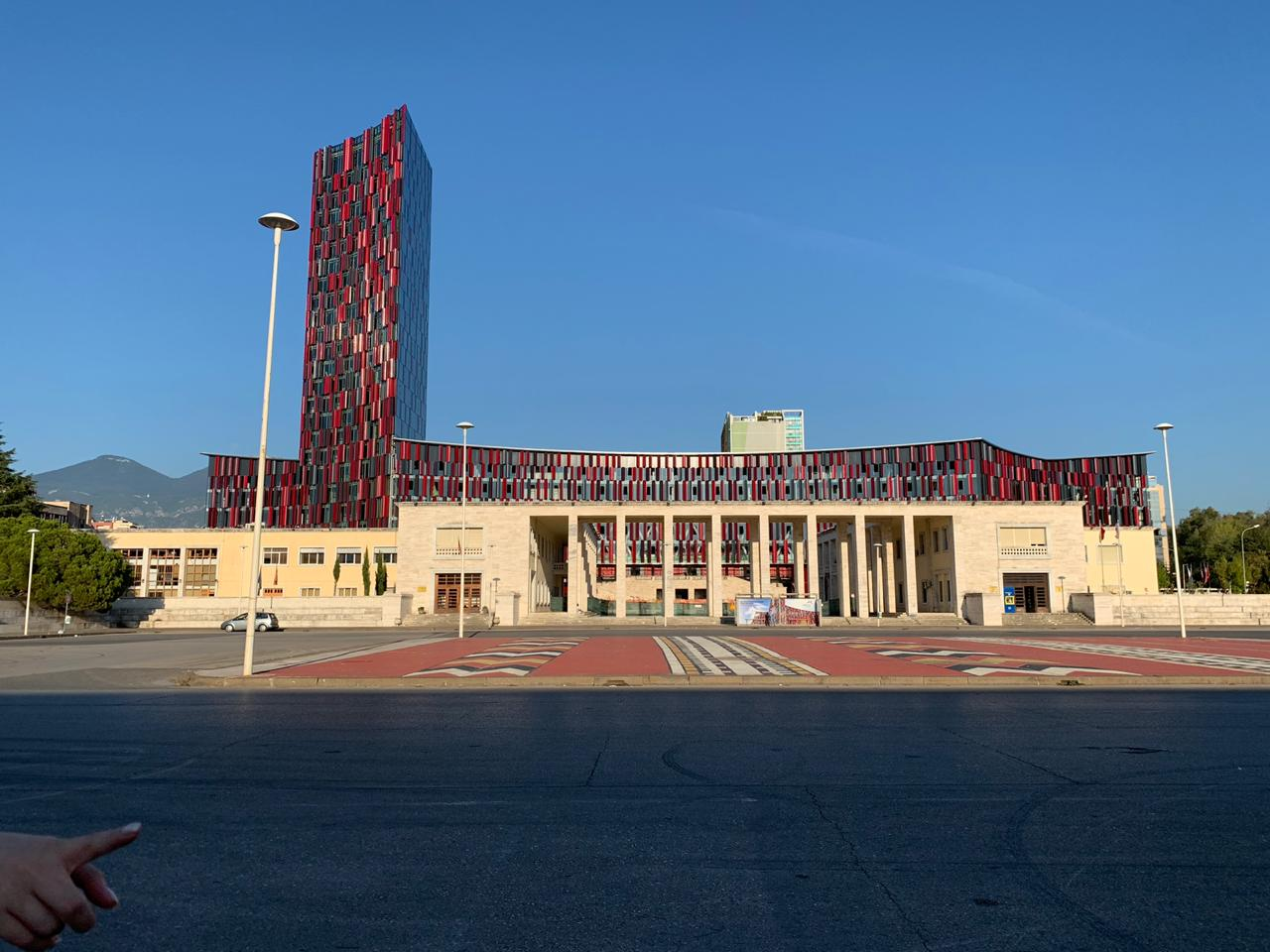
Arena Kombëtare in central Tirana

Albania participated at the Olympic Games in 1972 for the first time. The country made their Winter Olympic Games debut in 2006. Albania missed the next four games, two of them due to the 1980 and 1984 boycotts, but returned for the 1992 games in Barcelona. Since then, Albania have participated in all games. Albania normally competes in events that include swimming, athletics, weightlifting, shooting and wrestling. The country have been represented by the National Olympic Committee of Albania since 1972. The nation has participated at the Mediterranean Games since the games of 1987 in Syria. The Albanian athletes have won a total of 43 (8 gold, 17 silver and 18 bronze) medals from 1987 to 2013.

Popular sports include football, weightlifting, basketball, volleyball, tennis, swimming, rugby union and gymnastics. Football is by far the most popular sport and is governed by the Football Association of Albania (Albanian: Federata Shqiptare e Futbollit, F.SH.F.), which has membership in FIFA and UEFA. The Albania national football team, ranking 51st in the World in 2017 (highest 22nd on 22 August 2015) have won the 1946 Balkan Cup and the Malta Rothmans International Tournament 2000, but had never participated in any major UEFA or FIFA tournament, until UEFA Euro 2016, Albania's first ever appearance at the continental tournament and at a major men's football tournament. Albania scored their first ever goal in a major tournament and secured their first ever win in European Championship when they beat Romania by 1–0 in a UEFA Euro 2016 match on 19 June 2016. The most successful football clubs are Skënderbeu, KF Tirana, Dinamo Tirana, Partizani and Vllaznia.

Weightlifting is one of the most successful individual sports, with the national team winning medals at the European Weightlifting Championships and the rest international competitions. Albanian weightlifters have won a total of 16 medals at the European Championships with one of them being gold, seven silver and eight bronze. In the World Weightlifting Championships, the Albanian weightlifting team has won in 1972 a gold, in 2002 a silver, and in 2011 a bronze medal.

== See also ==
- Outline of Albania
- Bibliography of Albania
