= Transport in Albania =

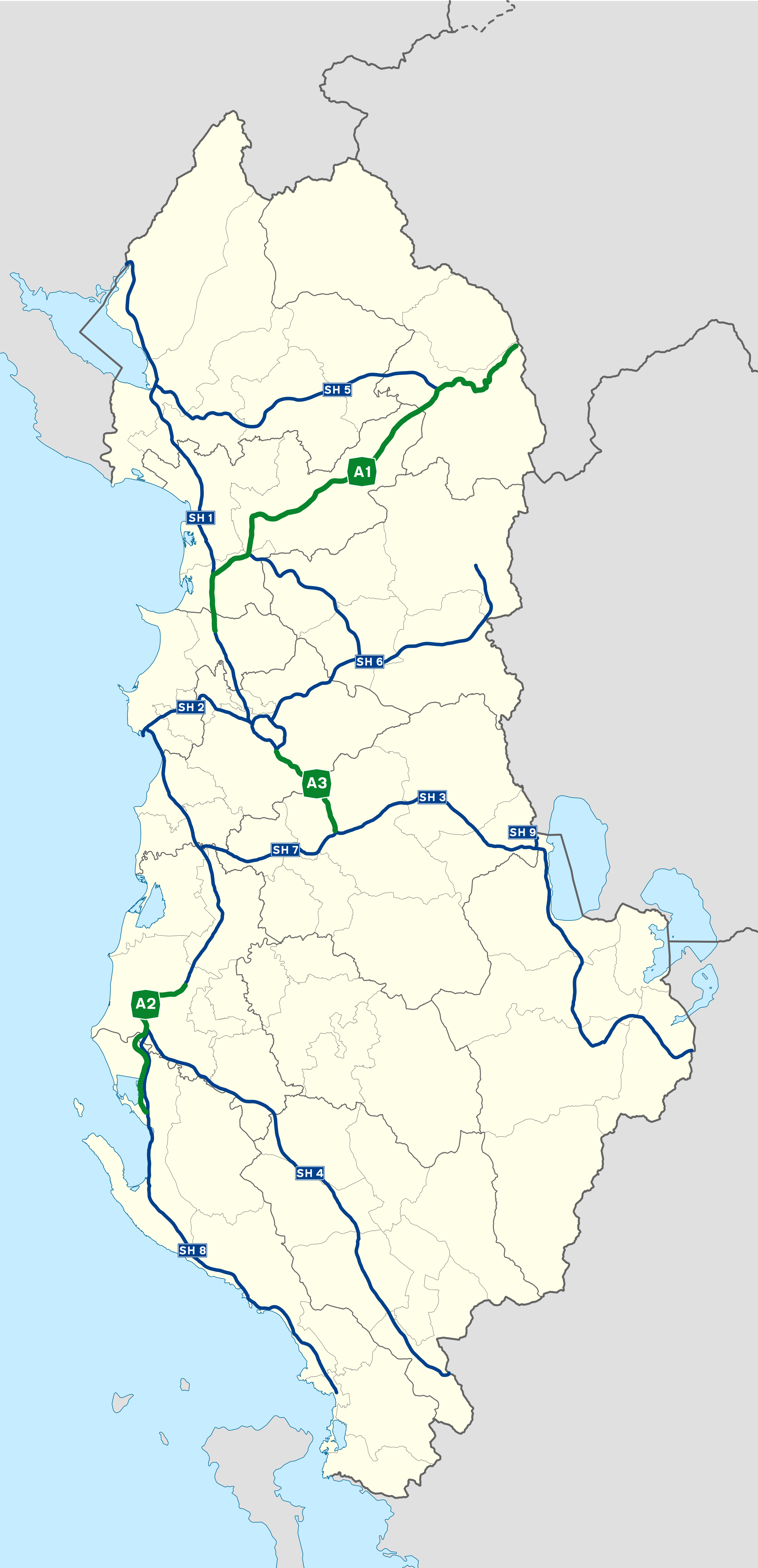
Highway network in Albania

Transport in Albania consists of transport by land, water and air, which are predominantly under the supervision of the Ministry of Infrastructure of Albania. The development and improvement of the transport in the country remains among the most important priorities of the Government of Albania.

It has experienced significant changes and major growth and expansion in recent years, especially after the fall of communism in the country. Improvements to the road infrastructure, urban transport, and air travel have all led to a vast improvement in transportation. These upgrades have played a key role in supporting Albania's economy, which in the past decade has come to rely heavily on the construction industry.

== History ==
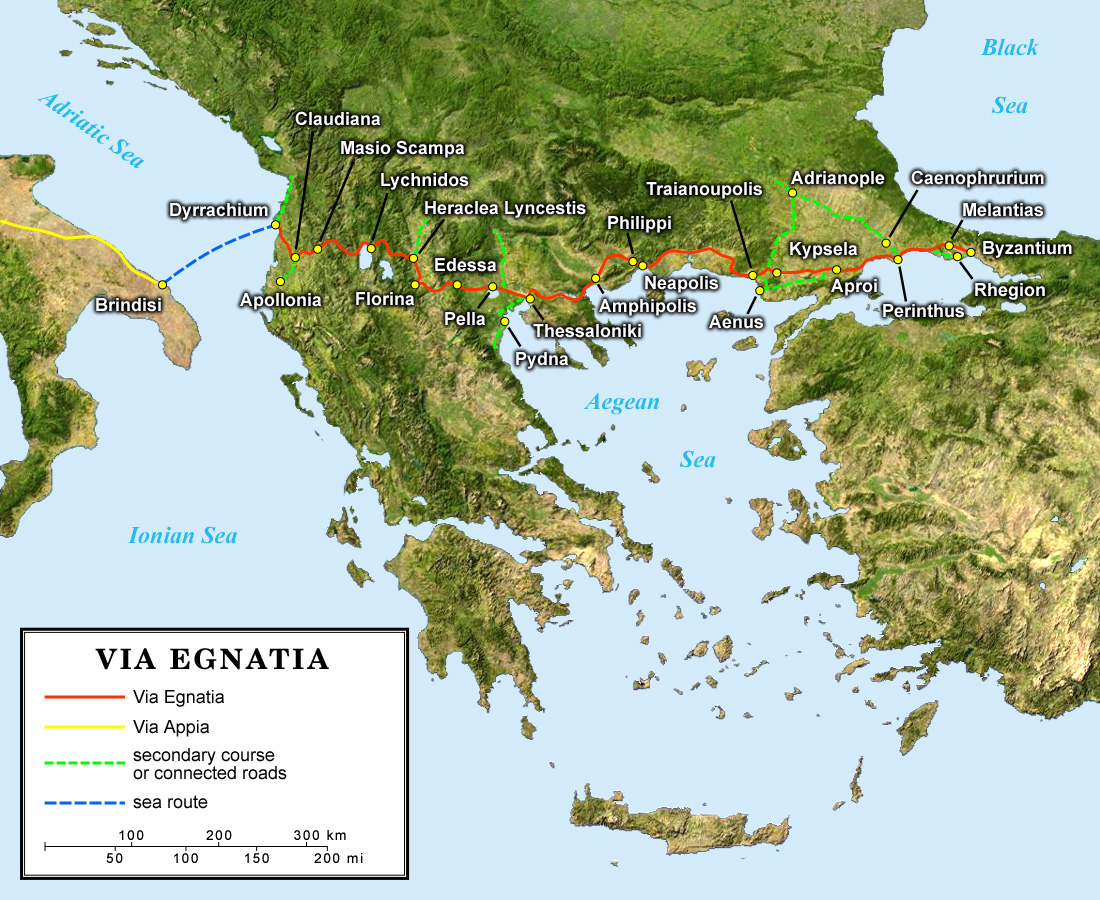
Via Egnatia connecting Dyrrachium with Byzantium

Since antiquity, the area of modern Albania served as a crossroad of important caravan routes such as the Roman Via Egnatia linking the Adriatic with Byzantium (later Constantinople). The Italian fascist regime of Mussolini carried out a project of road constructions in Albania in the 1930s, yet auto-mobility was limited at the time. The total length of Albania's roads more than doubled in the first three decades after World War II, and by the 1980s almost all of the country's remote mountain areas were connected, either by dirt or paved roads, with the capital city of Tirana, and ports on the Adriatic and Ionian Sea.

After 1947, a significant infrastructure undertaking was the construction of the country's rail network as Albania was considered the only country in Europe not to have standard rail service. By 1987, 677 km of railway were constructed in total linking the main urban and industrial centers for the first time since the end of World War II. Train transport was the main public transportation method until 1990. After the collapse of Communism, the network fell into disregard, operating with second-hand carriages in a constant precarious state.

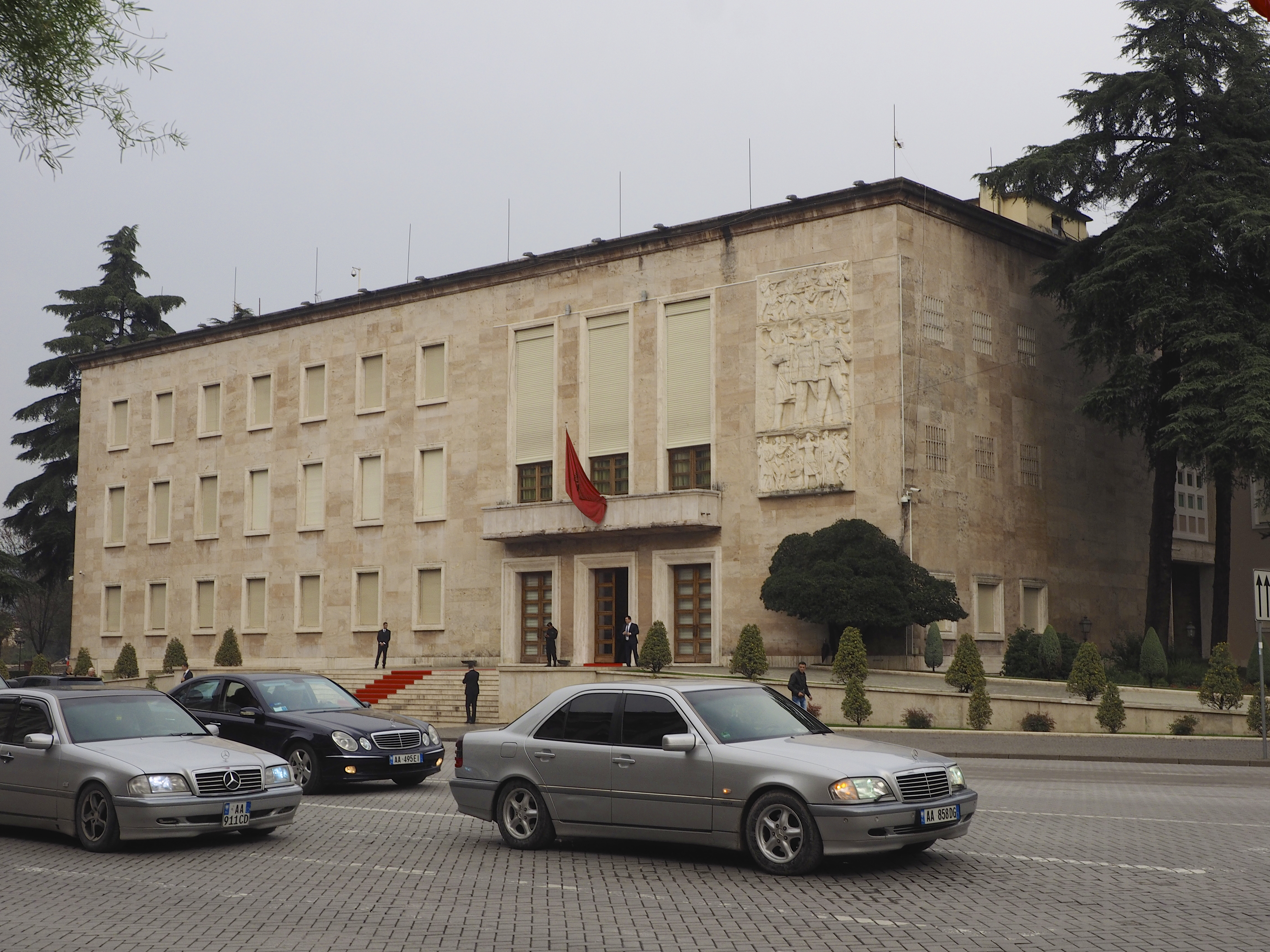
Mercedes-Benz vehicles on the main boulevard in Tirana, Albania

Central government funding of local road maintenance effectively ended in 1991, and the breakdown of repair vehicles because of a lack of spare parts threatened to close access to some remote areas. A group of Greek construction companies signed a protocol with the Albanian government in July 1990 to build a 200 kilometer road across the southern part of the country, extending from the Albanian-Greek border to Durrës. The project was scheduled to last four years and cost US$500 million. Despite the poor quality of Albania's roads, most of the country's freight was conveyed over them in a fleet of about 15,000 trucks. According to official figures, in 1987 Albania's roadways carried about 66 percent of the country's total freight tonnage.

Up until 1991, the total number of cars in Albania was between 5000 and 7000. In 1991, the Albanian government lifted the decades-old ban on private-vehicle ownership. As a result, car imports numbered about 1,500 per month. Traffic in the capital remained light, but traffic lights and other control devices were urgently needed to deal with the multiplying number of privately owned cars. Albanian entrepreneurs also imported used Greek buses and started carrying passengers on intercity routes that did not exist or had been poorly serviced during the communist era.

The population is known for owning a large fleet of German cars. In particular, Mercedes-Benz vehicles are widely preferred not only for their status symbol, but also for their durability on rural roads where half of the population resides, and the cheap price for buying used ones. Mercedes-Benz cars were owned by Enver Hoxha and reportedly favored by his officials, giving the brand a foothold even before private ownership of cars was legalized. By 2004 the number of cars in the capital Tirana had increased to over 300,000 and air pollution became a pressing concern. These are mostly 1990s and early 2000s diesel cars, while it is widely believed that the fuel used in Albania contains larger amounts of sulfur and lead than in the European Union. Albania is probably one of the few countries in Europe where vehicles imported from the United States, and from left hand traffic jurisdictions (for example the United Kingdom) can be found on the streets without any modifications brought from expats living abroad.

== Transportation ==
=== Air ===
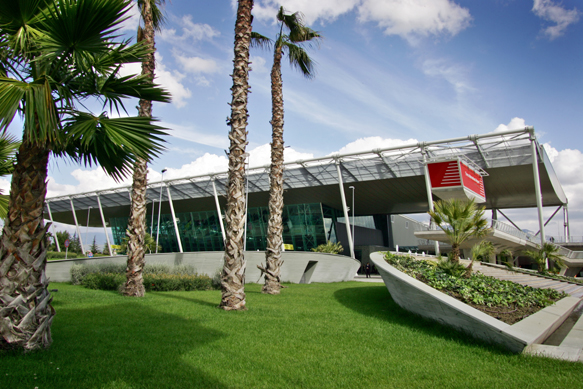
Tirana International Airport

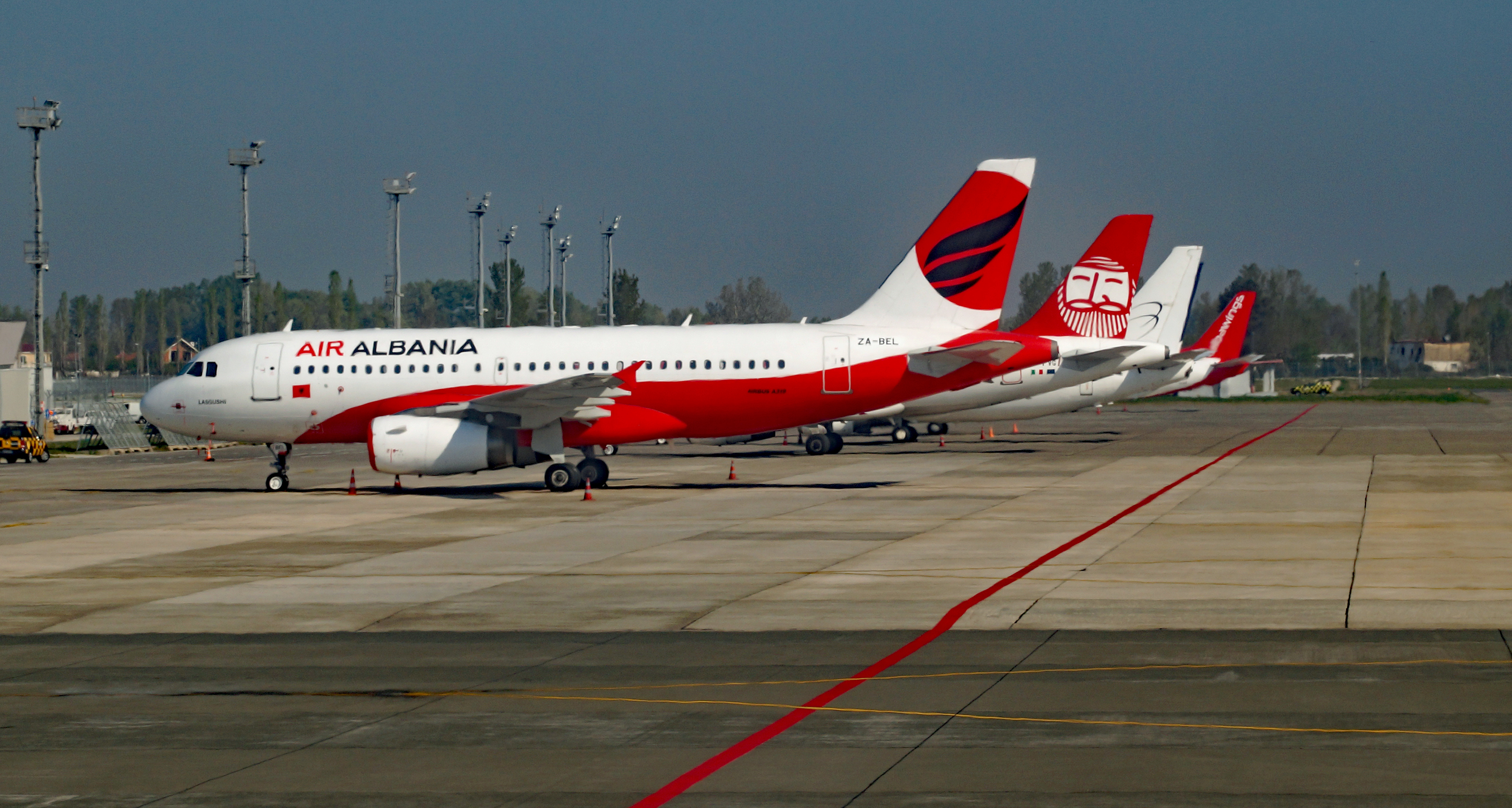
Air Albania national flag carrier in Tirana

The most important and biggest international airport of the country is the Tirana International Airport Nënë Tereza (TIA), in Tirana, the country's capital. The total number of passengers for the country was 1,997,044 in 2015 and 2,200,449 in 2016. From January to October 2017, the airport served 2,224,833 passengers and handled 1,857 tons of goods.

In 2005, an American-German consortium was granted a 20-year concession over TIA and Albanian airspace. Despite the considerable modernization of the airport, prices are among the highest in Europe because of the monopoly over Albanian airspace, and limited carrier choices. As a result, low-cost carriers are discouraged from entering the Albanian market, while neighboring countries offer much lower prices from their primary and secondary airports.

Following a period of intensive negotiations, the Albanian government managed to reduce the concession period by 5 years until 2020, thus opening up the possibility for low-cost airlines to enter the Albanian market such as the starting of flights between Tirana and Budapest by Wizz Air in 2017. After reaching an agreement with the Albanian Government to end its monopoly on international flights from Albania, Hochtief AirPort sold the operation of TIA to China Everbright Limited,

Kukës Airport was opened in 2008, making this the second civilian airport in Albania but has since not been operational. The airport was bought by an Albanian company and is planned to become operational by 2021 offering low cost flights catered to the Kukes diaspora in the UK and serve as a gateway to the Albanian Alps.

In 2018, Air Albania, the country's current flag carrier was formed by a consortium made up of Turkish Airlines, Albanian Civil Aviation Authority, and several Albanian companies with a test flight to Istanbul. As of 2019, the airline offers service to destinations in Italy and Turkey.

In 2018, the Albanian government announced the construction of Vlorë International Airport, the third civilian airport in Albania near Akerni on the Vjose-Narte Protected Area. In 2019, a new project was unveiled including the construction of a marina and agritourism area. The construction works on the ground for the airport started in 2021, and are expected to finish by 2025.

=== Road ===
The speed limit table of Albania.

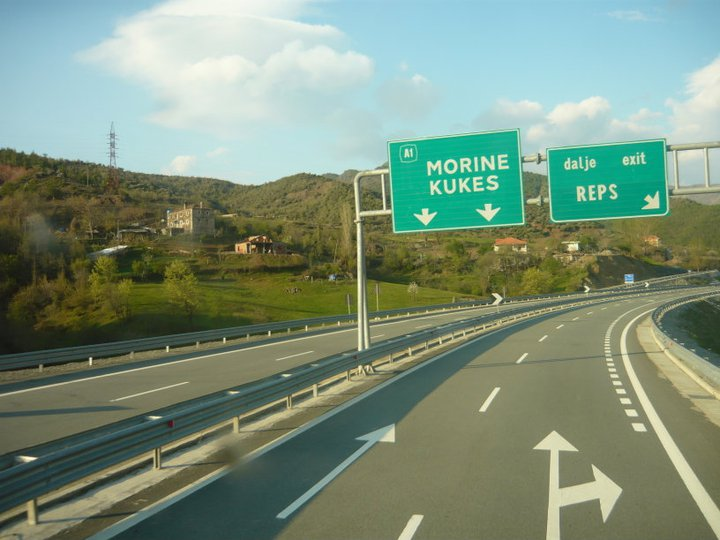
Scene on A1 Motorway linking Albania with Kosovo, and the Adriatic Sea with the Albania Alps.

The overwhelming majority of roads in the country are owned and maintained by state and local governments. In recent years, a major road construction spree took place on the main state roads of Albania, involving the construction of new roadways, putting of contemporary signs, planting of trees, and related greening projects. Works on most highways are completed, though they remained unfinished between 2011 and 2013 as per lack of funds.

After the fall of communism in 1991, Albania began to revamp its primitive road infrastructure by building the first highway in the country, SH2 connecting Tirane with Durrës. Since the 2000s, main roadways have drastically improved, though lacking standards in design and road safety.

At present, major cities are linked with either new single/dual carriageways or well maintained roads. There is a dual carriageway connecting the port city of Durrës with Tirana, Vlorë, and partially Kukës. There are three official motorway segments in Albania: Kashar-Thumanë-Milot-Rrëshen-Kalimash-Kukës-Morinë (A1), Fier-Vlorë (A2), and Tirane-Elbasan (A3). Most rural segments continue to remain in bad conditions as their reconstruction has only begun in the late 2000s by the Albanian Development Fund.

- Total: 18,000 km
  - Paved: 12,920 km
  - Unpaved: 5,080 km (2002 est.)

country comparison to the world: 118

All roads are property of Albanian Road Authority (Autoriteti Rrugor Shqiptar, former Drejtoria e Përgjithshme e Rrugëve) and maintained by Ndërmarrja Shtetërore Rruga-Ura. Albania does not use a nationwide motorway vignette system; instead, road charges are applied to particular motorway and tunnel sections. The A1 corridor toward Kosovo has operated as a toll route since 2018, while newer infrastructure has introduced additional point-based charges. The Llogara Tunnel, for example, provides an alternative to the mountain pass on the route toward the southern Riviera and charges passenger cars 250 lek per passage. Drivers may therefore encounter tolls on specific routes even though most of the national road network does not require a general road-use vignette. Albanian bitumen from Selenicë in Southern Albania is well known for its quality as it has been used on some European motorways.

==== Motorways ====
Motorway	County	Length	Description	Cities
A1 (Albania)	Durrës, Tirana, Lezhë, Kukës	114 km (71 mi)	The A1 (Albanian: Autostrada A1) is a four traffic lane motorway spanning 114 km (71 mi). The motorway is the only toll motorway in Albania and connects the Albanian Adriatic Sea Coast at Durrës in the southwest with the Albanian Alps at Morinë in the northeast. It forms part of the European route E851, planned Adriatic–Ionian motorway, and Pan-European Corridor X.	Durrës, Laç, Lezhë, Rrëshen, Kukës
A2	Fier, Vlorë	46.5 km (28.9 mi)	The A2 (Albanian: Autostrada A2) is a four traffic lane motorway, spanning 46.5 km (28.9 mi). The motorway connects Fier in the north and Vlorë in the south. It will form part of the Adriatic–Ionian motorway.	Fier, Vlorë
A3	Tirana, Elbasan	31.1 km (19.3 mi)	The A3 (Albanian: Autostrada A3) is a four traffic lane motorway, spanning 31 km (19 mi). The motorway connects Tirana in the northwest and Elbasan in the southeast. It will form part of the Pan-European Corridor VIII.	Tirana, Elbasan

==== Expressways ====
Expressway	County	Length	Description	Cities
SH 1 (Albania)	Durrës, Lezhë, Shkodër, Tirana	125 km (78 mi)	The SH 1 (Albanian: Rruga Shtetërore SH 1) is an expressway, spanning 125 km (78 mi). The expressway connects Montenegro across the counties of Shkodër, Lezhë, Durrës and Tirana to the capital of Tirana. It is currently part of the European routes E762 and E851 and will form part of the Adriatic–Ionian motorway.	Fushë-Krujë, Koplik, Laç, Lezhë, Shkodër, Tirana
SH 2 (Albania)	Durrës, Tirana	33 km (21 mi)	The SH 2 (Albanian: Rruga Shtetërore SH 2) is an expressway, spanning 33 km (21 mi). The expressway connects the capital Tirana across the counties of Durrës and Tirana to the second largest city of Durrës. It is currently part of the European route E762.	Durrës, Tirana
Highways in Albania	Elbasan, Korçë, Tirana	151 km (94 mi)	The SH 3 (Albanian: Rruga Shtetërore SH 3) is an expressway, spanning 151 km (94 mi). The expressway connects Greece across the counties of Elbasan, Korçë, and Tirana to the capital Tirana. It is currently part of the European routes E86 and E852.	Elbasan, Korçë, Librazhd, Pogradec, Tirana
	Durrës, Fier, Gjirokastër, Tirana	215 km (134 mi)	The SH 4 (Albanian: Rruga Shtetërore SH 4) is an expressway, spanning 215 km (134 mi). The expressway connects Durrës across the counties of Elbasan, Korçë, and Tirana to Greece. It is currently part of the European route E853 and will form part of the Adriatic–Ionian motorway.	Durrës, Fier, Gjirokastër, Lushnjë, Rogozhina, Tepelenë
Highways in Albania	Elbasan, Tirana	40.5 km (25.2 mi)	The SH 7 (Albanian: Rruga Shtetërore SH 7) is an expressway, spanning 40.5 km (25.2 mi). The expressway connects Rogozhina across the counties of Elbasan and Tirana to Elbasan. It is currently part of the Pan-European Corridor VIII.	Elbasan, Peqin, Rogozhina
SH 8 (Albania)	Fier, Vlorë	148 km (92 mi)	The SH 8 (Albanian: Rruga Shtetërore SH 8) is an expressway, spanning 148 km (92 mi). The expressway connects Fier across the counties of Fier, Vlorë to Sarandë.	Fier, Himara, Sarandë, Vlorë
Highways in Albania	Elbasan	3.2 km (2.0 mi)	The SH 9 (Albanian: Rruga Shtetërore SH 9) is an expressway, spanning 3.2 km (2.0 mi). The expressway connects Qafë Thanë across the county of Elbasan to North Macedonia. It is currently part of the European route E852.	–

==== Corridors ====
The realisation of the Adriatic–Ionian Corridor, that is expected to connect all the region from the northwest to the southwest of the Balkan Peninsula, is considered one of the most important infrastructure projects of Albania. The corridor is planned to follow the routes of the SH1, SH2, SH4 expressways and the A1 motorway nonetheless the country has mostly completed its corridor section and significant constructions are still in progress such as the highway between Thumana and Kashar as well as the bypasses of Gjirokastër, Lezhë, Tepelenë and Tirana.

=== Rail ===
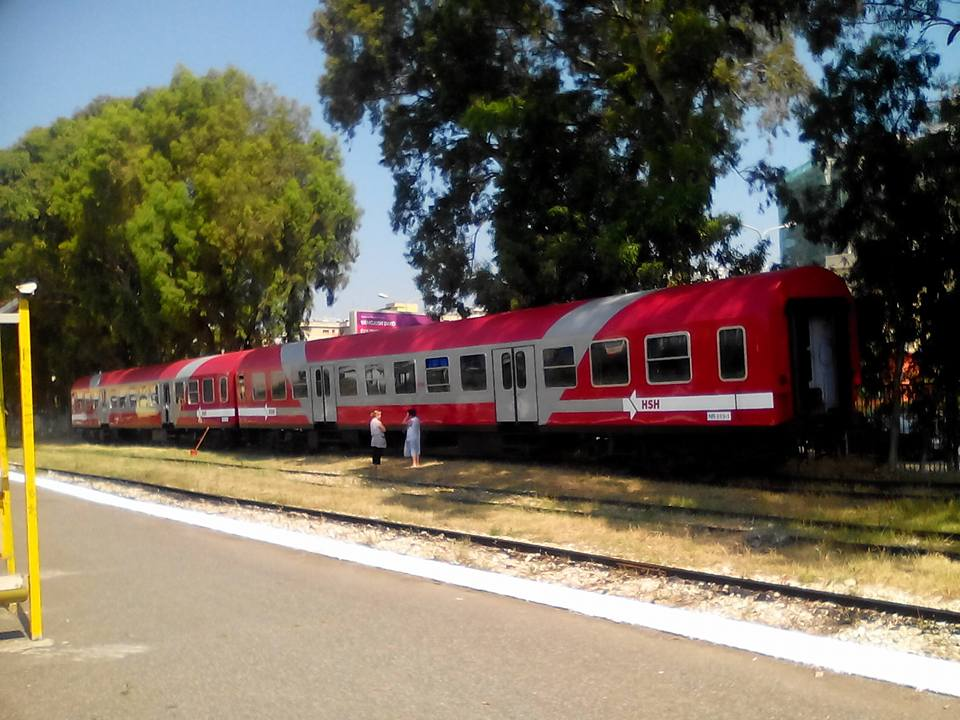
HSH train along the Durrës-Tiranë line

Total: 447 km

country comparison to the world: 120

Standard gauge: 447 km 1,435 mm (4 ft 8 1/2 in) gauge (2006)

Railway links with neighbouring countries:

- Kosovo - no
- Greece - no
- North Macedonia - no
- Montenegro - yes (freight service only)

=== Water ===
- Total: 43 km plus Albanian sections of Lake Scutari, Ohër Lake, and Big Prespa Lake (1990)

Albania's main seaports are Durrës, Vlorë, Sarandë, and Shëngjin. By 1983 there were regular ferry, freight, and passenger services from Durrës to Trieste, Italy.

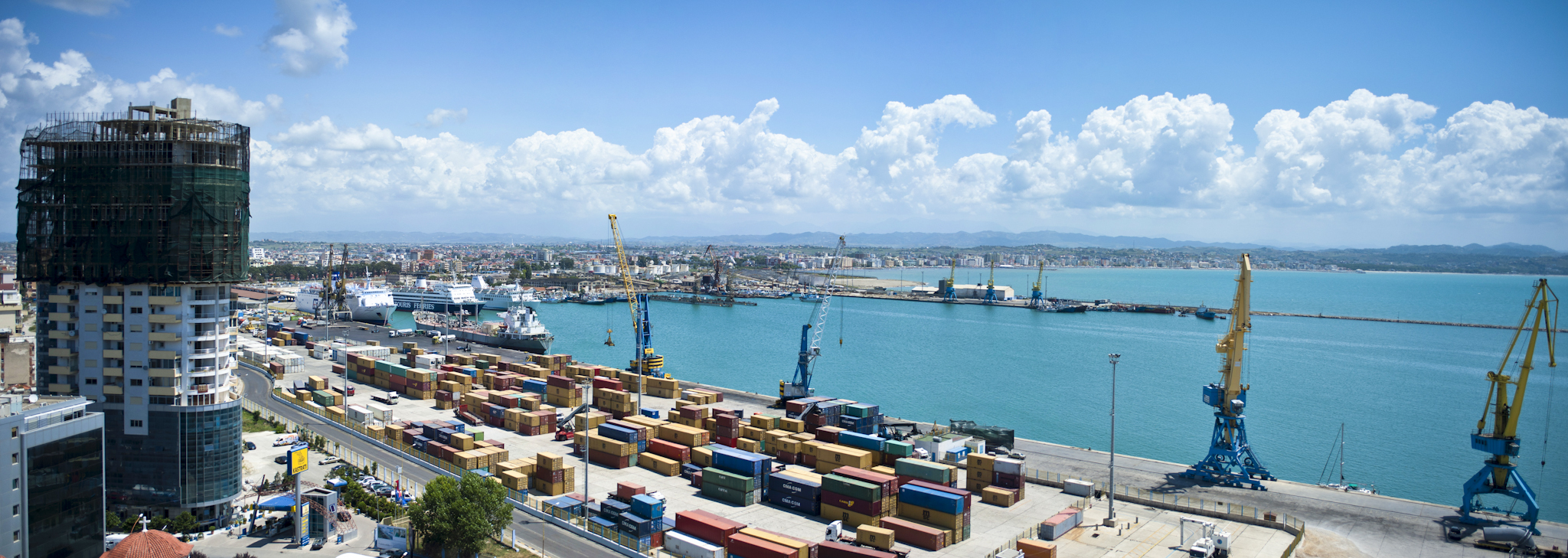
The advantageous location of Durrës makes it the biggest port in Albania and among the largest in the Adriatic and Ionian seas.

In 1988, a ferry service was established between Sarandë and the Greek island of Corfu. A regular lake ferry linked the Macedonian town of Ohrid with Pogradec. The limited capacity of the wharves at Durrës caused severe bottlenecks in the distribution of foreign food aid in 1991. In 2011, the Port of Durrës underwent major renovations including the construction of a new passenger terminal. The port is expected to be relocated nearby, and a new luxury yachts marina constructed by Dubai based Emaar company called Durres Yachts and Marina.

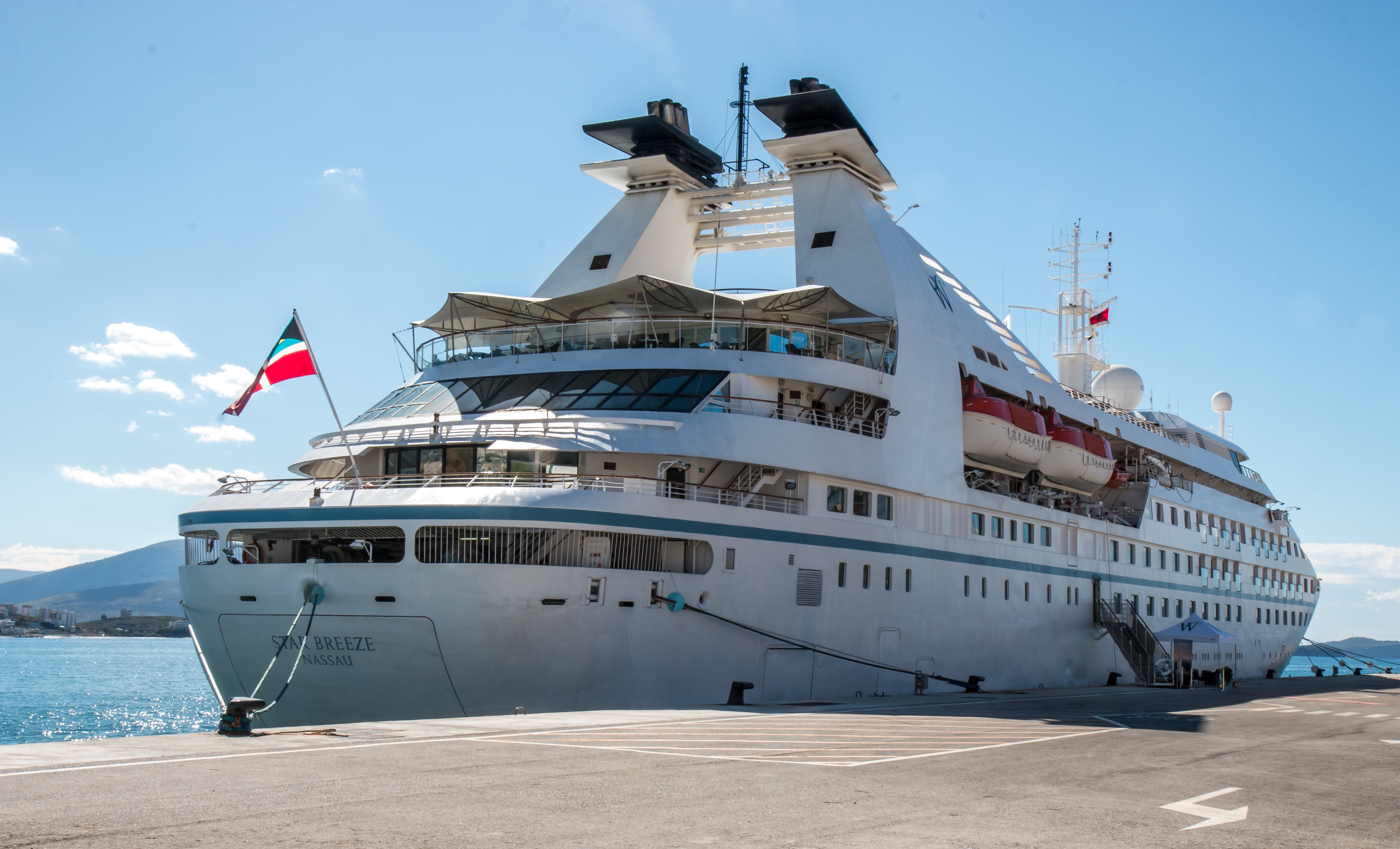
The Star Breeze Cruise ship in the Port of Sarandë

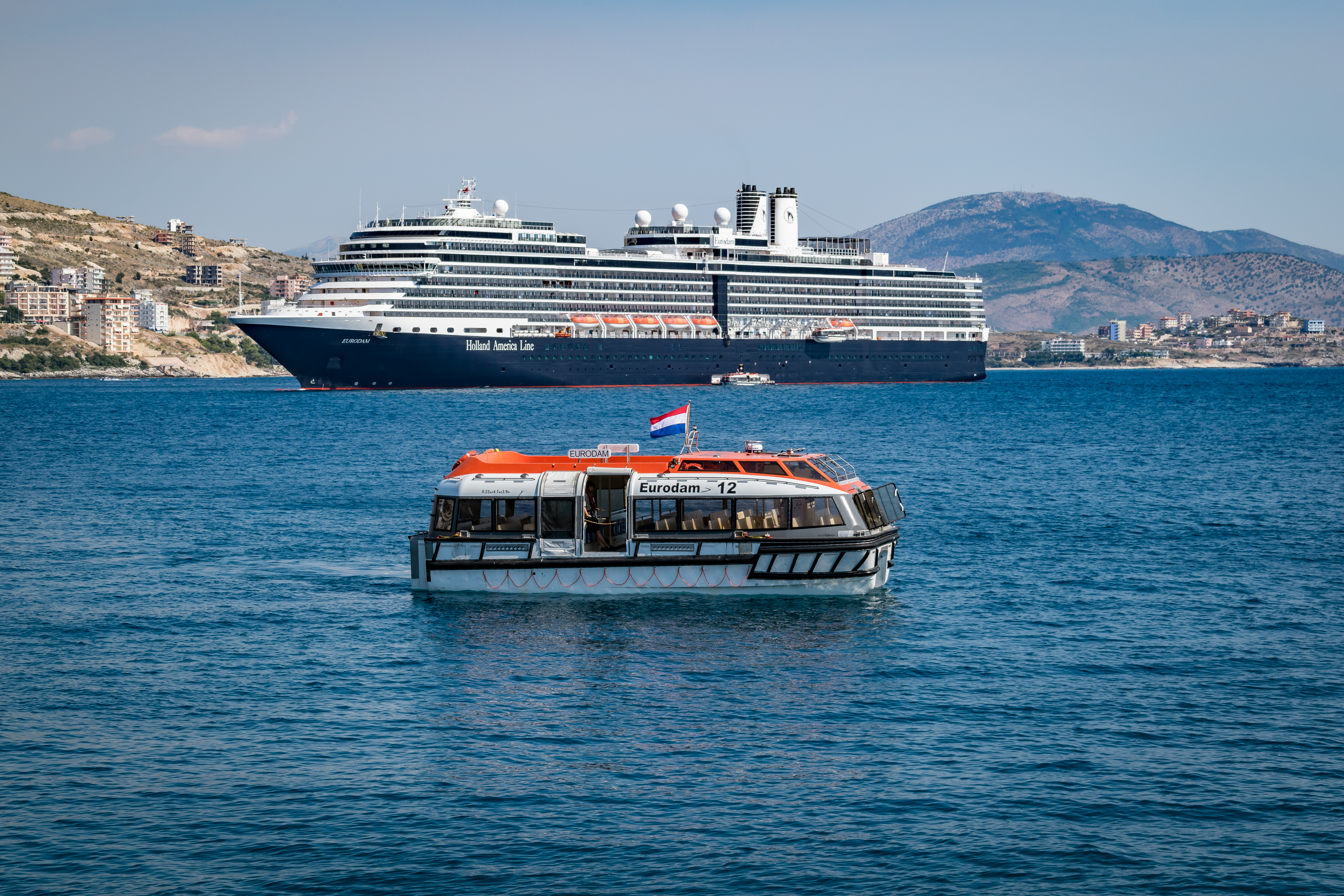
Holland America Eurodam ship in Saranda

The Merchant Marine include 24 vessels country comparison to the world: 91 Total includes 7 ships of 1,000 gross tonnage (GT) or over, totalling: 13,423 GT/20,837 tonnes deadweight (DWT)

Ferry services within Albania:

- Lake Komani Ferry operates between Koman and Fierza in Northern Albania
- Butrint Cable Ferry crosses the Vivari Channel at Butrint in Southern Albania
- Karaburun Ferry has operated since 2014 between the Karaburun Peninsula and Sazan Island along the Albanian Riviera in southern Albania (seasonal)

Albanian ports and marinas
Port	County	Coordinates	External Link
Port of Durrës (planned to be relocated and a luxury marina built in its place)	Durrës County	41°18′35″N 19°27′26″E	www.apdurres.com.al
Port of Sarandë	Vlorë County	39°52′15″N 20°0′11″E	www.portisarande.al
Port of Shëngjin	Lezhë County	41°48′20″N 19°35′35″E	portishengjin.al
Port of Vlorë	Vlorë County	40°27′1″N 19°29′0″E	www.portivlore.com
Orikum Marina	Vlorë County	40°20′25″N 19°28′20″E	www.orikum.it
Porto Albania (under construction)	Durrës County	41°08′34″N 19°26′26″E	www.portoalbania.com

=== Pipelines ===
Crude oil 207 km (129 mi); natural gas 229 km (142 mi) (2008)

The construction of 1.2 billion dollar AMBO pipeline was planned to begin in 2007. This would connect the port of Burgas in Bulgaria with the port of Vlora in Albania. It is expected to ship 750,000 barrels (119,000 m^{3}) to 1,000,000 barrels (160,000 m^{3}) of crude oil each day. However, the Trans Adriatic Pipeline seems more likely to get started.

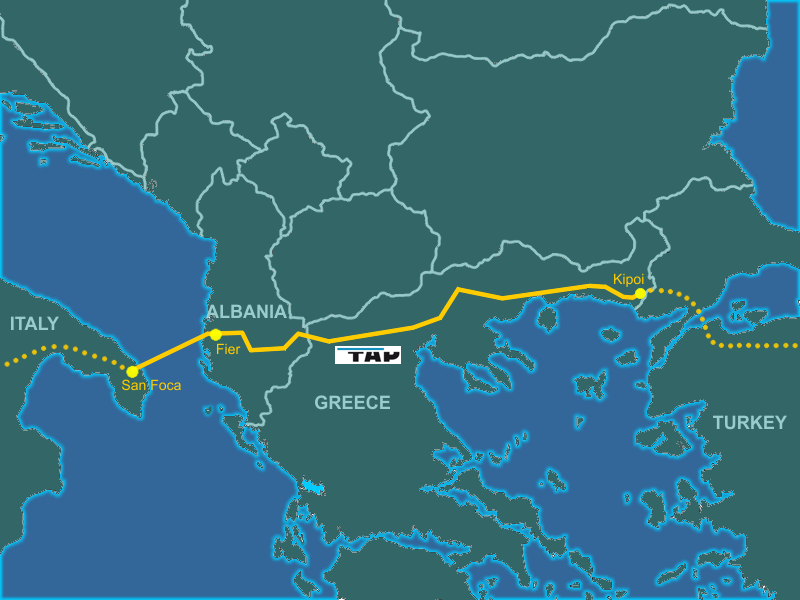
The map of the Trans Adriatic Pipeline

The Trans Adriatic Pipeline is a pipeline project to transport natural gas from the Caspian Sea, starting from Greece via Albania and the Adriatic Sea to Italy and further to Western Europe.

TAP's route through Albania is approximately 215 kilometres onshore and 37 km offshore in the Albanian section of the Adriatic Sea. It starts at Bilisht Qendër in the Korça region at the Albanian border with Greece, and arrives at the Adriatic coast 17 km north-west of Fier, 400 metres inland from the shoreline. A compressor station will be built near Fier, and an additional compressor is planned near Bilisht should capacity be expanded to 20 billion cubic metres (bcm). Eight block valve stations and one landfall station will be built along its route.

In the mountainous areas, approximately 51 km of new access roads will be constructed while 41 km of existing roads will be upgraded, 42 bridges refurbished and three new bridges built. In the summer of 2015, TAP started the construction and rehabilitation of access roads and bridges along the pipeline's route in Albania. The work is expected to be completed during 2016.

== Public transportation ==
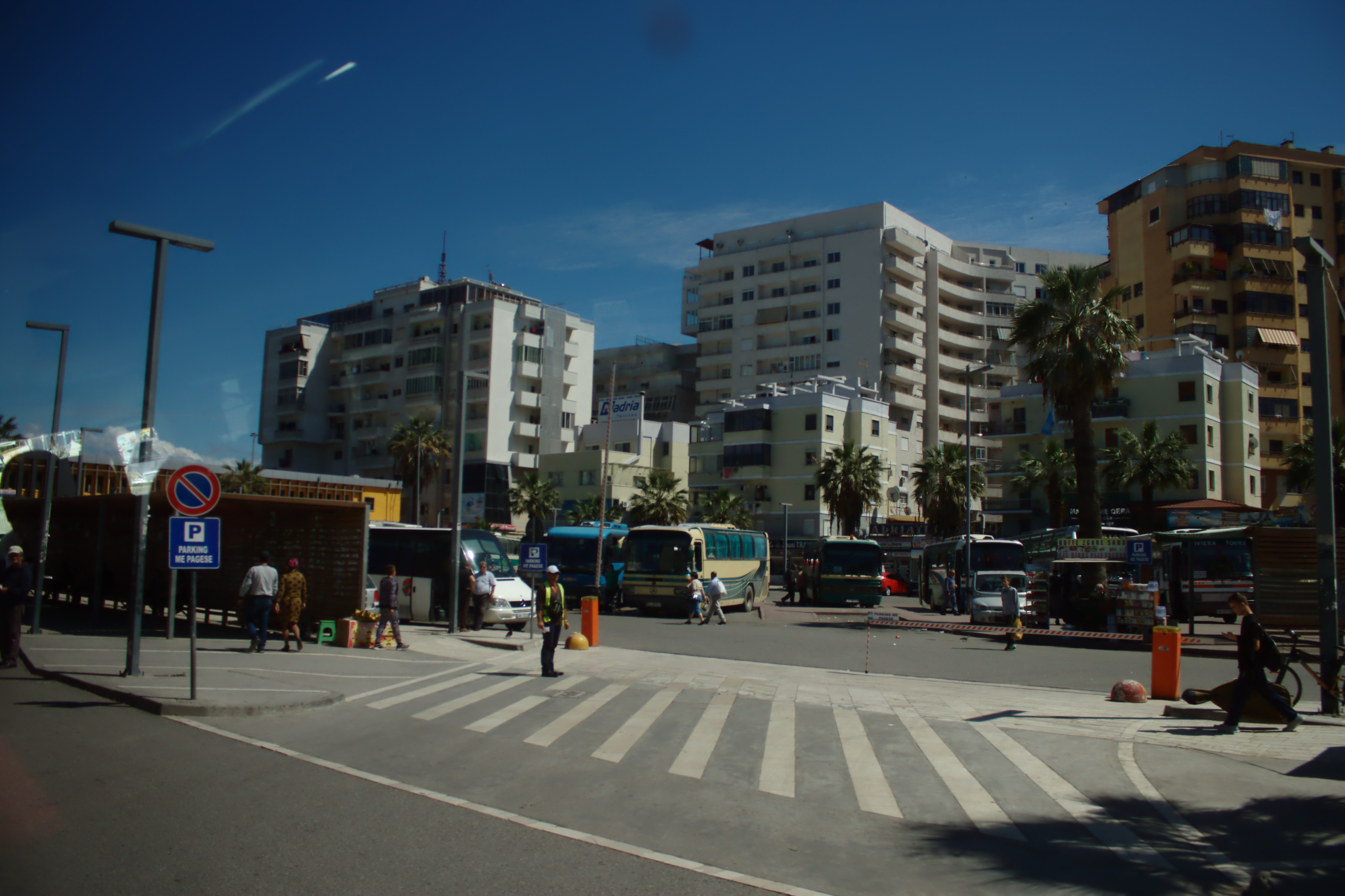
Durrës Central Bus Station. Intercity buses in Tirana no longer park on street sides. New temporary bus terminals have been built at the Kamza Overpass, Student City, and near Zogu Zi Square in anticipation of the two new Tirana Multimodal Bus Terminals planned near Kamza Overpass and TEG Shopping Center

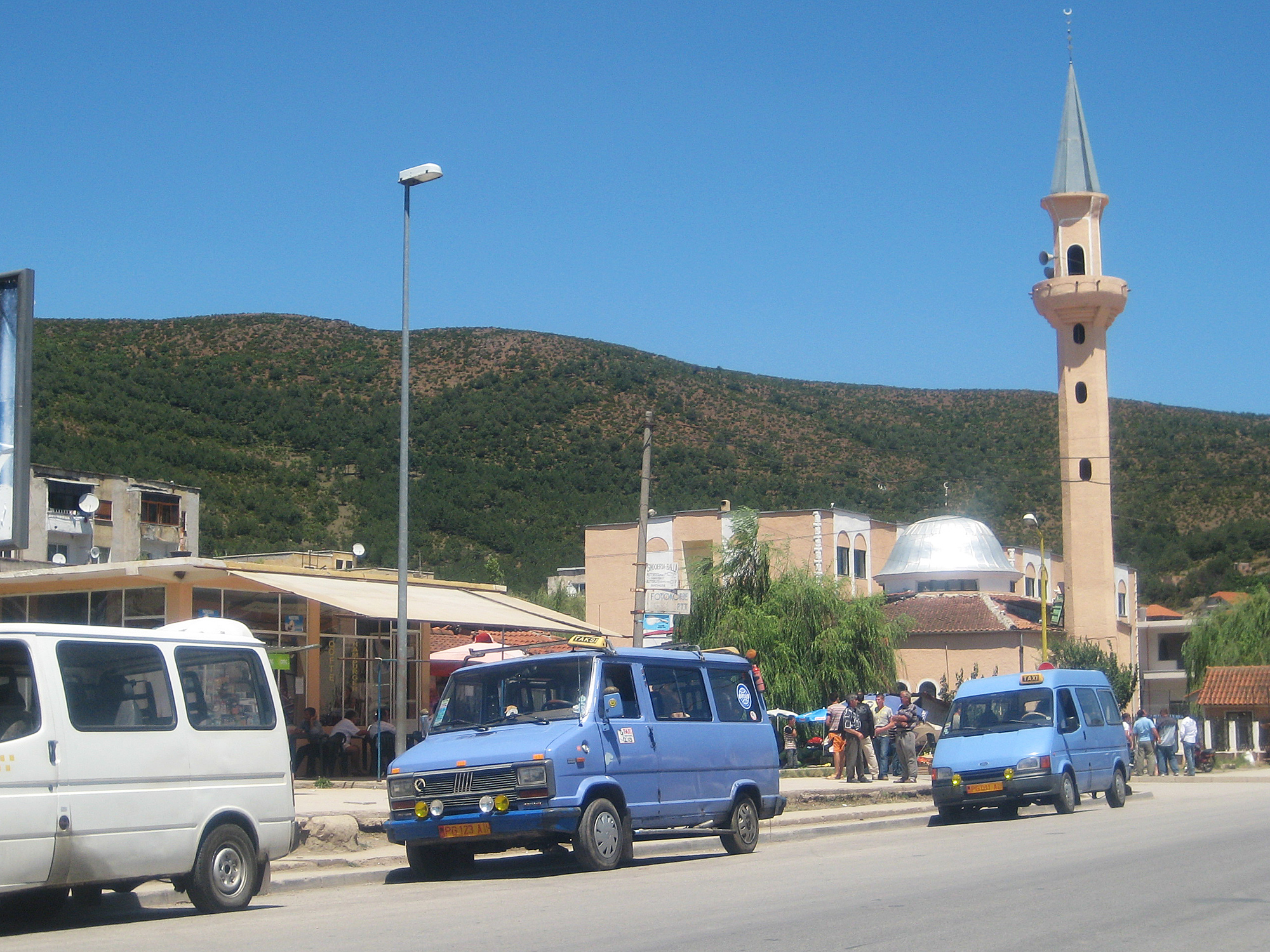
Furgons or mini buses are common between cities though they have been mostly phased out in Albania

Public transport in Albania is mainly characterized by the use of furgons, the equivalent of minibuses, vans or shuttles identifiable by yellow plates. They are convenient but do not follow fixed schedules, depart when are full, and are not usually equipped with A/C. Prices might be negotiated with the driver before departing. Bus transport is also available.

Tirana, the capital city does not have yet a central bus station. Minibuses and buses drop off and pick up passengers from various fixed places around the city and en route.

In anticipation of the construction of the two new Multi-Modal Terminals of Tirana near the Kamza Overpass at the western entrance of Tirana, and at the southeastern entrance of the city near TEG Shopping Center, the Municipality of Tirana has opened three temporary bus terminals to regulate the chaos of public transport between towns in Tirana as follows:

- Northern and Southern Albania Regional Bus Terminal (including Durres) at Kamza Overpass (Kthesa e Kamzes) on the site of the future Tirana Terminal
- Kosovo and International Lines Bus Terminal on Dritan Hoxha St behind Asllan Rusi Sports Palace
- Southeastern Albania Regional Bus Terminal at Student City (Qyteti Studenti) in southeastern Tirana

== Driving in Albania ==
Despite the perceived negative connotation to driving in Albania, most vehicles manage not to get into accidents by simply exercising common sense, and following their own way through the chaotic traffic. The law of the strongest fully applies on the Albanian roads. In cities, traffic is slow thus more secure than in rural areas. Expect reckless driving such as hair-raising overtaking even on turns, driving on the wrong side of the road, stopping on highways by the road side, uncontrolled crossing of cars, horse-drawn carts and pedestrians, and complete ignoring of stop signs and right of way at intersections. Albanian drivers are prone to using visual and acoustic aids regularly such as honking, headlight flashing, or high beams at night. Daytime running lamps must be activated outside urban areas. It is strongly recommended to have an up-to-date GPS, as many new roads have been recently added to the Albanian road network. In case the GPS does not work, its good to have an alternative paper or internet-based map. Street names on the ground do not always coincide with maps, as the current address system has only recently been introduced. In the mountains, some roads can be narrow and windy with hairpins/serpentines and some missing guardrails. Drivers are encouraged to check engine liquid levels to avoid overheating in the summer months. Some roads still have few road signs or misleading ones. Its strongly advised to always keep a spare tire.

As vehicles more than doubled in recent years, traffic fatalities have increased especially in a country where private car ownership was banned until the early 1990s. Some experts also attribute the increase to the above road structural problems, lack of buckling up, the use of alcohol, excessive speed, and unaccustomed drivers such as expats returning home. In an effort to curb such a phenomenon, mobile police patrols have been deployed, road signage improved, and speed radars installed on major roadways and city intersections.

Registered road vehicles as of 2023:

Vehicle	Number
Cars	753,252
Motorcycles	54,968
Trucks	21,520
Buses	8,603
Trailers	10,455
Agricultural machinery	3204
Construction vehicles	1,201
Motor-homes & Caravans	367
Other	14,195
Total	867,765

Car rental is a common option for tourists visiting Albania, particularly for independent travel between major cities, coastal destinations, and archaeological or rural areas where public transport may be limited.

== Biking in Albania ==
Prior to the fall of communism in Albania, most people didn't have private cars. The capital Tirana had dropped dramatically to a 3% bicycle modeshare as of 2014, but has a bikeshare program working to revive bicycling. Today, Shkodër is the bicycle capital of Albania, with 30% of people biking as of 2016.

== See also ==
- Economy of Albania
- Driving licence in Albania
- Vehicle registration plates of Albania
- Road signs in Albania
