= Port of Shëngjin =

Port in Albania

Coordinates: 41°48′20″N 19°35′35″E

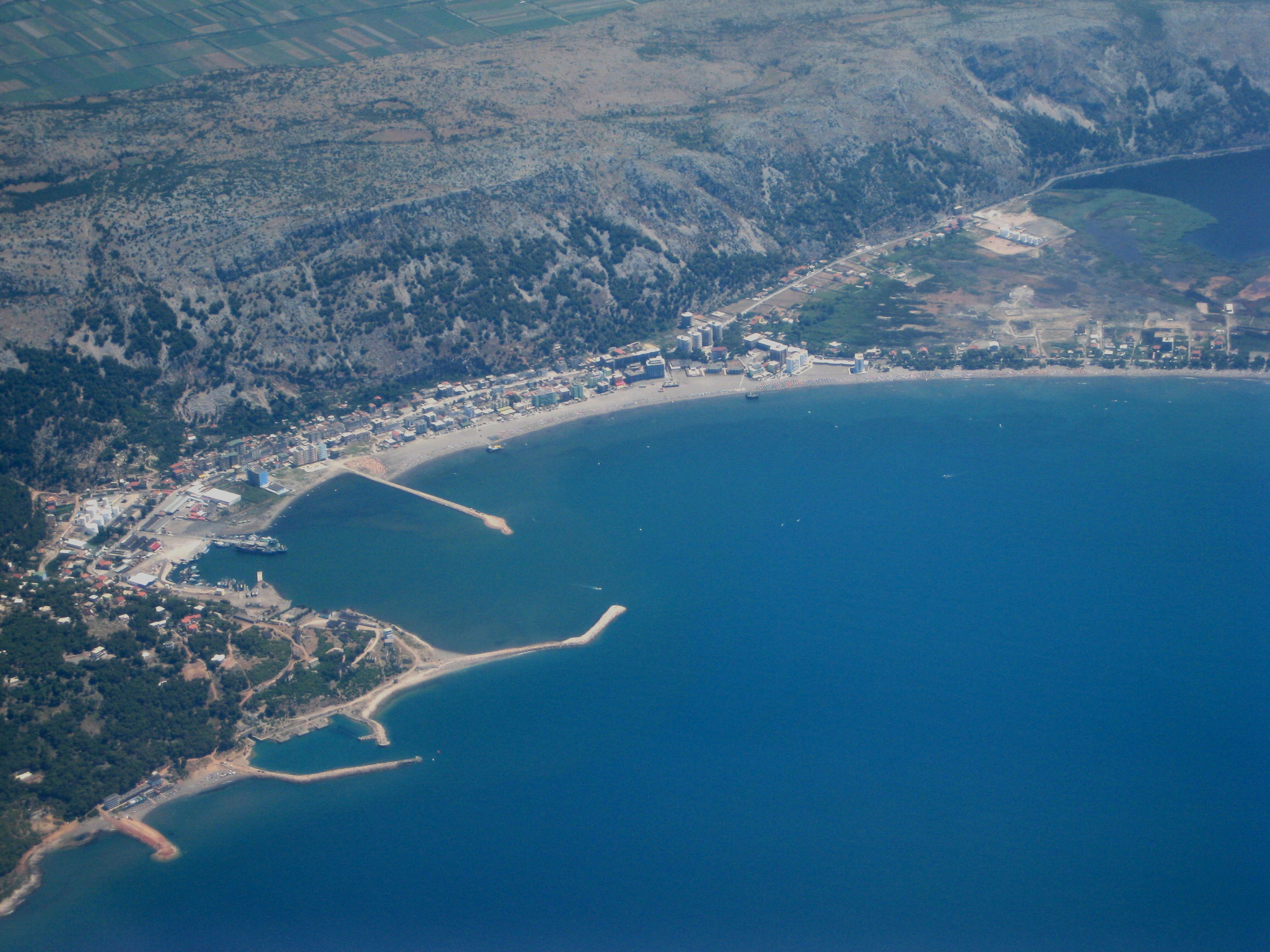
Shengjin Port

The Port of Shëngjin or Shëngjin Harbor (Albanian: Porti i Shëngjinit) is a port of Albania in the city of Shëngjin, Albania.

UN/LOCODE - ALDRZ

Water Depth - Channel 11 - 15 feet (3.4 - 4.6 meters), Cargo Pier 26 - 30 feet (7.1 - 9.1 meters).

Anchorage - 46 - 50 feet (14 - 15.2 meters)

== See also ==
- Port of Durrës
- Port of Vlorë
- Port of Sarandë
- Orikum Marina
- Albania
