= Road signs in Albania =

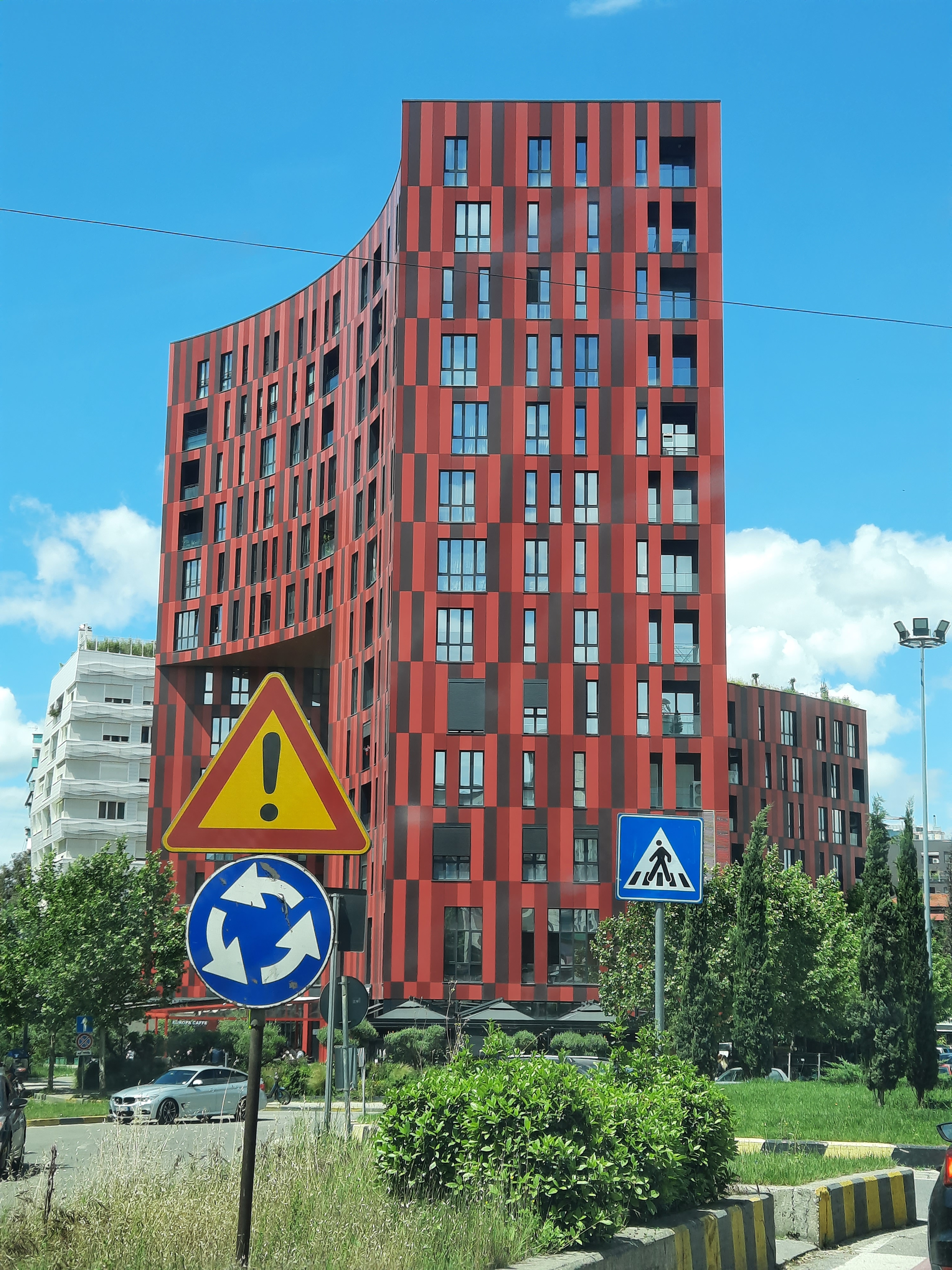
Road signs in Tirana

Albania is a signatory to the Vienna Convention on Road Signs and Signals. Therefore, road signs do not differ much from the rest of Europe, such as Italy, San Marino, Montenegro and Kosovo. The Ministry of Infrastructure and Energy regulates them. Albania drives on the right as with the rest of Europe, except for Cyprus, Ireland, Malta and the United Kingdom. Although Albania is not a member of the European Union, the road signs largely follow the general European conventions concerning the use of shape and colour to indicate their function.

== Warning signs ==
Warning signs (Albanian: sinjale paralajmëruese) are used to warn road users of the danger that threatens them in a certain place, or part of the road, and to inform them about the nature of that danger. Warning signs are predominantly red and white in color. They include:

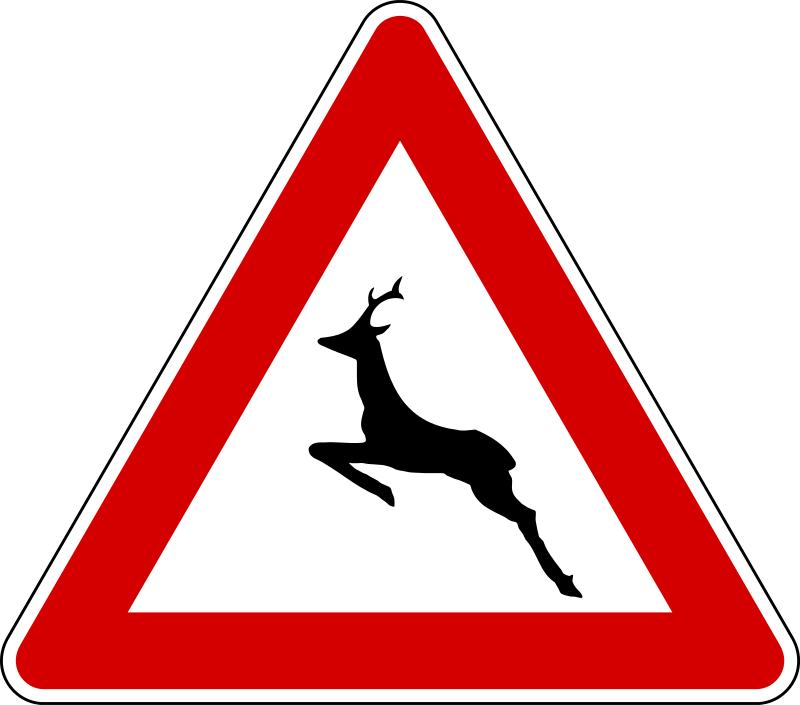
Deer on road ahead

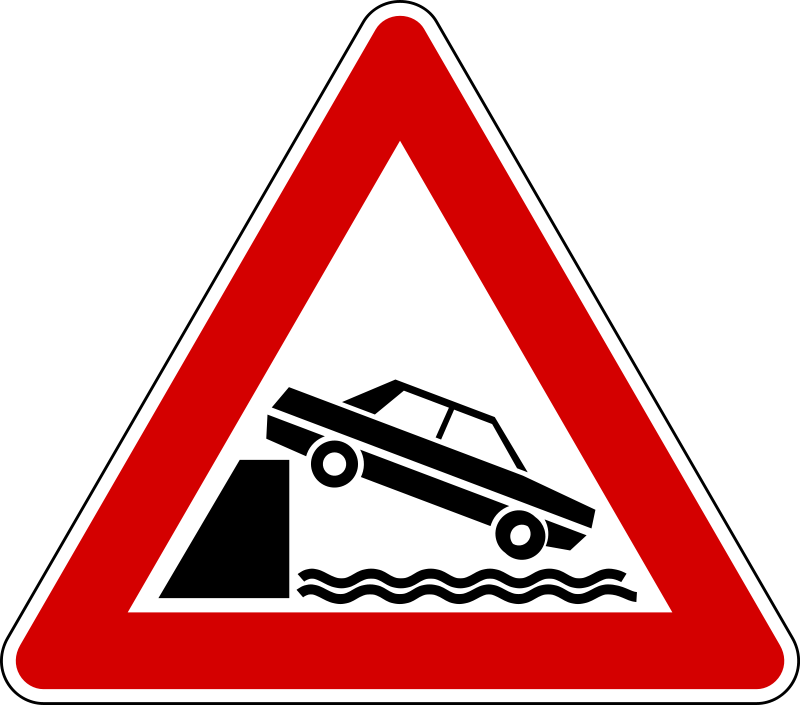
Unprotected quayside or riverbank

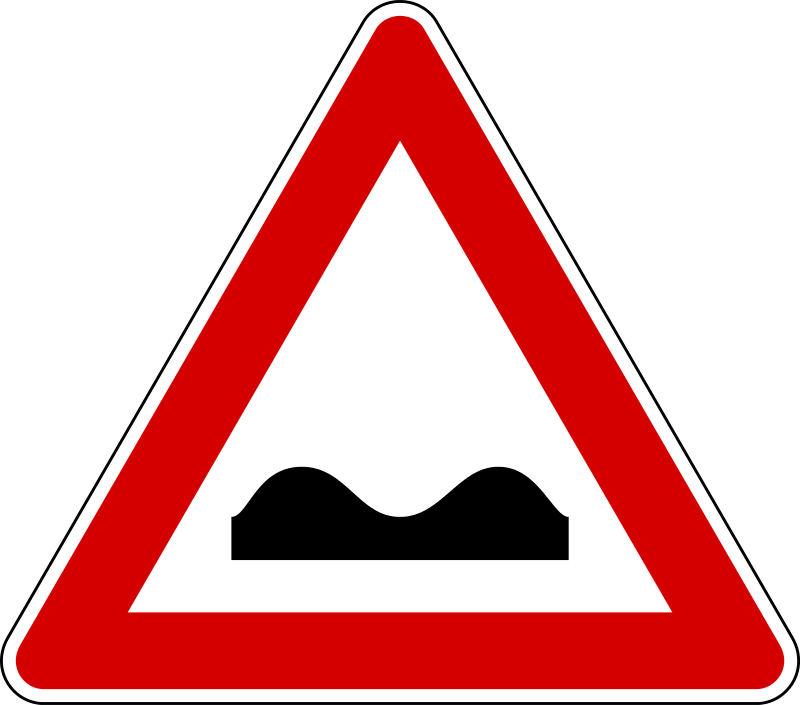
Uneven road or series of bumps ahead

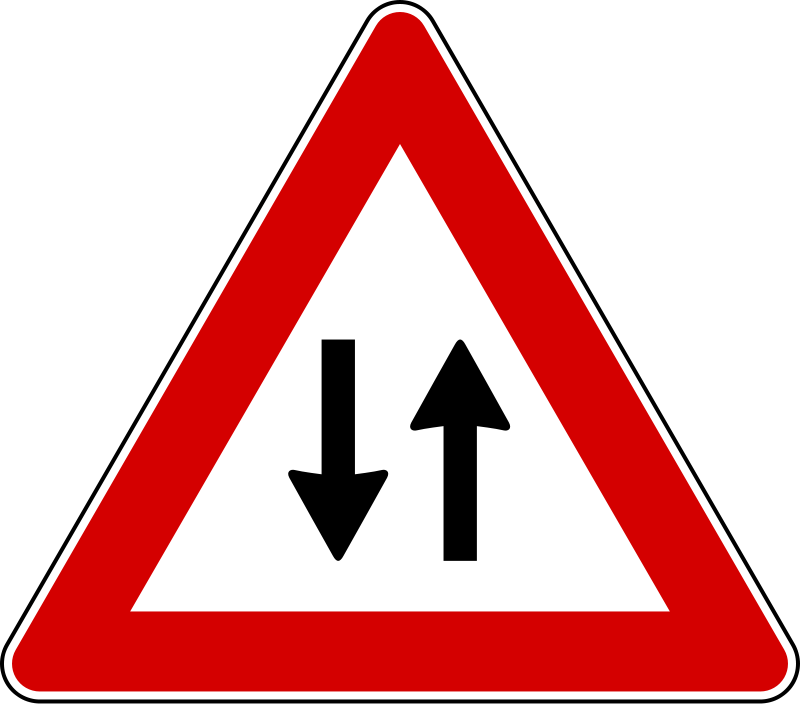
Two-way traffic ahead

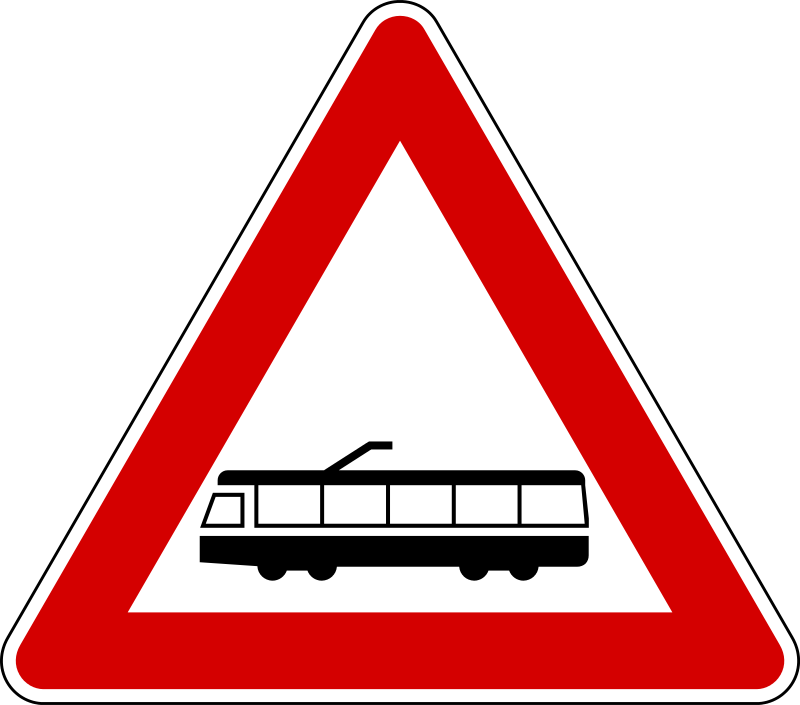
Tram crossing

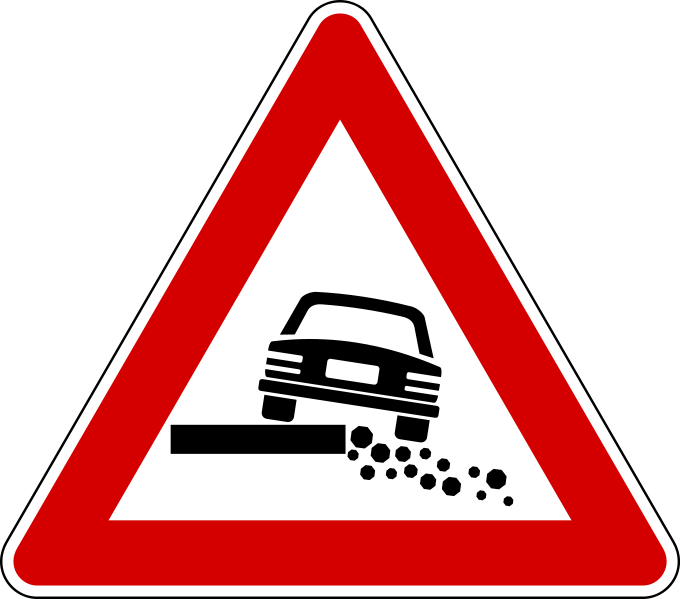
Soft verges

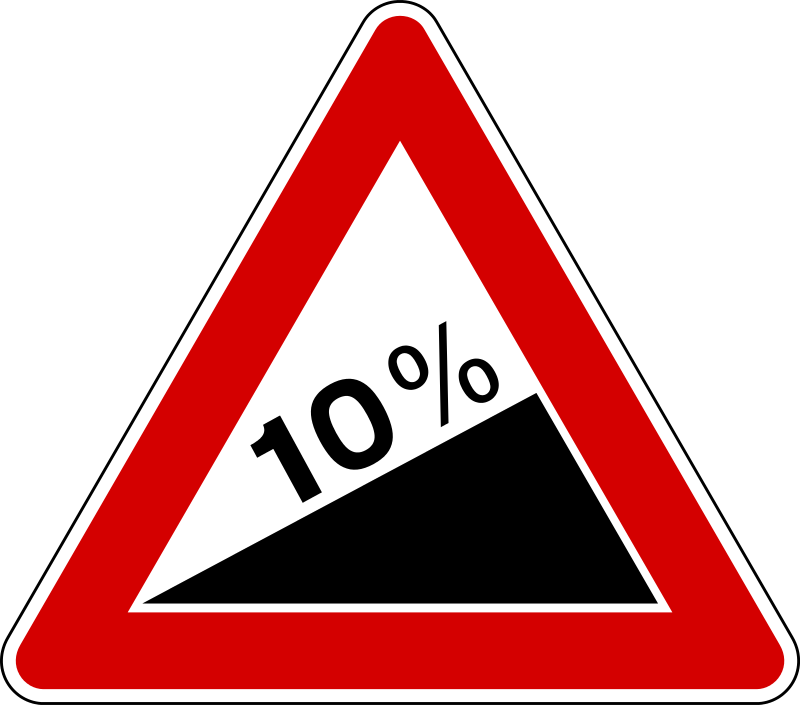
Steep ascent

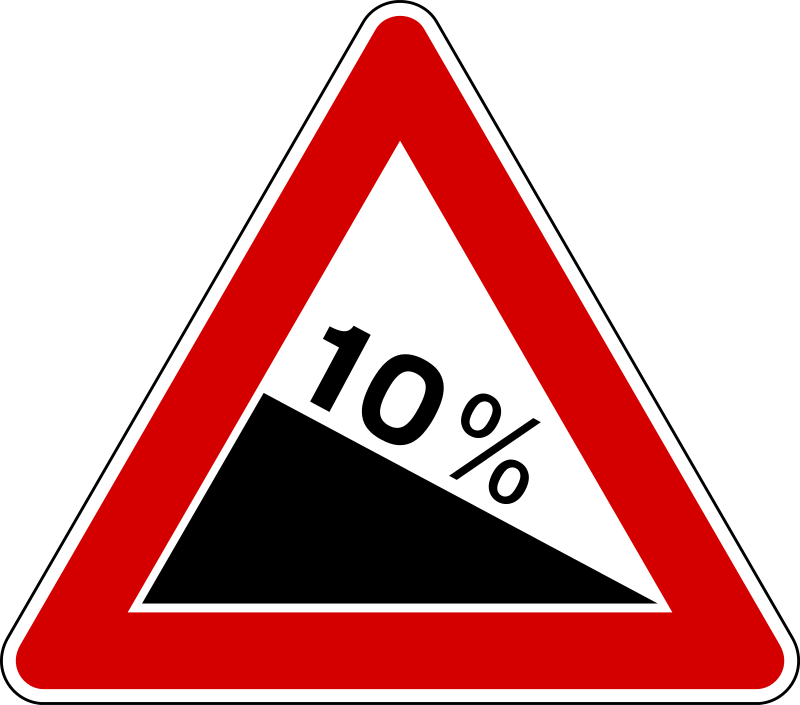
Steep descent

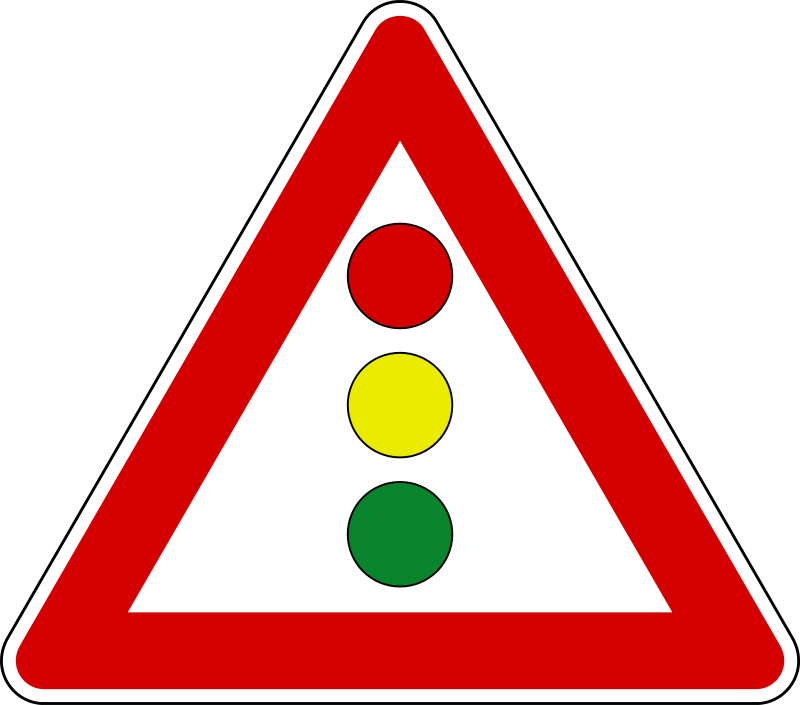
Traffic signals ahead

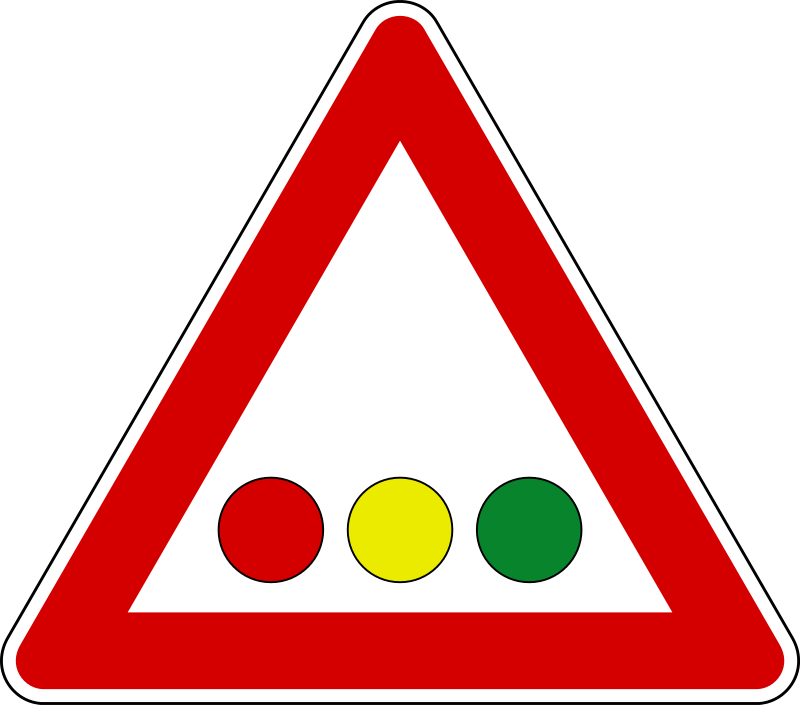
Traffic signals ahead (horizontal)

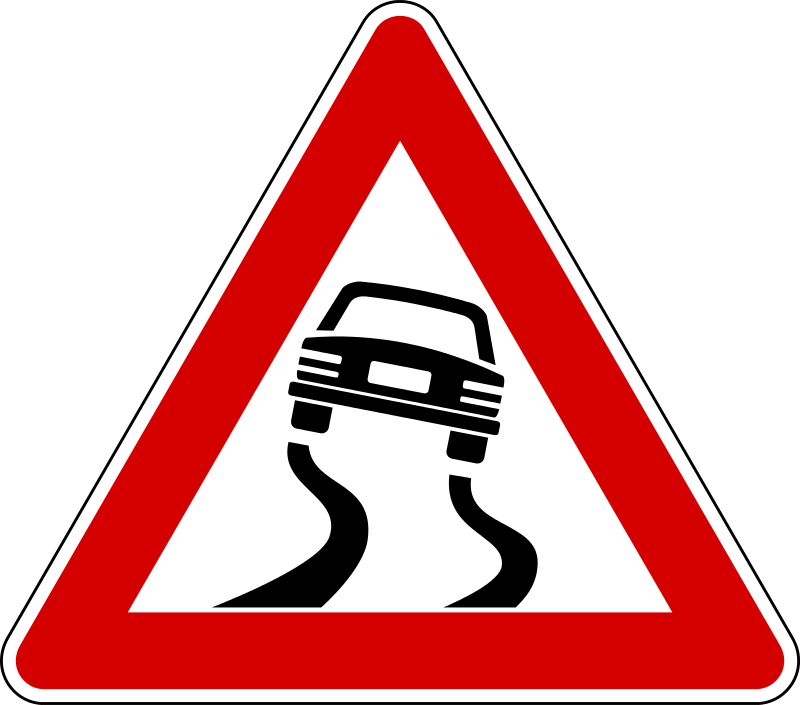
Slippery road surface

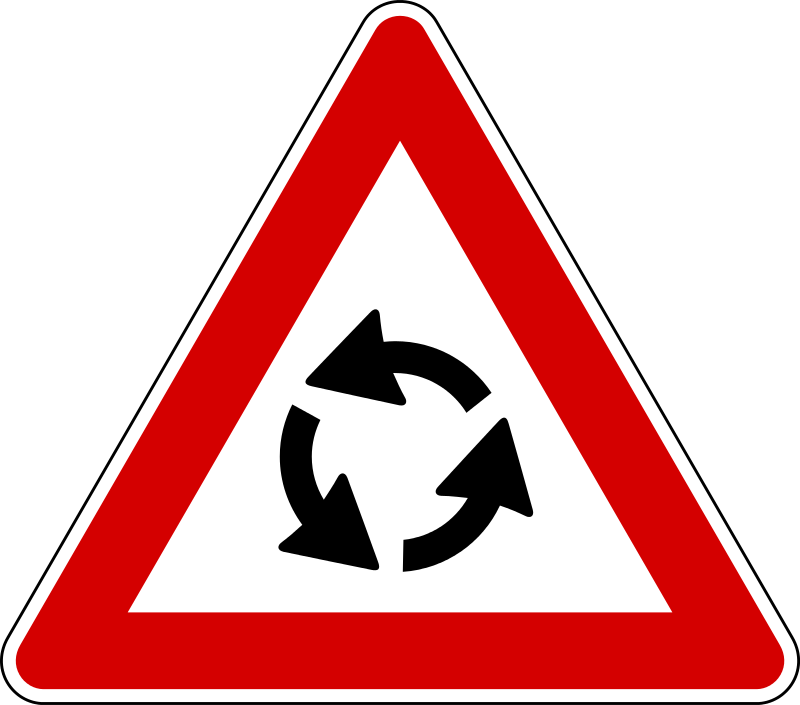
Roundabout ahead

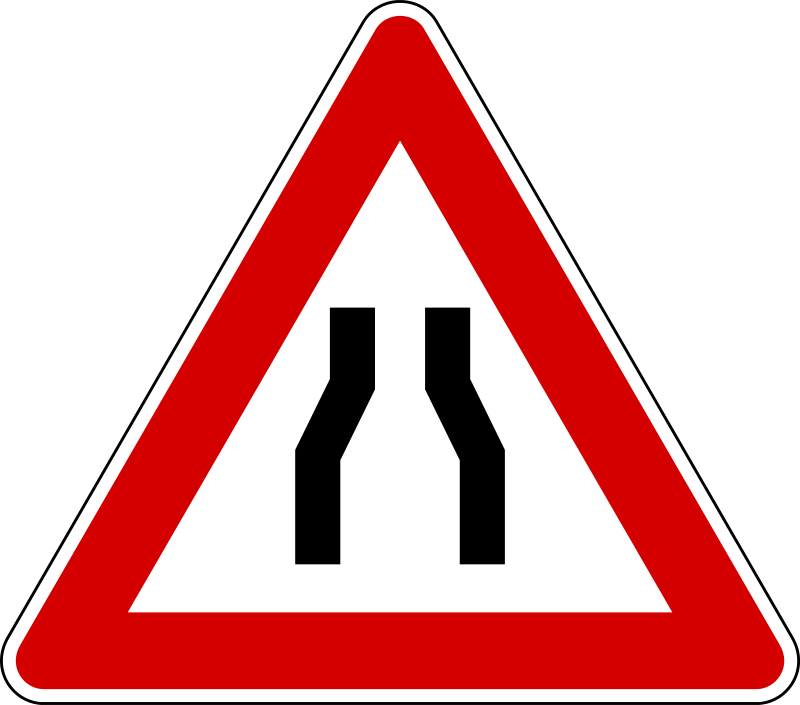
Road narrows on both sides

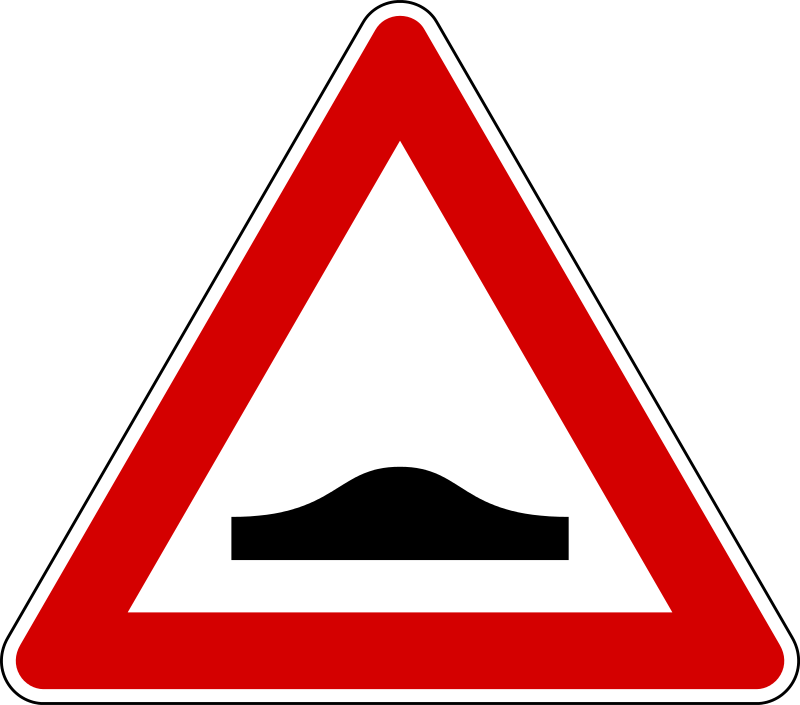
Road hump ahead

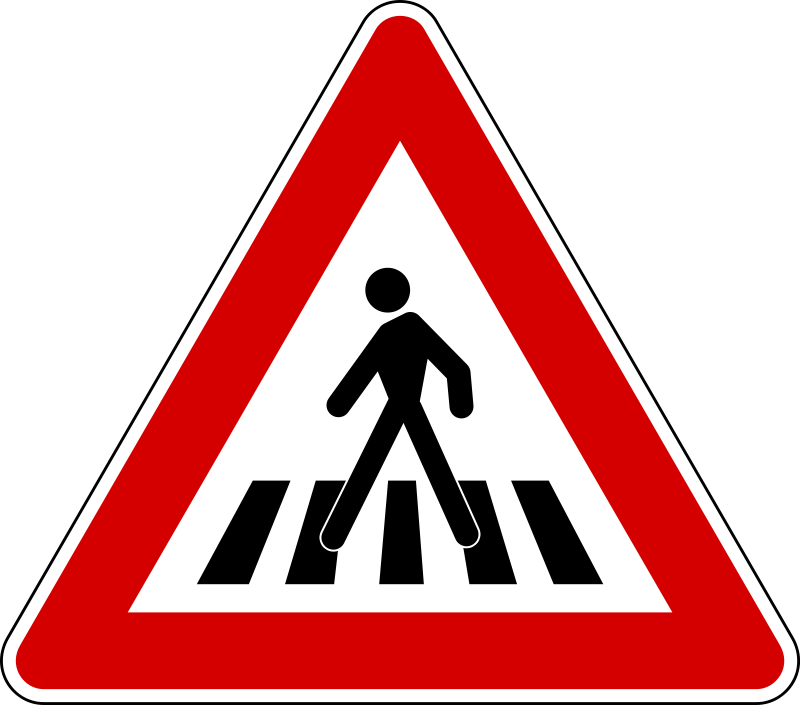
Pedestrian crossing ahead

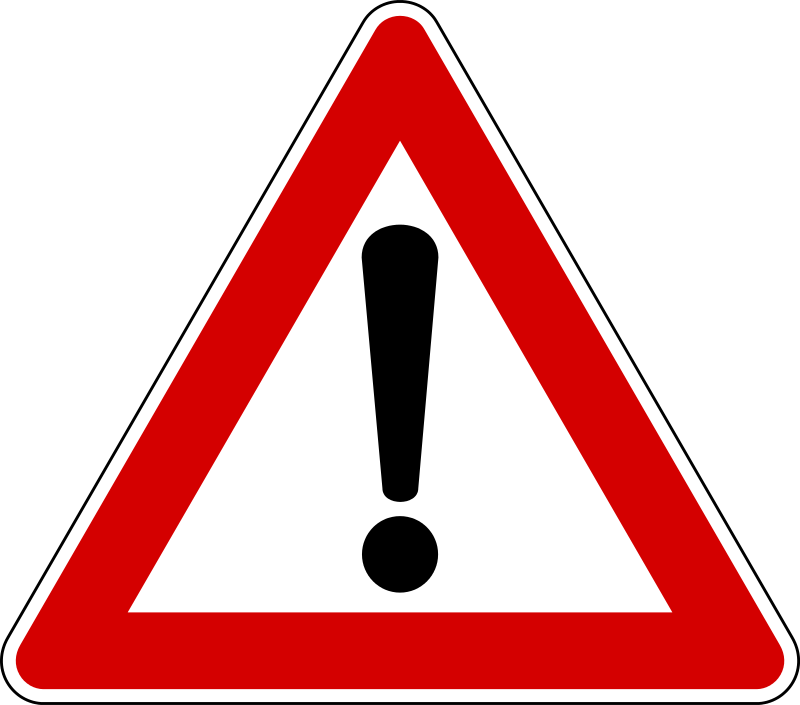
Other dangers

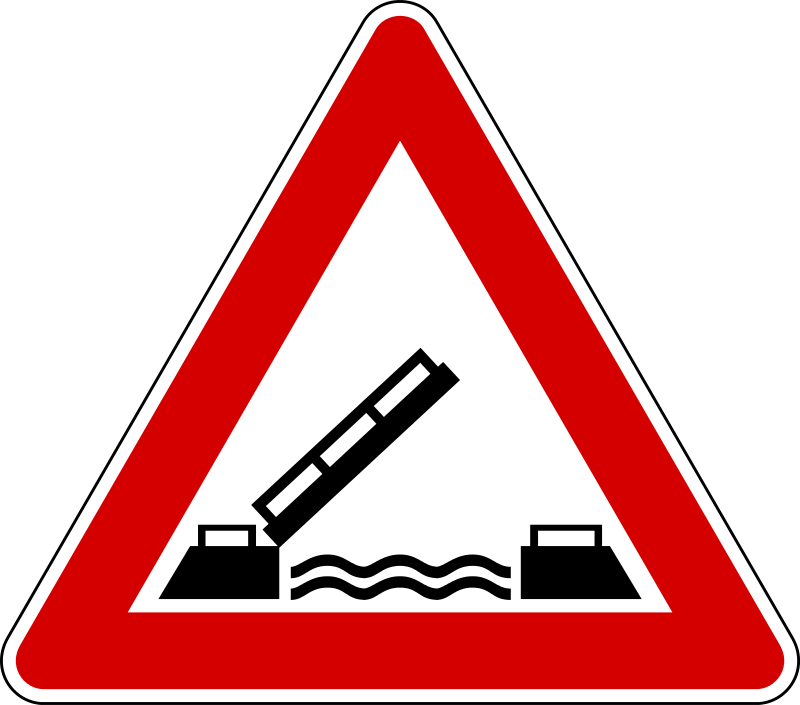
Opening or swing bridge

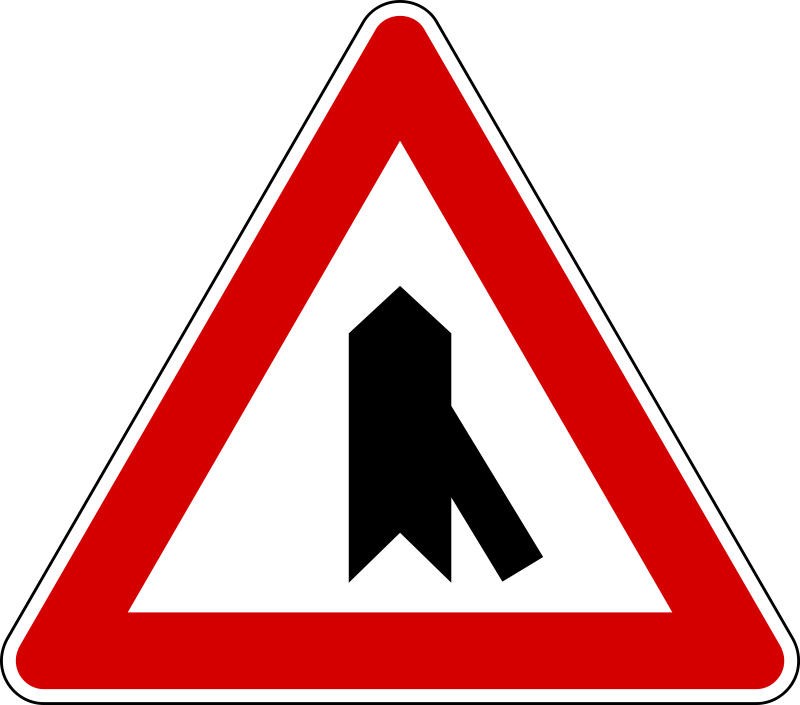
Merging traffic

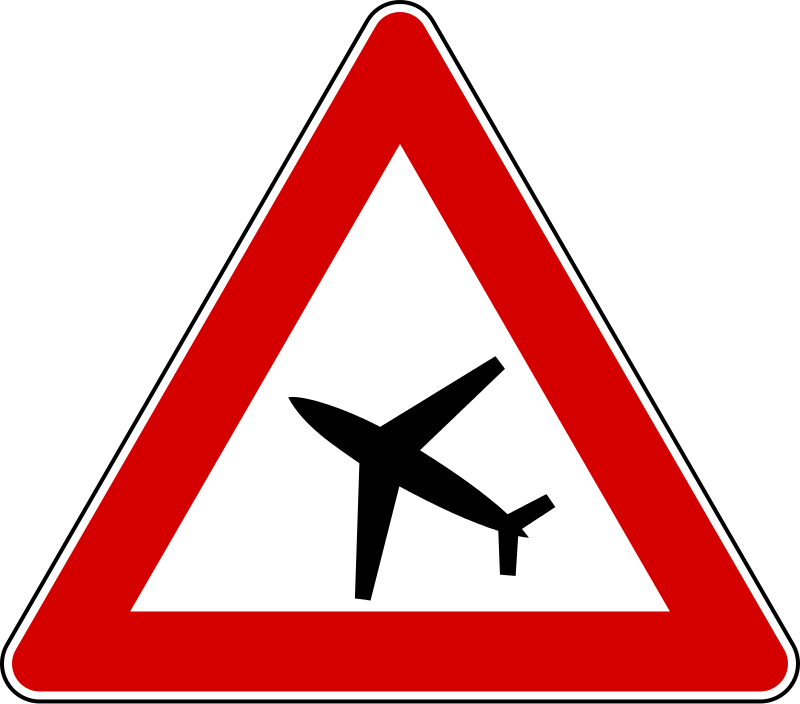
Low-flying aircraft

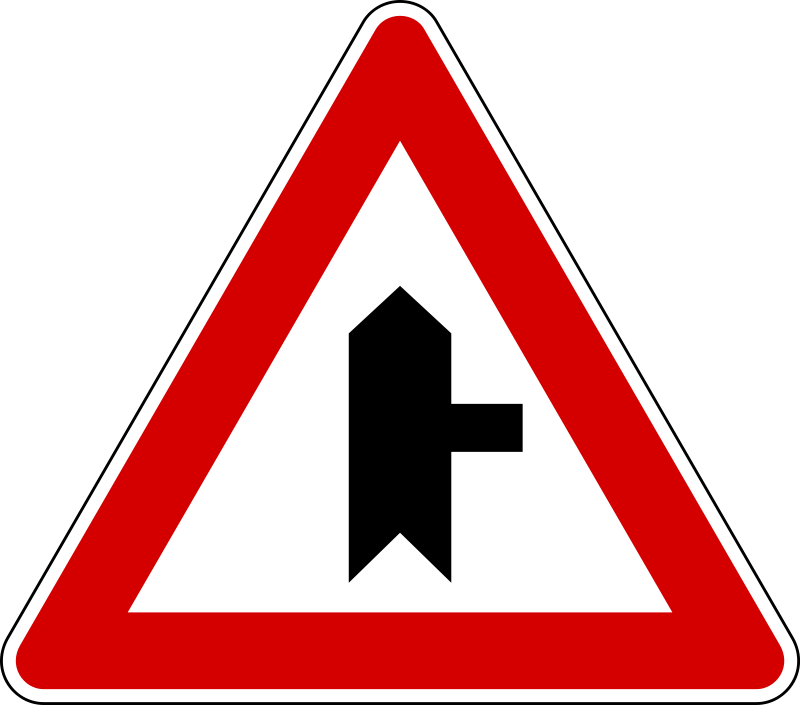
Junction with a minor road

Level crossing (multiple tracks)

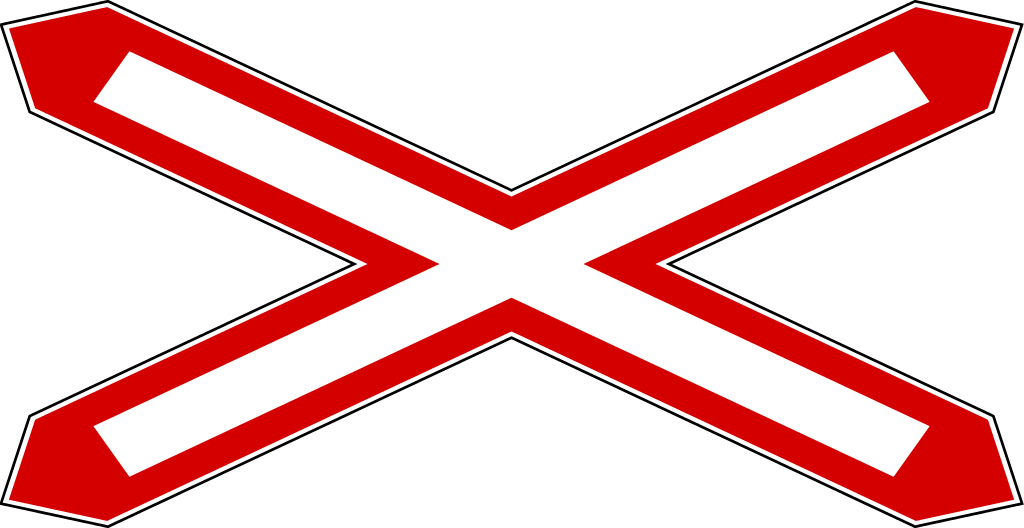
Level crossing (one track)

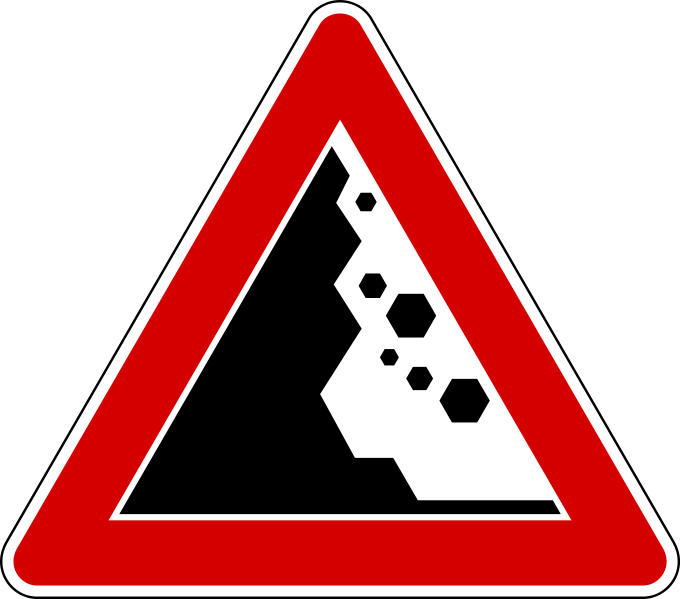
Falling rocks or debris

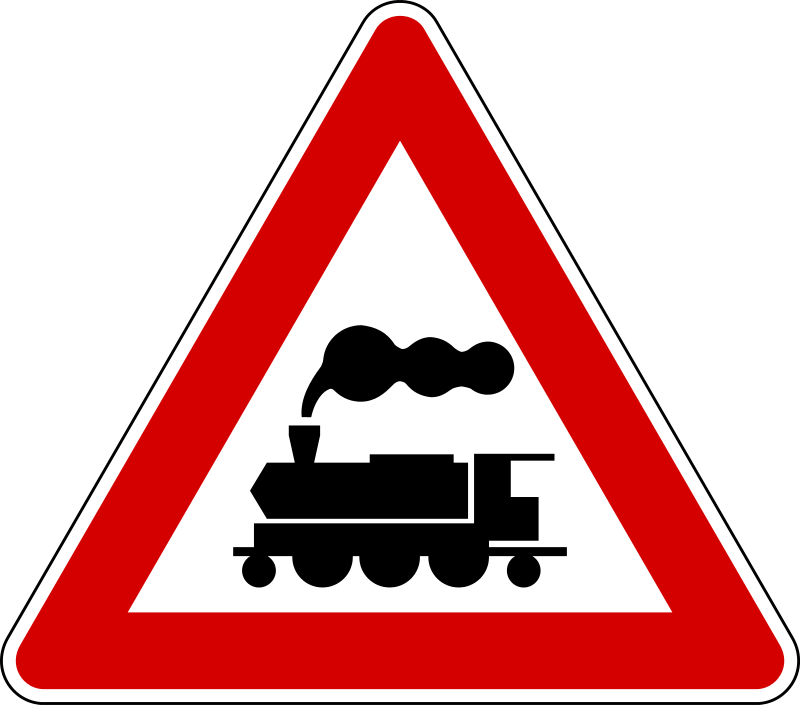
Level crossing without barriers ahead

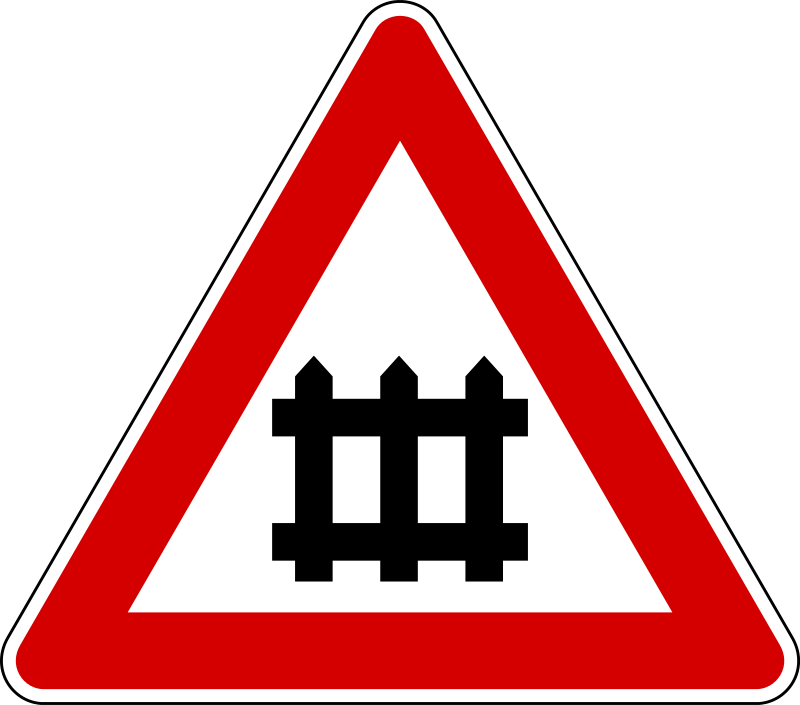
Level crossing with barriers ahead

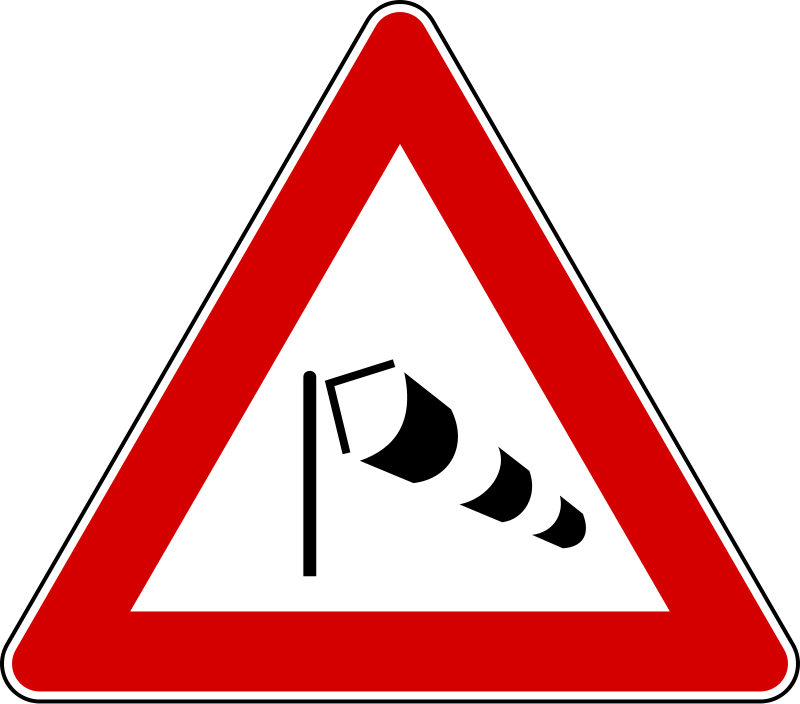
Dangerous crosswinds

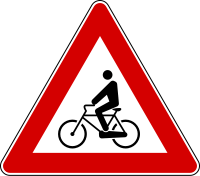
Cyclists ahead

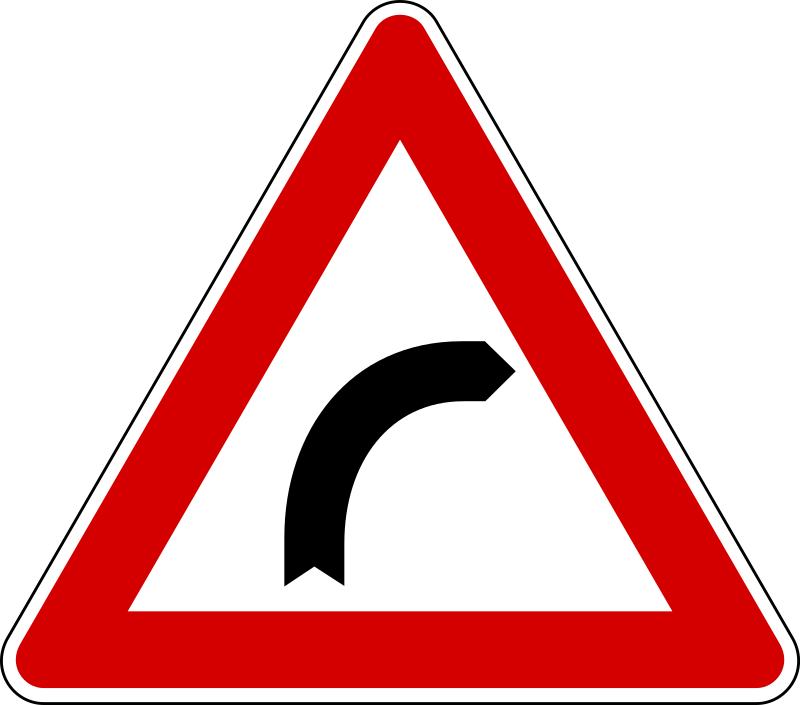
Curve ahead

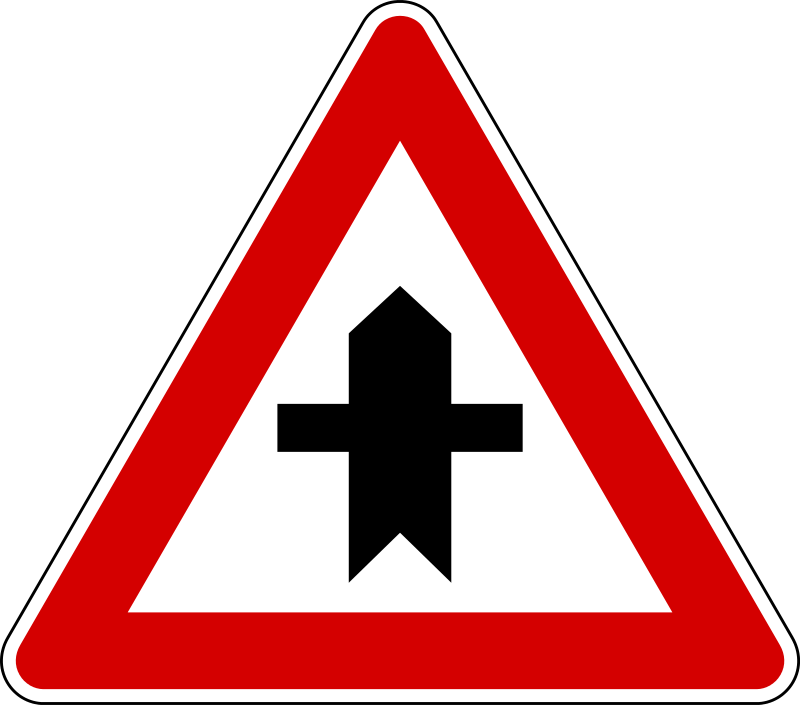
Crossroads with a minor road

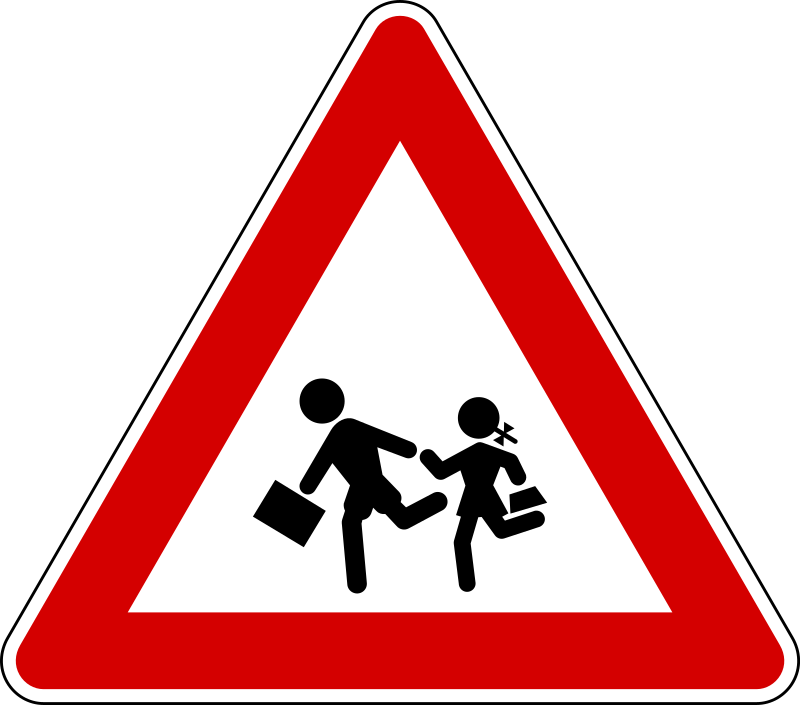
Children

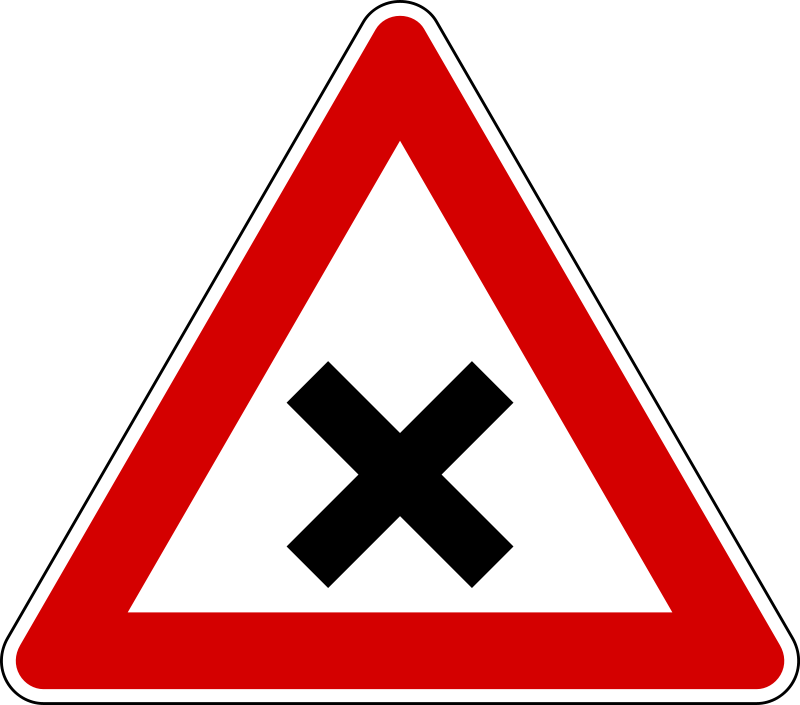
Crossroads with priority to the right

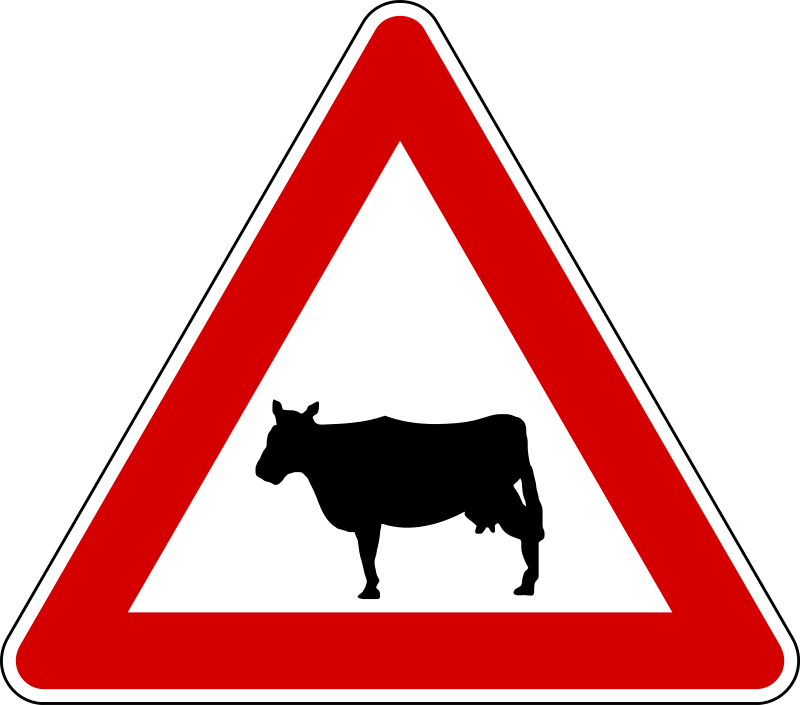
Cows on road ahead

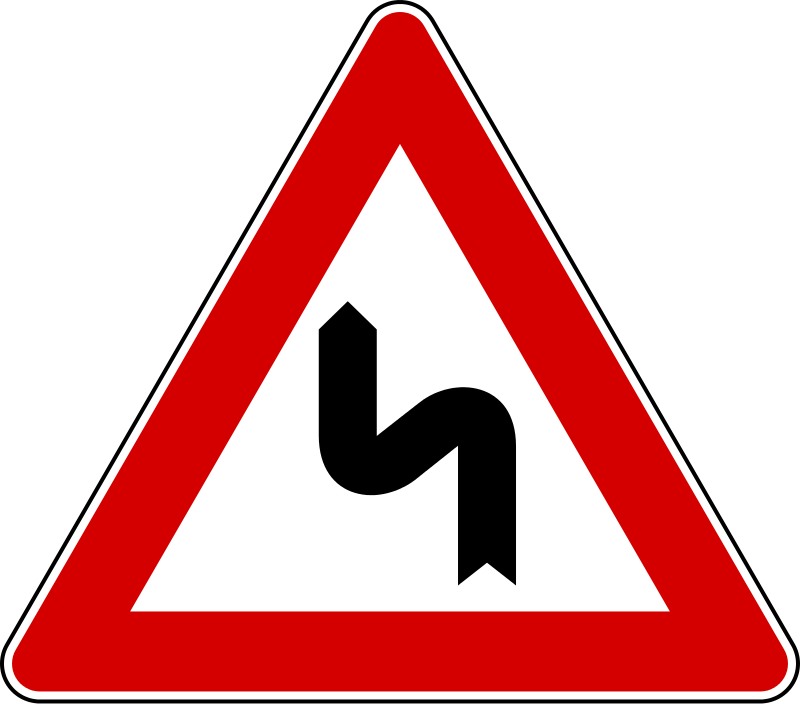
Double curve ahead

== Temporary signs ==
Temporary signs (Albanian: sinjale të përkohëshme) are used to notify road users of a problem they will face while driving in certain place during a limited period of time, such as during construction activities on the road or damaged parts of it. Warning signs are predominantly red and yellow in color. They include:

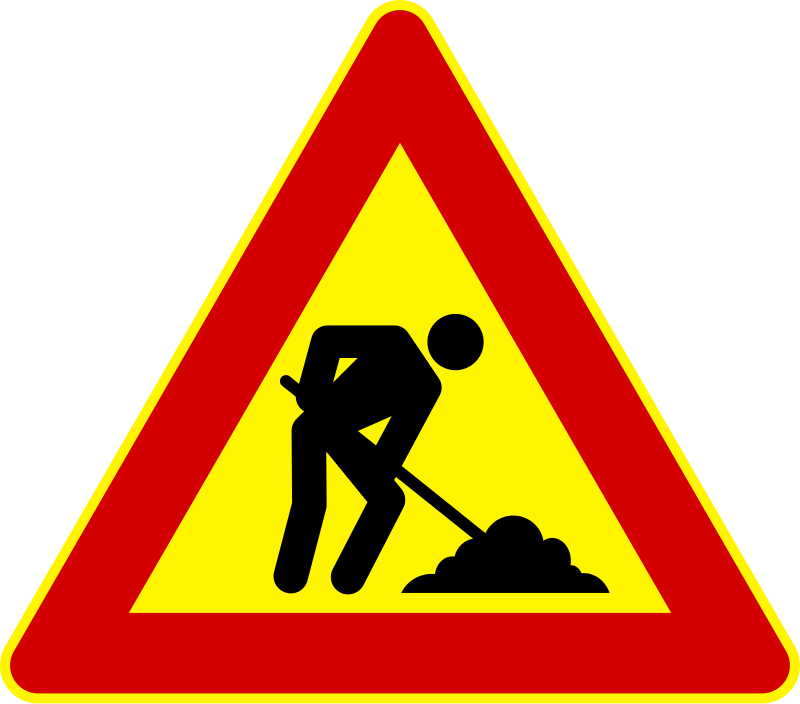
Road works

Road narrows

Road narrows on left

Road narrows on right

Two-way traffic

Other dangers

Uneven road

Loose chippings

Traffic lights

== Regulatory signs ==
=== Priority signs ===
Priority signs (Albanian: sinjale të prioritetit) are used to indicate the order in which vehicles shall pass intersection points. They include:

Give Way

Stop and give way

Crossroads with right-of-way from the right

Give priority to vehicles from opposite direction

Priority road

End of priority road

Crossroads

Junction with a minor side-road from right

Junction with a minor side-road from left

Merging traffic from right

Merging traffic from left

Traffic has priority over oncoming vehicles

=== Prohibition signs ===
Prohibition signs (Albanian: sinjale të ndalimit) are used to warn of prohibitions imposed on those who want to use the road. They include:

No entry for vehicular traffic

Restricted vehicular access

No overtaking

Minimum distance

Maximum speed 50km/h

No use of horns

No overtaking by heavy goods vehicles

No animal-drawn vehicles

No pedestrians

No bicycles

No motorcycles

No handcarts

No motor vehicles

No buses

No large goods vehicles

No large goods vehicles over weight shown

No vehicles with trailer

No tractors

No vehicles carrying dangerous goods

No vehicles carrying explosives or flammable goods

No vehicles carrying goods which could pollute water

No vehicles over width shown

No vehicles over height shown

No vehicles over length shown

Maximum weight in tonnes

Axle weight limit in tonnes

Derestriction

End of maximum speed

End of no overtaking

End of no overtaking by heavy goods vehicles

No parking on side where sign is placed.

No stopping on the side where sign is placed

Parking space reserved for vehicles used by people with disabilities

Parking place

Parking ahead in the direction of the arrow

=== Mandatory signs ===
Mandatory signs (Albanian: sinjale të detyrueshme) are used to warn of conditions imposed on those who want to use the road. They predominantly use blue and white. They include:

Drive straight

Turn left

Turn right

Right turn only ahead

Left turn only ahead

Right or left turn only ahead

Drive straight or turn right

Drive straight or turn left

Keep left

Keep right

Pass either side

Roundabout

Minimum speed

End of minimum speed

Snow chains compulsory

Pedestrian lane

End of pedestrian lane

Cycle lane

End of cycle lane

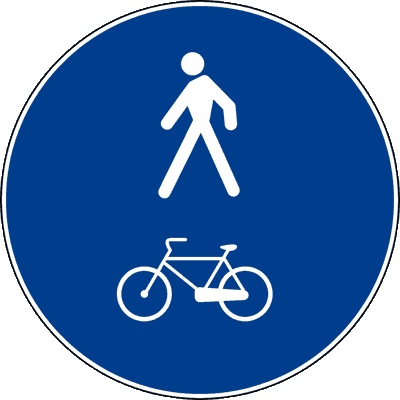
Shared path

End of shared path

Segregated pedestrian and cycle path

End of segregated pedestrian and cycle path

Bridleway

End of bridleway

Stop, pay toll

Stop, police check

== Indication signs ==
Indication signs (Albanian: sinjale shpjeguese) are used to provide additional information to the road's users. They include:

Hospital

Pedestrian crossing

Pedestrian underpass

Pedestrian overpass

Pedestrian ramp

No through road

No through road (side road)

Advisory speed limit

End of advisory speed limit

Fast-traffic highway, only motor vehicles allowed

End of road reserved for motor vehicles

Tunnel (roads other than motorways)

Tunnel (motorways)

Bridge (roads other than motorways)

Bridge (motorways)

Bicycle crossing

Breakdown bay. The background is green on motorway

Use of lanes on extra-urban roads

Bus lane on urban road

Bus lane on urban road

Use of lanes on motorways

End of lane. The background is green on motorway

Increase in the number of lanes. The background is green on motorway

One-way traffic

Motorway starts

Motorway ends

Advised direction for trucks ahead

Advised direction for trucks

First aid

Repairs

Telephone (formerly used)

Petrol station

Petrol station with LPG

Bus stop

Tram stop

Information centre

Youth hostel

Picnic site

Camping site

Hotel

Refreshments

Restaurant

Taxi stop

General speed limit (installed at national borders)

Primary or secondary road direction

Intermediate highway location marker with hectometre shown in roman numerals (in the example the sign is placed at the kilometre 24.8 of the road)

Directions on a motorway

Exit directions on a motorway

European road number sign

Motorway location marker and distance from the exit shown (horizontal version)

Motorway ahead with a summary of transit restrictions

Town sign: start of urban area

== See also ==
- Transport in Albania
