= Port of Vlorë =

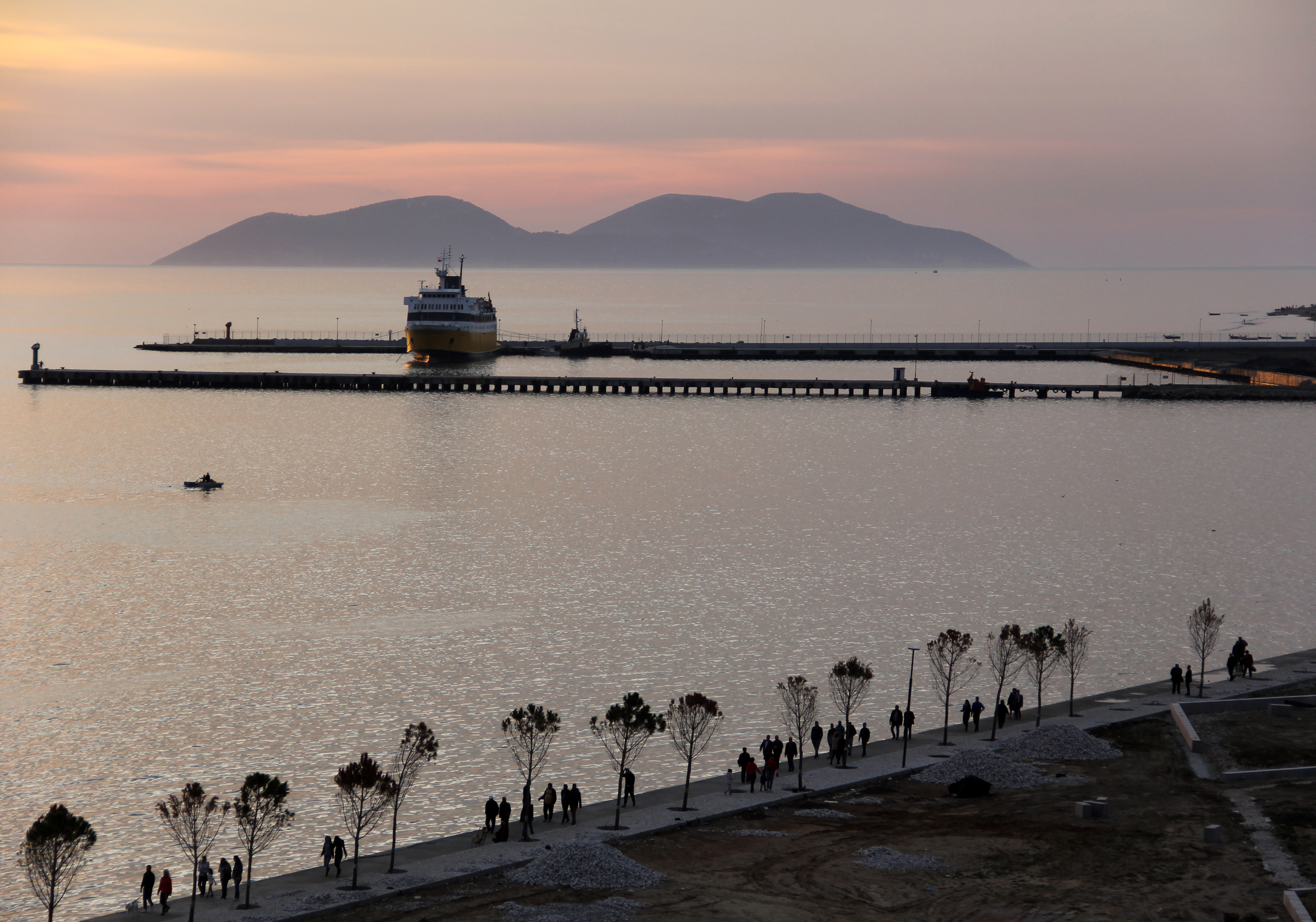

- Click on the map for a fullscreen view

Location
- Country: Albania
- Location: Vlorë, Albania
- Coordinates: 40°27′1″N 19°29′0″E
- UN/LOCODE: ALVOA

Details
- Owned by: Porti Detar Vlorë sh.a
- No. of berths: 9
- Draft depth: 11.0 m.
- Water Depth: Channel 31 - 35 feet (9.4 - 10 meters), Cargo Pier 16 - 20 feet (4.9 - 6.1 meters), Oil Terminal 31 - 35 feet (9.4 - 10 meters)
- Anchorage: 56 - 60 feet (17.1 - 18.2 meters)

Statistics
- Annual cargo tonnage: 34,768 tons (2018)
- Passenger traffic: 152,744 (2019)
- Website www.portivlore.com

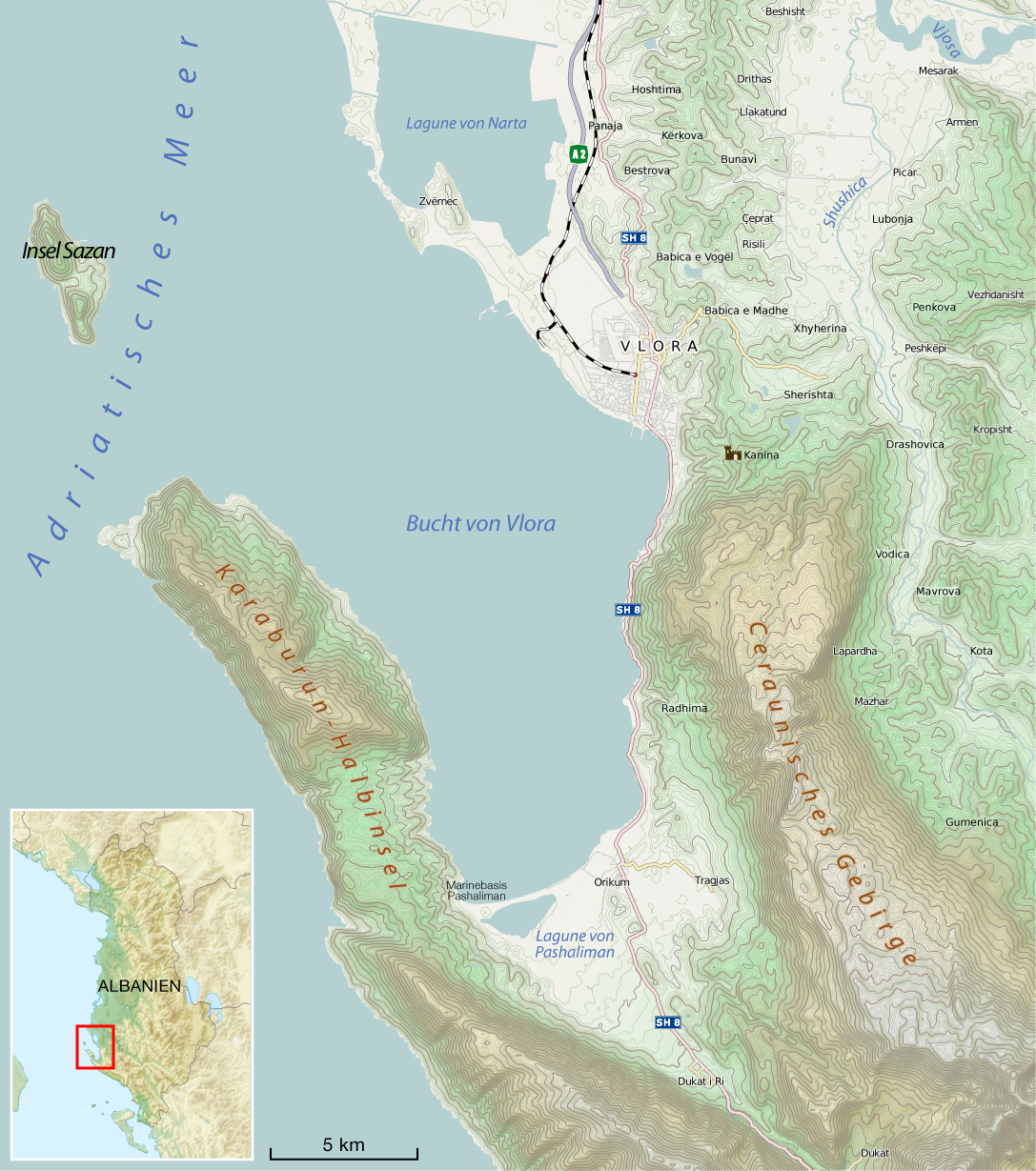
Map of the harbor

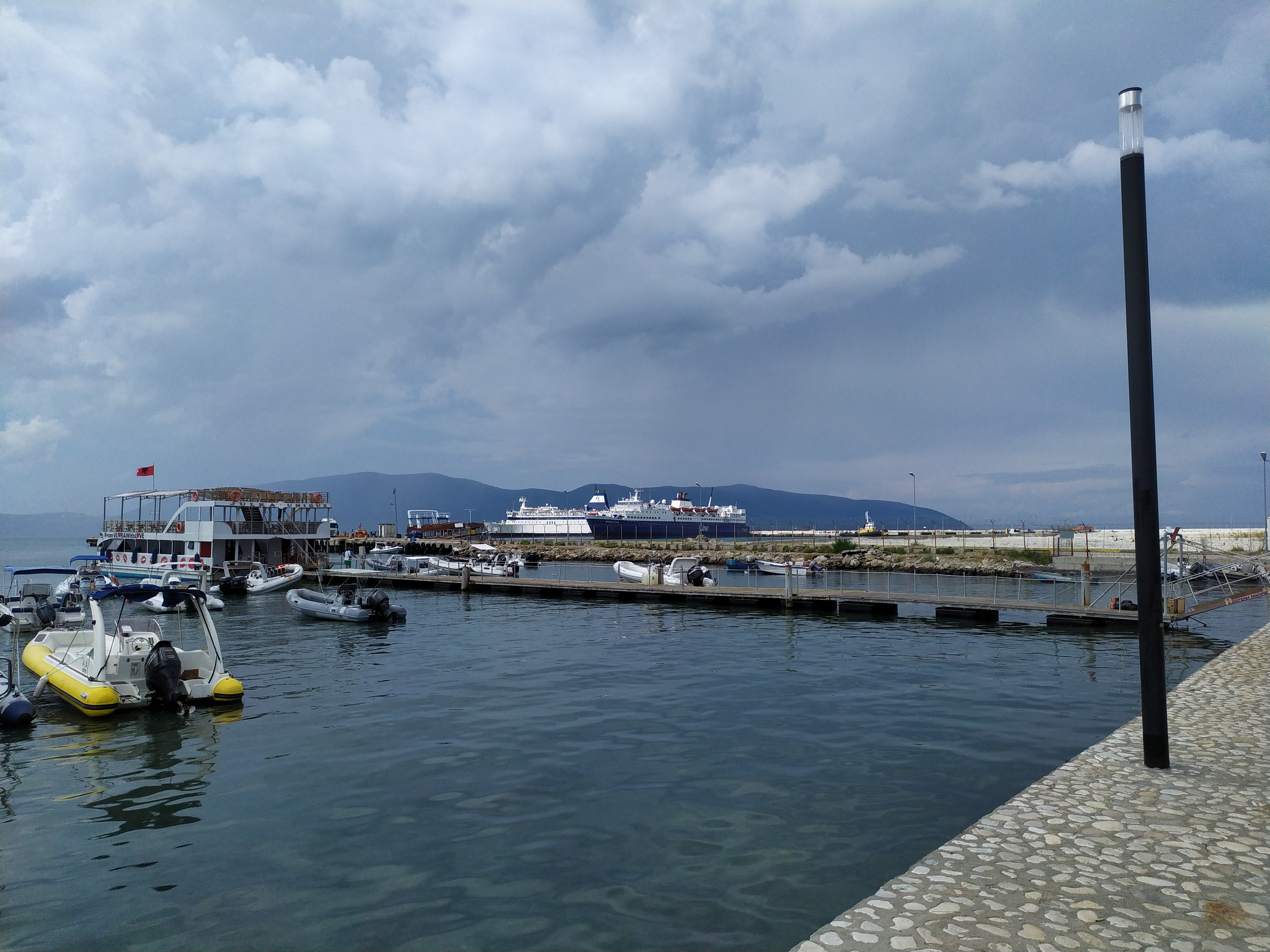
Harbor of Vlore

The Port of Vlorë or Vlorë Harbor (Albanian: Porti i Vlorës) is a port of Albania in the city of Vlorë, Albania. The Port of Vlora is the second largest in the country. Vlore comprises a dry cargo port, the Vlore 1 petroleum port and a fishing harbour. The Port is considered as part of the Lungomare Master Plan in Vlorë. Part of this project is the construction of a yacht port, while the new Trans-Balkan Road or Cultural Corridor, which has been completed, will be added a second segment that starts from the existing road to the port.

The fishing port of Vlorë or Vlora Fishing Harbor (Albanian: Porti i peshkimit Vlorë) is located in the city of Skel, near Vlorë. This will serve as the new location of the relocated Port of Vlore passenger terminal and cargo area while the Vlora Marina is being constructed.

In 2021, a UK-Albania joint venture company won a concession tender for the construction of the Vlora Marina on the grounds of the current passenger terminal area of Port of Vlore. The luxury marina project comprises docking areas for yachts, residential and hotel complex towers, and commercial areas such as bars and restaurants.

== See also ==
- Vlorë
- Transport in Albania
- Economy of Albania
- Tourism in Albania
- Albanian Riviera
- Albania
