= Ecovolis =

Bicycle-sharing system in Tirana, Albania

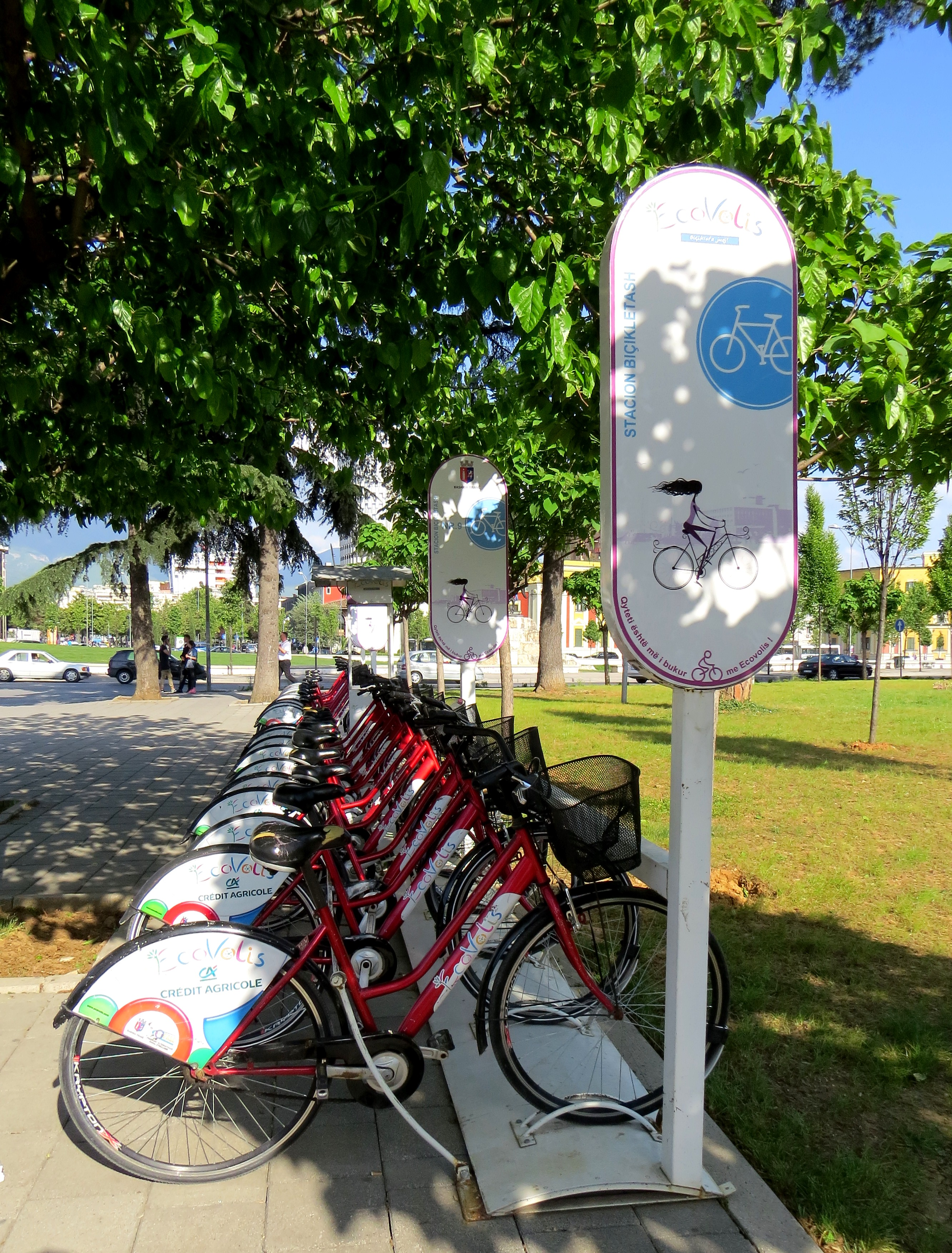

Overview
- Locale: Tirana
- Transit type: Bicycle-sharing system
- Website: ecovolis.al

Operation
- Began operation: March 22, 2011; 15 years ago

Ecovolis (a portmanteau of Eco (from Greek: οἶκος, "house"; -λογία, "study of") and volō: from Latin [English: fly]) was a community based bike sharing program in Tirana, Albania, launched on March 22, 2011, from an environmental NGO called Social Stimulating Alternatives Program (PASS). The system was based on 6 bike stations, respectively staffed by two employees in two shifts. During its time, the Ecovolis program was successful in increasing bicycle use in Tirana.

== History ==
Initially the Tirana Community Bicycle Albania project was supported from PASS organization and the US-based Pedal for Progress organization, which donated 450 bicycles. Sixty of these were used road bikes, which were modified and painted by local technicians to serve as public bikes in the Ecovolis scheme.

In 2014, Ecovolis participated in European Mobility Week.

== System ==
Each Ecovolis station was staffed by two employees in two shifts and contains 30 – 60 bicycles. As of 2014, four stations were in operation in Tirana, and about 2000 people were subscribed. In order to use the bicycles, it was required to provide a personal identification document (such as a passport or an ID card) or to subscribe to the Ecovolis membership card. Bicycles were equipped with a front bicycle basket, a behind carrier, a comfortable saddle and a public fender with the Ecovolis sign. The bicycle stations also provided touristic information to the visitors and a list of the city's main attractions. Being a non-profit social enterprise, the program sometimes offered free bicycle service, cycling courses, donations of bicycles and helmets for children in need, bike tours and a bicycle recycle program.

== Payment ==
The program operated in two ways: through membership subscription or a personal identification document (such as passport or ID card). Individuals registered with the program identify themselves with the Ecovolis membership card at any bicycle station. For visitors, the cost was about $1.00 per day. In 2014, Ecovolis allowed users at some of its kiosks to earn credit towards free bicycles use by returning metal cans for recycling.

== Theft and Vandalism ==
From March 22, 2011, when the Ecovolis initiative begun, 80 bicycles have not been returned or have been stolen since this year, i.e. an average 10 bicycles per month or 2.5 a week. During three different phases, the bicycles have been replaced and added to the stations.
