= Orikum Marina =

Marina in Albania

Orikum Marina is a yacht marina located near the town of Orikum, in Vlorë County, southern Albania. It lies at the southern end of the Bay of Vlorë and is a growing destination for international yachting in the Adriatic Sea.

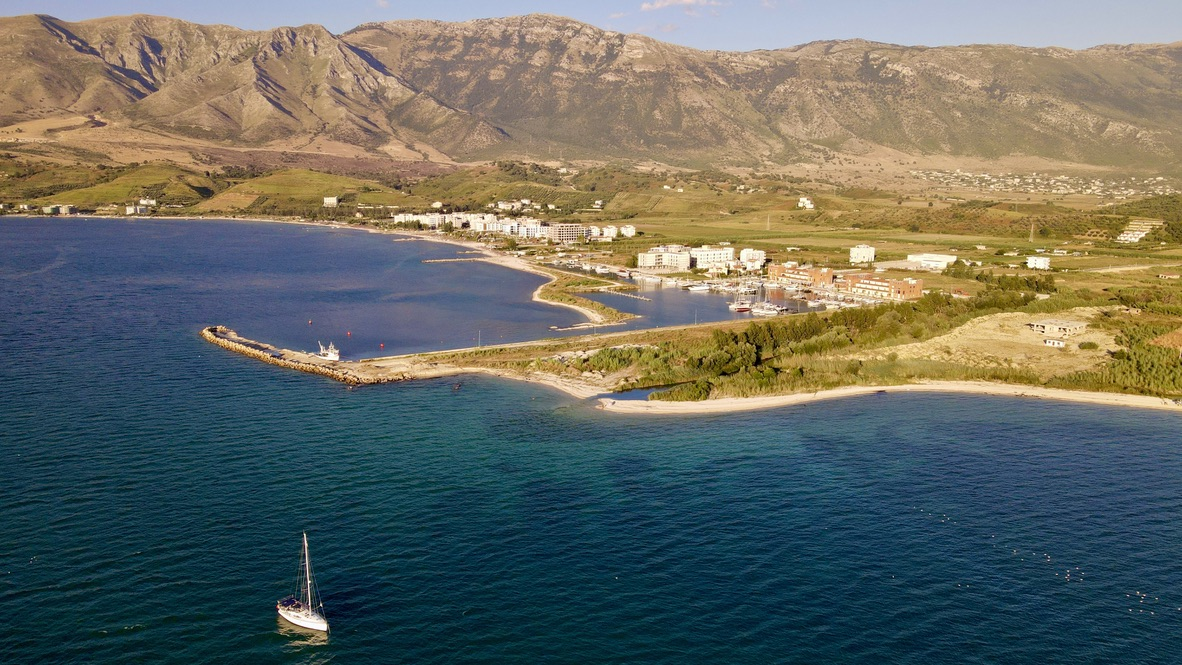
Orikum port

== Overview ==
Orikum Marina was established in the early 2000s and is the first dedicated marina in Albania. Its strategic location makes it an ideal port for yachts traveling between Greece, Montenegro, and Italy. The marina is managed by Italian investors who have brought European-standard infrastructure and services to the facility.

== Facilities ==
The marina provides modern amenities and maritime services for vessels up to 15 meters in length. Key features include:

- berths, with plans to expand to 100
- Fuel station with petrol and diesel
- Electricity and fresh water connections
- Free Wi-Fi
- Sanitary facilities including showers and toilets
- Boat repair and maintenance services
- Laundry services
- Waste disposal and recycling
- Customs and immigration clearance for foreign vessels

== Surroundings ==
The marina is surrounded by natural and cultural attractions:

- Ancient Oricum – An archaeological site with remains of an Illyrian, Greek, and Roman city located nearby.
- Llogara National Park – A mountainous park offering panoramic views, hiking, and diverse wildlife.
- Narta Lagoon – biodiverse wetland home to flamingos and migratory birds.

== Access ==
Orikum Marina is reachable by road via the SH8 highway, about 15 km south of Vlorë. Public transportation options include buses and taxis from Vlorë.

== Future Development ==
There are expansion plans to upgrade the marina’s capacity and facilities, including the addition of a yacht club, restaurants, and luxury accommodations.

== See also ==
- Transport in Albania
- Tourism in Albania
- Albanian Riviera
