= SH 3 (Albania) =

National road in Albania

National Road SH3
- Rruga shtetërore SH3
- SH 3 highlighted in blue

Route information
- Maintained by the Albanian Road Authority
- Length: 156.3 km (97.1 mi)

Major junctions
- North end: Tirana
- South end: Border with Greece (Kapshticë)

Location
- Country: Albania
- Counties: Tirana, Elbasan, Korçë
- Major cities: Tirana, Elbasan, Pogradec, Korçë

Highway system
- Highways in Albania
| ← SH2 | → SH4 |

The SH 3 road (Albanian: Rruga Shtetërore 3) is a national road in southeastern Albania. It runs from the southern outskirts of Tirana to the border with Greece near Kapshticë: the section between Tirana and Elbasan runs parallel with the A3 motorway.

== Route ==
The SH 3 is officially defined as a 156.3-kilometre-long (97.1 mi) radial route that runs southeastward from Tirana East Gate (TEG) to the border with Greece near Kapshticë, passing through Elbasan, Mirakë, Qafë Thanë, Pogradec and Korçë. At the border, the SH 3 connects with the Greek EO2 road, which leads to Florina, Thessaloniki, Alexandroupolis and Turkey.

Between TEG and Elbasan, the SH 3 runs parallel with the A3 motorway: the section between Elbasan and Rrajcë is part of the planned Pan-European Corridor VIII.
