= Rogosin =

Rogosin is a surname. Notable people with the surname include:

- Israel Rogosin (1887–1971), American industrialist
- Joel Rogosin (1932–2020), American television producer and director
- Lionel Rogosin (1924–2000), American filmmaker

== See also ==
- Rogozin
- Rogozhin
- Ragozin
