= SH 8 (Albania) =

National highway in Albania

National Road SH8
- Rruga shtetërore SH8
- Map of the Rruga Shtetërore 8 (SH8) mainline denoted in blue in Albania

Route information
- Maintained by the Autoriteti Rrugor Shqiptar
- Length: 126 km (78 mi)

Major junctions
- North end: Fier, Fier County
- South end: Sarandë, Vlorë County

Location
- Country: Albania
- Counties: Fier; Vlorë
- Major cities: Fier; Sarandë; Vlorë

Highway system
- Highways in Albania

The SH8 highway (Albanian: Rruga Shtetërore 8) is a national highway in Albania spanning 126 kilometres (78.29 miles) across the counties of Fier and Vlorë. It connects the cities of Fier and Vlorë to the city of Sarandë on the Albanian Ionian Sea Coast. The highest point of the SH8 was the Llogara Pass, 1,043 m (3,422 ft) above sea level, until the opening of Llogara Tunnel in July 2024. The road was built in 1920.

== Route ==
The National Road SH8 branches off from the National Road SH4 in Fier and leads southwards the city of Vlorë. From Vlorë, the road underpasses the Llogara Pass, to the Albanian Riviera near Dhërmi and through Himarë to Sarandë, where it ends at the city center.

== Gallery ==
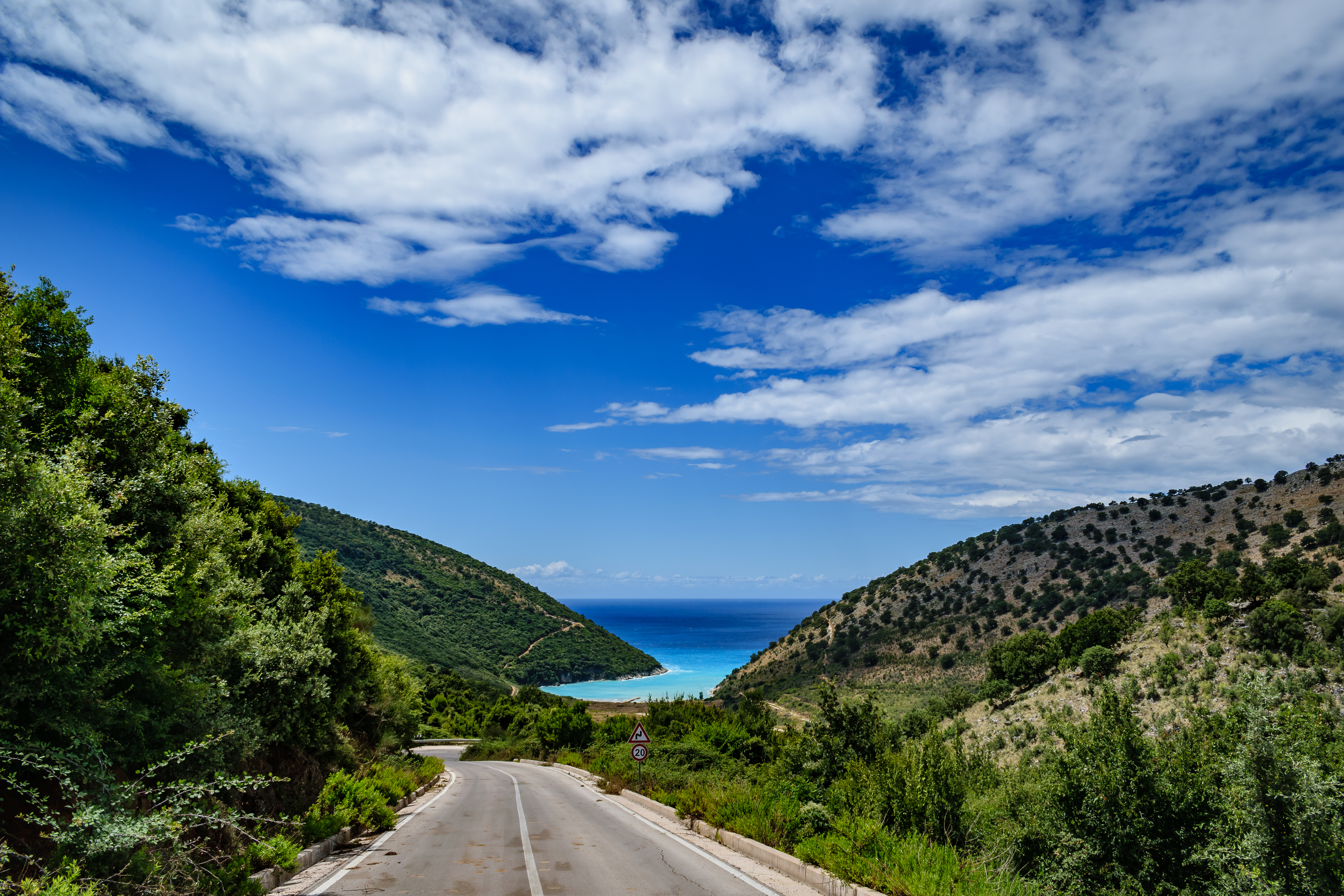
SH8 near Kakomë

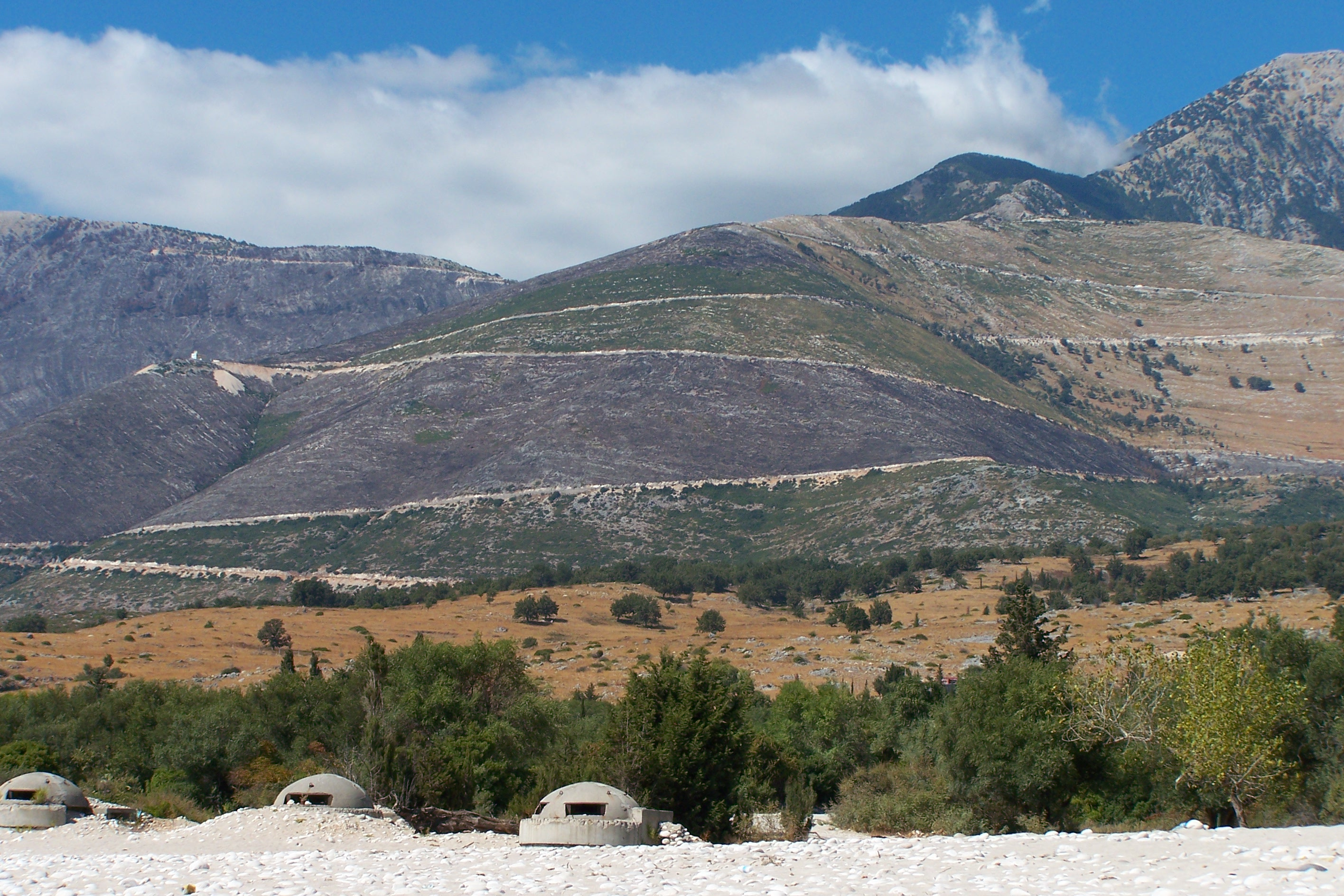
Roads seen from Dhërmi

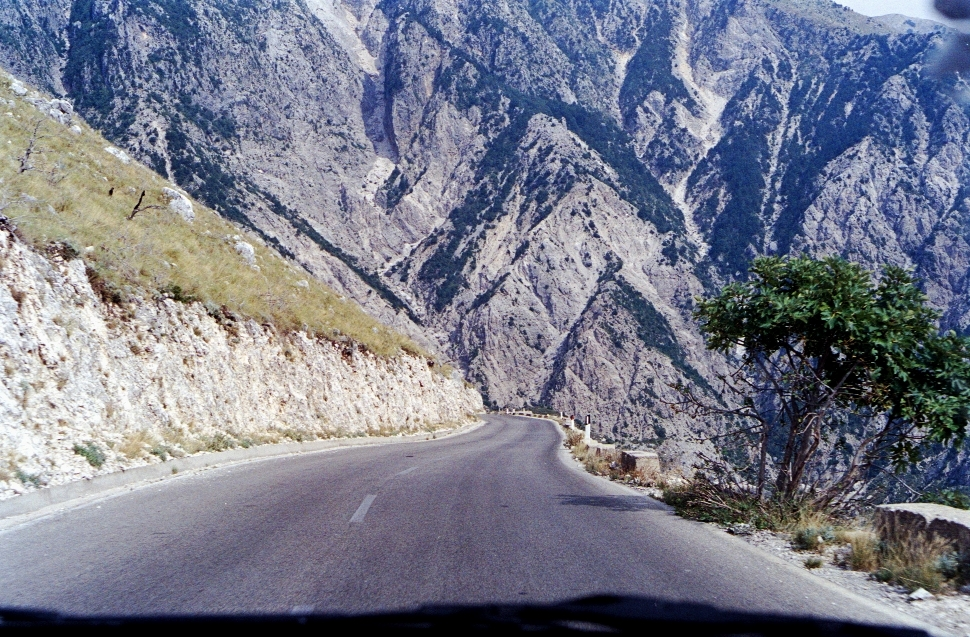
Llogara Pass

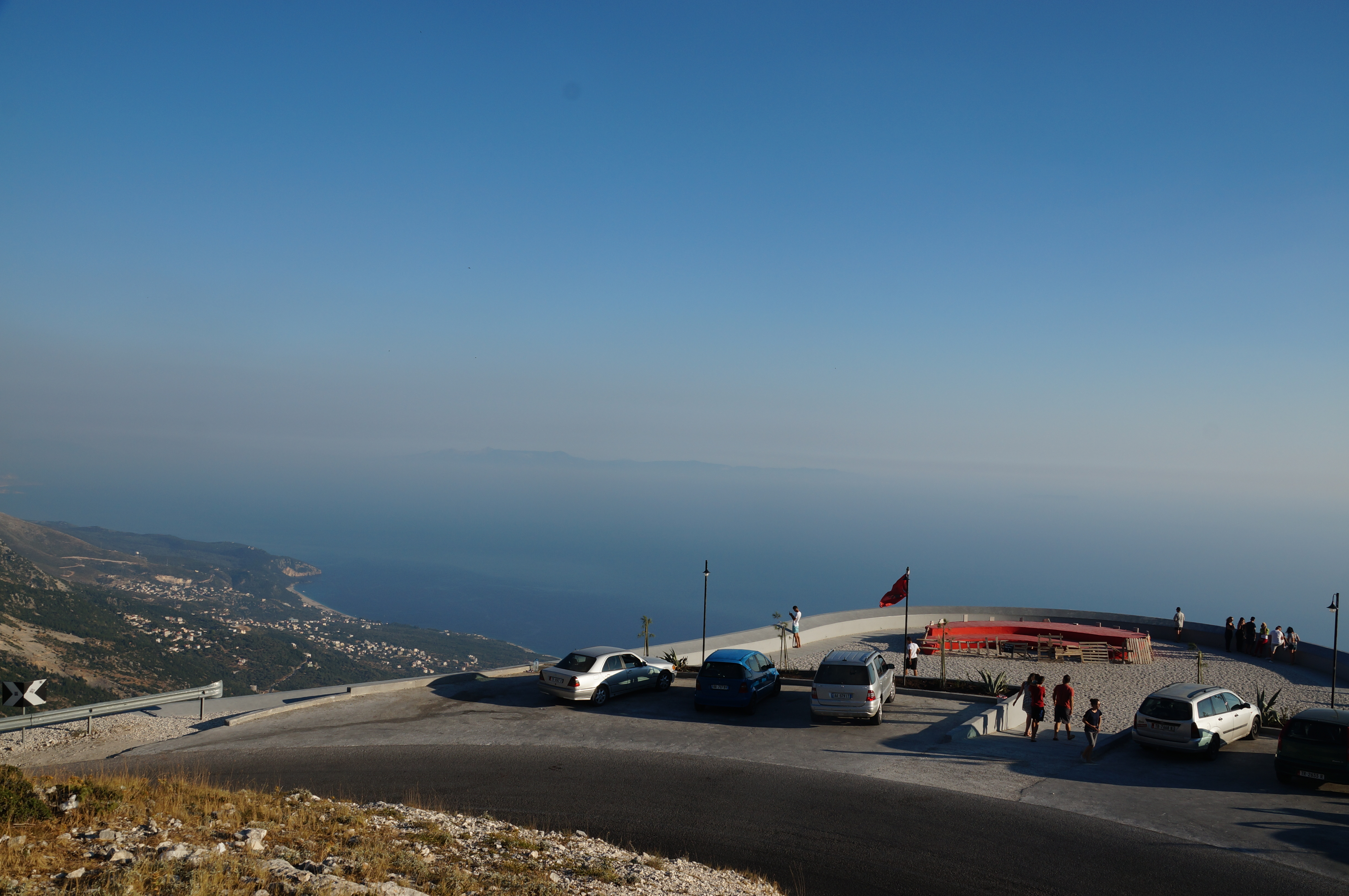
Llogara "Heart" platform from above

== See also ==
- Transport in Albania
- A2 (Albania)
