= A3 (Albania) =

Motorway in Albania

A3 motorway
- Autostradë A3
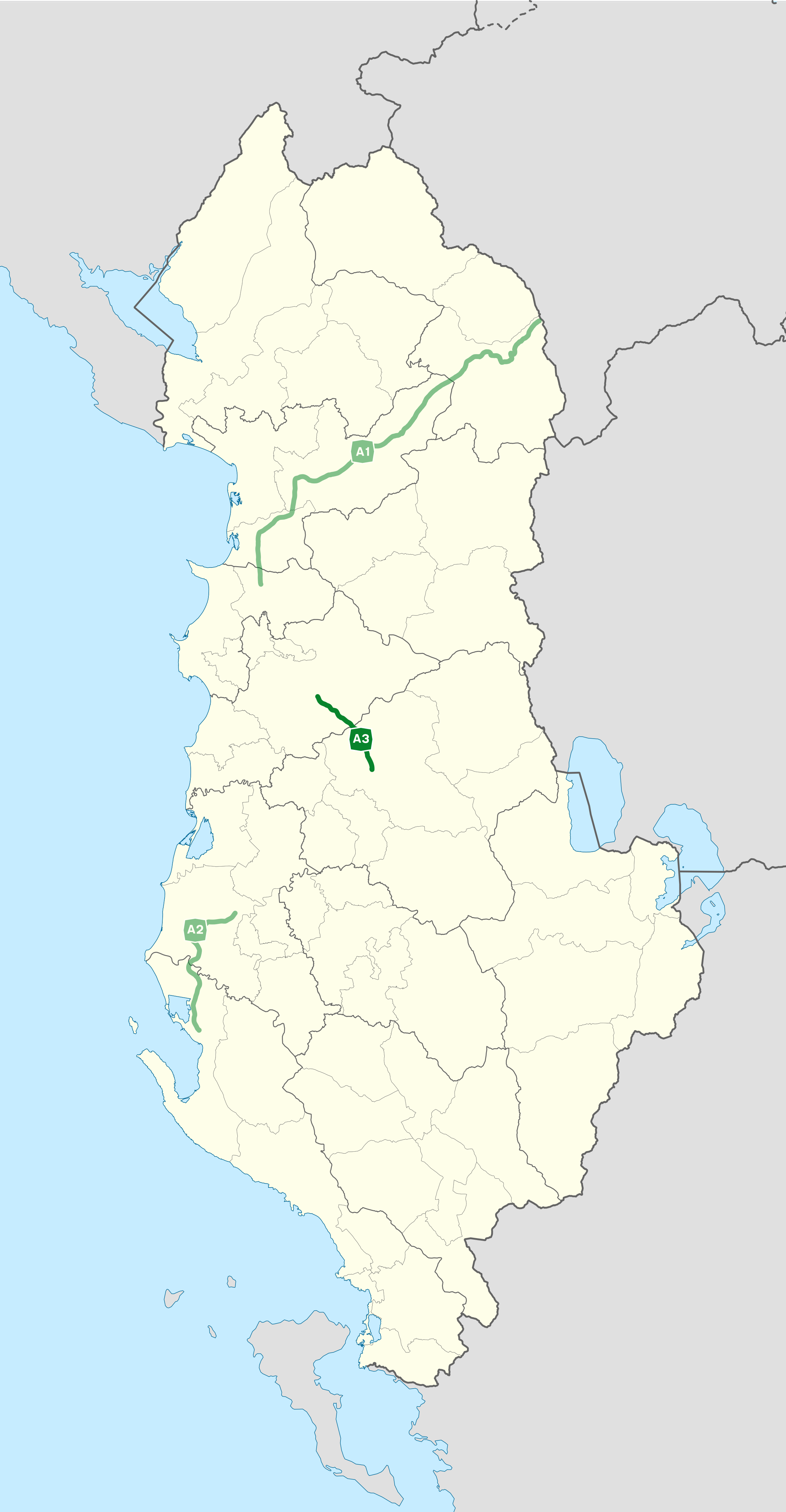
- Map of Autostrada 3 (A3), denoted in dark green

Route information
- Part of E852
- Maintained by the Autoriteti Rrugor Shqiptar
- Length: 31.17 km (19.37 mi)

Major junctions
- Northwest end: in Sauk, Tirana County
- Southeast end: in Bradashesh, Elbasan County

Location
- Country: Albania
- Counties: Elbasan; Tirana
- Major cities: Elbasan; Tirana

Highway system
- Highways in Albania

The A3 motorway (Albanian: Autostrada or Autostradë A3) is a motorway in Albania spanning 31.17 kilometres (19.37 miles) across the counties of Elbasan and Tirana. It consists of two traffic lanes and an emergency lane in each driving direction, except in tunnels where there are emergency bays instead, separated by a central reservation.

After its completion in the summer of 2019, the motorway connects the country's capital city Tirana with the Pan-European Corridor VIII on the SH7, which connects Durrës on the Adriatic Sea to Varna on the Black Sea. As a part of the road network of Albania, the motorway is a part of a major European route, the E852.

== Description ==
=== Tirana–Elbasan section ===
The motorway starts at the TEG Shopping Center interchange connection with Tirana's Outer Ring in Lundër near Sauk south of the Grand Park of Tirana, and follows a route parallel to the National Road 3 (SH3) on the Erzen Valley until the village of Krrabë. Close to the border between the counties of Tirana and Elbasan, the motorway passes along the Krraba tunnel. Passing the tunnel, the highway continues within the Kusha Valley towards Elbasan, where it meets the SH3 again at Bradashesh where the motorway ends.

According to the former Minister of Transportation and Infrastructure, Sokol Olldashi, the construction of the Tirana bypass or outer ring began in March 2011. On 29 April 2011, the construction work on the Krrabë tunnel started and was finalized in March 2013. The end of construction for the entire route from Tirana to Elbasan was projected for June 2013 (18 months construction time), however a hill collapse near Ibe further delayed completion due to inadequate geological feasibility studies. The highway was only completed in the summer of 2019.

The total cost of the motorway amounted to 440 million euros. The funding was partially taken over by the Islamic Development Bank.

The motorway contains 21 viaducts and 2 tunnels, each with a length of 2.3 km (1.4 mi).

=== Berat–Tepelena section ===
In the long run, a further expansion of the highway to Berat and Tepelenë is planned.

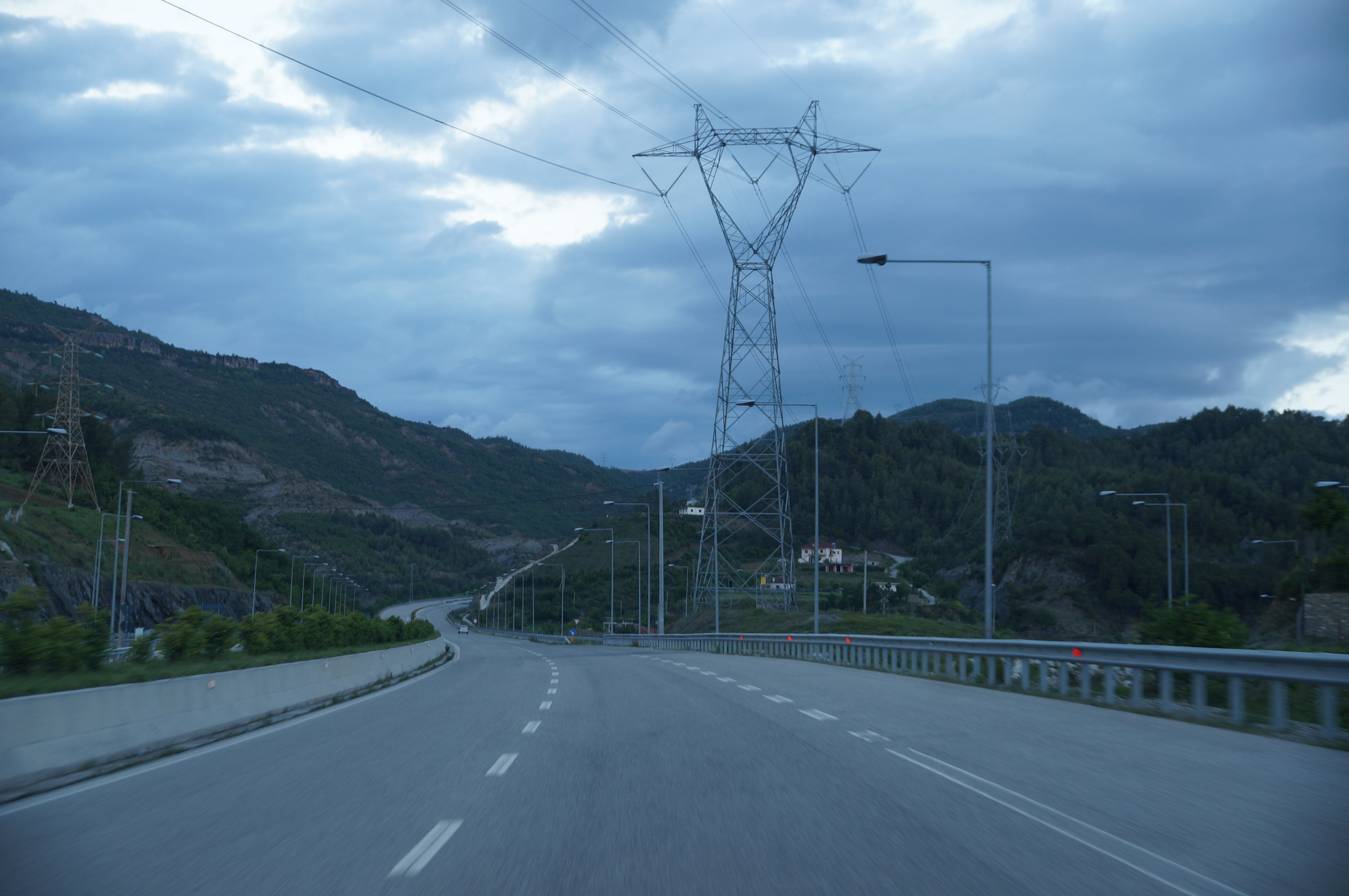
A3 northbound towards Tirana

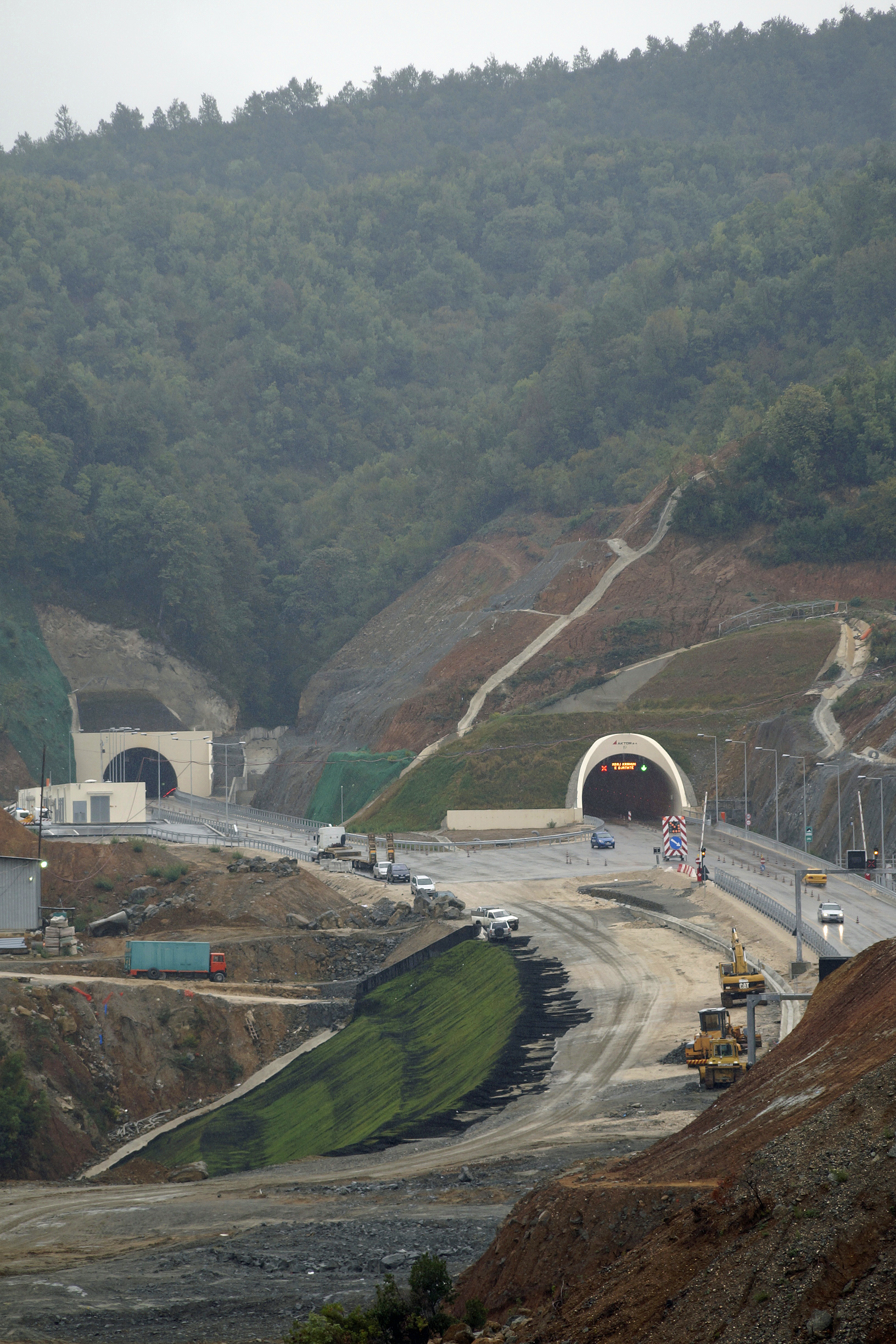
Krraba tunnel during construction.

== See also ==
- International E-road network
- Transport in Albania
- Tirana - Elbasan Highway
