= Rogozov =

Rogozov (Russian: Рогозов) is a Russian male surname. Notable people with the surname include:

- Leonid Rogozov (1934–2000), Soviet general practitioner, notable for his autoappendectomy
- Yury Rogozov (born 1930), Russian rower

== See also ==
- Rogozin
- Rogozovka, a rural locality in Russia
