= Pocestë =

- Village
- Location within Albania
- Coordinates: 40°40′56″N 20°42′56″E
- Country: Albania
- County: Korçë
- Municipality: Maliq
- Administrative unit: Libonik
- Time zone: UTC+1 (CET)
  - Summer (DST): UTC+2 (CEST)

Pocestë is a community in the Korçë County, Albania. At the 2015 local government reform it became part of the municipality Maliq.
