= A2 (Albania) =

Motorway in Albania

A2 motorway
- Autostradë A2
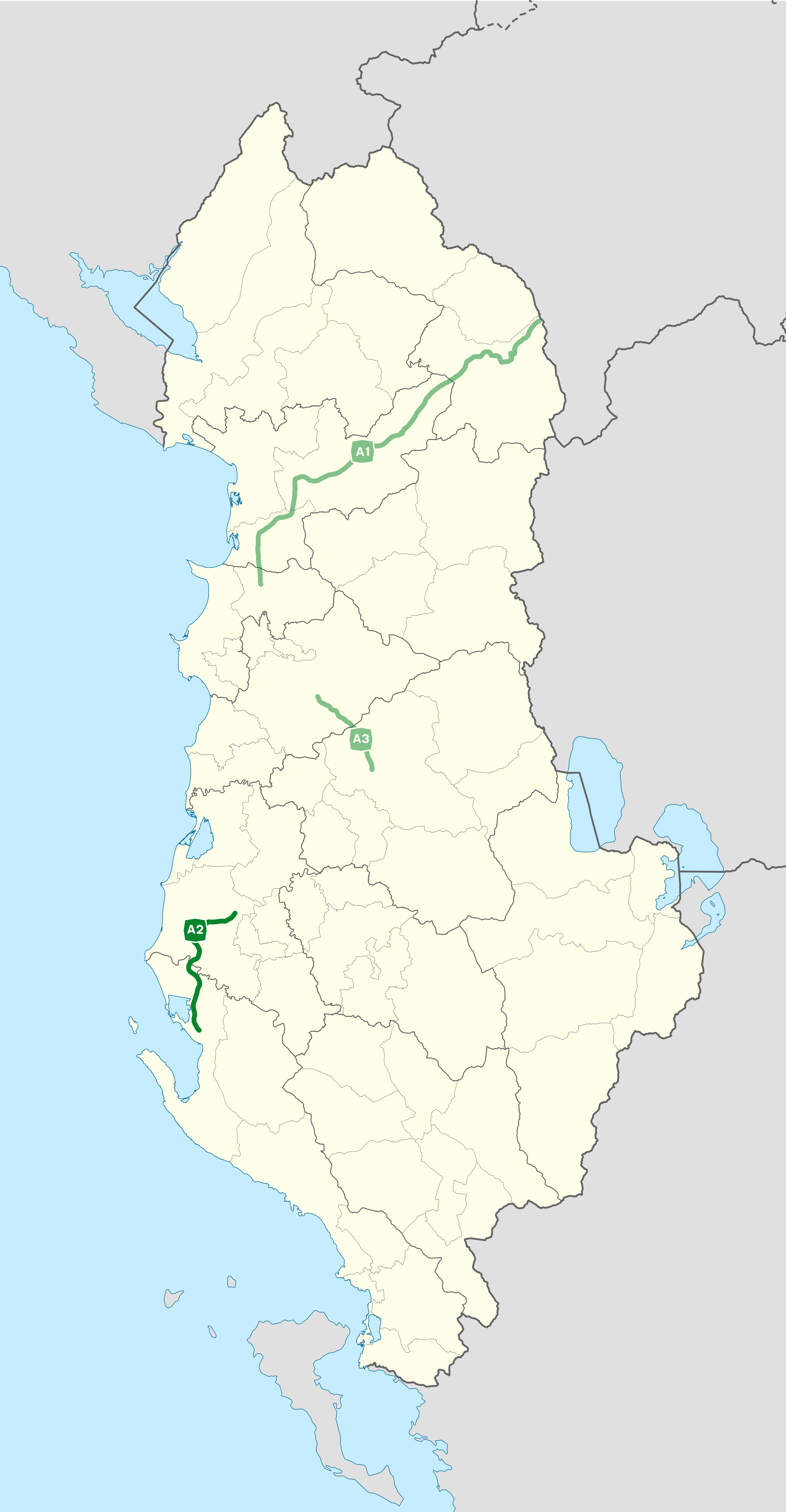
- Map of Autostrada 2 (A2), denoted in dark green

Route information
- Maintained by the Autoriteti Rrugor Shqiptar
- Length: 46.5 km (28.9 mi)

Major junctions
- North end: Bypass of Fier
- South end: Bypass of Vlorë

Location
- Country: Albania
- Counties: Fier; Vlorë
- Major cities: Fier; Vlorë

Highway system
- Highways in Albania

The A2 motorway (Albanian: Autostrada or Autostradë 2) is a motorway in Albania spanning 46.5 kilometres (28.89 miles) across the counties of Fier and Vlorë.

As it connects Fier, the sixth largest city, to maritime Vlorë, the third largest city in the country and largest city in southern Albania, the motorway represents a major north–south transportation corridor and a significant part of the Adriatic–Ionian motorway. The A2 is also the starting point of the Pan-European Corridor VIII. The motorway consists of two traffic lanes and an emergency lane in each driving direction separated by a central reservation. National significance of the motorway is reflected through its positive economic impact on the cities and towns it connects as well as its importance to tourism in Albania.

The A2 motorway has dramatically alleviated congestion on the adjacent National Road 8 (SH8) in the summer season by allowing faster travel time to Adriatic seaside resorts along the Vlora seaside, and further south to the Albanian Riviera. At Levan near Fier the motorway links with the newly built SH4 single carriageway to Greece through Tepelenë and Gjirokastër. The total construction cost for the motorway amounted to 60 million euros as the project underwent changes to accommodate for the rising levels of Vjosa River.

== Overview ==
The preceding National Road 4 (SH4) at the northern edge stretching between Durrës, Kavajë, Lushnjë, and Fier has undergone widening to dual carriageway standards, and will be linked with A2 through the Fier Bypass. On 3 February 2015, the Government of Albania received funding for the Vlorë Bypass linking A2 with coastal National Road 8 (SH8) along the Albanian Riviera.

It was expected to start around 2015 and be completed in 2016 or early 2017, stretching from the southern end of A2 to Orikum. However, the winning firm Serenissima declared bankruptcy and the Albanian government was obliged to scrap the contract and reopen the bid for both the Fier and Vlora Bypasses. Construction work on the Fier Bypass is set to resume in the fall of 2018. The Fier Bypass was opened on 15 June 2020, and Vlore Bypass on 16 July 2021.

== Gallery ==
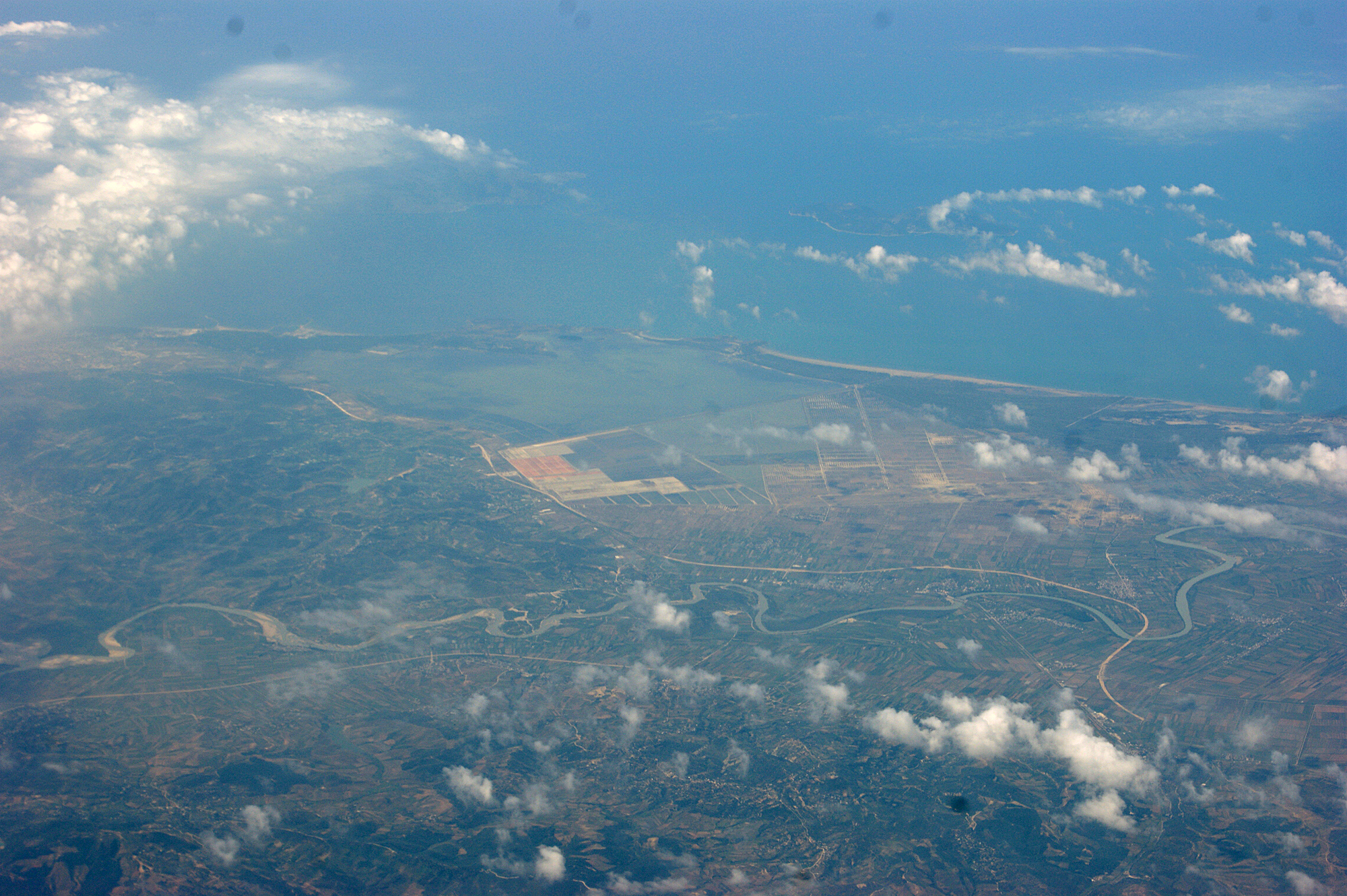
A2 seen from the air near Vjose-Narta Lagoon Protected Area

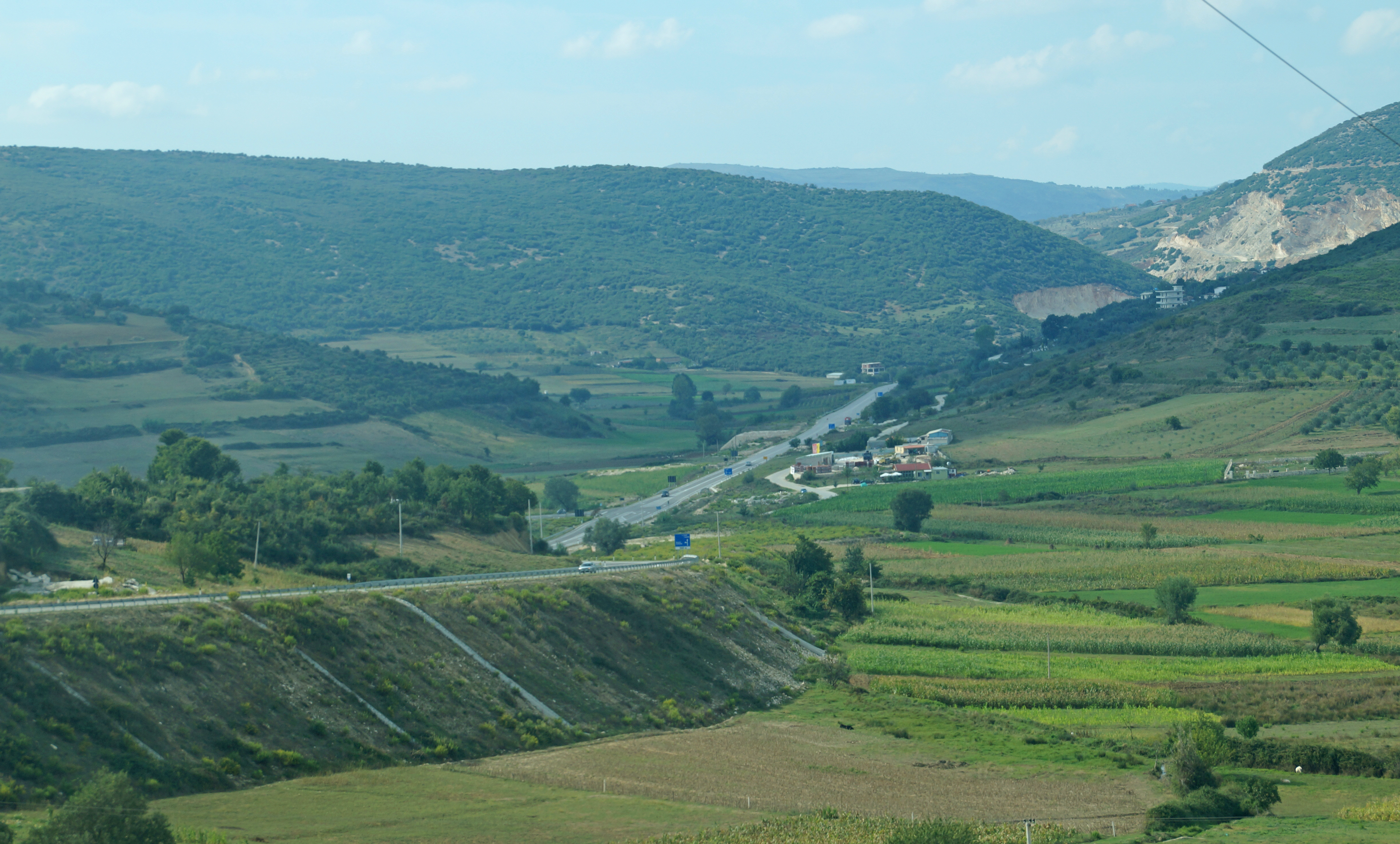
SH4 towards Tepelene which links with A2 at Levan

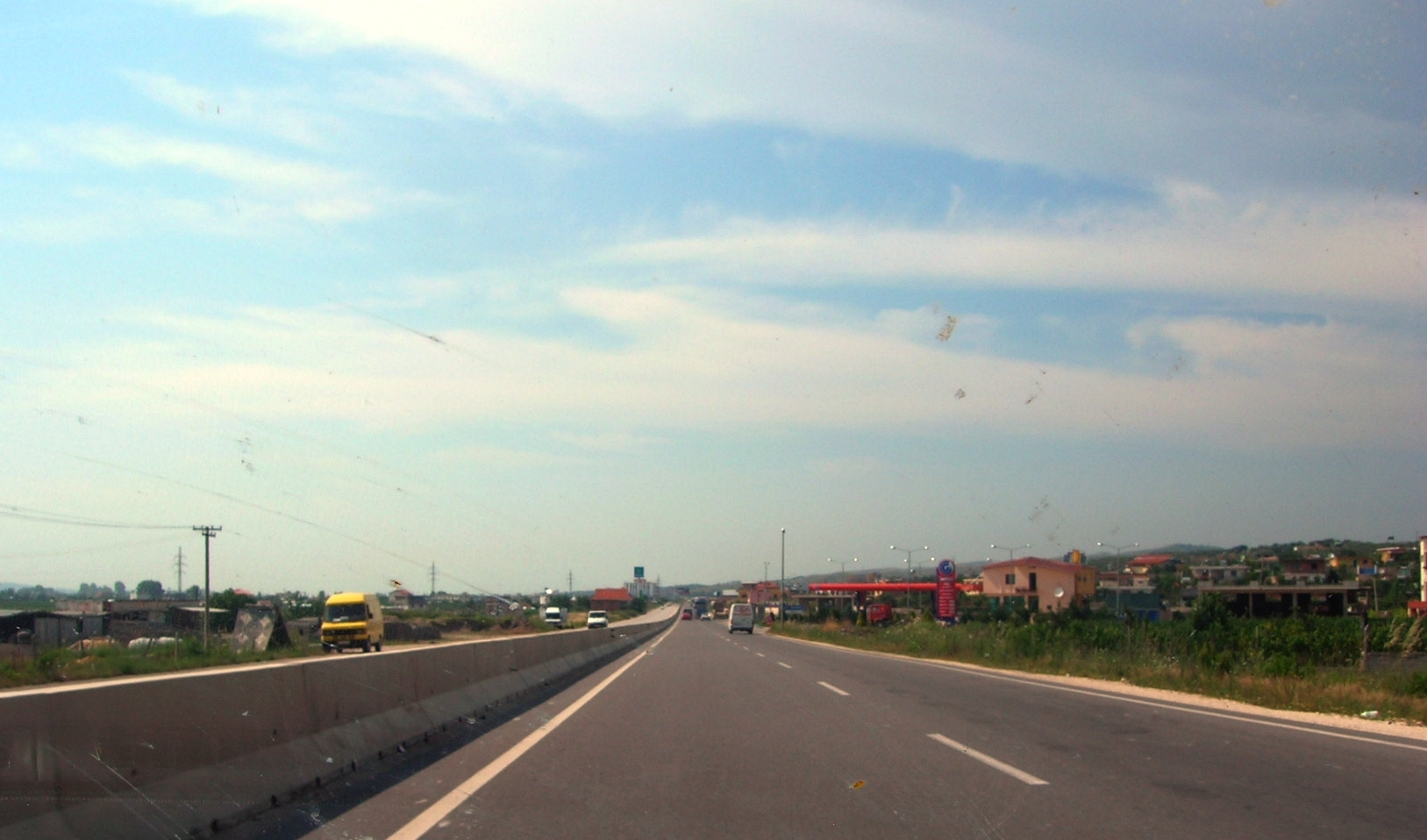
SH4 Highway towards Fier linking with A2 through the Fier Bypass

== See also ==
- Transport in Albania
- SH 4 (Albania)
- Adriatic Ionian motorway
