= Highways in Albania =

Transport network in Albania

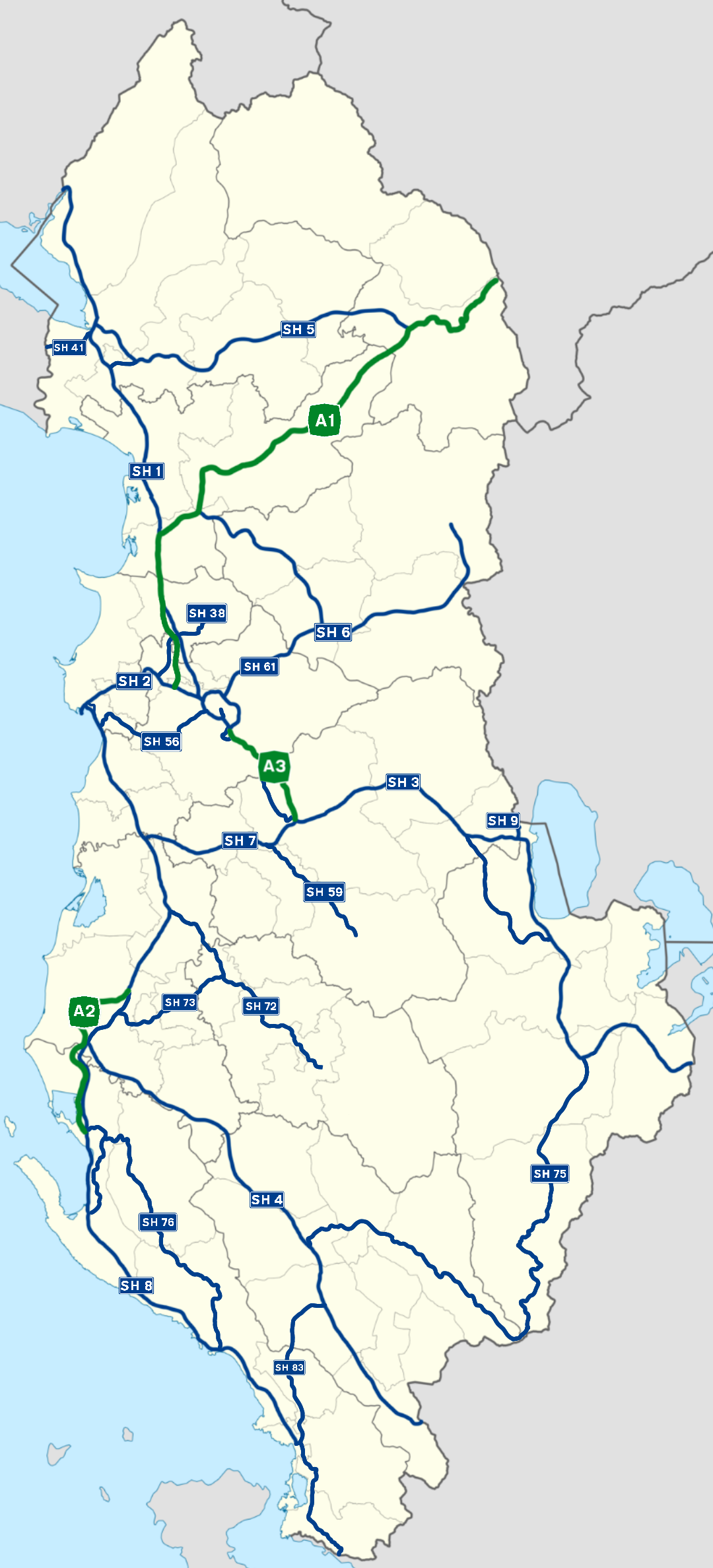
A map of Albania illustrating the current expressways and motorways in Albania.

The Highways in Albania are the central state and main transport network in Albania. The motorways and expressways are both part of the national road network. The motorways are primary roads with a speed limit of 110 kilometres per hour (68 mph), apart from A1, which from extension of the highway, has now reach 130 kilometers per hour (80.7 mph). They have white on green road signs such as in Italy and other countries nearby. The expressways are the secondary roads, also dual carriageways, but without an emergency lane. They have a speed limit of 90 kilometres per hour (56 mph). They have white-on-blue road signs.

The A1 is the country's longest and only toll highway connecting the port city of Durrës on the Adriatic Sea in the west as well as the capital of Tirana in the center, with the Republic of Kosovo in the northeast. The A3 is the second longest motorway and connects Tirana with the Pan-European Corridor VIII, running from Durrës on the Adriatic Sea to Varna on the Black Sea. The A2 is the third longest motorway and represents a significant north-south corridor within the country and the Adriatic-Ionian motorway.

The country is a member of the Pan-European Corridor system. The Pan-European Corridor VIII passes through the country and starts at Durrës on the Adriatic Sea in the west continuing across North Macedonia and Bulgaria and ends at Varna at the Black Sea in the east.

The country signed the European Agreement on Main International Traffic Arteries in 2006. The following European routes are currently defined to end at, or near, the border of Albania such as the E86, E762, E851, E852, E853.

== History ==
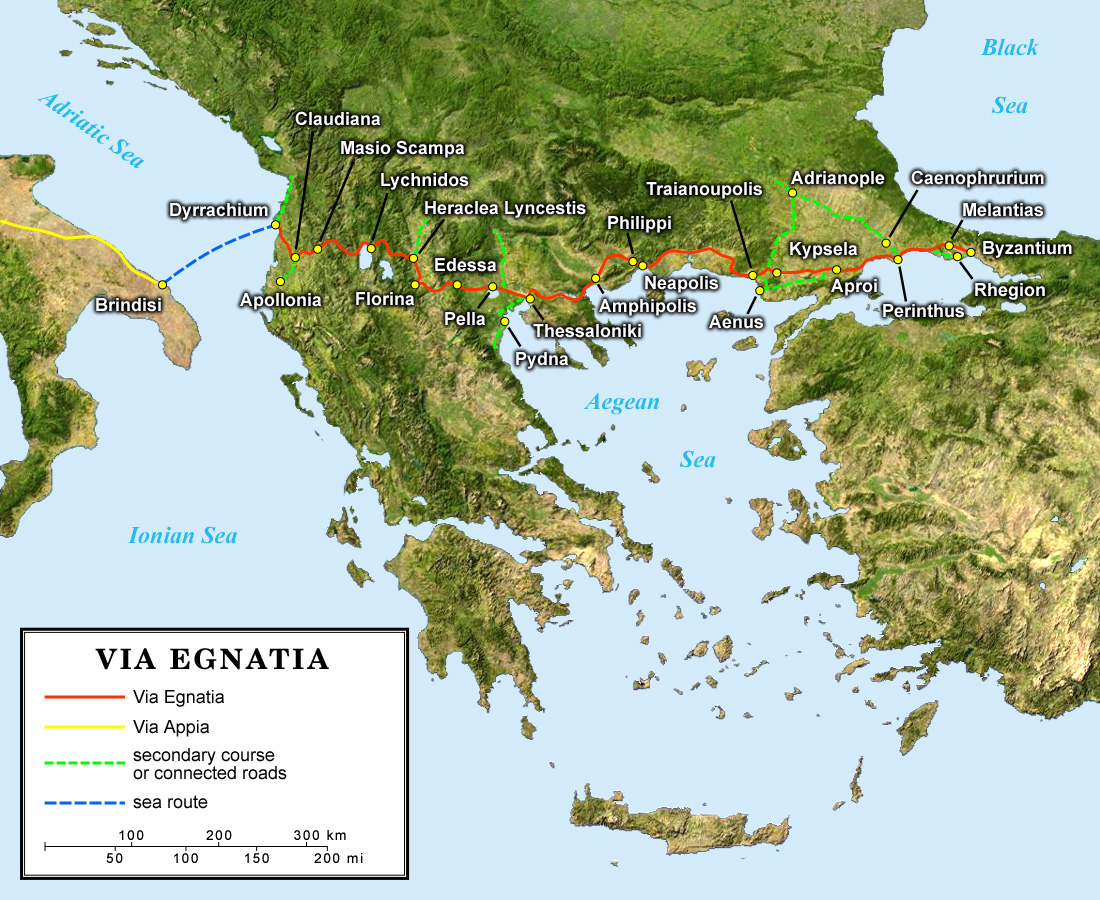
The ancient route of the Via Egnatia, which connected ancient Durrës in the west with Constantinople in the east.

Since antiquity, the area of Albania served as an important crossroad within the Roman Empire through the Via Pubblica and Via Egnatia. The former passed through northern Albania, while the latter linked Rome with Byzantium, through Durrës on the Adriatic Sea. During World War I, occupying forces opened up new road sections mainly in the mountainous areas of the country. In King Zog's period, further road construction took place near Vlorë and at Krraba Pass between Tirana and Elbasan.

The total length of Albania's roads more than doubled in the first three decades after World War II, and by the 1980s almost all of the country's remote mountain areas were connected, either by dirt or paved roads, with the capital city of Tirana, and ports on the Adriatic and Ionian Sea. Private car ownership was not allowed and the only vehicles circulating were state-owned trucks, agricultural and official vehicles, buses, motorcycles, and bicycles. The country's roads, however, were generally narrow, poorly marked, pocked with holes, and in the early 1990s often crowded with pedestrians and people riding mules, bicycles, and horse-drawn carts.

The largest road project in the history of Albania was the construction of the A1 dual carriageway from 2007 to 2010, linking Albania with Kosovo. The segment involved the carving of a mountainous terrain, and the construction of a 5.6 km long tunnel and dozens of bridges. In 2010, Prime Minister Sali Berisha announced plans to build several major highways.

At present, major cities are linked with either single or dual carriageways or well-maintained roads. There is a dual carriageway connecting the port city of Durrës with Tirana, Vlorë, and partially Kukës. There are three formal motorway segments in Albania: Kashar-Thumanë-Milot-Rrëshen-Kalimash (A1), Levan-Vlorë (A2), and Tirana-Elbasan (A3). Most rural segments continue to remain in bad conditions as their reconstruction only began in the late 2000s by the Albanian Development Fund.

== Classification ==
All roads in the country are property of Albanian Road Authority (Autoriteti Rrugor Shqiptar (ARRSH)), a directorate subordinated to the Ministry of Transportation and Infrastructure based in Tirana. Currently, cars are free of payment while driving on both motorways and expressways except on A1 motorway which has become a toll highway since March 2018. A2 and A3 are planned to become toll highways shortly. A new road system has been introduced in the early 2000s and is classified as follows:

Type	Name (Albanian)	Name (English)	Description
	Autostradë	Motorway	The motorways are the highest level of roadway in the country, marked as A with a number on a green field.
	Rrugë Shtetërore	State Road	The state roads are the main and most common level of roadway in the country, connecting major cities marked as SH with a number on a blue field.
	Rrugë Rrethi	District Road	The district roads are the lower level of roadway in the country found between districts roadway marked as Rr with a number on a blue field.
	Rrugë Komunale	Municipal Road	The municipal roads are the lowest level of roadway in the country, typically found in rural areas and marked as K with a number on a white field though it is not observed on the ground.

== Motorways ==
The motorways in Albania are defined by the Ministry of Transportation and Infrastructure. The country's motorway network has been extensively modernized throughout the end of the communist regime and part of it is still under construction. In the Albanian language, they are called Autostrada or Autostradë, and they are defined as roads with at least two lanes in each direction and with emergency lanes. The markings have green backgrounds and are identified as consisting of letter A and the motorway number assigned by the legislation. The national speed limit on an autostradë, effective in case no other speed limits are present, is 110 kilometres per hour (68 mph).

Motorway	County	Length	Cities	Description
A1 (Albania)	Durrës, Tirana, Lezhë, Kukës	114 km (71 mi)	Durrës, Laç, Lezhë, Rrëshen, Kukës	The A1 (Albanian: Autostrada A1) is mostly a four traffic lane motorway, spanning 114 km (71 mi). The motorway connects the Albanian Adriatic Sea Coast at Durrës in the southwest to the Albanian Alps at Morinë in the northeast. It is currently part of the European route E851 and will form part of the Adriatic–Ionian motorway and Pan-European Corridor X.
A2	Fier, Vlorë	46.5 km (28.9 mi)	Fier, Vlorë	The A2 (Albanian: Autostrada A2) is a four traffic lane motorway, spanning 46.5 km (28.9 mi). The motorway connects Fier in the north and Vlorë in the south. It will form part of the Adriatic–Ionian motorway.
A3	Tirana, Elbasan	31.1 km (19.3 mi)	Tirana, Elbasan	The A3 (Albanian: Autostrada A3) is a four traffic lane motorway, spanning 31.1 km (19.3 mi). The motorway connects Tirana in the northwest and Elbasan in the southeast. It will form part of the Pan-European Corridor VIII.

== National Roads & Expressways ==
The expressways in Albania are defined by the Ministry of Infrastructure and Energy.

Expressway	County	Length	Cities	Description
SH 1 (Albania)	Durrës, Lezhë, Shkodër, Tirana	125 km (78 mi)	Fushë-Krujë, Koplik, Laç, Lezhë, Shkodër, Tirana	The SH 1 (Albanian: Rruga Shtetërore SH 1) is an expressway, spanning 125 km (78 mi). The expressway connects Montenegro across the counties of Shkodër, Lezhë, Durrës and Tirana to the capital of Tirana. It is currently part of the European routes E762 and E851 and will form part of the Adriatic–Ionian motorway.
SH 2 (Albania)	Durrës, Tirana	33 km (21 mi)	Durrës, Tirana	The SH 2 (Albanian: Rruga Shtetërore SH 2) is an expressway, spanning 33 km (21 mi). The expressway connects the capital Tirana across the counties of Durrës and Tirana to the second largest city of Durrës. It is currently part of the European route E762.
Highways in Albania	Elbasan, Korçë, Tirana	151 km (94 mi)	Elbasan, Korçë, Librazhd, Pogradec, Tirana	The SH 3 (Albanian: Rruga Shtetërore SH 3) is an expressway, spanning 151 km (94 mi). The expressway connects Greece across the counties of Elbasan, Korçë, and Tirana to the capital Tirana. It is currently part of the European routes E86 and E852.
SH 4 (Albania)	Durrës, Fier, Gjirokastër, Tirana	215 km (134 mi)	Durrës, Fier, Gjirokastër, Lushnjë, Rogozhina, Tepelenë	The SH 4 (Albanian: Rruga Shtetërore SH 4) is an expressway, spanning 215 km (134 mi). The expressway connects Durrës across the counties of Elbasan, Korçë, and Tirana to Greece. It is currently part of the European route E853 and will form part of the Adriatic–Ionian motorway.
Highways in Albania	Elbasan, Tirana	40.5 km (25.2 mi)	Elbasan, Peqin, Rogozhina	The SH 7 (Albanian: Rruga Shtetërore SH 7) is an expressway, spanning 40.5 km (25.2 mi). The expressway connects Rogozhina across the counties of Elbasan and Tirana to Elbasan. It is currently part of the Pan-European Corridor VIII.
SH 8 (Albania)	Fier, Vlorë	148 km (92 mi)	Fier, Himara, Sarandë, Vlorë	The SH 8 (Albanian: Rruga Shtetërore SH 8) is an expressway, spanning 148 km (92 mi). The expressway connects Fier across the counties of Fier, Vlorë to Sarandë.
Highways in Albania	Elbasan	3.2 km (2.0 mi)	–	The SH 9 (Albanian: Rruga Shtetërore SH 9) is an expressway, spanning 3.2 km (2.0 mi). The expressway connects Qafë Thanë across the county of Elbasan to the Republic of Macedonia. It is currently part of the European route E852.

== Construction work ==
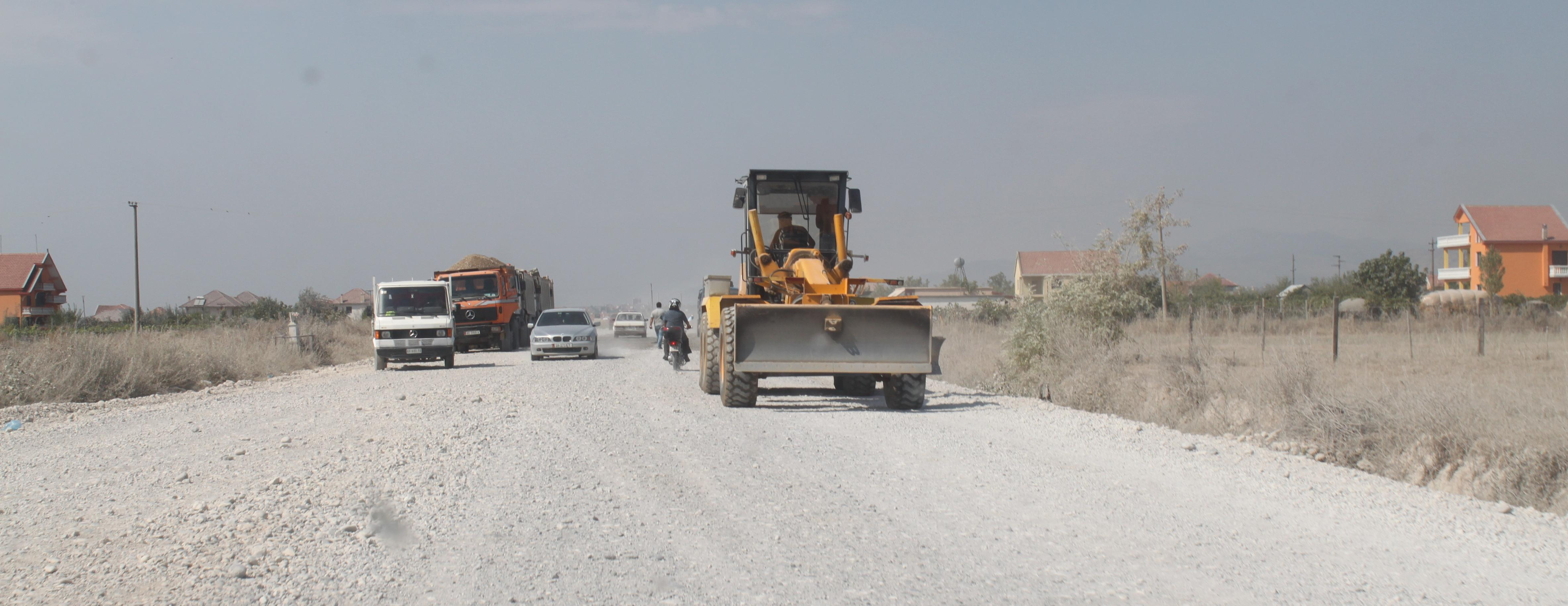
Typical construction work along SH1 near the border with Montenegro

Following the end of communism in 1991, the highways in the country began to be modernized with the construction of the National Road 2, connecting the country's capital of Tirana with the country's second-largest city of Durrës. Since 2000, main roadways have drastically improved, though lacking standards in design and road safety. This involved the construction of new roadways, planting of trees and related greening projects, and lately the installing of contemporary signs. However, some state roads continue to deteriorate from lack of maintenance while others remain unfinished.

The priority of the first Rama government in 2014 was the completion of unfinished roadways, due to lack of funding. Another major priority was the completion of the Arbër Highway (Rruga e Arbërit), connecting Tirana with the city of Debar in the Republic of North Macedonia through the current National Road 6. Eventually, this Superstradë will become part of the Pan-European Corridor VIII, linking Albania with the Republic of North Macedonia and Greece. Another important objectives include, the completion of the problematic Tirana-Elbasan Highway part of the A3, the launching of toll highways starting with A1, and the construction of the Southern Axis of Albania Boshti i Jugut, passing across central and southern Albania. The completion of the Eastern Ring of Albania Unaza Lindore passing through Valbonë, Kukës, Krumë, Bulqizë and Librazhd has also been a priority. When all corridors are completed, Albania will have an estimated 759 kilometers of highway linking it with its neighbors.

=== Winter maintenance ===
Winter 2021-22 marked the first time that main roadways in the Albanian Alps have been open for traffic after a snowfall. Therefore, the many guesthouses of the area now are accessible in the winter as well. This came as a result of using advanced snow-clearing equipment by local authorities and contractors. In recent years, winter maintenance has greatly improved in all major roadways of the country including the A1 toll motorway.

=== Controversies ===
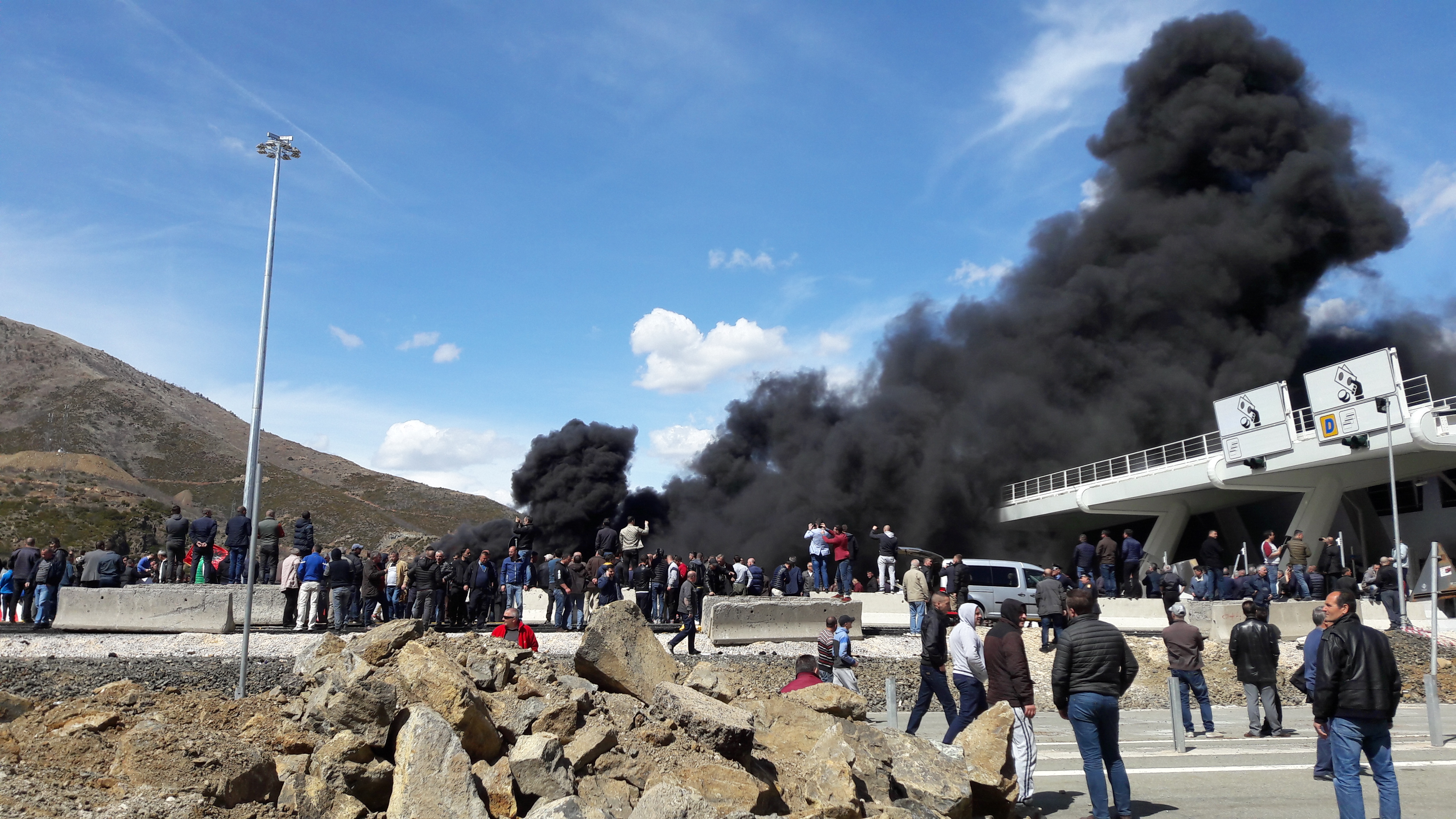
Violent protests at the A1 motorway toll plaza in 2018

Despite considerable investments, some dual carriageways are partially up to either motorway or state road standards as they are badly configured, contain unfinished overpasses, uncontrolled access points, lack of fencing, and either misplaced or missing road signs, inadequate entry and exit ramps, and are indiscriminately used by animals, mopeds, agricultural vehicles, and pedestrians. These are mostly due to alleged corruption and lack of or low-quality projects and feasibility studies. It is believed that the above structural problems can be eliminated by transforming some highways to toll highway, like the A1 toll motorway in Northern Albania which has brought it to acceptable motorway standards. Works on most highways are mostly completed, though they remained unfinished between 2011 and 2013 due to lack of funds.

In March 2018, violent clashes took place at the A1 motorway toll plaza in Kalimash, Northern Albania as locals demanded lower fees on an unfinished project, and lacked the availability of a secondary road.

Below is a list of main roadways undergoing construction work in the last decade. The Rama 2 Government plans to standardize road projects and continue those left unfinished from previous years:

=== As of Summer 2024 ===
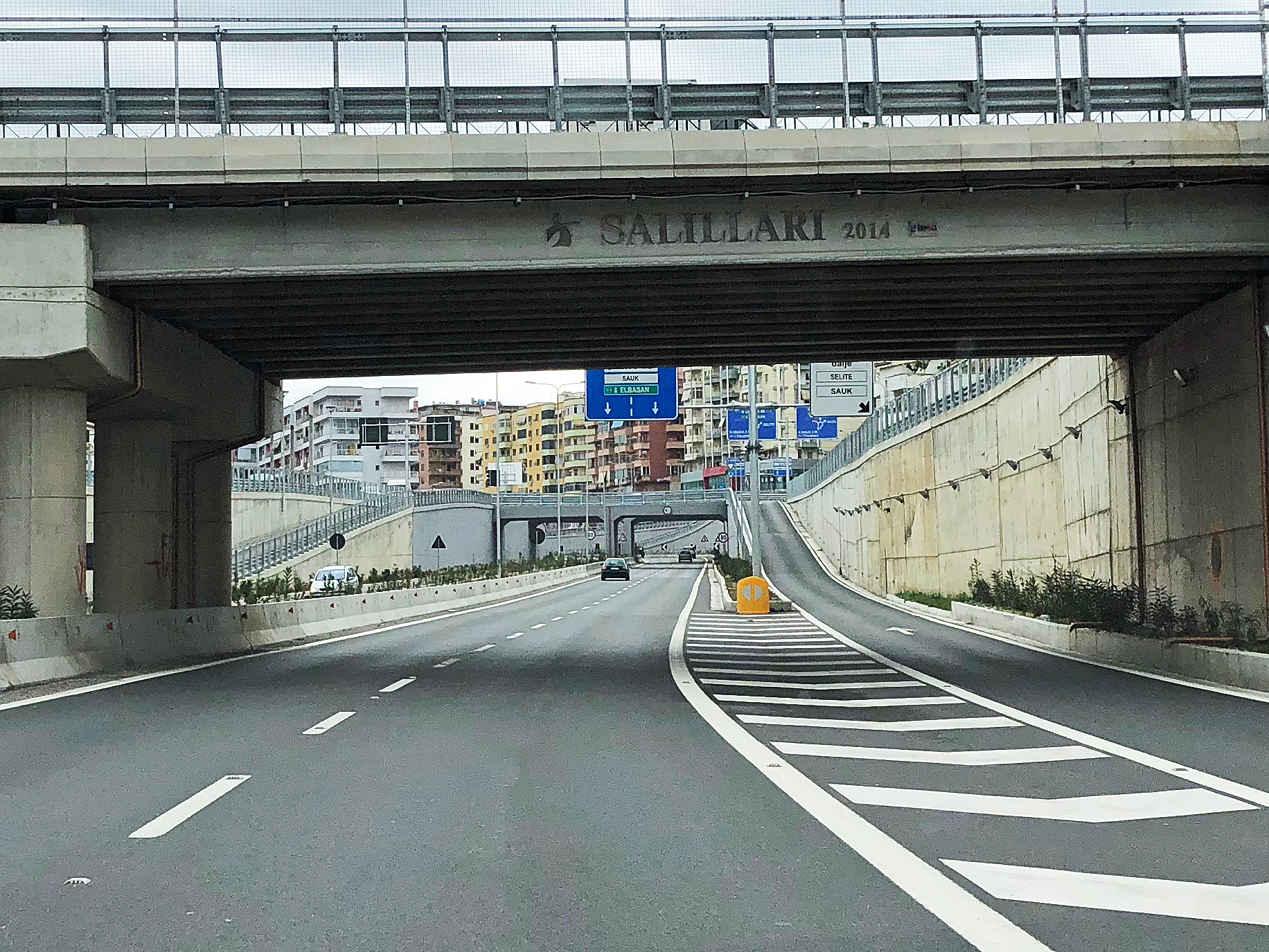
Tirana's Southern Outer Ring, 2018

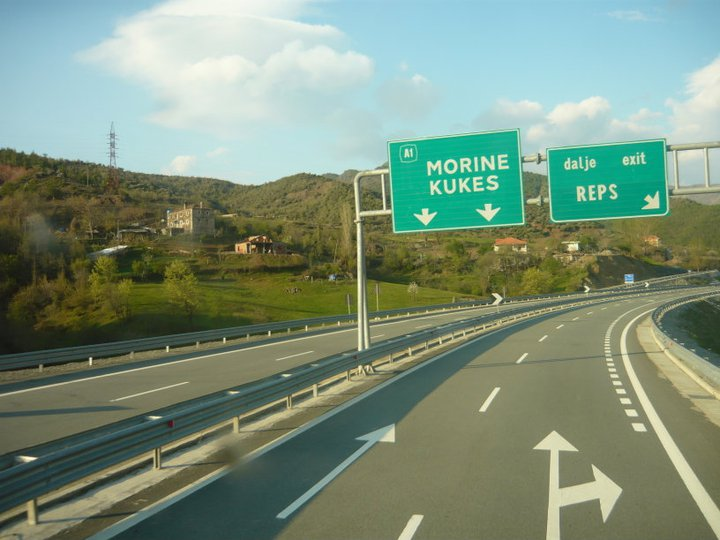
A1 Nation's Highway linking Albania with Kosovo

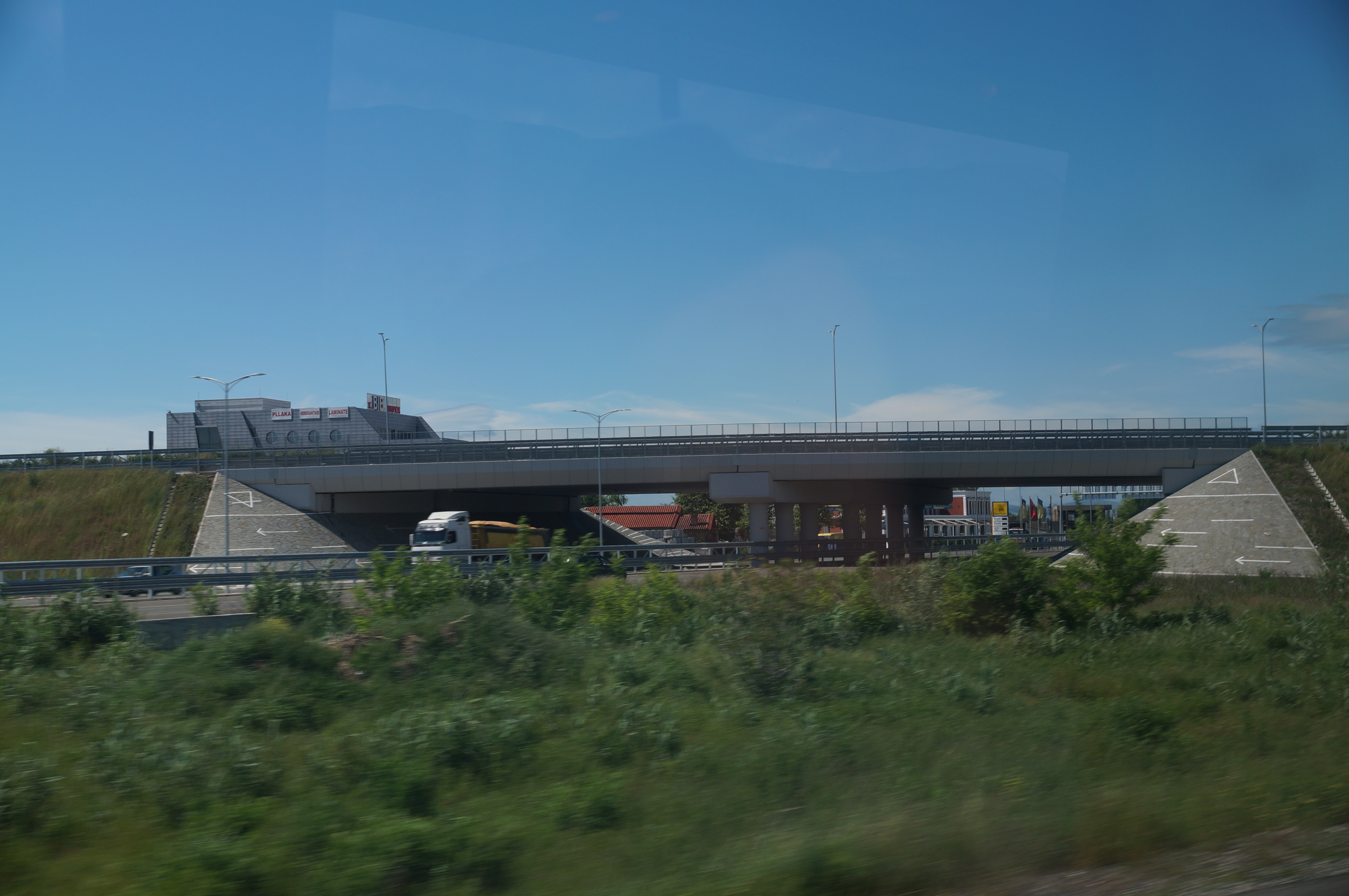
Milot trumpet interchange is an important artery linking A1 with SH1 between Tirana, Shkodër, and Pristina

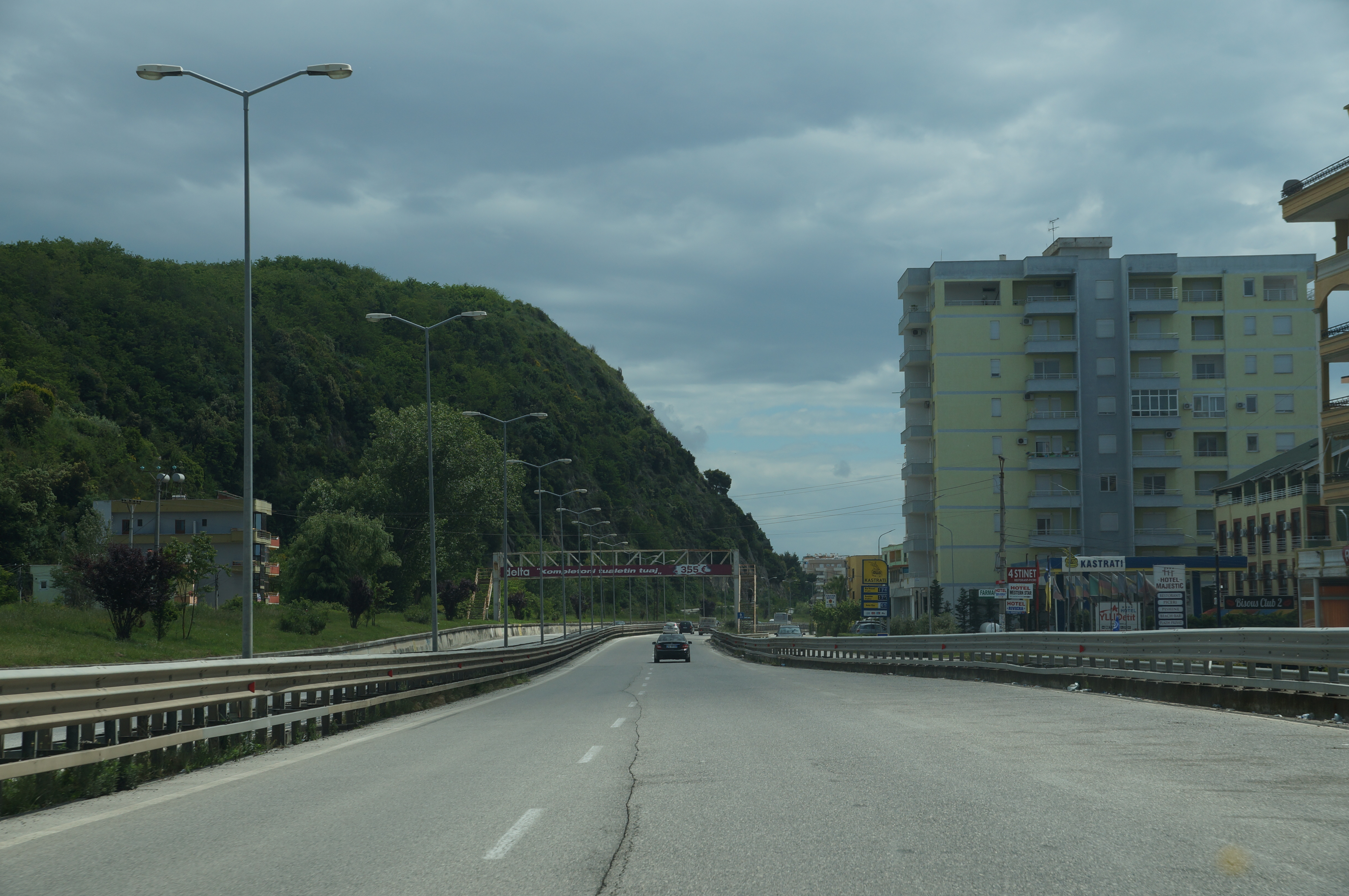
SH4 near Golem beach resort area south of Durrës in central Albania

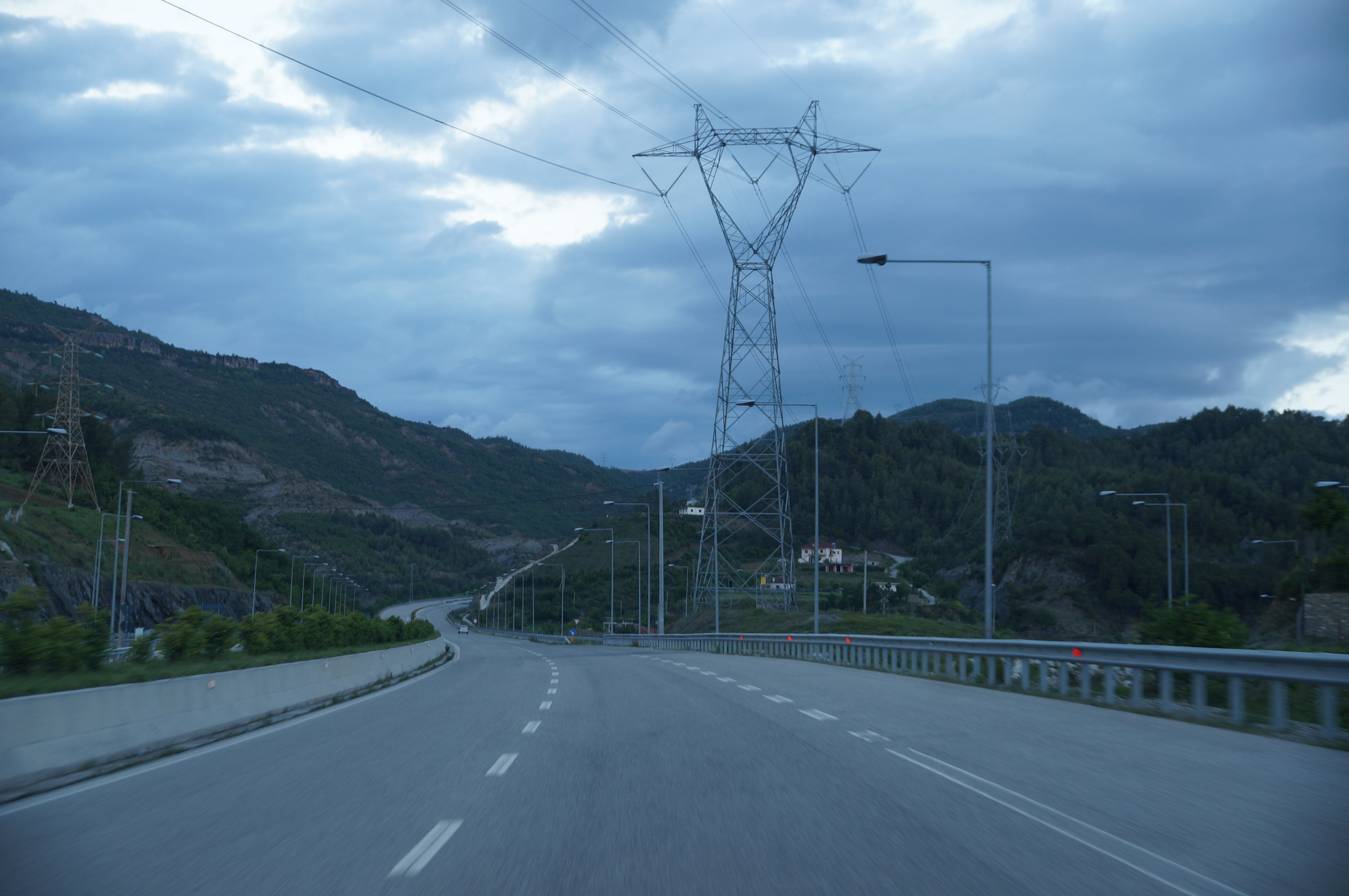
A3 linking Tirana with Elbasan

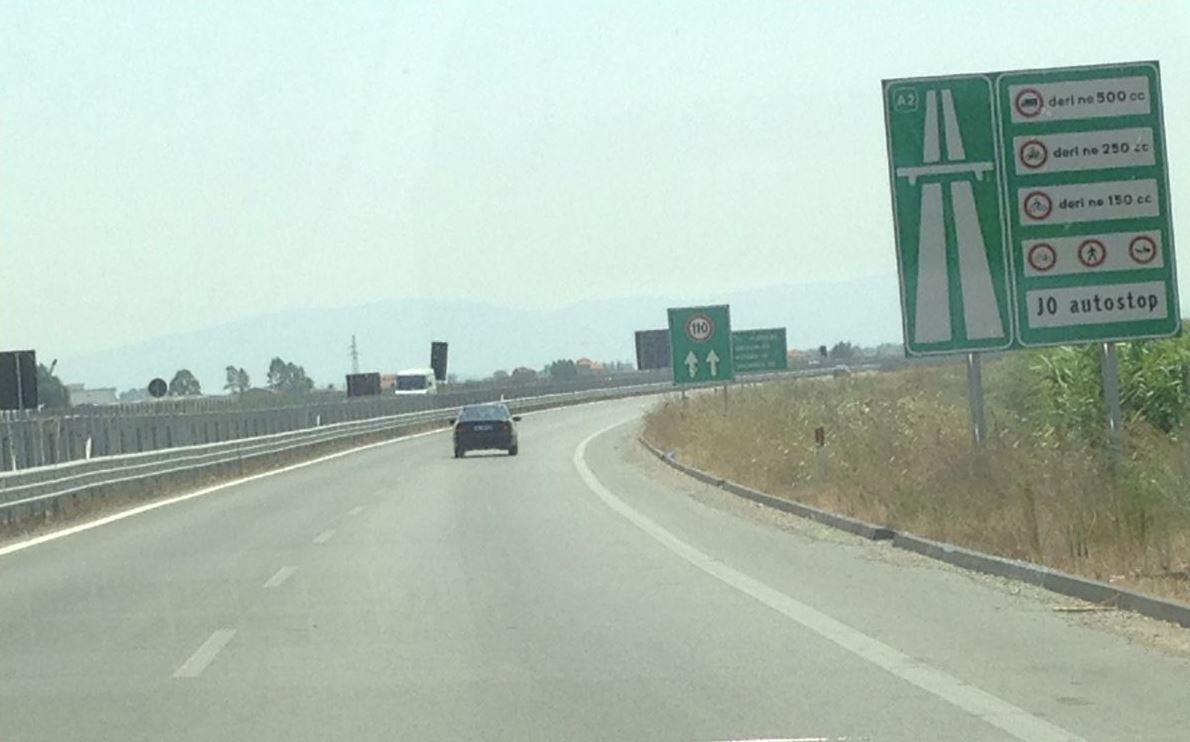
A2 near Narta Lagoon linking Fier Bypass with Vlorë Bypass in Southern Albania

=== Planned ===
- Muriqan – Balldren – Lezhë – Milot: Autostradë, part of the Blue Corridor or Adriatic-Ionian motorway
- Rrogozhine – Fier: Autostradë part of the Blue Corridor or Adriatic-Ionian motorway
- Perlat – Kurbnesh – Fushe Lure near Lure National Park
- Velipojë – Ulcinj (MNE)

=== Underway ===
- Labinot Fushë – Librazhd: Part of European Corridor VIII
- Rrogozhinë - Elbasan: Autostradë Part of Corridor VIII
- Tiranë Bypass (Motorway)
- Elbasan Bypass part of Corridor VII

=== Completed ===
- Tirana – Elbasan: Autostradë
- Fier Bypass: Autostradë
- Milot – Rrëshen – Kalimash – Kukës – Morinë: Autostradë, part of European Core Road Network's Route 7
- Tepelenë Bypass
- Lin – Pogradec: Superstradë
- Korçë – Qafë Plloçë: Superstradë (29 km)
- Milot Trumpet Interchange, part of Albania-Kosovo Highway
- Tirana Southwestern and Southeastern Outer Ring: Autostradë
- Rrogozhinë Bypass
- Durrës Bypass (Shkozet)
- Levan (Fier) – Vlorë: Autostradë, part of European Corridor 8. (24.20 km)
- Shkodër – Han i Hotit MNE, part of the European Core Road Network's Route 2
- Lezhë – Milot: Resurfacing, part of the European Core Road Network's Route 2
- Levan (Fier) – Tepelenë: Superstradë (70 km), part of the European Core Road Network's Route 2
- Durrës – Rrogozhinë: Autostradë (35 km), part of European Corridor 8.
- Tepelenë – Gjirokastër: Superstradë, part of the European Core Road Network's Route 2
- Lushnjë – Fier: Autostradë, part of European Corridor 8 (21.70 km)
- Himarë – Sarandë: Superstradë
- Han i Hotit – Tamarë – Vermosh – Dogana MNE
- Koplik – Dedaj – Bogë: Rrugë
- Fierzë – Bajram Curri
- Bajram Curri – Tropojë: Superstradë
  - K22 Valbonë – Dragobi – Bajram Curri
- Fushë Krujë – Krujë: Superstradë
- Dedaj – Razëm: Rrugë
- SH71 just south of Elbasan – E86 at Libonik
- Lushnjë – Berat
- Sarandë – Butrint: Superstradë
- Sarandë – Qafë Botë GR: Superstradë
- Bajram Curri – Margegaj: Superstradë
- Bogë – Theth
- Shkodër – Velipojë
- Tirana Eastern Ring
- Shkodër Bypass
- SH83 Kardhiq – Delvinë
- SH76, SH77 Vlorë River Highway: Vlorë – Kuç – Qeparo
- Vlorë Bypass
- Palasë – Dhermi
- Crossing of TEG
- Orikum – Dukat (Links with Llogara Tunnel)
- Thumanë – Kashar: Autostradë part of the Blue Corridor or Adriatic-Ionian motorway
- Llogara Tunnel
- Ura e Drinit i ri (Kukës)
- Korçë – Ersekë
- Tirana Northern Outer Ring
- Arbër Highway: Tirana - Bulqizë, Shupenzë - Maqellare - Peshkopi: Superstradë
- Shëngjin – Velipojë
- Tirana – Durrës: Expanding to 3 lanes in each direction, plus emergency lane
- Qukës – Qafë Plloçë: Superstradë
- Most coastal roads
- Other rural segments

== See also ==
- List of national roads and motorways in Albania
- Economy of Albania
- Transport in Albania
- Tourism in Albania
