= Libonik =

- Administrative unit
- Location within Albania
- Coordinates: 40°45′N 20°43′E
- Country: Albania
- County: Korçë
- Municipality: Maliq

Population (2011)
  - Administrative unit: 8,922
- Time zone: UTC+1 (CET)
  - Summer (DST): UTC+2 (CEST)
- Postal Code: 7021
- Area Code: (0)866

Libonik is a village and a former municipality in Korçë County, southeastern Albania. At the 2015 local government reform it became a subdivision of the municipality Maliq. The population at the 2011 census was 8,922. The municipal unit consists of the villages Libonik, Drithas, Vloçisht, Vashtëmi, Pocestë, Symiz, Klocë, Shkozë, Kembëthekër, Beras, Zboq, Memël and Manastirec.

== Transport ==
Libonik sits astride SH 71 where it meets European route E86/SH 3, continuing to the east as SH 101.
