= Tirana–Elbasan Highway =

National highway in Albania

- Rruga Tiranë-Elbasan

Route information
- Length: 16 km (9.9 mi)

Major junctions
- From: Tirana
- To: Elbasan

Location
- Country: Albania

Highway system
- Highways in Albania

The Tirana–Elbasan Highway is a four-lane highway in central Albania and part of the A3 motorway opened to traffic on 16 June 2013, and completed in the summer of 2019. It covers the distance between the cities of Tirana and Elbasan in the shortest way possible and its total length is 16 kilometres (9.9 mi).

== Financing ==
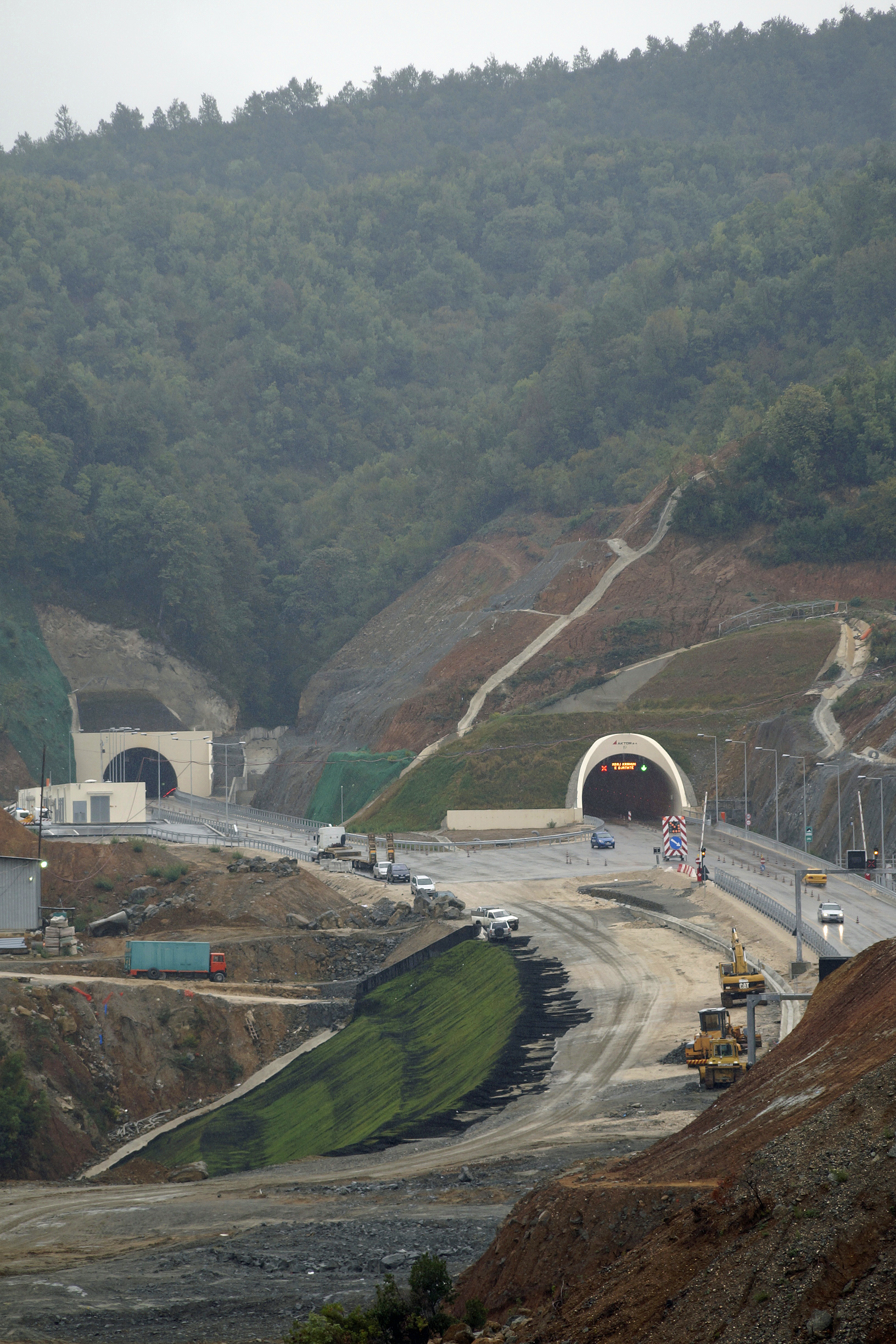
Krraba Tunnel

$223M from the Islamic Bank for Reconstruction has partly financed the road construction. The total construction cost is calculated at $400M. Other banks financing the highway are the OPEC fund, the Abu Dhabi fund, and the Saudi Fund for development.

== Characteristics and Krrabë tunnel ==
The most important section consists of the Krrabe Tunnel, whose length is about 4.9 km. The highway was opened to traffic when the construction of the entire route from Tirana to Elbasan was finalized as projected in June 2013 (18 months construction time). The highway was symbolically inaugurated by the former Albanian prime minister Sali Berisha on Sunday June 16, 2013. The highway was built without proper geological study resulting in the collapse of a hill section near Ibe. As a result, the completion of the highway was only finalized in the summer of 2019.

As of August 2016, the Tirana – TEG and Krrabe Tunnel – Elbasan segments were fully functional. The Mullet–Ibe segment was only functional on one side of the highway while the TEG–Mullet and Ibe – Krrabe Tunnel segments were until summer 2019 under construction. Also, due to safety concerns, the Krrabe Tunnel was only opened to traffic to flow on one lane per direction.
