= Rogozin =

Rogozin (Russian: Рогозин) is a Russian male surname, its feminine counterpart is Rogozina. Notable people with the surname include:

- Dmitry Rogozin (born 1963), former Deputy Prime Minister of Russia
- Georgy Ragozin (1942–2014), Major General of the Russian Federal Security Service

== See also ==
- Ragozin
- Rogosin
- Rogozhin
- Rogozov
