= Bickë =

- Village
- Location within Albania
- Coordinates: 40°41′36″N 20°38′29″E
- Country: Albania
- County: Korçë
- Municipality: Maliq
- Administrative unit: Maliq

Population (2000)
  - Total: 502
- Time zone: UTC+1 (CET)
  - Summer (DST): UTC+2 (CEST)

Bickë is a community in the Korçë County, Albania. It is part of the municipality Maliq.
