= SH 2 (Albania) =

National highway in Albania

National Road SH2
- Rruga shtetërore SH2

Route information
- Part of E762
- Length: 33 km (21 mi)

Location
- Country: Albania
- Counties: Durrës, Tirana

Highway system
- Highways in Albania

The Albanian State Road 2 (SH2), (Albanian: Rruga Shteterore 2) is a dual carriageway in Albania linking the port city of Durrës with the metropolis and the capital Tirana. The road was the first highway to be reconstructed in Albania, following the Fall of Communism in 1991.

== Route ==
The National Road SH2 begins at the Port of Durrës in Durrës, at the Dajlani Overpass (Albanian: Ura e Dajlanit), bypasses Shijak, intersects with SH52 in Vorë, bypasses the road to Tirana International Airport, and ends at the Kamza Overpass (Albanian: Mbikalimi i Kamzës) in the outskirts of Tirana where it meets National Road SH1 heading to northern Albania. Once entering Tirana, the highway becomes the street named Rruga 29 Nëntori.

== Gallery ==
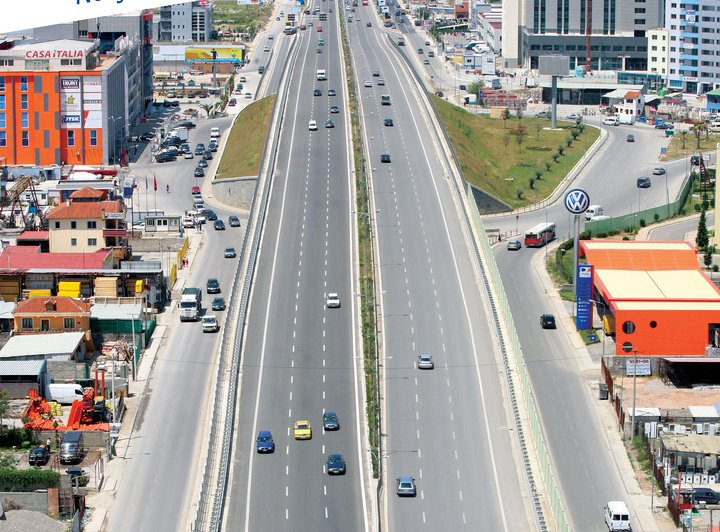
The SH2 Kamza Overpass in the outskirts of Tirana

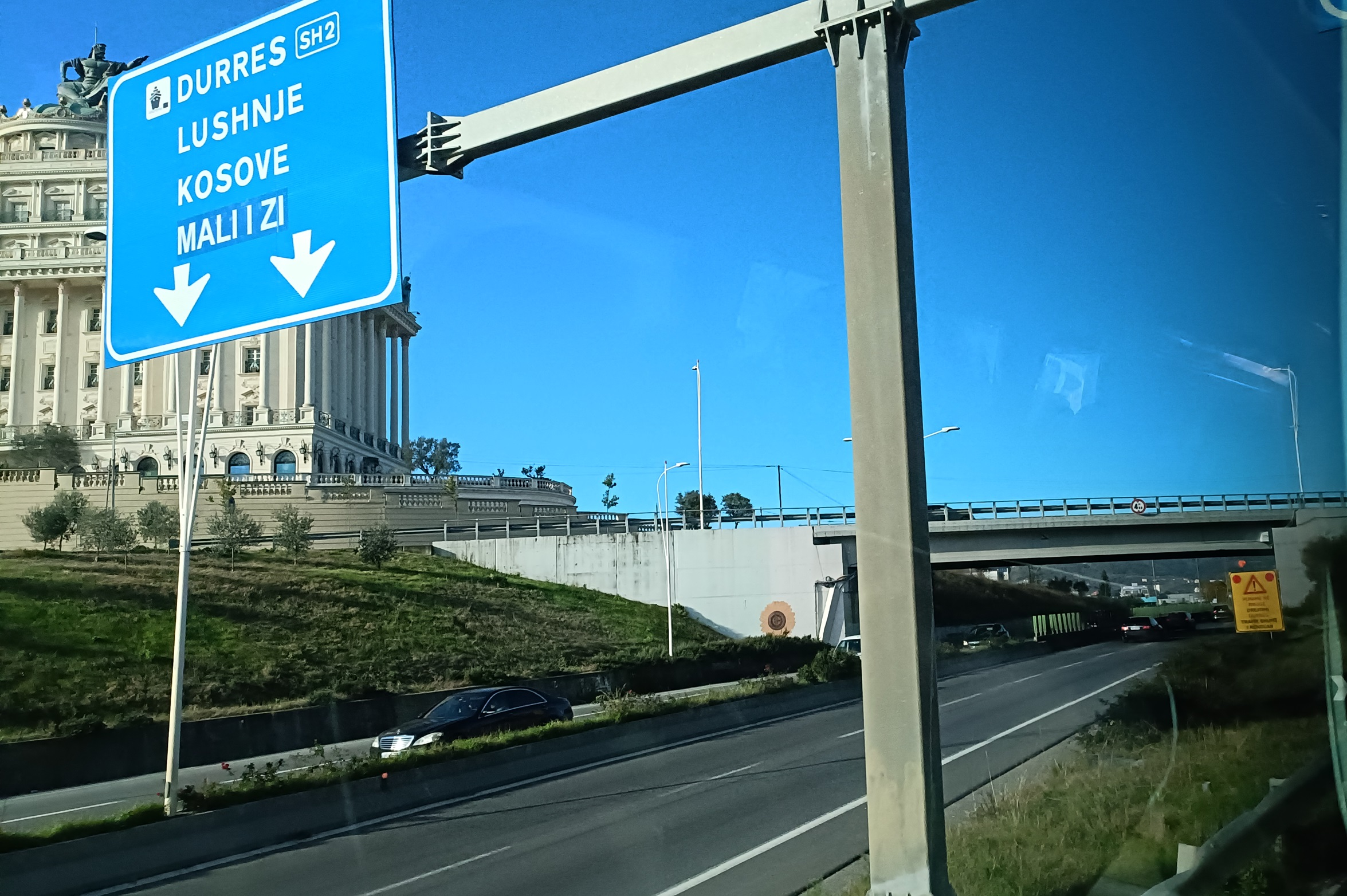
The SH2 at the junction for Tirana Airport

== See also ==
- Transport in Albania
- Economy of Albania
