= Rogozovka =

Rogozovka Рогозовка
- Selo
- Location within Amur Oblast Location within Russia
- Coordinates: 50°30′N 128°38′E
- Country: Russia
- Region: Amur Oblast
- District: Romnensky District
- Time zone: UTC+9:00

Rogozovka (Russian: Рогозовка) is a rural locality (a selo) and the administrative center of Rogozovsky Selsoviet of Romnensky District, Amur Oblast, Russia. The population was 291 as of 2018. There are 6 streets.

== Geography ==
Rogozovka is located 65 km southwest of Romny (the district's administrative centre) by road. Vysokoye is the nearest rural locality.
