= Qafë Thanë =

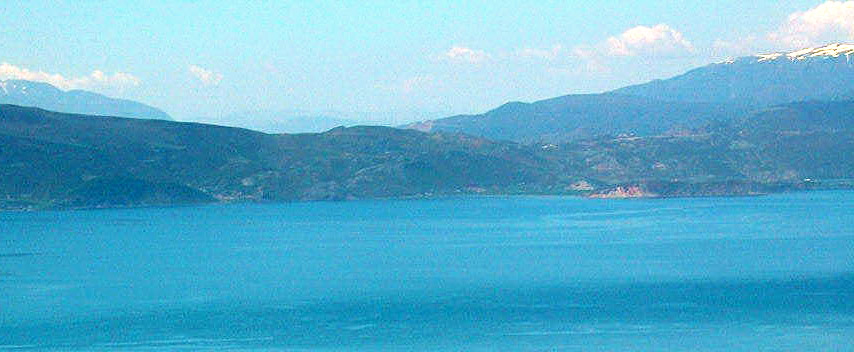
- Qafë Thana in Albania, as seen from the Macedonian side of Lake Ohrid

- Location within Albania
- Interactive map of Qafë Thanë
- Elevation: 937 metres (3,074 ft)
- Traversed by: E852 motorway

Third Approach
- Location: Albania
- Range: List of mountains in Albania
- Coordinates: 41°3′56″N 20°36′29″E

Qafë Thanë (Macedonian: Ќафасан) is a mountain pass on the shores of Lake Ohrid in Albania. It is located in the southeastern Albanian mountains, close to the border between Albania and North Macedonia. The border crossing point between the two countries is also named Qafë Thanë, and is a "primary gateway" between the two countries.
