= Maliq =

- Municipality
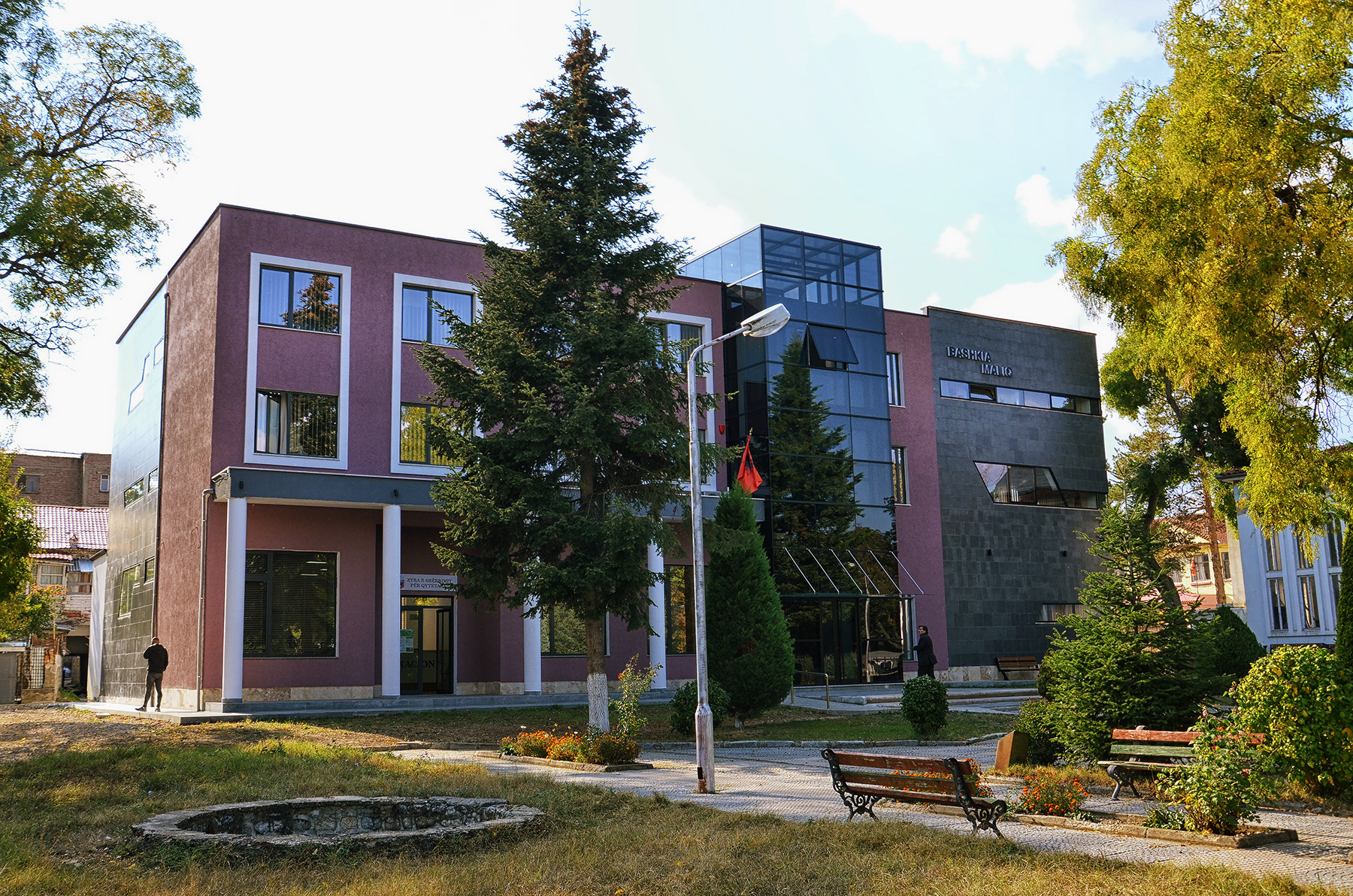
- City Hall of Maliq

- Emblem

- Location within Albania
- Coordinates: 40°42′30″N 20°42′0″E
- Country: Albania
- County: Korçë

Government
  - Mayor: Gëzim Topçiu (PS)

Area
  - Municipality: 656.89 km^{2} (253.63 sq mi)
- Elevation: 825 m (2,707 ft)

Population (2023)
  - Municipality: 31,008
  - Municipality density: 47.204/km^{2} (122.26/sq mi)
  - Administrative unit: 3,668
- Time zone: UTC+1 (CET)
  - Summer (DST): UTC+2 (CEST)
- Postal Code: 7005
- Area Code: (0)861
- Website: bashkiamaliq.gov.al

Maliq (Albanian definite form: Maliqi), formerly known as Malik (Albanian definite form: Maliki), is a town and a municipality in Korçë County of eastern Albania. It is the smaller of two cities in the district, the other being Korçë, 9 miles (14 km) southeast of Maliq. The current enlarged municipality was formed at the 2015 local government reform by the merger of the former administrative units of Gorë, Libonik, Maliq, Moglicë, Pirg, Pojan and Vreshtas. The seat of the municipality is the town Maliq. The total population is 41,757 (2011 census), in a total area of 656.89 km^{2}. The population of the former municipality at the 2011 census was 4,290. The municipal unit consists of the town Maliq and the villages Kolanec, Goce, Gjyras, Bickë, Fshat Maliq and Plovisht.

== Name ==
The name of the town derives from a patronymic, which is either the proper noun Mal ("mountain" in Albanian), suffixed with the diminutive -iq or a variation of the definite form of the Muslim name Melik (Meliki).

== History ==
The city of Maliq contains early Bronze Age archaeological sites, which offer evidence of cultural continuity of early Bronze Age peoples in the Balkans. The archaeological site of Maliq IIIa shows signs of pottery ware designs influenced by pottery styles in Bronze Age Greece. However, a stylistic break occurs in Maliq IIb site, where "cruder ceramic types, frequently including doubled handled vases and single handled cups, with no connection with earlier Eneolithic levels [of archeological digs]".

== Economy ==
The city of Maliq flourished around a sugar beet factory built in 1951. The factory was built with help from Soviet foreign aid. When the factory started operating it had a capacity of 1,000 tons to 2,400 tons later on. Eventually the factory was closed in the 1990s leading to a significant unemployment in the city. The story of the transformation of the swampland into a sugar factory site is told and analyzed in the book Sugarland.

== Sports ==
The football team KF Maliqi is home to the city of Maliq. The team was founded in the late 1990s and its home ground in Jovan Asko Stadium, Maliq which has a capacity of 1,500 spectators. The owner of the team is the Municipality of Maliq and the president of the team is Gëzim Topçiu. The team is currently playing in the Albanian Second Division.
