= Ragozin =

Ragozin or Ragosin (Russian: Раго́зин) is a Russian male surname, its feminine counterpart is Ragozina or Ragosina. It may refer to

- Natascha Ragosina (born 1976), Kazakhstani professional boxer
- Nikki Ragozin Keddie (born 1930), American historian of Iran and Middle Eastern women
- Roman Ragozin (born 1993), Kazakhstani cross-country skier
- Tatyana Ragozina (born 1964), Ukrainian race walker
- Viacheslav Ragozin (1908–1962), Soviet chess grandmaster
- Zénaïde Alexeïevna Ragozin (1835–1924), Russian-American author

== See also ==
- Rogozin
- Rogozhin
