= Rogozhin =

Surname

Rogozhin (Russian: Рогожин) is a Russian male surname, its feminine counterpart is Rogozhina. It may refer to

- Anatoly Rogozhin, Russian officer who was the last commander of the Russian Corps in Serbia during World War II
- Sergey Rogozhin (1956–1983), Russian Olympic equestrian
- Lyudmila Rogozhina (born 1959), Ukrainian basketball player

== See also ==
- Rogozin
- Ragozin
