= Albanian Road Authority =

- Autoriteti Rrugor Shqiptar
- Logo of ARrSh

Agency overview
- Formed: 15 October 2009
- Preceding agency: General Roads Directorate (Drejtoria e Pergjithshme e Rrugeve)
- Jurisdiction: Albania
- Headquarters: Tirana
- Employees: 166
- Minister responsible: Belinda Balluku, Minister of Infrastructure and Energy
- Agency executive: Gentian Gjyli, Director General
- Website: www.arrsh.gov.al

The Albanian Road Authority (Albanian: Autoriteti Rrugor Shqiptar) or (ARrSh), is an independent, public institution in Albania, whose purpose is to construct and maintain roads and infrastructure in rural areas and between urban areas. It belongs to the Ministry of Infrastructure and Energy and is the legal owner of the roads and has the authority to execute construction of infrastructures on demand from the ministry.

== See also ==
- Transport in Albania
- Highways in Albania
