= European route E852 =

Road in trans-European E-road network

E852

Route information
- Length: 134 km (83 mi)

Major junctions
- From: Ohrid
- To: Tirana

Location
- Countries: North Macedonia; Albania

Highway system
- International E-road network; A Class; B Class

European route E 852 is a European B class road in North Macedonia and Albania, connecting the city Ohrid – border Albania.

== Route ==
- North Macedonia
- Ohrid - Struga - (North Macedonia) / border crossing
  - border Albania
    - SH3 Librazhd-Elbasan-Tirane (Tentative)

== Notes ==
Road signs on the A3 motorway (Tirane-Elbasan) include E852 in both directions.
