= Rruga e Kombit =

Toll motorway in Albania

A1 motorway
- Autostradë A1
- Rruga e Kombit or SH10
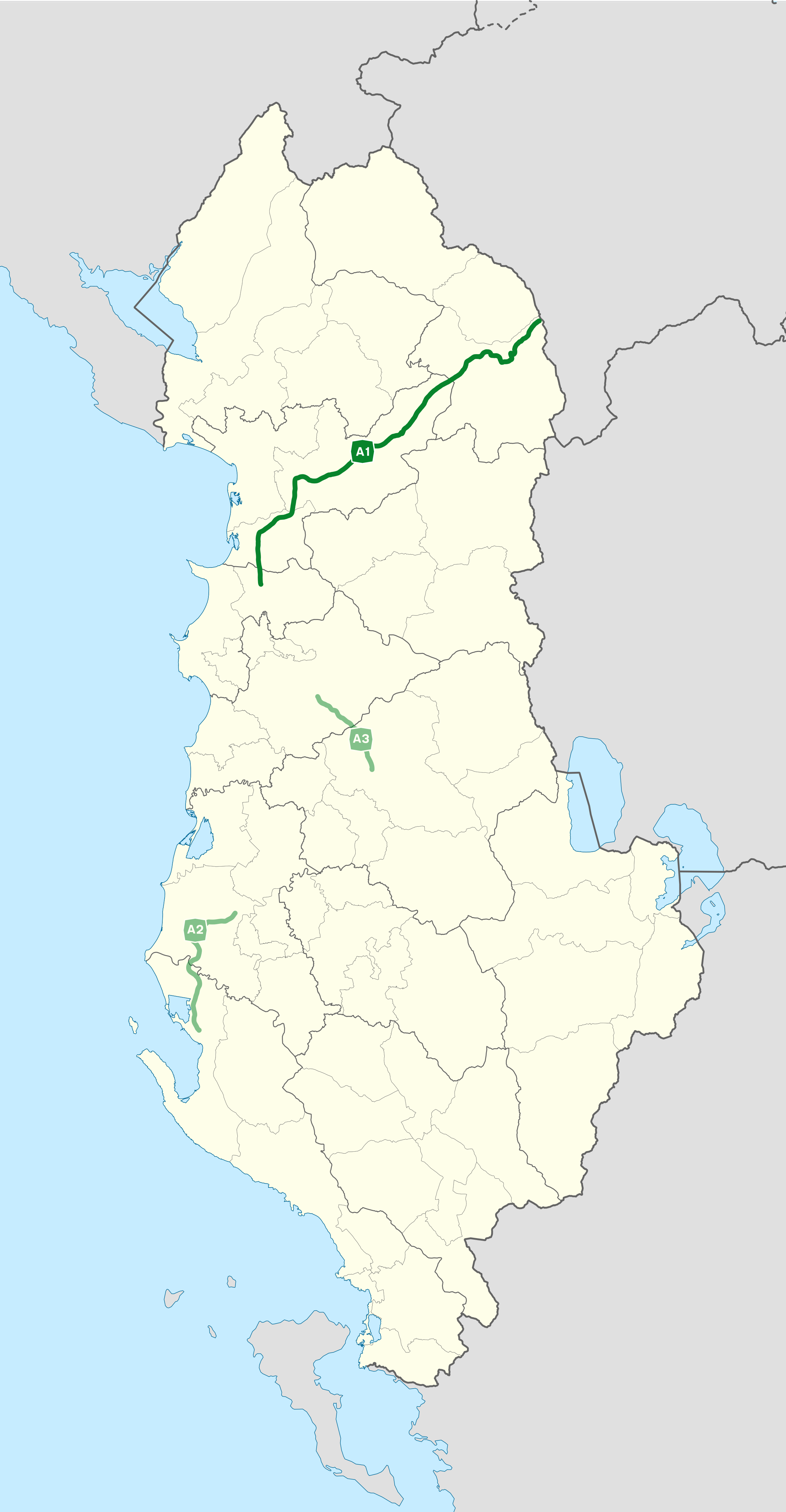
- Map of Autostrada 1 (A1) or Rruga e Kombit, denoted in dark green

Route information
- Part of E851 and E762
- Length: 148 km (92 mi)

Major junctions
- North end: in Morine/Verbnice border crossing with Kosovo
- South end: SH2 at Kashar Interchange

Location
- Country: Albania
- Counties: Lezhë, Kukës
- Major cities: Lezhë, Kukës

Highway system
- Highways in Albania

Rruga e Kombit (lit. 'The Nation's Highway'), or officially known as the A1 motorway (Albanian: Autostrada A1) or SH10 (Albanian: Rruga shtetërore 10), is the longest toll motorway in Albania, stretching 114 kilometres (71 mi) in the counties of Lezhë and Kukës. It consists for the most part of two traffic lanes and an emergency lane in each driving direction separated by a central reservation.

The motorway constitutes part of a larger corridor connecting the Albanian Adriatic Sea Coast in the southwest across the Albanian Alps with the Republic of Kosovo in the northeast. The significance of the motorway is reflected through its positive economic and cultural impact on the towns and cities within both countries it connects as well as its importance to tourism in Albania.

The highway is also commonly known as Autostrada Shqipëri-Kosovë or Autostrada Durrës-Kukës and starts near Kashar, Albania, passes through Kukës, enters Kosovo as R7, and ends in Pristina near Gjurgjica, Kosovo. As part of the South-East European Route 7, the highway will connect the Adriatic Sea ports of Durrës and Shëngjin in Albania via Pristina, with the E75/Corridor X near Niš, Serbia. The project was a joint venture by the American-Turkish consortium Bechtel-ENKA, Austrian, Slovenian, and Albanian companies. It is expected to be finalized through a PPP road concession and maintenance project operated by Albanian Highway Concession shpk.

Dubbed the “patriotic highway”, the project links Albanians in Kosovo and Albania, helping to boost cultural and economic ties. The project is Albania's largest in decades, costing over one billion euros. It includes a 6-kilometre (3.7 mi) tunnel, making travel and trade easier for the hundreds of thousands of people vacationing in Albania during summer holidays and for business.

== Description ==
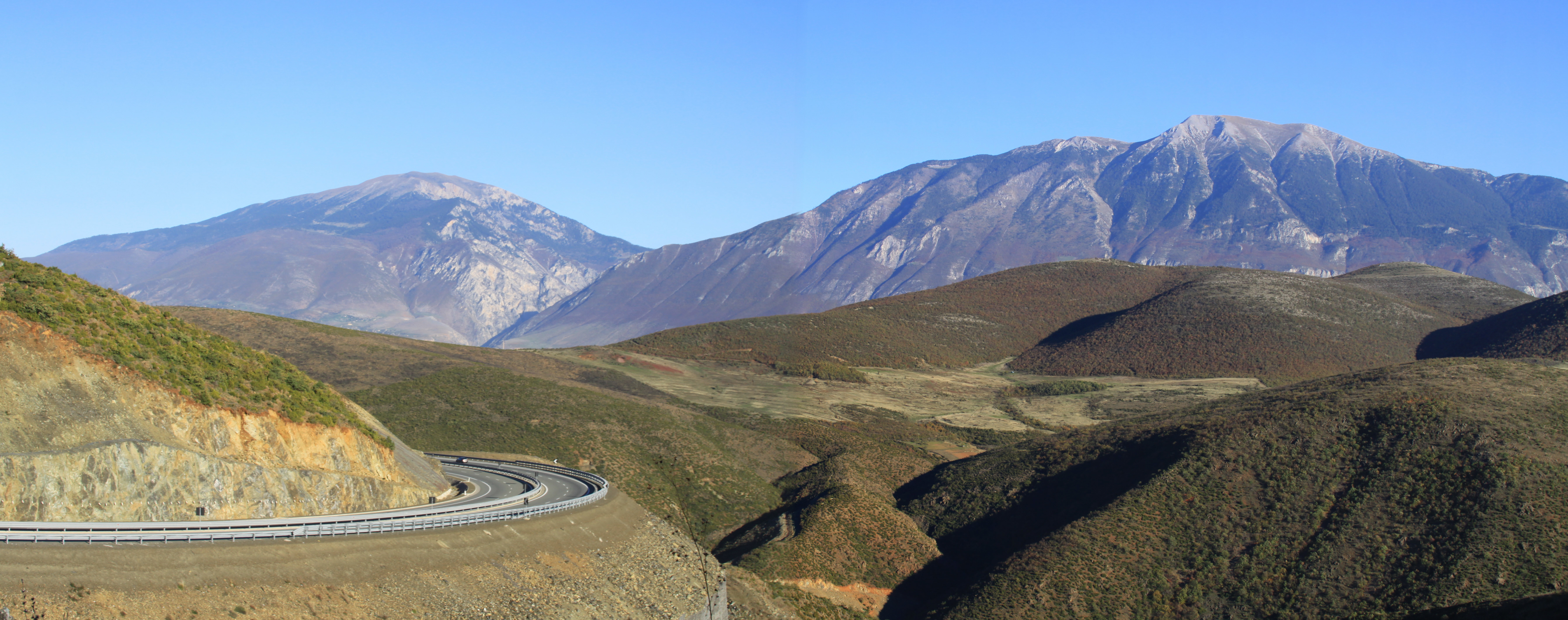
A1 passes mostly through mountainous terrain. Near the city of Kukës it connects with the National Road 5 (SH5) as a dual carriageway.

A1 Motorway represents a major northeast–southwest motorway in Albania connecting the Albanian Adriatic Sea Coast in the southwest to the Albanian Alps in the northeast. A significant part of the road network of Albania, it constitutes part of the European route E851 starting at Petrovac in Montenegro across Shkodër and Kukës to Pristina in Kosovo. The opened southwestern part of the motorway around Durrës County is considered to be a segment of the Adriatic–Ionian motorway that will stretch following completion across the Balkan Peninsula from Italy in the north to Greece in the south. In Kosovo, the A1 continues as the R7 part of the Pan-European Corridor X.

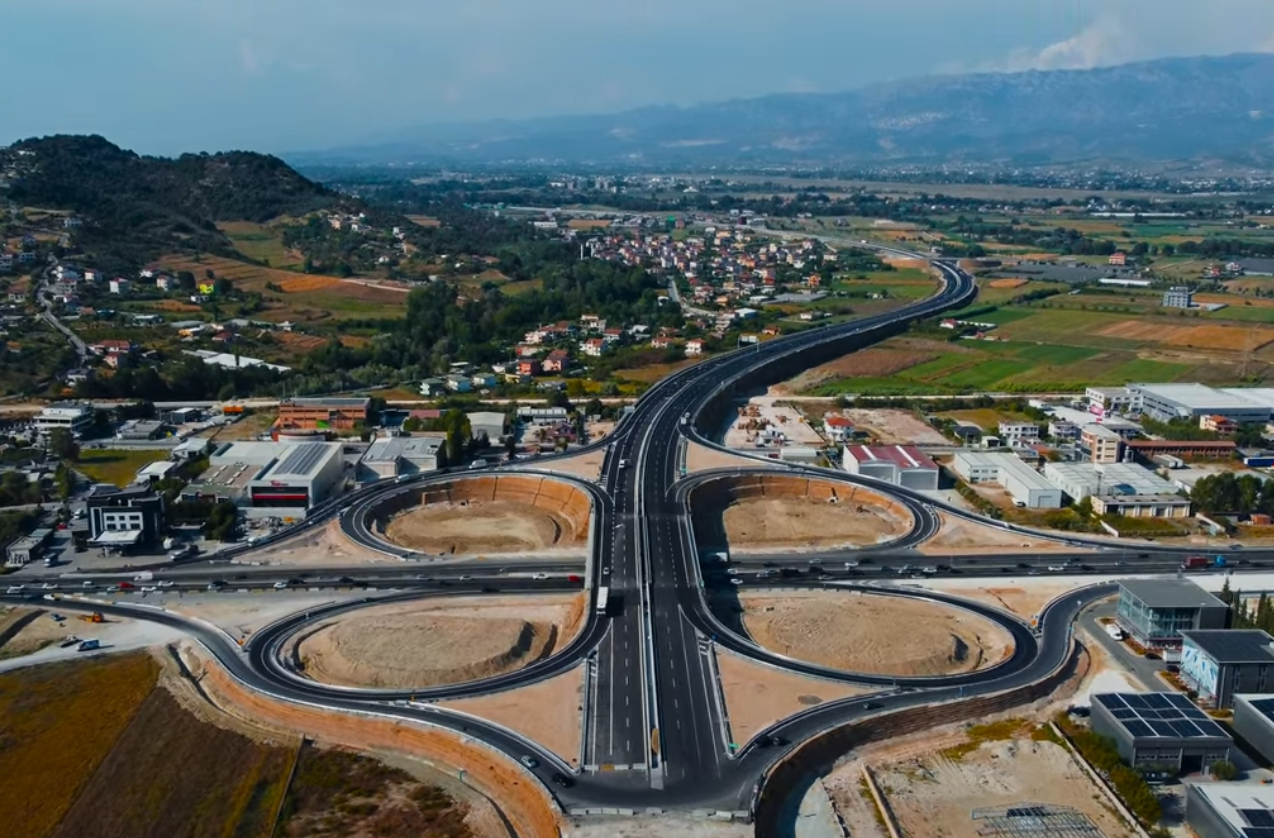
A1 interchange in Kashar

Rruga e Kombit (Nation's Highway) is a toll highway stretching between Kashar, Thumanë, Milot, Rrëshen, Kalimash, Kukes and the border with Kosovo in Northern Albania part of the Durrës-Kukës Corridor. In June 2009, the highway was opened to traffic with the inauguration of the Thirrë-Kalimash Tunnel, while other sections were partially completed in subsequent years as the highway is still under construction.

Once the motorway became tolled in 2018, the security and configuration of remaining segments between Kolsh, Kukës, and Morinë (border with Kosovo) part of the SH5 Highway has drastically improved with the construction of new interchanges. The section between Milot and Rrëshen is a single carriageway, while several viaducts near Kukes were only recently expanded into dual carriageways. The Milot Interchange was completed as a trumpet interchange in 2019.

The highway has reduced the travel time from six hours to two, with an estimated speed of 80–110 kilometres per hour (50–68 mph). The highway has also boosted tourism in Albania and deepened the cultural and economic exchanges between Albania and Kosovo. As most tourists come through Kosovo, the laying of the highway make it easier to travel to the Durrës and Shengjin ports along the Adriatic Sea.

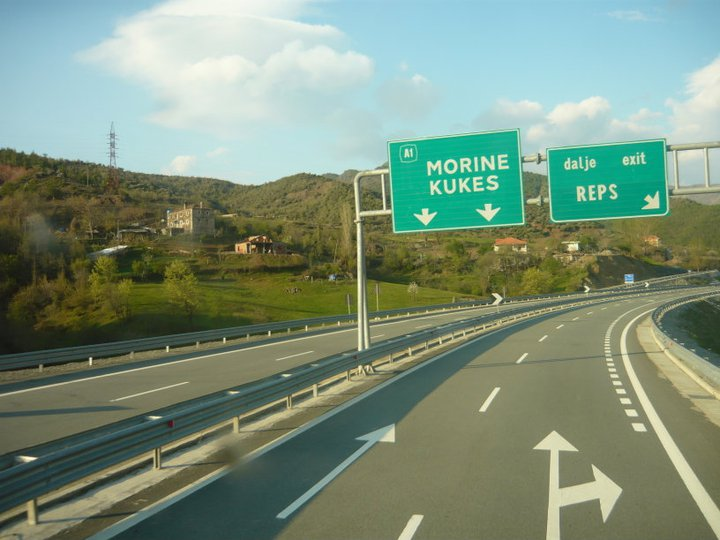
Scene on A1 Rreshen - Kalimash

The most challenging part of the corridor was the segment between Rrëshen and Kalimash, which is around 61 kilometres (38 mi) long. It was divided into three sections - a 19 kilometres (12 mi) stretch from Rrëshen to Reps, 27 kilometres (17 mi) from Reps to Thirrë, and 15 kilometres (9.3 mi) between Thirrë and Kolshi. A total of one tunnel and 27 viaducts have been constructed through the steep and mountainous terrain.

There are 17 viaducts in the area from Reps to Thirrë. The use of a hydro-powered electricity grid instead of diesel generators has helped in reducing the carbon footprint of the project. As a result, CO_{2} emissions have dropped by 613,000 pounds (278,000 kg) each month. The above segment as opposed to the other ones is of a higher quality both for security and construction parameters.

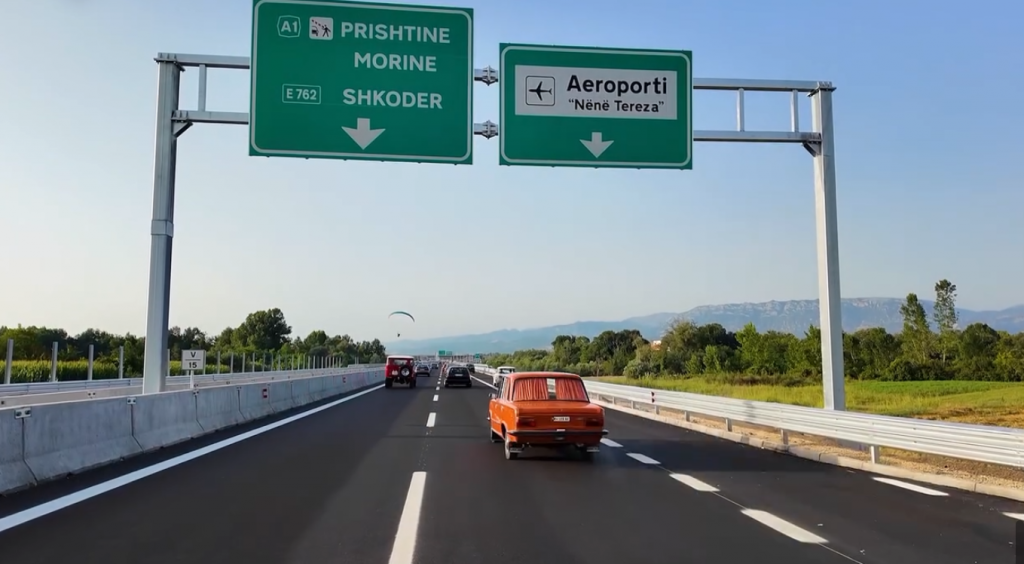
A1 highway near toll booth towards Tirana Airport intersection

In Late June 2024, the Thumanë-Kashar highway opened as part of the Adriatic-Ionian motorway, the segment between Thumanë and Kashar consists of around 20 kilometres (12 mi) long. A total of 2 intersections, 11 bridges and 12 underpasses.

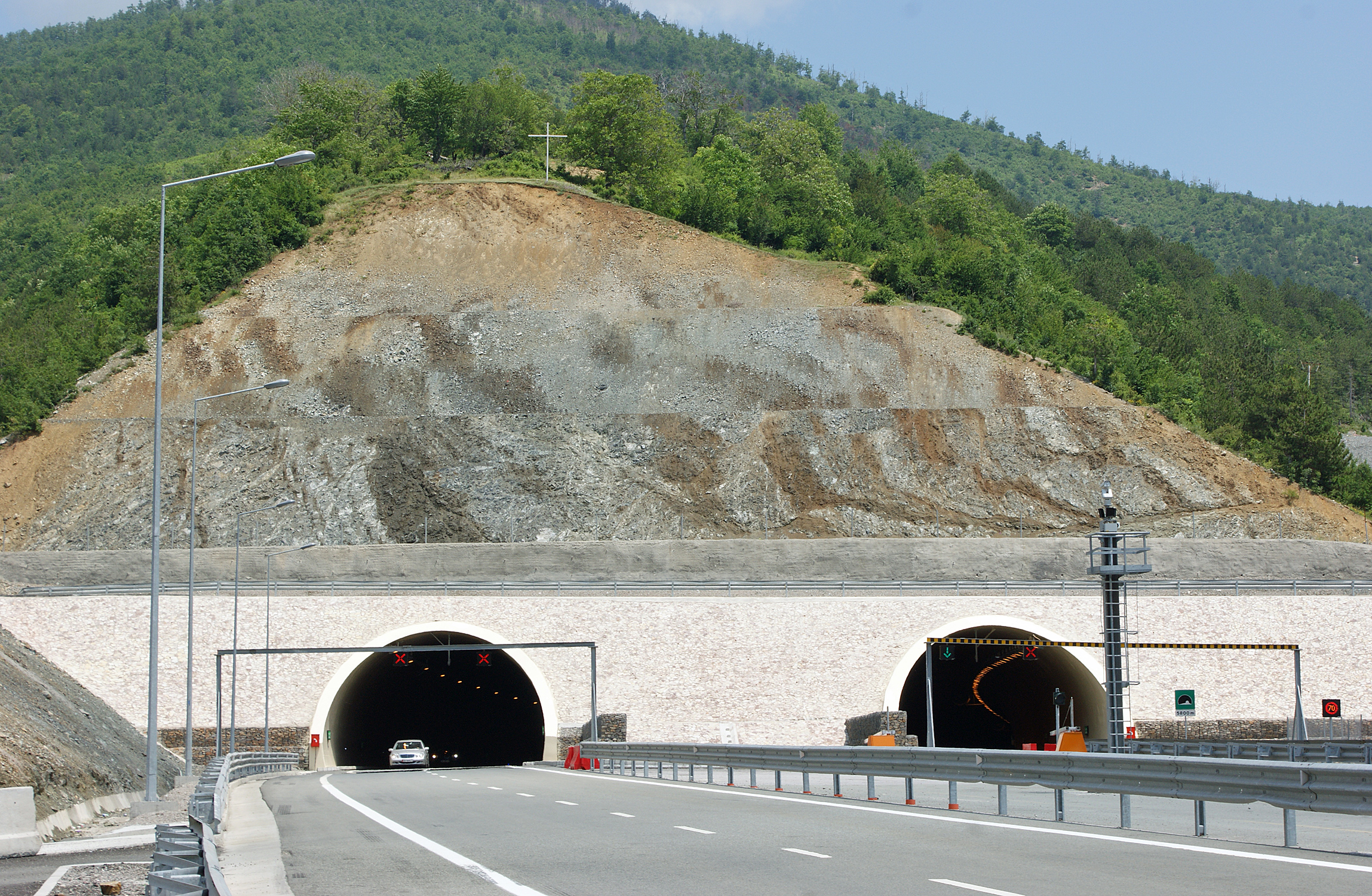
Kalimashi Tunnel entrance at Thirrë

The highway passes through a 5.5 kilometres (3.4 mi)-long double-bore tunnel. Construction works on the tunnel began in May 2007 and were completed with one tunnel tube inaugurated in June 2009. The south-bound tunnel was completed in July 2010.

All four faces of the two tubes of the tunnel have been worked on simultaneously. Rrëshen - Kalimash segment's third section of road between Thirrë and Kolshi included Mt. Runes at an elevation of 1,858 metres (6,096 ft). Laying road on Mt. Runes proved to be a challenge for the engineers. Another challenge was the transportation of construction equipment and material. As about 3,800 people worked on the project, there was the additional responsibility of feeding, clothing and housing them. A partial collapse occurred at a 50 metres (160 ft) section in the central-south bore of thetunnel in November 2009. No injuries or equipment damages were reported. The collapse occurred because of heavy overbreak (during excavation) at a geologically complex area inside the tunnel and delayed the completion of the south-bound tunnel. During the tunnel construction, the tunneling team encountered five types of rock. In fact, only the north-bound tunnel was opened as per schedule in June 2009.

=== Tolling ===
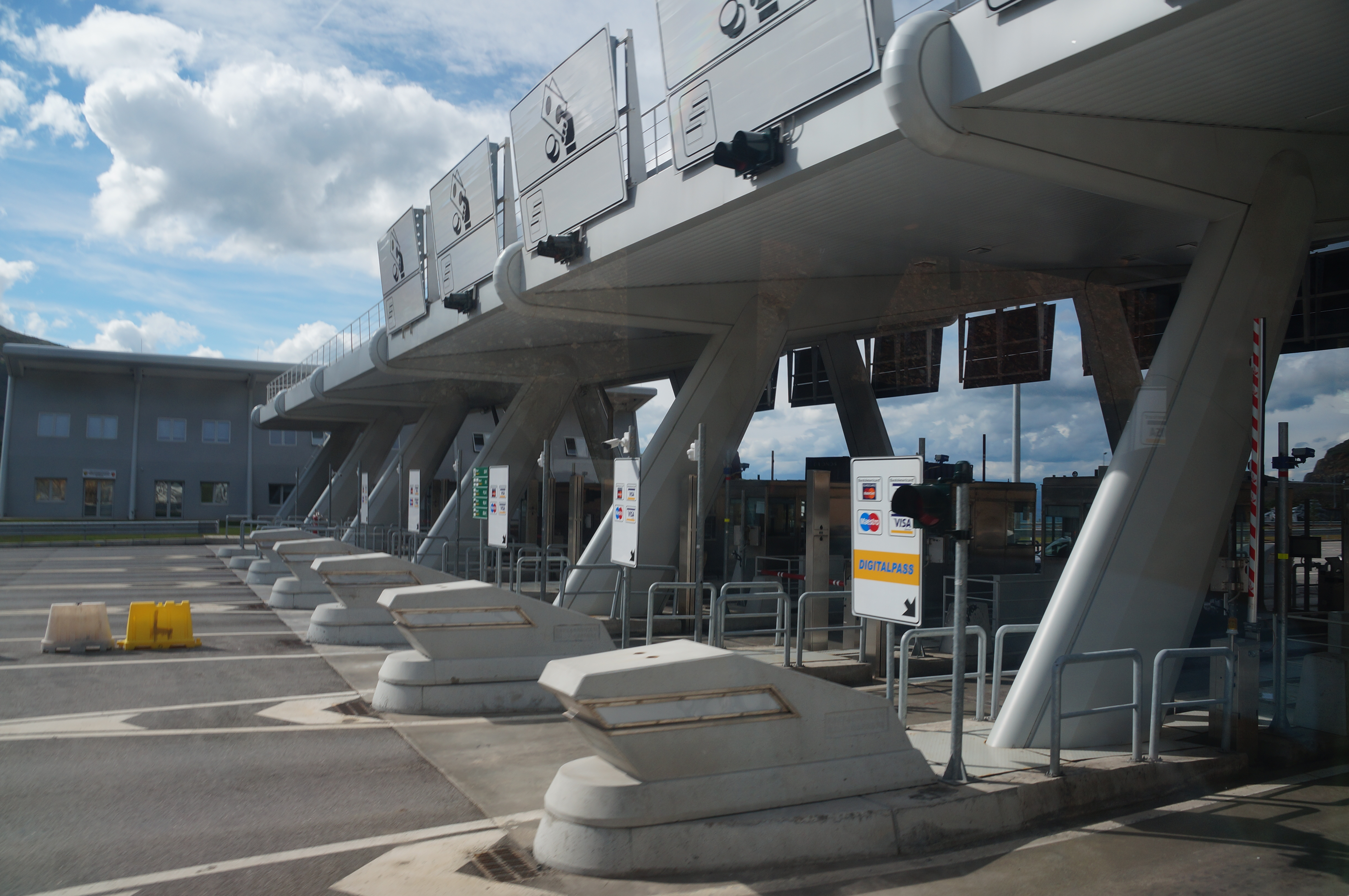
Albanian Highway Concession Toll Plaza

Since 2018, A1 is operated by Albanian Highway Concession shpk. Toll booths were installed, and became operational in September 2018, east of the tunnel entrance at Kolsh, as part of making A1 the first toll motorway in Albania. Once the company took over the management of the motorway, significant improvements were made to the safety and design of the motorway. Such improvements include the construction of new interchanges, pedestrian overpasses, installing of fencing and electronic signage, expanding of viaducts, and the eventual construction of the new bridge over Drini River.

In March 2018, the motorway became a toll highway, but only temporarily. Such move was fiercely opposed by locals who claimed lack of consultation from the government and unaffordable fees. The protests turned violent and consequently made the government to withdraw from their position, and eventually consultations took place with the affected parties. After undergoing renovations, the toll plaza was finally re-opened in September 2018.

Toll booths have also been installed on the Thumanë-Kashar segment, with vehicle users paying a fee of €2.1 each way. Payments can be made in cash (local currency, Lek) and often in Euros. Electronic toll collection systems are in place, allowing for quicker transactions. These include contactless payment options and prepaid toll cards.

== Funding and Contractors ==
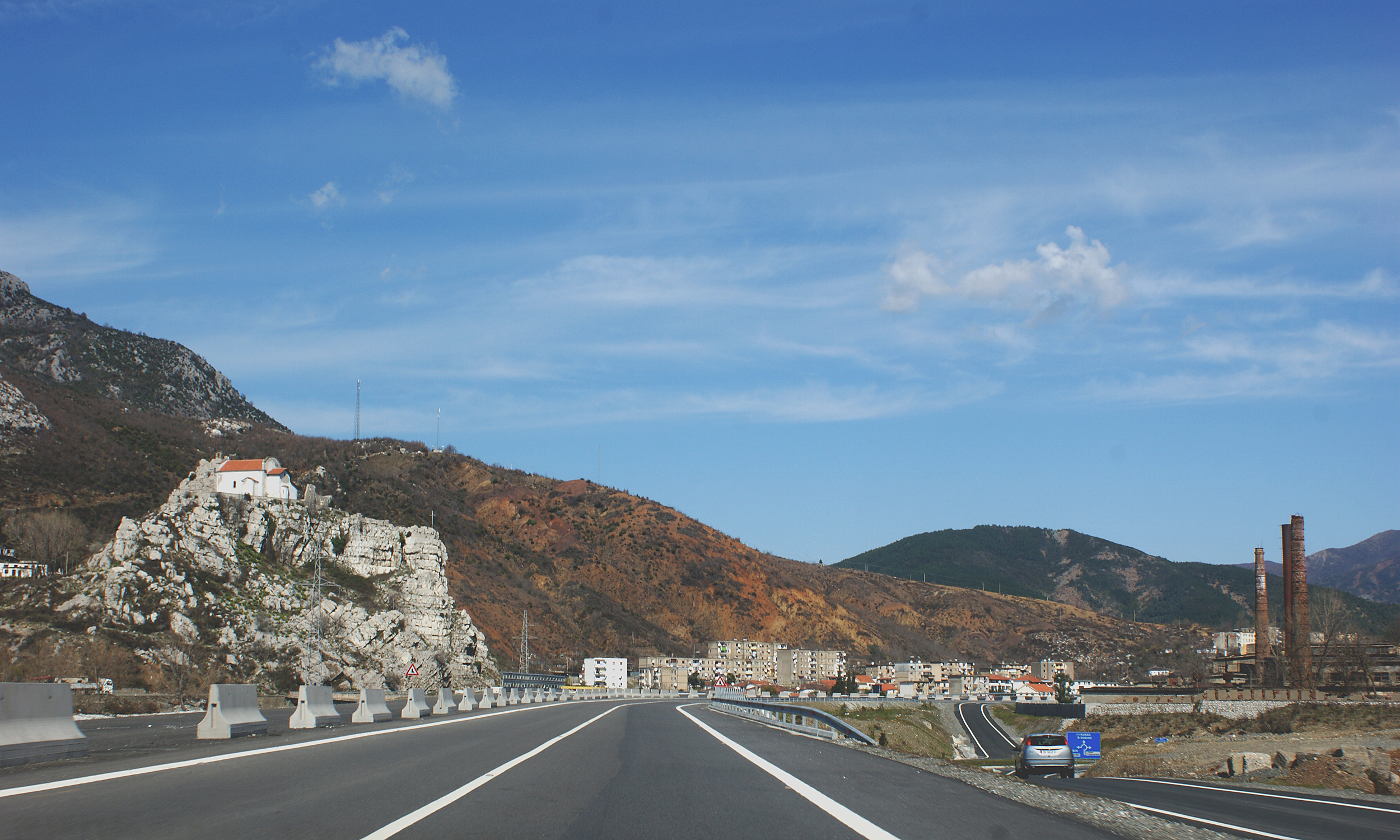
A1 becomes a single carriageway between Milot and Rreshen

The highway project is the biggest road infrastructure project ever done in Albania. Its initial cost was estimated at €600m but during the course of construction this has more than doubled. The project was financed by the government of Albania and some foreign lending institutions. The total cost of the highway is estimated to be over €1bn ($1.4bn). amid allegations of corruption and a growing public debt.

The contract for the construction of road segment between Rreshen and Kalimash, which constitutes one-third of the whole project, was awarded to a joint venture between Bechtel, a US-based engineering company, and Enka, a Turkey-based construction company. The contract was awarded in September 2006 and a majority of the construction works were completed by June 2009, even though construction on Milot-Rreshen started in 2003 by the government of Fatos Nano. Contractors working in the remaining portions of the highway were Albanian, Austrian, and Slovenian based firms. The R7 motorway in Kosovo was also constructed by Bechtel-Enka.

== Route ==
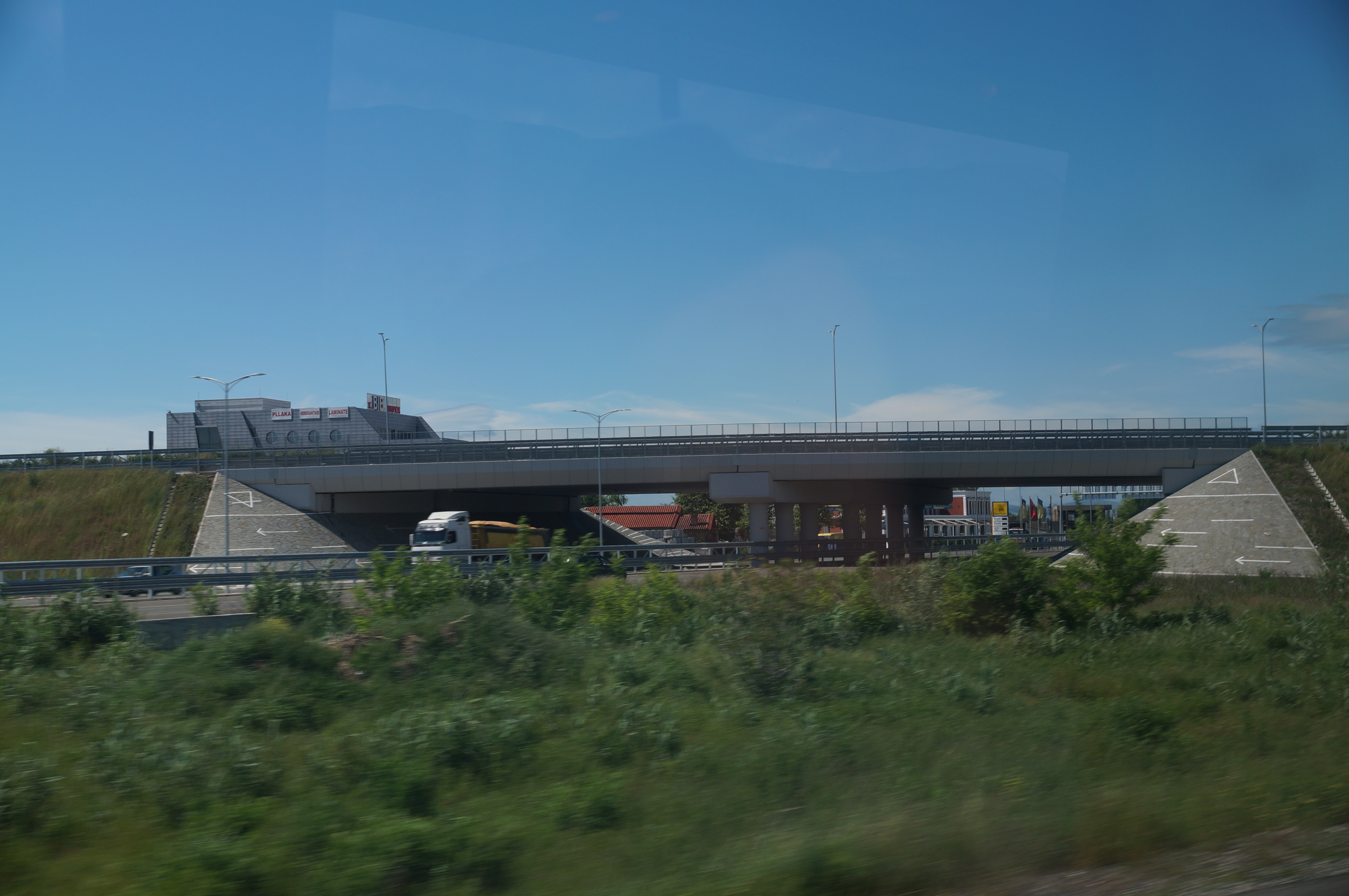
Milot interchange officially marks the start of A1 by linking with SH1 highway towards Tirana and Shkodër

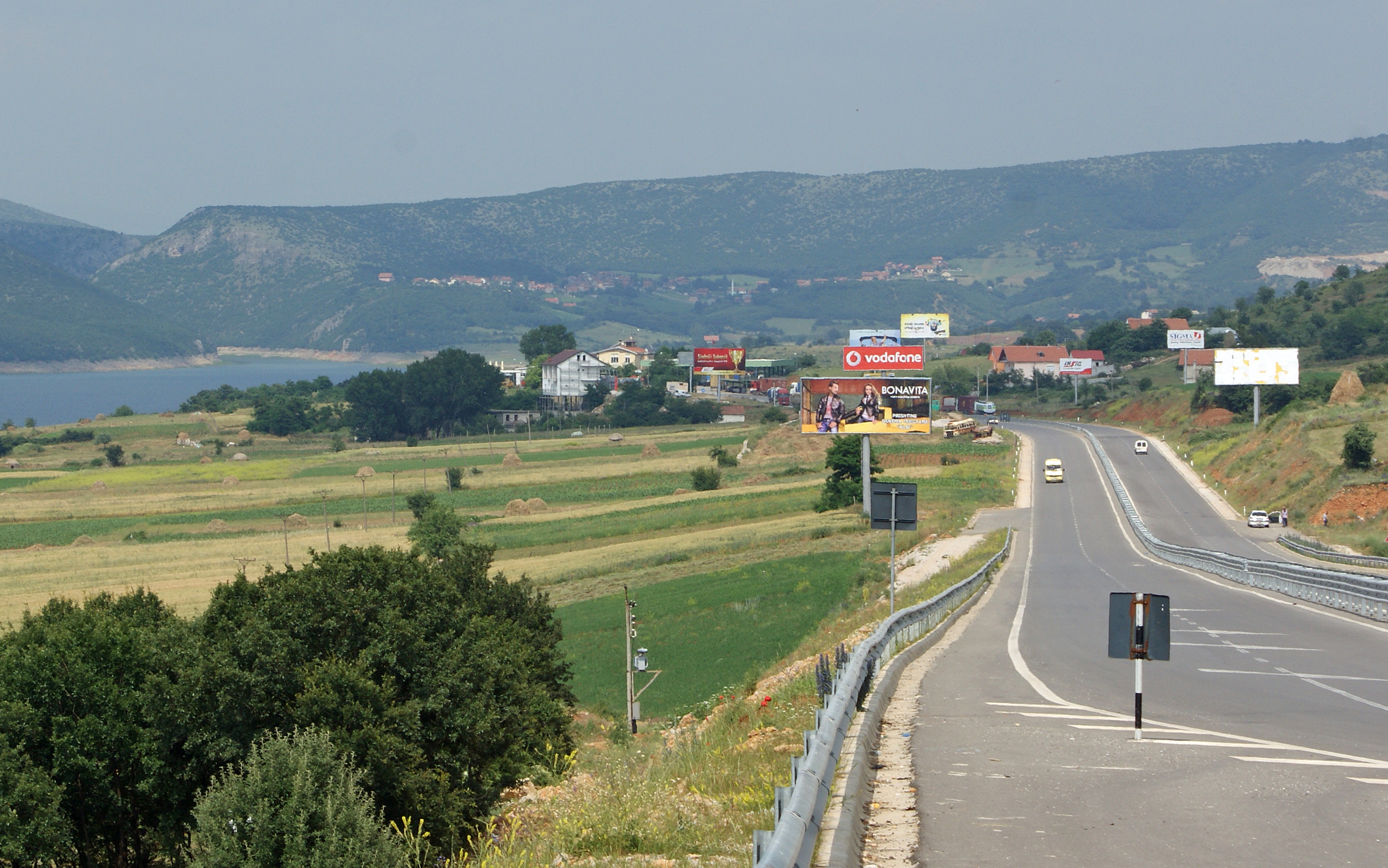
A1 as dual carriageway near the Albania-Kosovo border

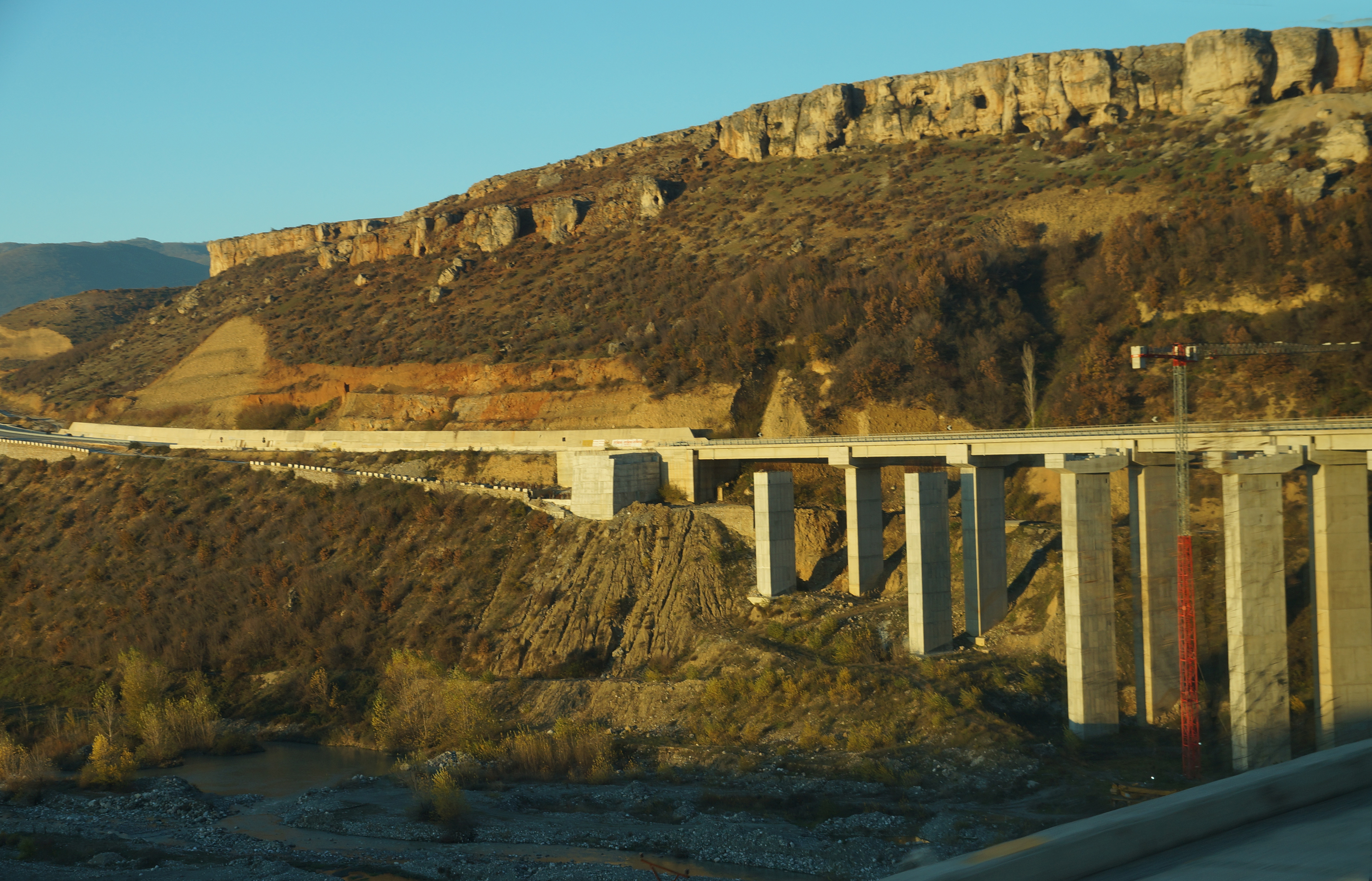
One of the several viaducts under construction near Kukes

Type	Destination	↓km↓	↑km↑	County	European road
	Tirana - Connection to Tirana - Durres	0		Tirana	
	Toll booth “Tirana Airport”	5.8		Tirana	
	Tirana International Airport	5.9		Tirana	
	“Europa Park” rest area	22		Durrës	
	Thumanë	23		Durrës	
	Mamurras			Lezhe	
	Laç	31		Lezhe	
	Lezhe - Shkodër	33		Lezhe	
	End of highway in operation beginning of a 25 km stretch of single-lane state road			Lezhe	
	Milot	38		Lezhe	
	Burrel and Shkopet	44		Lezhe	
	Rubik	50		Lezhe	
	Start of motorway in operation			Lezhe	
	Rreshen	53		Lezhe	
	Reps	77		Lezhe	
	Service area (Accessible southbound only)			Lezhe	
	Fan			Lezhe	
	Kalimash Tunnel (5490m)			Lezhe	
	Toll booth “Kalimash Tunnel”			Kukës	
	Kolsh			Kukës	
	Service area (south direction only)			Kukës	
	Mamëz			Kukës	
	Kukës Bridge			Kukës	
	Kukës West			Kukës	
	Kukës International Airport			Kukës	
	Kukës South			Kukës	
	Gjegjan			Kukës	
	Bardhoc			Kukës	
	Bardhoc I			Kukës	
	Morinë			Kukës	
	Border between Albania and Kosovo			Kukës	

== Impact ==
Since the end of the Kosovo War of 1999, hundreds of thousands of Albanians have passed through the old mountain road to get to Albania's beaches. Building a highway would "crystallize a year-round tourism industry and double the size of the Albanian market", while allowing both communities to rationalize agriculture. Travel times have been lowered to two and a half hours or less, down from seven through old mountain roads.

US Congressman Eliot Engel has compared Sali Berisha's vision to build this highway to that of Eisenhower to build highways across the United States.

== See also ==
- Motorways in Albania
- Transport in Albania
- Adriatic Ionian Corridor
