= Thirrë-Kalimash Tunnel =

Tunnel in Thirrë, Albania

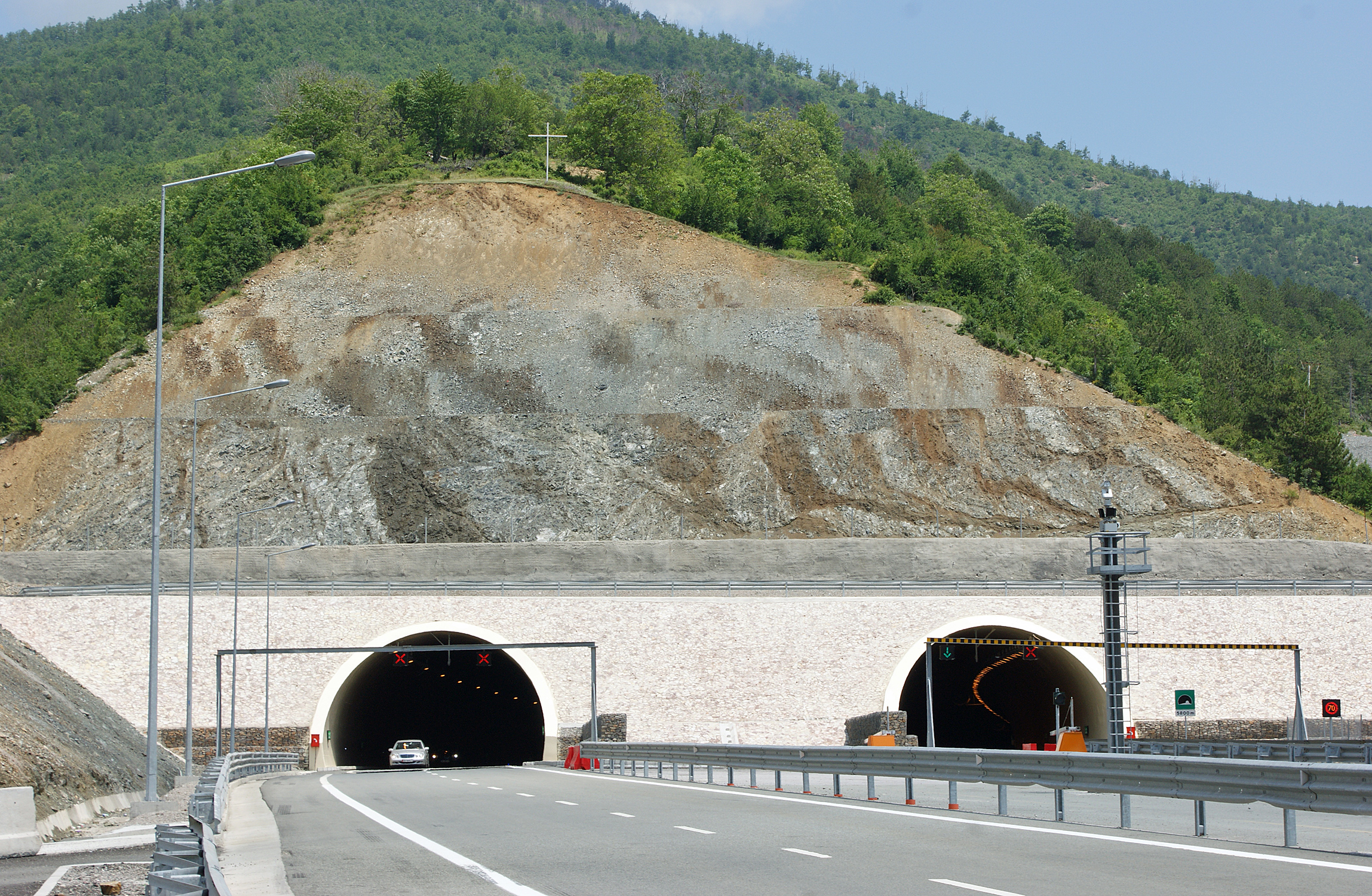
- Interactive map of Thirrë-Kalimash Tunnel

Overview
- Location: Albania
- Status: In use
- Route: A1
- Start: Kalimash (north)
- End: Thirrë (south)

Operation
- Opened: 2009
- Traffic: cars
- Toll: €2.5 (motorcycles) €5 (passenger cars) €11.3 (buses) €16.3 (medium trucks and heavy buses) €22.6 (heavy trucks)

Technical
- Length: 5490 m
- No. of lanes: 2 (per tube)

The Thirrë-Kalimash Tunnel is a highway tunnel in Thirrë, Albania, part of the A1 Albania–Kosovo Highway. It is part of the South-East European Route 7. The tunnel is of great importance and, combined with the highway, has reduced the travel time between Tirana and the Kosovo border from 8 hours to 3 hours, with an estimated speed of 80–110 km/h. It has served to boost Kosovan tourism in Albania and deepened cultural and economic ties between the two countries.

The structure is 5490 m long, which made it the longest tunnel in Albania when opened. However, it has since lost this title with the opening of the 5990 m long Llogara Tunnel on the SH 8.

In 2018, toll booths started being installed on the eastern extremity of the tunnel near Kolsh as part of making the A1 the first toll highway in Albania. As of 2024, toll booths are open and passenger cars are charged €5.

== Gallery ==
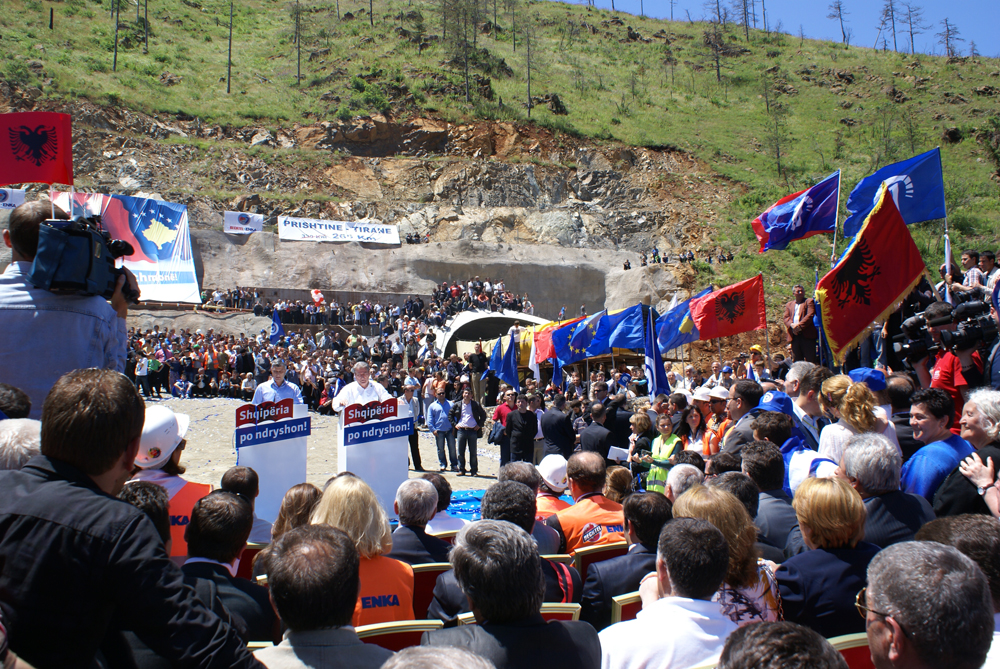
Opening of the Thirrë-Kalimash tunnel (2009)

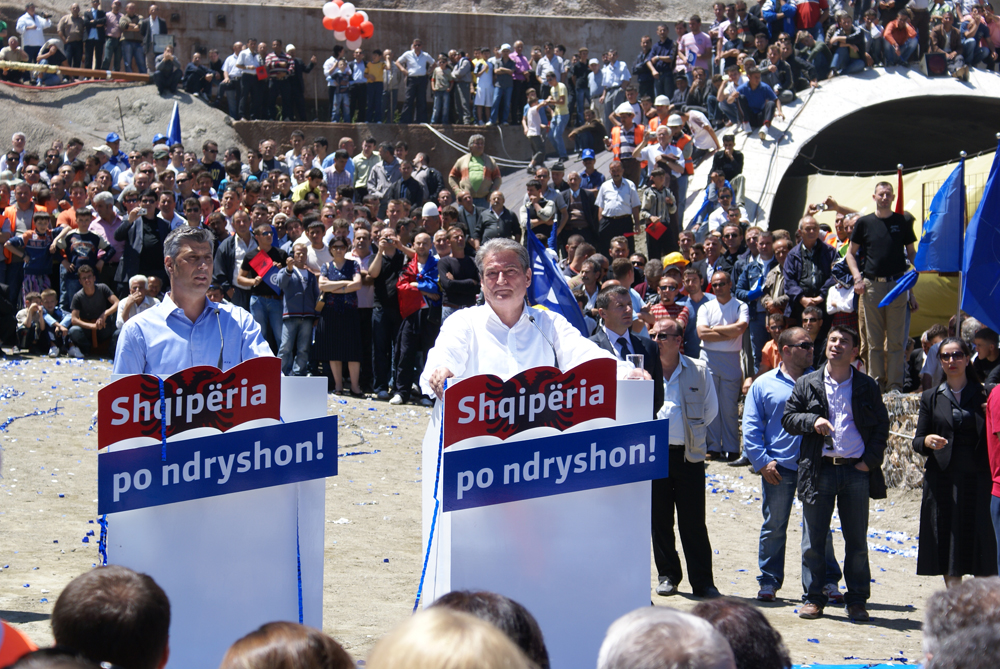
Hashim Thaçi and Sali Berisha speech

== See also ==
- Llogara Tunnel
- List of tunnels in Albania
