= List of tunnels in Albania =

This is a comprehensive list of tunnels in Albania.

== Roadway tunnels ==
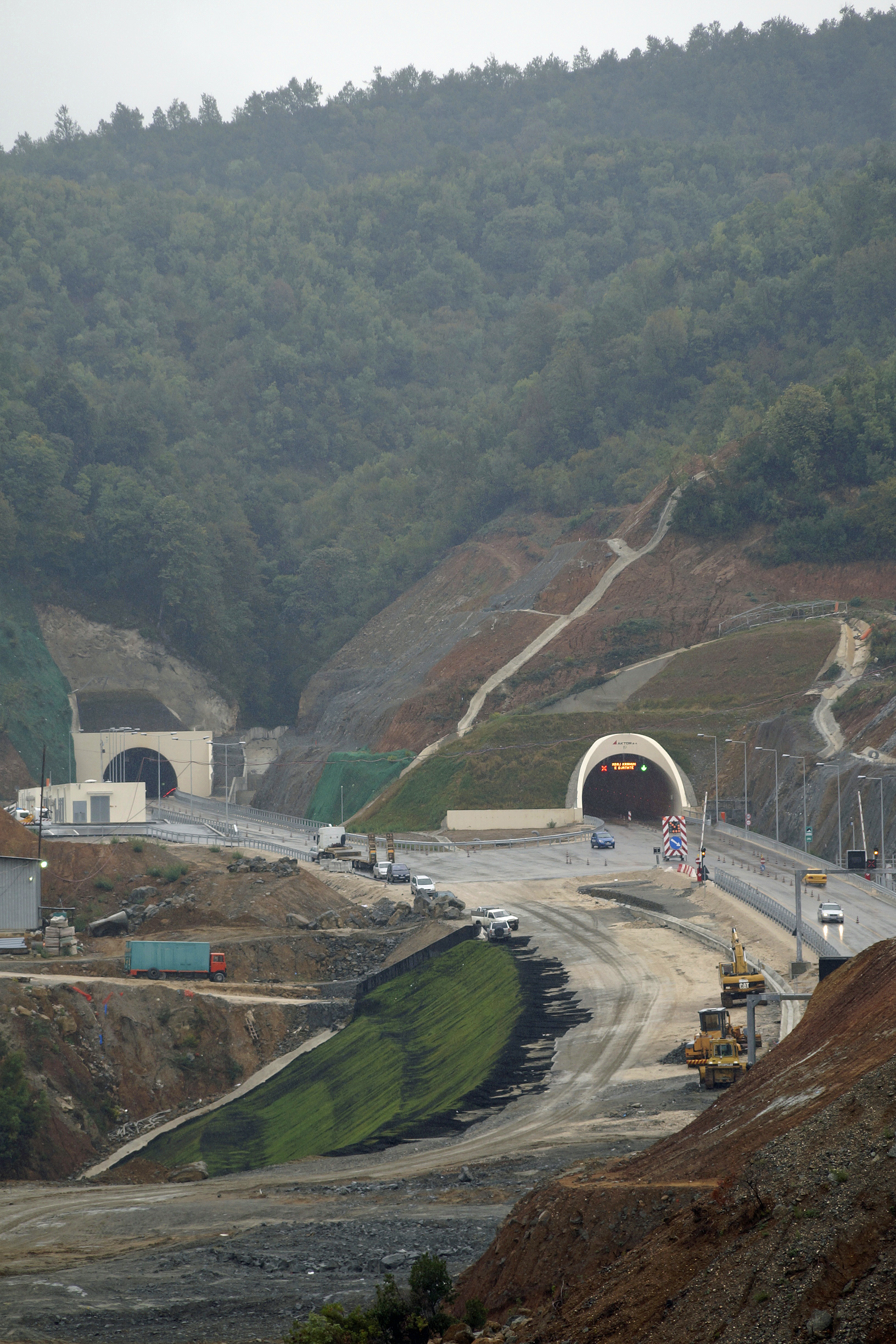
Krrabë Pass Tunnel in 2013

Name	Location	Length	Type	Builder	Opened
Llogara Tunnel	Vlorë	5.992 km (3.723 mi)	Single-bore	Gjoka Konstruksion	2024
Thirrë-Kalimash Tunnel	Kukës	5.55 km (3.45 mi)	Twin-bore	Bechtel, Enka	2010
Murriz Pass Tunnel	Dibër	3.789 km (2.354 mi)	Twin-bore	Gjoka Konstruksion	2025
Krrabë Pass Tunnel	Elbasan	2.58 km (1.60 mi), 2.32 km (1.44 mi)	Twin-bore	Aktor	2012
Skarficë Tunnel	Vlorë	1,316 m (4,318 ft)	Single-bore	Gjoka Konstruksion	2022
Balldren Tunnel	Lezhë	850 m (2,790 ft)	Single-bore	–	ongoing
Qukës-Qafë Plloçë Tunnels	Korçë	711 m (2,333 ft), 326 m (1,070 ft)	Single-bore	Albavia-Sintram	2020
Buall Pass Tunnel	Dibër	465 m (1,526 ft)	Single-bore	Gjoka Konstruksion	2015
Lin-Pogradec Tunnel	Pogradec	300 m (980 ft)	Single-bore	Pevlaku Sh.p.k	2019
Uji i Ftohtë Tunnel	Vlorë	116 m (381 ft)	Single-bore	Albanian State	2011
Tujan Tunnel	Dibër	70 m (230 ft)	Single-bore	Gjoka Konstruksion	2017

== Railway tunnels ==
The railway network consists of 25 tunnels at a length of approximately 11 km (6.8 mi).

Name	Location	Length	Type	Builder	Opened
Thanë Pass Tunnel	Librazhd	3.015 km (1.873 mi)	Single-bore	Albanian State	1979
Murrash Tunnels	Librazhd	918 m (3,012 ft), 250 m (820 ft)	Single-bore	Albanian State	1972
Koshovicë Pass Tunnel	Fier	758 m (2,487 ft)	Single-bore	Albanian State	1985
Bishqem Tunnels	Peqin	727 m (2,385 ft), 454 m (1,490 ft), 298 m (978 ft), 210 m (690 ft)	Single-bore	Albanian State	1950
Mirakë Tunnels	Librazhd	585 m (1,919 ft), 460 m (1,510 ft)	Single-bore	Albanian State	1972
Hotolisht Tunnel	Librazhd	414 m (1,358 ft)	Single-bore	Albanian State	1974
Rrogozhinë Tunnel	Rrogozhinë	390 m (1,280 ft)	Single-bore	Albanian State	1947
Bushtricë Tunnel	Librazhd	340 m (1,120 ft)	Single-bore	Albanian State	1974
Librazhd Tunnels	Librazhd	308 m (1,010 ft), 280 m (920 ft), 252 m (827 ft)	Single-bore	Albanian State	1974
Dragostunjë Tunnel	Librazhd	236 m (774 ft)	Single-bore	Albanian State	1974
Rrashbull Tunnel	Durrës	212 m (696 ft)	Single-bore	Albanian State	1949
Pishkash Tunnels	Librazhd	160 m (520 ft), 145 m (476 ft), 90 m (300 ft)	Single-bore	Albanian State	1974
Qukës Tunnels	Librazhd	120 m (390 ft), 100 m (330 ft)	Single-bore	Albanian State	1974
Xhyrë Tunnels	Librazhd	120 m (390 ft), 85 m (279 ft)	Single-bore	Albanian State	1974

== Underground tunnels ==
Name	Location	Length	Type	Builder	Opened
Fan River Basin Tunnels	Lezhë	13 km (8.1 mi), 12.5 km (7.8 mi)	Single-bore	Aydiner	2016
Moglicë Reservoir Tunnel	Maliq	10.7 km (6.6 mi)	Single-bore	Starkraft	2018
Skrapar Micro Tunnel	Skrapar	1.5 km (0.93 mi)	Single-bore	TAP AG	2018
Porto Palermo Tunnel	Himarë	1.28 km (0.80 mi)	Single-bore	Albanian State	1981

== See also ==
- List of tunnels by location
