= Përroi Batrës mine =

Chromium mine in Kukës, Kukës County, Albania

- Location in Albania
- Location: Kukës, Kukës County, Albania; 42°03′07″N 20°16′08″E
- Products: Chromium
- Opened: 1978
- Closed: 2000

The Përroi Batrës mine is a large mine located near the village Kalimash in northern Albania in Kukës County, 80 kilometres (50 mi) north-east of the capital, Tirana. Përroi Batrës represents one of the largest chromium reserve in Albania and one of the largest in Europe having estimated reserves of 1.2 million tonnes of ore grading 20% chromium metal. The mine is part of the Kukës Massif, a 108 square kilometres (42 mi^{2}) area which has a rock thickness between 4 kilometres (2.5 mi) and 6 kilometres (3.7 mi) and contains 54 verified chromium deposits and occurrences. The deposit has been explored to depths of up to 300 metres (980 ft) and the geological reserves amount to 6.8 million tonnes grading 21.4% chromium metal.

The Përroi Batrës mine began operating in 1978. The total combined chromium ore production from the mine between 1986 and 1998 amounted to 540,000 tonnes. The deepest level of the mine is the + 600 Level which reaches a depth of 300 metres (980 ft). The chromium ore reserves of the mine are split into two categories above and below + 600 Level. The proven ore reserves located above the + 600 Level amount to 1,200,000 tonnes of ore grading 20% chromium metal. The proven ore reserves located below the + 600 Level are currently not estimated or calculated but are expected to be grading over 30% chromium metal. The mine's total reserves amount to 1.2 million tonnes of ore grading 20% chromium metal. The chromium ore exploitation complex is located completely underground and has been shut down since 2000 due to financial difficulties. The Përroi Batrës mine is one of the eight Albanian chromium mines to have reserves of over 1 million tonnes of chromium ore.
