= Thirrë =

- Village
- Location within Albania
- Coordinates: 42°0′23″N 20°13′56″E
- Country: Albania
- County: Lezhë
- Municipality: Mirditë
- Administrative unit: Fan
- Time zone: UTC+1 (CET)
  - Summer (DST): UTC+2 (CEST)

Thirrë is a populated place in the former Fan municipality, Lezhë County, northwestern Albania. At the 2015 local government reform it became part of the municipality Mirditë. Near this village is the entrance of the Thirrë-Kalimash 5,6 km long tunnel part of Albania–Kosovo Highway.

== See also ==
- Thirrë-Kalimash Tunnel
