= Vlora-Otranto Tunnel =

Proposed tunnel beneath the Adriatic Sea

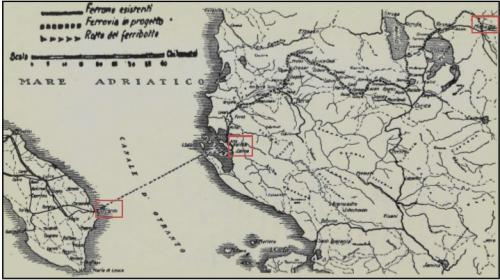
Strait of Otranto

The Vlora-Otranto Tunnel is a proposed undersea tunnel that aims to connect Vlorë, in Albania, with Otranto, in Italy, across the Strait of Otranto, a narrow strip of water that separates the Adriatic Sea from the Ionian Sea and is about 71 kilometers (44 miles) wide at its narrowest point.

== See also ==
- Llogara Tunnel
