= Llogara Tunnel =

Tunnel in the south of Albania

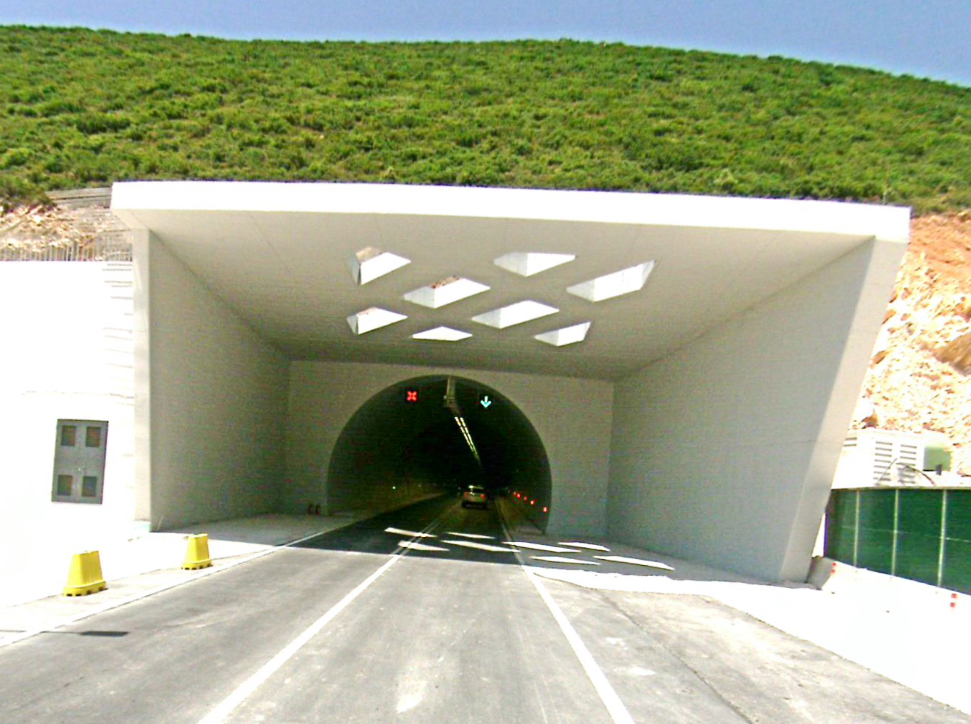
- The south entrance of Llogara Tunnel
- Interactive map of Llogara Tunnel

Overview
- Location: Albania
- Coordinates: 40°12′29″N 19°34′10″E
- Status: In use
- Route: SH8
- Start: Dukat (north)
- End: Palasë (south)

Operation
- Work began: 14 November 2021
- Opened: 5 July 2024
- Owner: Albania
- Operator: Albanian Road Authority
- Traffic: Automotive
- Toll: Motorcycles 100 lek; Cars 250 lek; Cars with trailer 500 lek; Medium vehicles 1 000 lek; Heavy vehicles 5 000 lek

Technical
- Length: 5.9 kilometres (5,900 m)
- No. of lanes: 2
- Operating speed: 60 km/h (37 mph)
- Max elevation: 1,000 m (3,300 ft)
- Min elevation: 400 m (1,300 ft)

The Llogara Tunnel is a tunnel located in the south of Albania about 20 km from Vlora. The tunnel that cuts through the Llogara National Park, has a length of 6 kilometers and is the longest in the country. It is expected to significantly improve travel times between the Albanian Riviera and other parts of the country.

In 2025, SPAK presented Belinda Balluku and other officials with charges of corruption and procurement manipulation for the Llogara Tunel project.

== Overview ==
The Llogara Tunnel, an important infrastructure project in southern Albania, aims to improve connections and facilitate transportation between Vlora and the Albanian Riviera. With the growing tourism in this beautiful area, the need for road improvements became clear. While the SH8 road was constantly being expanded, the Llogara Pass remained challenging due to its elevation of over 1,000 metres (3,300 ft) and narrow bends.

In 2017, Prime Minister Edi Rama first announced the idea of constructing a tunnel under the Llogara National Park. After a brief tender process, the planning contract was awarded to an Austrian engineering firm at the end of 2020. Less than a year later, the construction contract was awarded to a Turkish consortium, with an estimated cost of 140 million euros.

Official excavation work for the tunnel began in November 2021, and about 14 months later, in January 2023, the first tube was completed. It passes under the Llogara Pass and connects Vlora with the Albanian Riviera, offering stunning views along the way.

This 142 million euro investment includes concrete lining and complex systems for drainage, ventilation, fire and smoke protection, lighting, emergency calls, and signaling. Upon completion, the tunnel is expected to reduce the travel time from Dukat to Palasë from 30 minutes to just 7 minutes.

The Llogara Tunnel is expected to have a significant impact on the country's economy and contribute to the development of tourism along the Albanian coast. With its opening for traffic on July 5, 2024, the tunnel will facilitate travel and provide a new experience for all who visit this area.

== Investigation on favoritism in procurement procedures ==
In 2025, the Special Structure Against Corruption and Organized Crime (SPAK) announced investigations into the Llogara Tunnel project and presented charges of corruption for Belinda Balluku (in her capacity as Minister of Infrastructure), and several other officials. The investigation relates to procedures from 2020-2021 and involves violations of equality and manipulation of public procurement procedures, and favoritism towards specific economic operators.

== See also ==
- Albanian Riviera
- Vlora-Otranto Tunnel
- Thirrë-Kalimash Tunnel
