= Kalimash =

- Village
- Location within Albania
- Coordinates: 42°5′N 20°18′E
- Country: Albania
- County: Kukës
- Municipality: Kukës
- Administrative unit: Malzi
- Time zone: UTC+1 (CET)
  - Summer (DST): UTC+2 (CEST)

Kalimash (Albanian pronunciation: [kali'maʃ]; Albanian definite form: Kalimashi) is a village in the former municipality of Malzi in Kukës County, Albania. At the 2015 local government reform it became part of the municipality Kukës. There are several chromium mines near the village.
