= ISO 3166-2:AL =

Entry for Albania in ISO 3166-2

ISO 3166-2:AL is the entry for Albania in ISO 3166-2, part of the ISO 3166 standard published by the International Organization for Standardization (ISO), which defines codes for the names of the principal subdivisions (e.g., provinces or states) of all countries coded in ISO 3166-1.

Currently for Albania, ISO 3166-2 codes are defined for 12 counties.

Each code consists of two parts, separated by a hyphen. The first part is AL, the ISO 3166-1 alpha-2 code of Albania. The second part is two digits.

The codes for the counties are assigned in Albanian alphabetical order, except Dibër, whose code is assigned based on its capital, Peshkopi.

== Current codes ==
Subdivision names are listed as in the ISO 3166-2 standard published by the ISO 3166 Maintenance Agency.

Subdivision names are sorted in Albanian alphabetical order: a-c, ç, d, dh, e, ë, f-g, gj, h-l, ll, m-n, nj, o-r, rr, s, sh, t, th, u-x, xh, y-z, zh.

Click on the button in the header to sort each column.

Code	Subdivision name (sq)
AL-01	Berat
AL-09	Dibër
AL-02	Durrës
AL-03	Elbasan
AL-04	Fier
AL-05	Gjirokastër
AL-06	Korçë
AL-07	Kukës
AL-08	Lezhë
AL-10	Shkodër
AL-11	Tiranë
AL-12	Vlorë

== Changes ==
The following changes to the entry have been announced in newsletters by the ISO 3166/MA since the first publication of ISO 3166-2 in 1998. ISO stopped issuing newsletters in 2013.

Newsletter	Date issued	Description of change in newsletter	Code/Subdivision change
Newsletter I-2	2002-05-21	Introduction of 12 prefectures with their code elements. One district name and its code element changed. One district name corrected. Attribution of the prefecture code element to each district	Subdivisions added: 12 prefectures (now called counties); Codes: AL-LA Laç → AL-KB Kurbin
Newsletter I-6	2004-03-08	Change of generic term for administrative divisions. New list source	
Newsletter II-1	2010-02-03 (corrected 2010-02-19)	Addition of the country code prefix as the first code element	Codes: format changed (leading digit 0 added)

The following changes to the entry are listed on ISO's online catalogue, the Online Browsing Platform:

Effective date of change	Short description of change (en)
2015-11-27	Change of subdivision category from préfecture to comté in French; deletion of all districts; update List Source
2014-04-03	Separation of the variant local short names by semi-colon
2010-02-19	Addition of the country code prefix as the first code element

=== District codes ===
Before 27 November 2015, codes for the 36 districts of Albania were included. The code for Kolonjë (AL-ER) was assigned based on its capital, Ersekë.

Former code	Subdivision name (sq)	In county
AL-BR	Berat	01
AL-BU	Bulqizë	09
AL-DL	Delvinë	12
AL-DV	Devoll	06
AL-DI	Dibër	09
AL-DR	Durrës	02
AL-EL	Elbasan	03
AL-FR	Fier	04
AL-GR	Gramsh	03
AL-GJ	Gjirokastër	05
AL-HA	Has	07
AL-KA	Kavajë	11
AL-ER	Kolonjë	06
AL-KO	Korçë	06
AL-KR	Krujë	02
AL-KC	Kuçovë	01
AL-KU	Kukës	07
AL-KB	Kurbin	08
AL-LE	Lezhë	08
AL-LB	Librazhd	03
AL-LU	Lushnjë	04
AL-MM	Malësi e Madhe	10
AL-MK	Mallakastër	04
AL-MT	Mat	09
AL-MR	Mirditë	08
AL-PQ	Peqin	03
AL-PR	Përmet	05
AL-PG	Pogradec	06
AL-PU	Pukë	10
AL-SR	Sarandë	12
AL-SK	Skrapar	01
AL-SH	Shkodër	10
AL-TE	Tepelenë	05
AL-TR	Tiranë	11
AL-TP	Tropojë	07
AL-VL	Vlorë	12

== See also ==
- Subdivisions of Albania
- FIPS region codes of Albania
- Neighbouring countries: GR, ME, MK, RS (XK)
