= Vehicle registration plates of Albania =

Republic of Albania/Republika e Shqipërisë
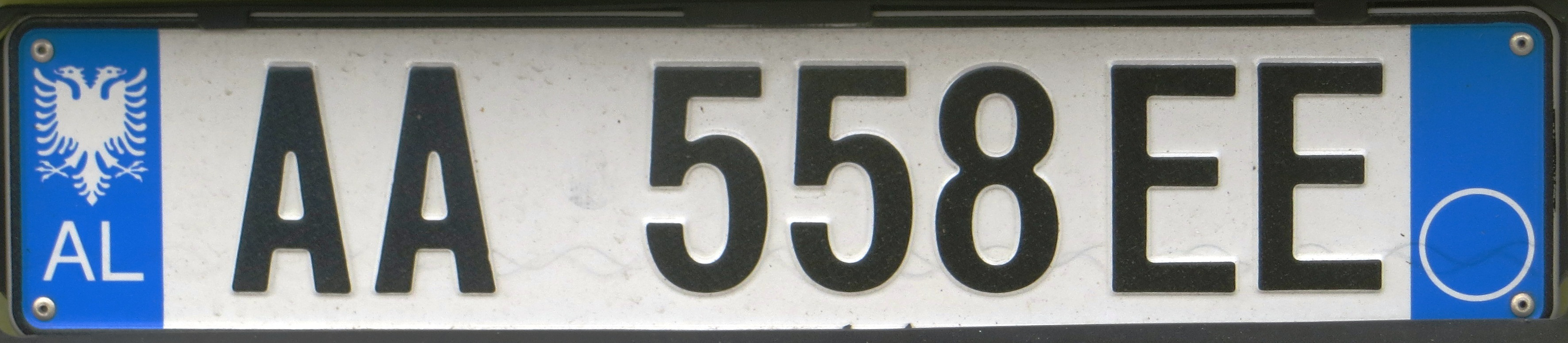
- Current plates from 2011.
- Country: Albania
- Country code: AL

Current series
- Size: 520 mm × 110 mm 20.5 in × 4.3 in
- Serial format: AB 123 CD
- Colour (front): Black on white
- Colour (rear): Black on white

In Albania, vehicle registration plates are issued by the General Directory of Road Transport Services (Albanian: Drejtoria e Përgjithshme e Shërbimeve Të Transportit Rrugor, DPSHTRR).

== Current series ==
=== Private Vehicles ===
The new format is no longer based on regional district abbreviations, while old plates are still valid

A new format similar to the post-1994 Italian and post-2009 French plate designs has been introduced since 16 February 2011. The plates start with a blue strip at the left with 'AL' and redesigned double-headed eagle in white, 2 serial letters, security hologram, 3 digits, 2 serial letters on a rectangular white background, and end on the right with a blue strip that's supposed to show year of registration and regional code in white on. It has been observed that the last two identification elements are de facto not included while the font is more emphasized than the post-2002 one. Plates of all vehicles would experience a similar change. Critics claim that the color of the double headed eagle and strip is not representative of red and black colors of the Albanian flag.

Private vehicle license plates have black borders and black texts on a white background. They follow a format [AB 123 FG]. This format is national, irrespective of the vehicle's registered district.

Standard sized License Plate, 520 x 110 mm

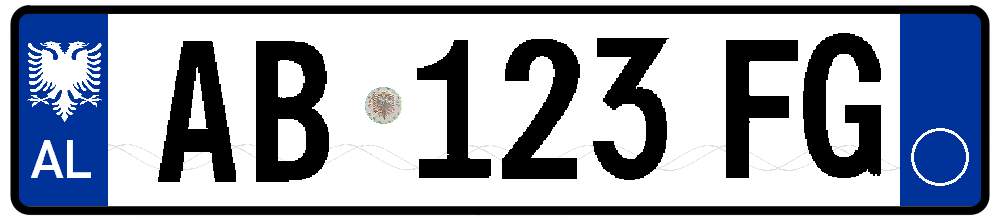

2-Lined License Plate, 254 x 205 mm

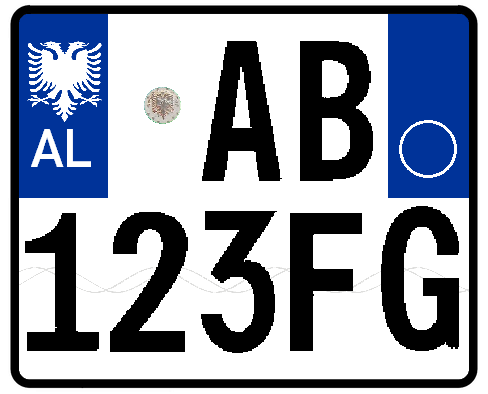

Starting in 2022, license plates may also be issued in a smaller 360 x 100 mm format for the front and a 305 x 153 mm format for both front and rear plates. These are issued due to an increase of imports from Italy, Switzerland and the United States, which do not always issue EU-standard plates.

In Albania, "repetitive" license plates have red borders and texts on a white background. These are additional license plates to install, if there's an object such as a bike carrier rack blocking the original license plate of a private vehicle.

Standard sized License Plate, 520 x 110 mm

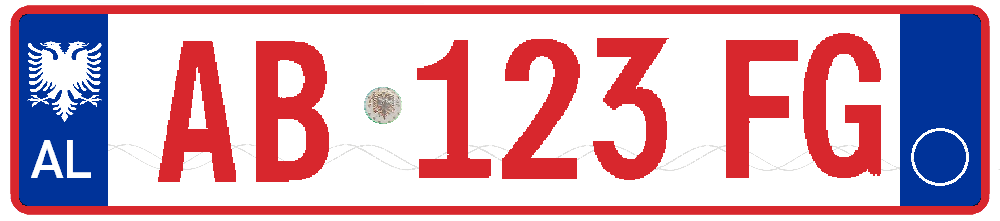

2-Lined License Plate, 254 x 205 mm

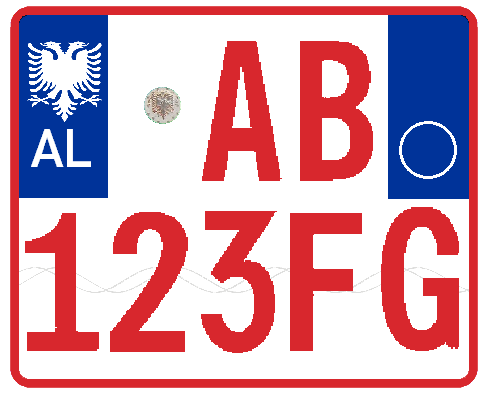

=== Agricultural vehicles ===
Agricultural vehicle registration plates in Albania have white borders and white texts on a green background. They follow the format [AA MB 00], where MB stands for Makinë Bujqësore which means Agricultural Vehicle.

Standard sized License Plate, 520 x 110 mm

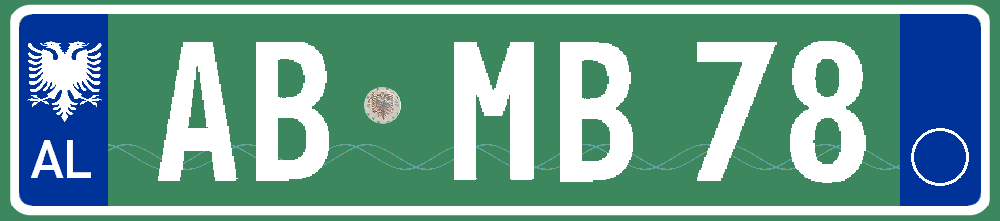

2-Lined License Plate, 254 x 205 mm

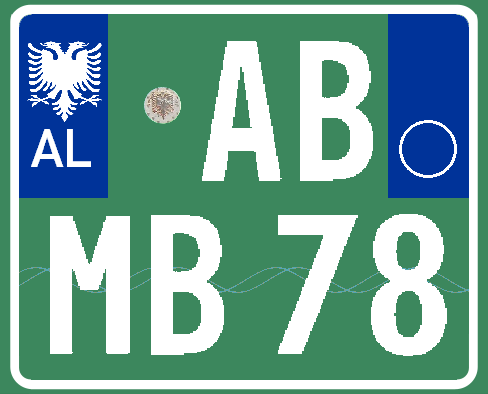

Agricultural trailer registration plates in Albania have white borders and white texts on a green background. They follow the format [AA RB 00], where RB stands for Rimorkio Bujqësore which means Agricultural trailer.

Standard sized License Plate, 520 x 110 mm

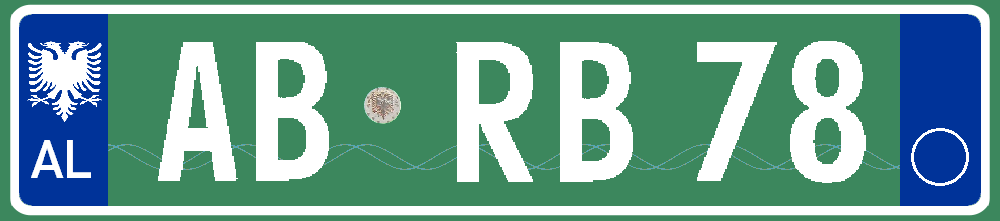

2-Lined License Plate, 254 x 205 mm

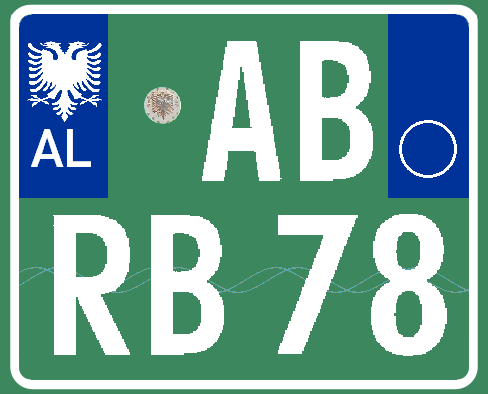

=== Diplomatic Corps ===
Diplomatic corps vehicle registration plates in Albania have green borders and green texts on a white background. They do not have the blue strip on the right hand-side of the plate, unlike private vehicle registration plates. They follow the format [CD 00 00A], where CD stands for Corps Diplomatique. The first 2 digits of the license plate refer to the Diplomatic license plate codes (explained later in the article). For example, code 01 belongs to the diplomatic corps of Austria whereas code 41 refers to the diplomatic corps of the European Union. Plate 01A belongs to the highest-ranking member of staff (usually the Ambassador) whereas all other plates are issued sequentially.

Standard sized License Plate, 520 x 110 mm

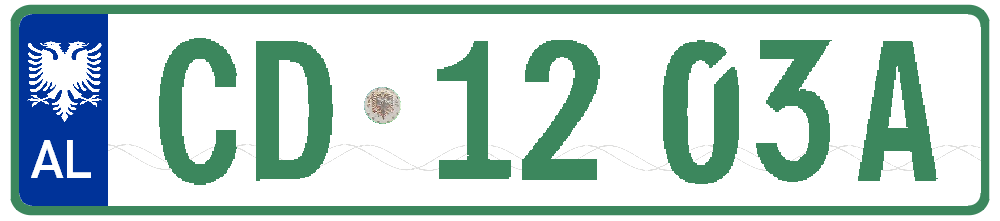

2-Lined License Plate, 254 x 205 mm

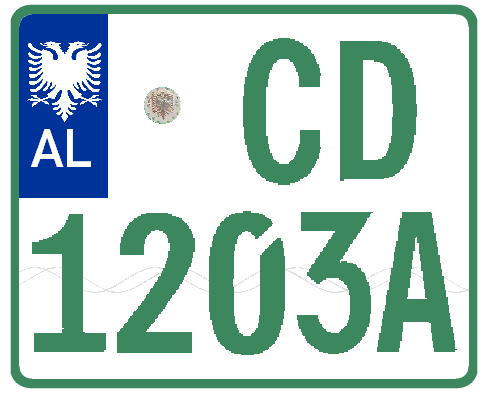

Diplomatic service vehicle registration plates in Albania have green borders and green texts on a white background. They do not have the blue strip on the right hand-side of the plate, unlike private vehicle registration plates. They follow the format [TR 00 00A], where TR stands for Truproje Diplomatike, which means "Diplomatic Bodyguards" in Albanian. The first 2 digits of the license plate refer to the Diplomatic license plate codes.

Standard sized License Plate, 520 x 110 mm

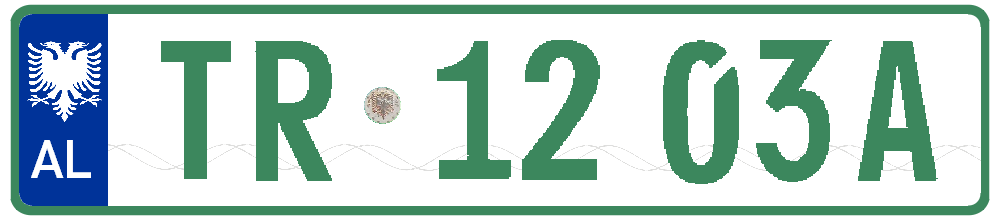

2-Lined License Plate, 254 x 205 mm

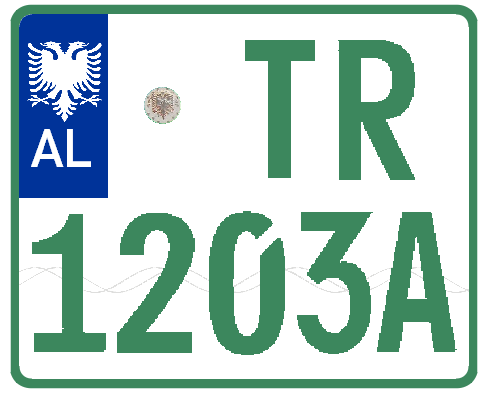

Honorary consul vehicle registration plates in Albania have green borders and green texts on a white background. They do not have the blue strip on the right hand-side of the plate, unlike private vehicle registration plates. They follow the format [HCC 00 0A], where HCC stands for Honorary Consul Corps. The first 2 digits of the license plate refer to the Diplomatic license plate codes.

=== Military vehicles ===
Military vehicle registration plates in Albania have green borders and green texts on a white background. They follow the format [MM 000PU], where MM stands for Ministria e Mbrojtjes which means Ministry of Defense. The last two digits can be the following combinations:

- FA (Forca Ajrore, Air Force)
- FD (Forca Detare, Naval Force)
- FT (Forca Tokësore, Land Force)
- KM (Komanda Mbështetëse, Support Command)
- PU (Policia Ushtarake, Military Police)
- SP (Shtabi i Përgjithshëm, General Staff)

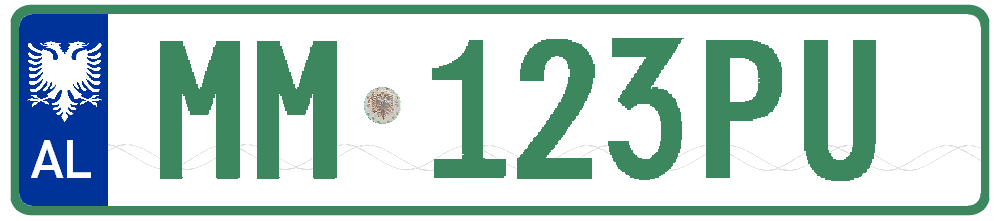

2-Lined License Plate, 254 x 205 mm

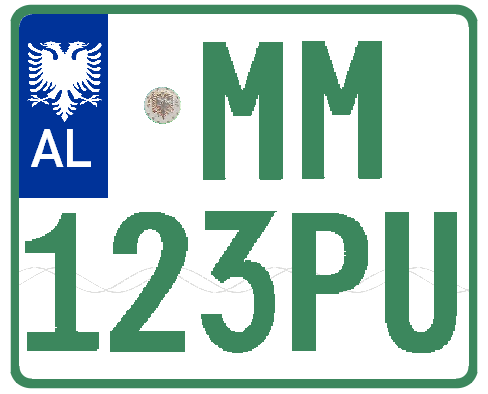

=== Police vehicles ===
Albanian Police vehicle registration plates in Albania have blue borders and blue texts on a white background. They follow the format [MB 000 AA], where MB stands for Ministria e Brendshme which means Ministry of Interior. These plates are also issued to other subjects under the Ministry of the Interior, including the Republican Guard, which arranges transport for high-ranking members of state.

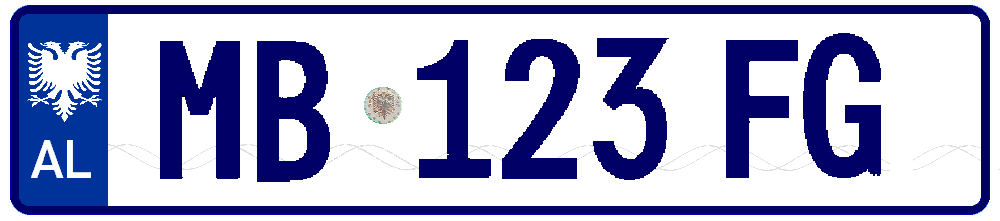

2-Lined License Plate, 254 x 205 mm

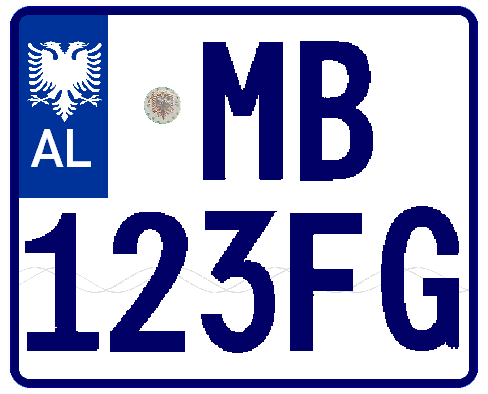

=== Taxis ===
Taxi registration plates in Albania have red borders and red texts on a yellow background. They follow the format [AA 000 T], where T stands for Taxi.

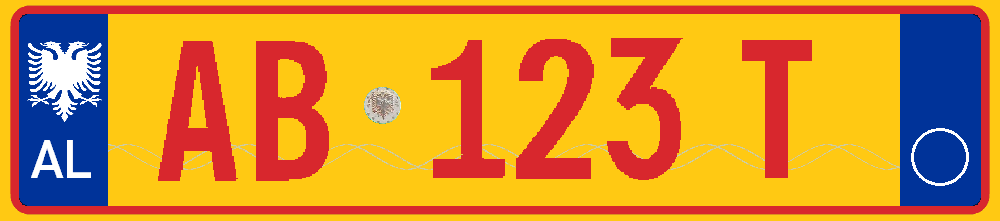

2-Lined License Plate, 254 x 205 mm

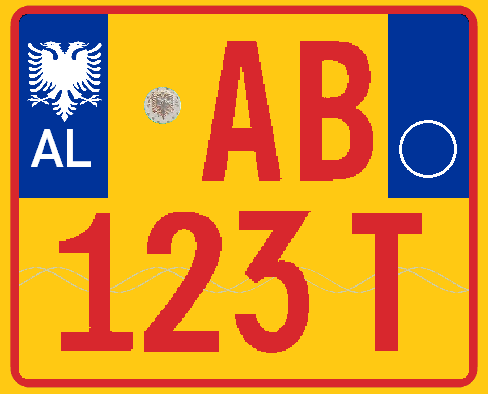

=== Technological Vehicles ===
Technological Vehicle registration plates in Albania have white borders and white texts on a green background. They follow the format [AA MT 00], where MT stands for Makinë Teknologjike which means Technological Vehicle.

Standard sized License Plate, 520 x 110 mm

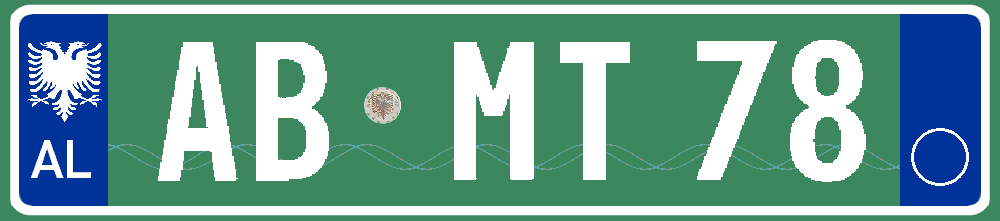

2-Lined License Plate, 254 x 205 mm

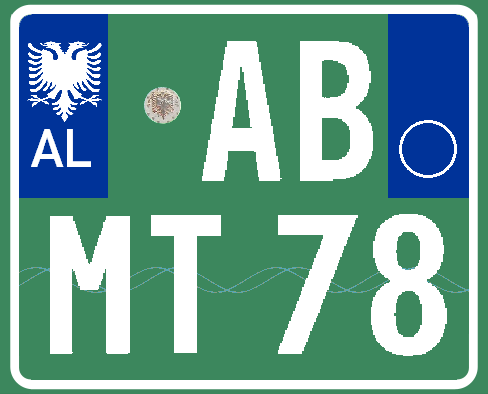

Technological trailer registration plates in Albania have white borders and white texts on a green background. They follow the format [AA RT 00], where RT stands for Rimorkio Teknologjike which means Technological trailer.

Standard sized License Plate, 520 x 110 mm

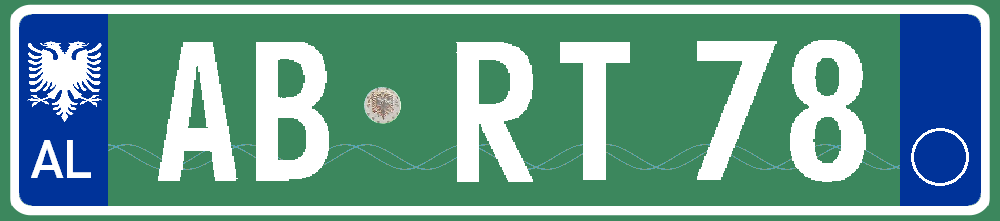

2-Lined License Plate, 254 x 205 mm

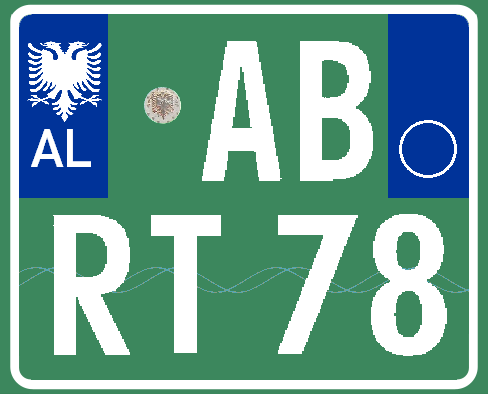

=== Trailers ===
Trailer registration plates in Albania have white borders and white texts on a green background. They follow the format [AA R 000], where R stands for Rimorkio which means Trailer.

Standard sized License Plate, 520 x 110 mm

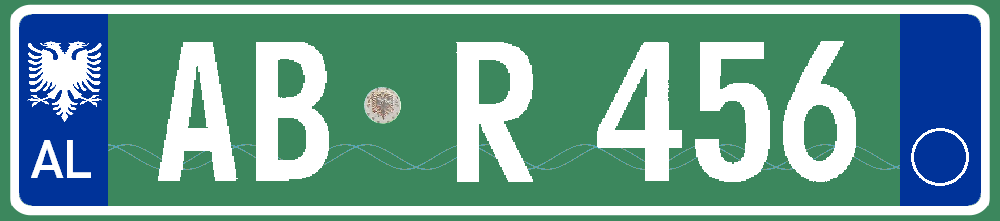

2-Lined License Plate, 254 x 205 mm

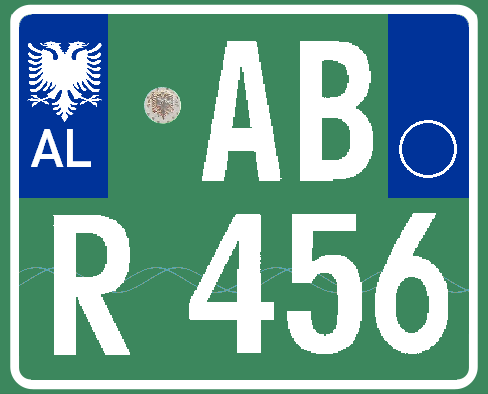

=== Test and Temporary Plates ===
Test Vehicle registration plates in Albania have red borders and red texts on a white background. They follow the format [AA 0 PROV], where PROV stands for Provë which means Test.

Standard sized License Plate, 520 x 110 mm

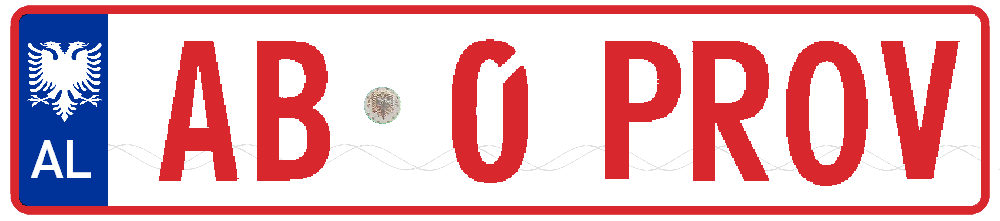

2-Lined License Plate, 254 x 205 mm

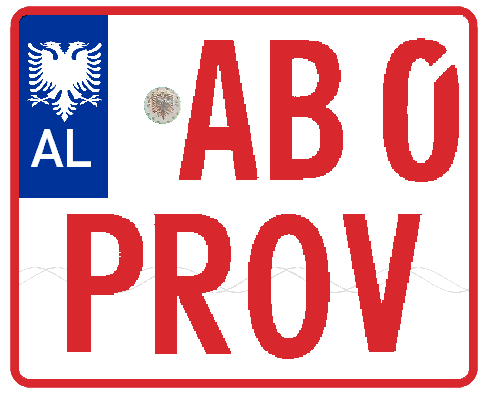

Temporary Vehicle registration plates in Albania have red borders and red texts on a white background. They follow the format [AA 0 PRK], where PRK stands for Përkohshme which means Temporary. Standard sized License Plate, 520 x 110 mm

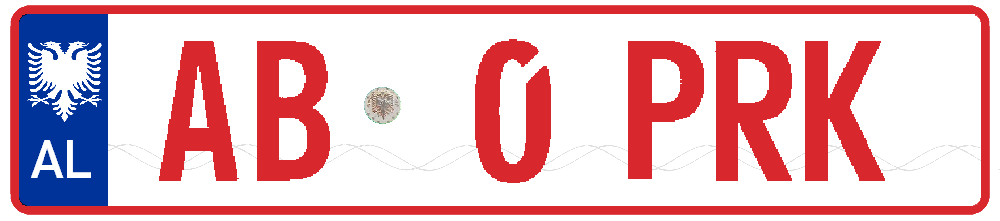

2-Lined License Plate, 254 x 205 mm

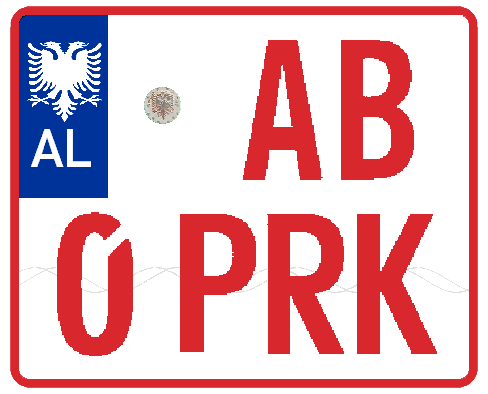

=== Motorcycles ===
Private motorcycles in Albania have a license plate format [AA 000]. Motorcycle registration plate in Albania have a size of 212 mm by 205 mm or 177 mm by 177 mm, and have black text and black boundaries on a white background.

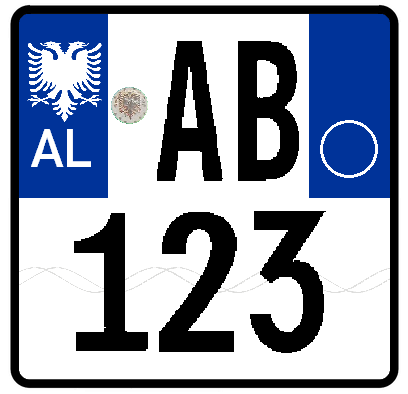

== Font Style ==
Albanian uses a unique font style on its license plates, a font style not used in any other jurisdiction. Below is a list of all characters and numbers in this font style

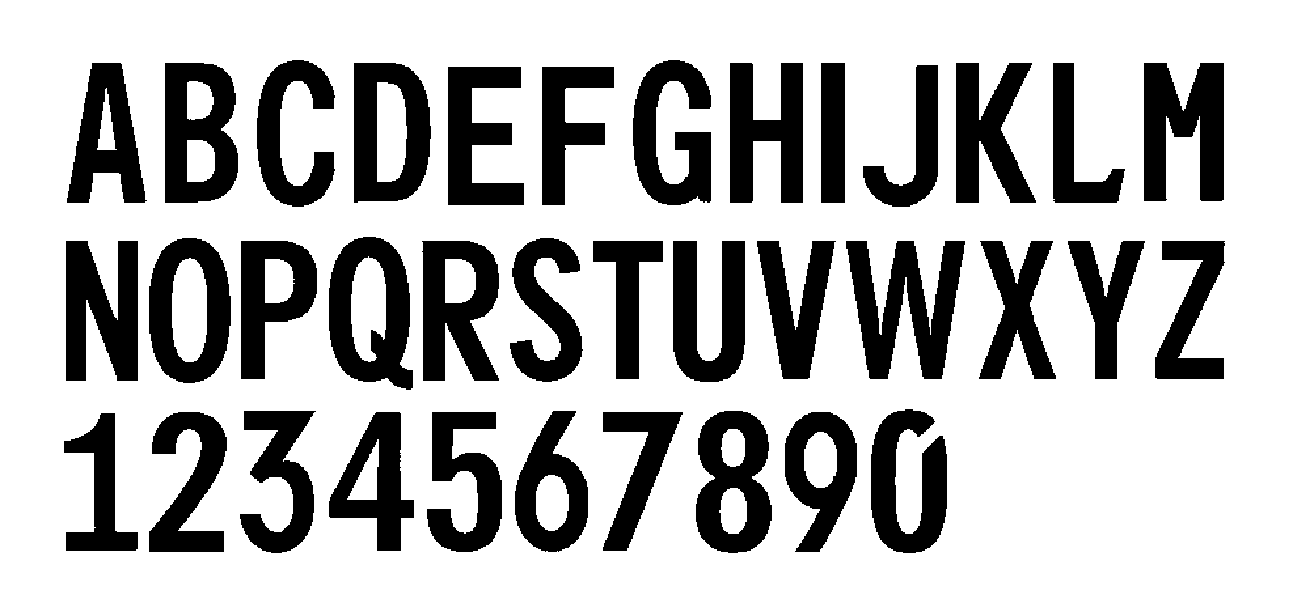

== History ==
=== 1958–1993 ===
During communism, plates of trucks would be painted upon on the sides with district name initials and a five digit serial number (in 1991 two digits followed with district name initials and three digits). State vehicles bore a white plate with the communist red star, district initials and serial number in black or white. Once private ownership was re-established after the fall of communism, a new format with standard size was introduced similar to the post 1993 model but with different font and missing national identification strip.

=== 1993–2011 ===
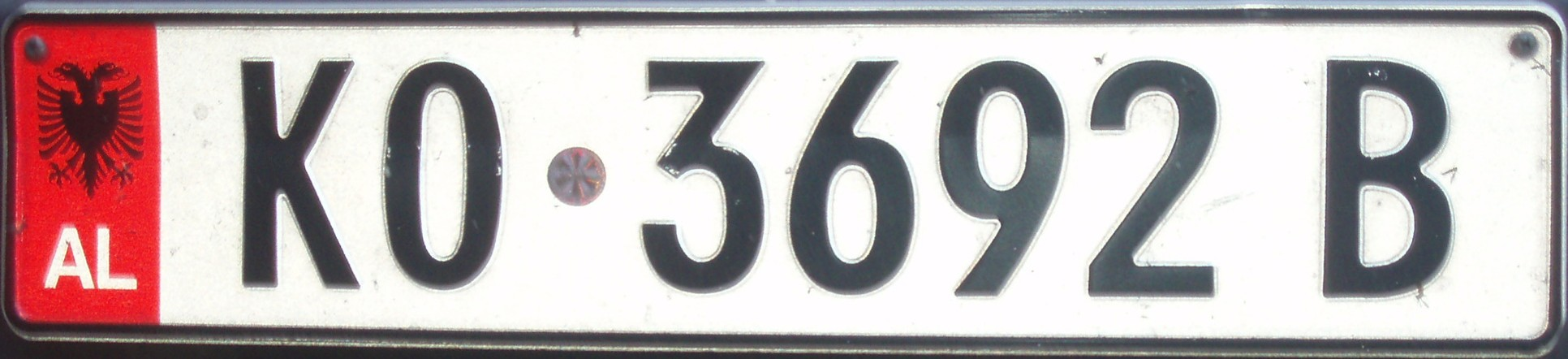
Plate with smaller font and regional code issued from 2002 to 2011. 'KO' stands for Korçë District. Old plates are still valid even though new plates were introduced

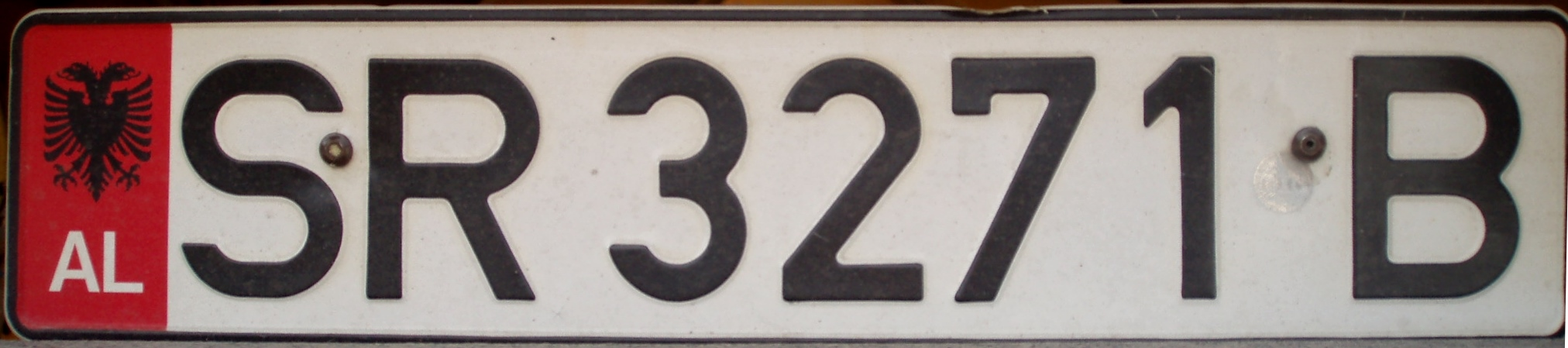
Plate with DIN 1451 font issued from 1995 to 2002. 'SR' stands for Sarandë District. Note the inclusion of the national identification strip on the left

The old 1993 format is still valid even though the new 2011 plates were introduced in April 2011. The old 1993 format was introduced around 1993 with the addition of the national identification strip (in 1995) on the left and a new bigger DIN 1451 font. Spacing between characters changed numerous times and a security hologram was added. The format starts with a two-letter abbreviation of an Albanian district name. For instance, the abbreviation for Korçë District is KO. A four-digit number follows with a serial letter indicating the order of allocation of each series of numbers. Thus, a plate ending in "B" will have been more recently released than one ending in "A" in the same district. Since 2002, a smaller font was introduced while plates with the older font are still valid.

The numbers and letters running on a Latin alphabet system show the number of vehicles registered in a district. If the last letter of a plate is "U", it means that a particular district has ~200 000 (two hundred thousand) registered cars.

=== District abbreviations ===
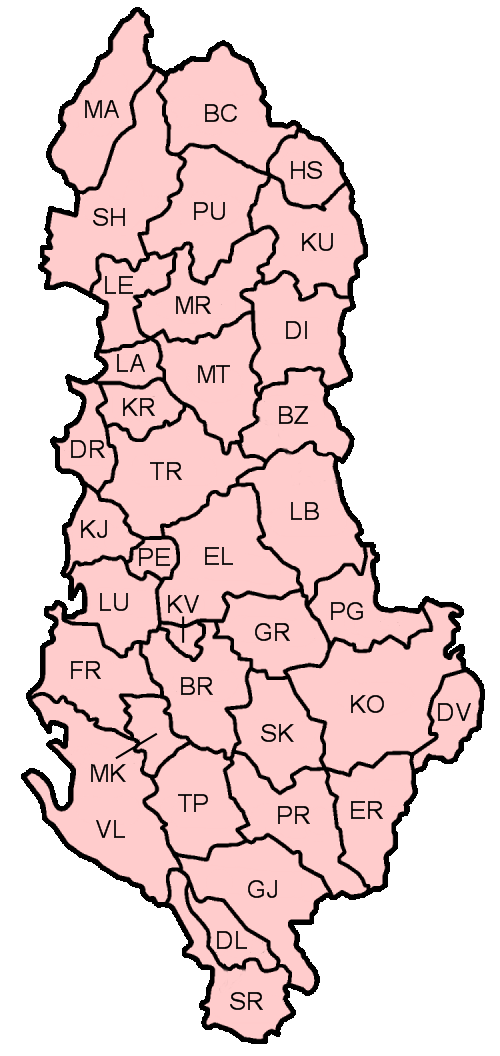
Map of regional codes

| Code | District |
|---|---|
| BC | Tropojë |
| BR | Berat |
| BZ | Bulqizë |
| DI | Dibër |
| DL | Delvinë |
| DR | Durrës |
| DV | Devoll |
| EL | Elbasan |
| ER | Kolonjë |
| FR | Fier |
| GJ | Gjirokastër |
| GR | Gramsh |
| HS | Has |
| KJ | Kavajë |
| KO | Korçë |
| KR | Krujë |
| KU | Kukës |
| KV | Kuçovë |
| LA | Kurbin |
| LB | Librazhd |
| LE | Lezhë |
| LU | Lushnjë |
| MA | Malësi e Madhe |
| MK | Mallakastër |
| MR | Mirditë |
| MT | Mat |
| PE | Peqin |
| PG | Pogradec |
| PR | Përmet |
| PU | Pukë |
| SH | Shkodër |
| SK | Skrapar |
| SR | Sarandë |
| TP | Tepelenë |
| TR | Tirana |
| VL | Vlorë |

== Diplomatic license plate codes ==
| Code | Country or Organization |
|---|---|
| 01 | Austria |
| 02 | United Kingdom |
| 03 | Bulgaria |
| 04 | Bosnia and Herzegovina |
| 05 | Czech Republic |
| 06 | Egypt |
| 07 | France |
| 08 | Greece |
| 09 | Germany |
| 10 | Hungary |
| 11 | Italy |
| 12 | Iran |
| 13 | Serbia |
| 14 | China |
| 15 | Croatia |
| 16 | Libya |
| 17 | North Macedonia |
| 18 | Palestine |
| 19 | Poland |
| 20 | Romania (Honorary Consulate) |
| 21 | Russia |
| 22 | Vatican |
| 23 | United States |
| 24 | Turkey |
| 25 | Switzerland |
| 26 | Slovenia |
| 27 | Saudi Arabia |
| 28 | Sweden |
| 29 | Spain |
| 31 | ? |
| 33 | UNESCO |
| 38 | former Western European Union |
| 40 | EBRD |
| 41 | European Union |
| 42 | United Nations |
| 43 | UNICEF |
| 44 | UNHCR |
| 45 | WHO (World Health Organisation) |
| 46 | FAO (Food and Agriculture Organization) |
| 47 | IMF |
| 48 | World Bank |
| 49 | International Organization for Migration |
| 51 | UNOPS (United Nations Office for Project Services) |
| 52 | Kuwait |
| 53 | ? |
| 54 | ? |
| 55 | Kosovo |
| 56 | Netherlands |
| 58 | S.A.M. |
| 60 | Denmark |
| 61 | Azerbaijan |
| 66 | Slovakia |
| 75 | ? |
| 77 | Brazil |
| 79 | Israel |
| 81 | Qatar |

== See also ==
- Transport in Albania
- Driving licence in Albania
