= Postal codes in Albania =

Postal Codes in Albania consist of 4 digits; the first two digits show the branch on a district level located at the center of that administrative level, whereas the second two digits show the postal office offering service to a defined administration unit on a municipality level:

- 1000 District of Tirana
- 1500 District of Krujë
- 2000 District of Durrës
- 2500 District of Kavajë
- 3000 District of Elbasan
- 3300 District of Gramsh
- 3400 District of Librazhd
- 3500 District of Peqin
- 4000 District of Shkodër
- 4300 District of Malësi e Madhe
- 4400 District of Pukë
- 4500 District of Lezhë
- 4600 District of Mirditë
- 4700 District of Kurbin
- 5000 District of Berat
- 5300 District of Kuçovë
- 5400 District of Skrapar
- 6000 District of Gjirokastër
- 6300 District of Tepelenë
- 6400 District of Përmet
- 7000 District of Korçë
- 7300 District of Pogradec
- 7400 District of Kolonjë
- 8000 District of Mat
- 8300 District of Dibër
- 8400 District of Bulqizë
- 8500 District of Kukës
- 8600 District of Has
- 8700 District of Tropojë
- 9000 District of Lushnjë
- 9300 District of Fier
- 9400 District of Vlorë
- 9700 District of Sarandë
- 1700 Transit
- 1800 EMS Office
