= Jani Vruho =

Albanian publisher and nationalist figure

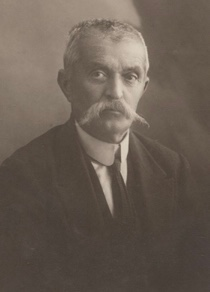
- Born: August 5, 1863; Vërtop, Berat District, Ottoman Empire (modern Albania)
- Died: September 15, 1931 (aged 68); El Faiyūm, Egypt
- Occupation: Publisher
- Known for: Rrufeja newspaper Shkopi newspaper

Jani Vruho (August 5, 1863 – September 15, 1931) was an Albanian publisher and nationalist figure.

== Life ==
Vruho was born in the Vërtop village Poliçan, Albania, then in the Ottoman Empire. When he was young he emigrated to Egypt like many other Rilindas, settling in El Faiyūm. Vruho spent most of his life and died there. He started publishing articles in the Ditërëfenjës or Kalendari Kombiar ("National Calendar") in Sofia, or Liri e Cqiperise ("Freedom of Albania"), both by Kristo Luarasi. Vruho was an untiring propagandist of the Albanian national cause. He was relatively satisfied that the national consciousness of Albanians was reaching a certain form. Vruho was also a promoter of writings in Albanian and Albanian education. He wrote in one of his articles in "Freedom of Albania", March 31, 1911: "Of all the perils which surround Albania today, we see salvation in only one thing: we read and write in the language of the people. It is when young people learn to read and write in their language that we may state with full conviction that Albania has been saved."

From 1906 to 1909, Vruho published the satirical newspaper Shkopi ("The stick") in Cairo together with Thanas Tashko that was distributed free of charge advocating for Albanian independence and also "flogged the Grecomans". It was printed in the Istanbul Alphabet (of the Istanbul Committee) aiming at "defending the rights of the Albanian nation, praising those worthy of praise, and scolding those to be scolded in the nationalistic cause". The periodical had articles in Albanian and Greek and served the Albanian community of Cairo until 1908. Back then the Albanian community of Egypt was organized in two main societies: Vëllazëria ("The brotherhood") and Bashkimi ("The union").
In 1909, Vruho published a second Albanian-language periodical called Rrufeja ("The lightning") that lasted until February 1910. Some of the prominent works of the Albanian National Awakening would be published here, including Pas vdekjes ("After the death") of 1910 by Andon Zako Çajupi. After the distribution in Albania was banned by the Young Turk government in 1910, Vruho changed the name in 1910 to Sëpata ("The axe") and continued publication for a short time after. In 1911, the Albanian community of Egypt collected financial contributions and placed Vruho in charge of purchasing weapons for Albanian insurgents in the Balkans.

== Legacy ==
Though emigrated for most of his life away from Albania, Vruho is remembered as an energetic Rilindas who contributed all his life to the Albanian national cause.
A neighborhood in Berat, previously called Vakëf, was renamed after him. Schools and publishing houses in Albania bear his name.

== See also ==
- Jani Vreto
- Sotir Kolea
- Society for the Publication of Albanian Writings
