= Zahrisht =

- Village
- Location within Albania
- Coordinates: 42°12′20″N 20°20′41″E
- Country: Albania
- County: Kukës
- Municipality: Has
- Administrative unit: Krumë
- Time zone: UTC+1 (CET)
  - Summer (DST): UTC+2 (CEST)

Zahrisht is a village in Kukës County, northeastern Albania. At the 2015 local government reform it became part of the municipality Has.
