= Kisha e Shën Kollit =

Kisha e Shën Kollit may refer to several monuments in Albania:

- Kisha e Shën Kollit (Perondi), Berat
- Kisha e Shën Kollit (Shelcan), Elbasan
