= Zhapokikë Uprising =

- Part of peasant resistance against the Communist Party of Albania
Date	28 September – 8 October 1948
Location	Zhapokikë, Communist Albania
Result	Suppression of Anti-Communist resistance

Belligerents
Baba Shefqet Detachment	Albania: Sigurimi; Albanian Police

Commanders and leaders
Bajram Kamberi; Xhemal Brahimi	Sulo Gradeci; Xhezo Makashi

Strength
30	Unknown

Casualties and losses
7 dead: 2 killed in battle; 2 executed; 2 died in jail; 1 took his life; 23 prisoners	3 killed

The Zhapokikë Uprising (Albanian: Kryengritja e Zhapokikës) was an anti-Communist uprising in southern Albania that occurred between September 28-October 8, 1948. The uprising had the objective of removing the Marxist–Leninist regime of Enver Hoxha with the desire to implement a nationalist democratic government. Ultimately the uprising was stifled by the regime.

== Background ==
Enver Hoxha and his communist partisan movement took over Albania in 1944 and for the next few years implemented radical economic and social change across the country. While the communists began to centralize power, anti-communist resistance across northern Albania continued for the next few years. While a significant number of communists came from the south, anti-communist elements in southern Albania were omnipresent as well, consisting mostly of former Balli Kombëtar members alongside dissatisfied social democrats & those persecuted by the new communist government. Additionally, increasing anti-religious persecution and the execution of Baba Shefqet, a Bektashi dervish, in January 1948 would further fuel the hostility of the rural countryside.

== The Uprising ==
On September 28, 1948, several anti-communist Albanians organized in the village of Zhapokikë which was situated near Tepelenë. This committee of anti-communist Albanians in Zhapokikë, which dubbed themselves the “Baba Shefqet Detachment” in the late dervish's honor, aspired to remove the government of Enver Hoxha and link up with other anti-communist Albanians across the region, from the village itself to other regions in Berat, Mallakastër, and even Tirana. The çeta was headed by Xhemal Brahimi & Bajram Kamberi who both served as the leaders of this armed group. Sali Kaso & Sefer Yzeiri served as the head of the assassin group of the çetë detachment.

The organization and formation of this group, made up of armed peasants, was of grave concern for the government. By 2 October 1948, the local Sigurimi branch was informed of the growing armed anti-communist activity and began to take punitive measures to stifle the uprising and hunt down the organizers of the group. The Sigurimi detachment, headed by Xhezo Makashi, began a crackdown of the region and the Black Hand çete clashed with the Sigurimi & Albanian People's Army in the village of Kamçisht. The Black Hand assassin group of the çetë captured two villagers who informed on the group's activities but later released them and escaped.

The communist regime continued to crack down on the çete until they located them in another village on 8 October 1948. In this confrontation, a shootout occurred between fighters of the Baba Shefqet Detachment & State Police leading to the death of two police officers. Xhezo Makashi, the local Sigurimi officer, was also killed in this confrontation. After the battle, the group disbanded, and over two dozen were arrested while two members, Bajram Ahmetaj, and Sefer Yzeiri (one of the leads of the Black Hand assassin group within the armed band) were killed by the state. A few other members who participated in the anti-communist uprising hid or resisted individually for months thereafter.

== Aftermath ==
Many of the members who participated in the uprising were sentenced to hard labor by the communist regime and were subsequently persecuted. In total 7 members of the Baba Shefqet Detachment were killed; 2 were killed in the 8 October confrontation, 2 were shot by People's Police officers, 2 more died after their guilty verdicts in the Tepelena Prison, and 1 allegedly committed suicide.

Many folk songs and laments for the uprising in post-communist Albania are sung by the locals who commentate the bravery of the men who stood against totalitarianism. Such hymns and short poems that existed included one sung by the men that goes as follows:

Ejani o popull, mblidhuni me ne!

O Baba Tomorri, lësho ne rrufe!

Armët ne i kemi, fshehur nene dhe

Do të bëjmë luftë, flakë e batare
