= 7400 =

7400 may refer to:

== Years ==
- A.D. 7400, a year in the 8th millennium CE
- 7400 BCE, a year in the 8th millennium BC

== Electronics and computing ==
- Texas Instruments 7400-series integrated circuits
- PowerPC 7400 CPU chip
- MITS 7400 scientific and engineering calculator

== Other uses ==
- 7400 Lenau, an asteroid in the Asteroid Belt, the 7400th asteroid registered
- 7400 (District of Kolonjë), one of the postal codes in Albania
- GWR 7400 Class locomotives

== See also ==
- List of 7400-series integrated circuits
