= Ali Asllani =

Albanian politician, writer and activist involved in the Albanian National Awakening

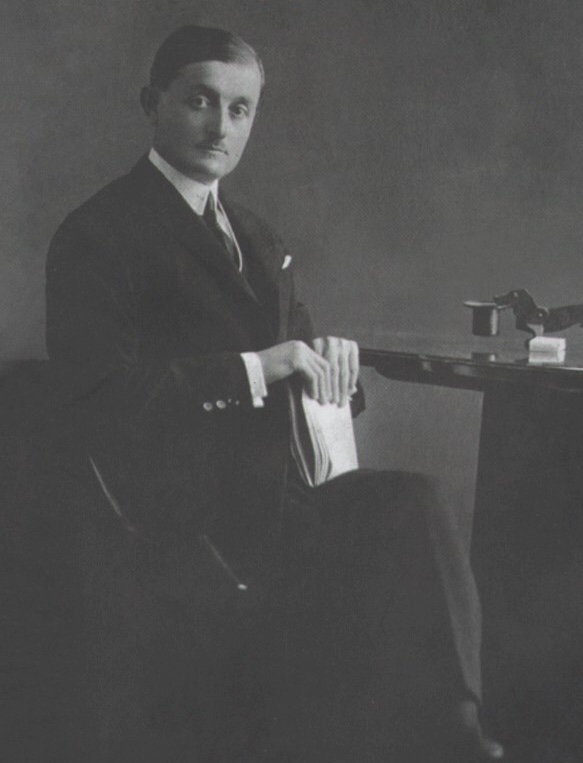
- Asllani, 1920s
- Born: November 28, 1884; Vajza, Vlorë District,
- Died: December 20, 1966 (aged 82); Tirana, Albania
- Occupations: Poet, politician
- Known for: being an activist of the Albanian National Awakening

Ali Asllani (28 November 1884 in Vajza, Vlorë District – 20 December 1966 in Tirana, Albania) was an Albanian poet, politician and activist of the Albanian National Awakening.

== Biography ==
Asllani was born in village Vajza, Vlorë District, Ottoman Albania, in present-day Kotë, Selenicë municipality. He was educated in Ioannina (Zosimaia School) and Istanbul and started working as public servant in the Ottoman administration. He is remembered for his song Hanko Halla (English: Aunt Jane). He collaborated with Ismail Kemal and his Provisional Government. In 1930s he represented Albania as consul in Greece and Bulgaria.

== Selected works ==
- Hanko Halla: poemë, Biblioteka e Traditës: Antikuar, "Naim Frashëri", 1999
