= Has District =

Defunct administrative region in Albania

Has District Rrethi i Hasit
- Former district
- Coordinates: 42°11′N 20°23′E
- Country: Albania
- Dissolved: 2000
- Seat: Krumë

Area
  - Total: 374 km^{2} (144 sq mi)

Population (2001)
  - Total: 19,842
  - Density: 53.1/km^{2} (137/sq mi)
- Time zone: UTC+1 (CET)
  - Summer (DST): UTC+2 (CEST)

Has District (Albanian: Rrethi i Hasit) was one of the 36 districts of Albania, which were dissolved in July 2000 and replaced by 12 counties. It had a population of 19,842 in 2001, and an area of 374 km^{2} (144 sq mi). It is in the north-east of the country, and its capital was Krumë. The area of the former district is coextensive with the present municipality of Has, which is part of Kukës County.

Has District, besides the town of Krumë, comprised a number of villages, with the entire area taking in about 78,000 refugees during the 1998–99 Kosovo War. Has is located in the border of Albania and Kosovo. The ethnographic region of Has is much wider than Has District, as the region extends beyond the Albania-Kosovo border to the gates of the Kosovo cities of Prizren and Gjakova.

== Administrative divisions ==
The district consisted of the following municipalities:

- Fajzë
- Gjinaj
- Golaj
- Krumë

== See also ==
- Has of Prizren, region in Kosovo

== Notes and references ==
References:
