= Albania–Yugoslav border incident (April 1999) =

- Part of the Kosovo War and Battle of Košare
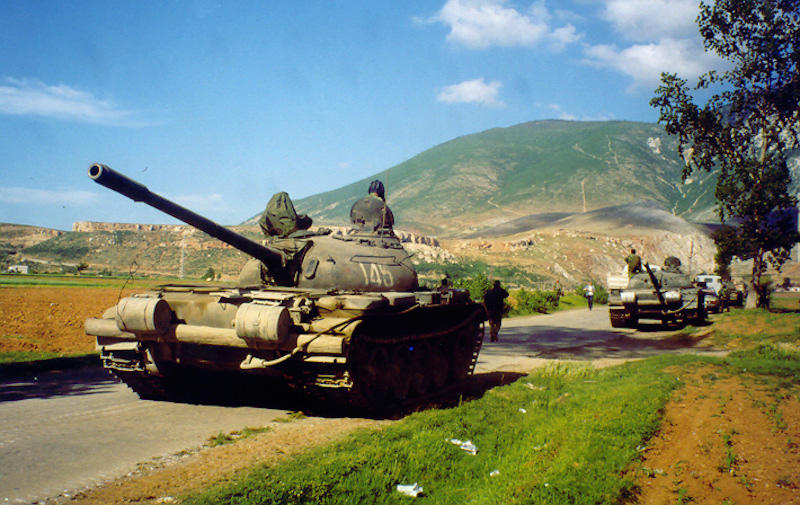
- Albanian Type 59 tanks at the border a few weeks after the incident.
Date	13 April 1999
Location	Krumë, Kukës, Tropojë and surrounding villages
Result	Status quo ante bellum: Yugoslav forces retreat to Yugoslavia; Albania breaks diplomatic relations with Yugoslavia

Belligerents
Yugoslavia	Albania; Kosovo Liberation Army

Commanders and leaders
Dragan Živanović	Kudusi Lama

Units involved
Yugoslav Army: 53rd Border Battalion; 63rd Parachute Brigade	Albanian Army: Kukës Division; Kosovo Liberation Army

Strength
(Serbia and Montenegro) 50 soldiers of 63rd Paratroop Battalion	Kukës division Type 59 Tanks Unknown

Casualties and losses
(Serbia and Montenegro) None	None; None

An incident took place on the Albania–Yugoslav border in April 1999 when the Yugoslav Army shelled several Albanian border towns around Krumë, Tropojë. In these villages, refugees were being housed after fleeing the ongoing war in Kosovo by crossing into Albania. On 13 April 1999, Yugoslav infantry entered Albanian territory to close off an area that was used by the Kosovo Liberation Army to stage attacks against Yugoslav targets.

== Background ==
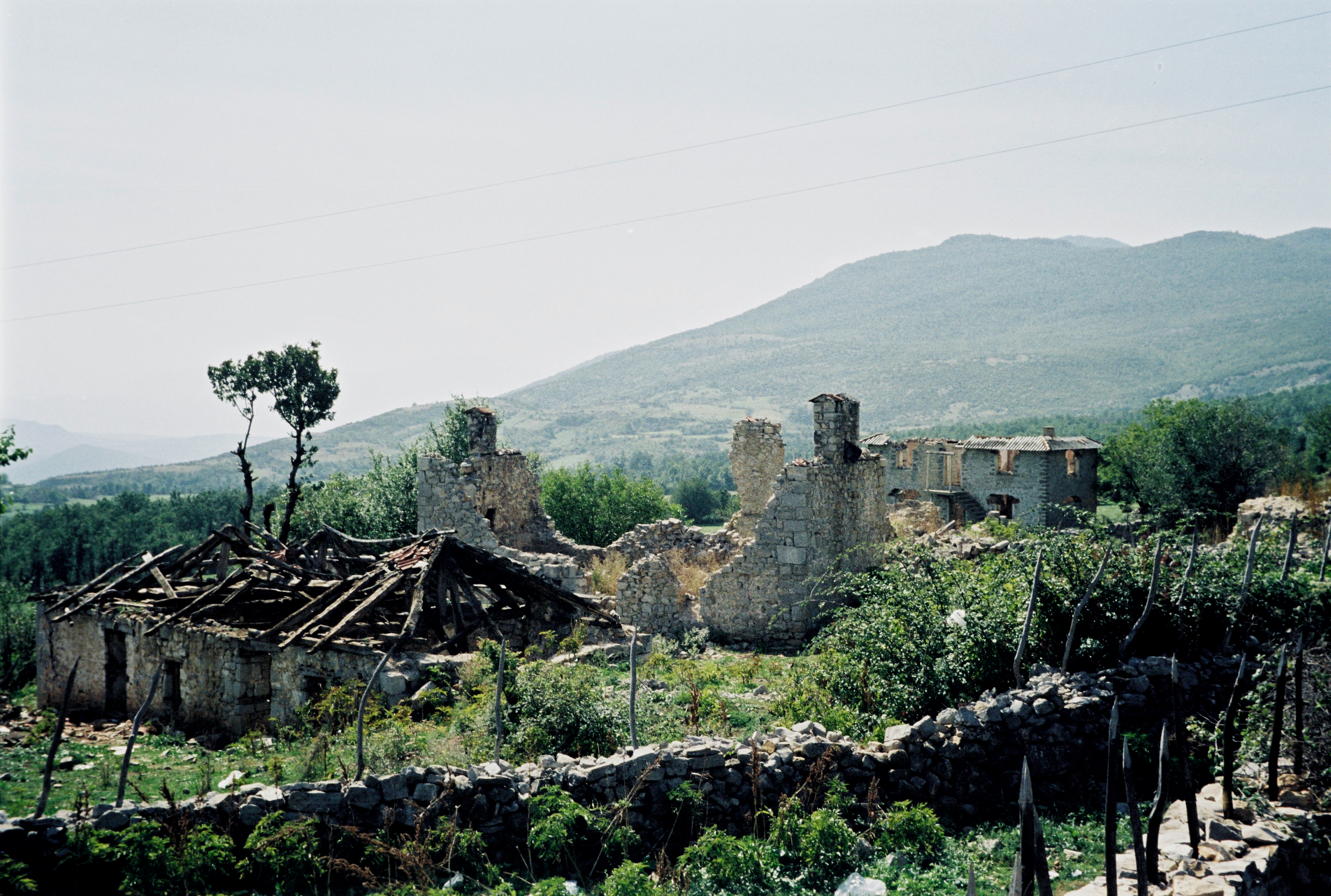
Ruins near Morinë in the White Drin valley, at the Albanian border

In 1992–1993, ethnic Albanians created the Kosovo Liberation Army (KLA) which started attacking Federal Republic of Yugoslavia (FRY) police forces and secret-service officials who abused Albanian civilians in 1995. Starting in 1998, the KLA was involved in frontal battle, with increasing numbers of Yugoslav security forces. Escalating tensions led to the Kosovo War in February 1998.

As tensions increased, it became increasingly difficult for the Albanian Army to monitor the country's 140-kilometre (87 mi) border with the FRY and cope with the steady influx of Kosovar Albanian refugees into the country. Yugoslav army units controlled the border in a few areas, but generally relied on the remote mountainous terrain to do their work for them. Many Yugoslav border units suffered from lack of manpower, with the wars in Bosnia and Herzegovina and Croatia having seriously damaged their resources. The morale of soldiers was low, with food often poor, and spare parts for army and police equipment and supplies were difficult to obtain.

Albanian authorities were concerned with attempts by Serbia to implicate Albania as a supporter of terrorism. The Albanian Army had an estimated 4,000–6,000 soldiers, and Yugoslavia was said to have "little regard" for the country's military.

The Kosovo War caused thousands of Kosovar Albanians to join the KLA ranks. More than 500,000 ethnic Albanian refugees fled their homes in fear of Yugoslav Army reprisals between 1998 and 1999. Meanwhile, the KLA began to recruit in the refugee camps. There had been fighting along the border between the KLA and Yugoslav forces where KLA troops had infiltrated into Kosovo. The subsequent incursion by the FRY could have been in response to KLA actions in the area, according to Albanian police.

Relations between the FRY and Albania had been strained as 300,000 ethnic Albanians had fled into Albania itself. The Yugoslavs had been angered over Albania's support of NATO airstrikes and its sheltering of KLA militants. The Organization for Security and Co-operation in Europe (OSCE) had reported previous Yugoslav Army incursions into Albanian territory. The border was lightly defended by the Albanian Army which was ordered not to fire back after a Yugoslav Army attack. A KLA commander reported that rebel forces had crossed over into Kosovo near Tropojë, a KLA stronghold, in the days before the attack, this incursion was confirmed by an OSCE monitor.

== Incident ==
From their positions on the Yugoslavian side of the border, soldiers of the Yugoslav Army fired at least 10 shells on the town of Krumë just before midnight, where refugees from Kosovo had taken shelter. Albanian Foreign Ministry spokesman Sokol Gjoka stated that the incident did not result in casualties on either side, and that three houses had been destroyed in the fighting. The same source claim the Yugoslav troops withdrew when Albanian forces from Tropojë reached the area.

== Reactions ==
- Organization for Security and Co-operation in Europe: OSCE monitors reported that Yugoslav paratroopers had crossed the border.
- Albania: The Ministry of Foreign Affairs declared that "The infantry troops of the Serb forces have penetrated up to two kilometers (1.2 miles) inside Albania after two hours of bomb shelling on our side" On 18 April, Albania and Yugoslavia broke off all diplomatic relations.
- Yugoslavia: The Ministry of Foreign Affairs of Yugoslavia denied that Yugoslav troops had entered Albania.
- Turkey: Prime minister Bülent Ecevit stated that he would allow that "If necessary, Turkey would defend along with Albania sovereignty and independence of the befriended and brother people of Albania".
