= St. Nicholas Church, Perondi =

11th-century church in Albania

St. Nicholas Church
- Kisha e Shën Kollit (Albanian)
- Location within Albania
- 40.7881°N 19.9129°E
- Location: Perondi, Berat County, Albania

History
- Built: 11th century

Cultural Monument of Albania
- Type: Architectural
- Criteria: I
- Part of: April 17, 2015
- Reference no.: KV002

St. Nicholas Church (Albanian: Kisha e Shën Kollit) is a church in Perondi, Berat County, Albania. It became a Cultural Monument of Albania in 1963.

== History and description ==
Around 18 kilometres (11 mi) north of Berat, St. Nicholas's Church is one of the oldest Byzantine monuments in Albania. Built in the 11th century, the basilica has three naves, a wooden roof, and a vaulted altar. The narthex and belfry date to later, and in 1786 the roof was rebuilt and arches added. Specialists from the Institute of Monuments conducted renovations in 1930 and 1970, but the antiquity of the church is still evident.
