= Zhapokikë =

- Village
- Location within Albania
- Coordinates: 40°31′N 19°58′E
- Country: Albania
- County: Berat
- Municipality: Poliçan
- Administrative unit: Tërpan
- Time zone: UTC+1 (CET)
  - Summer (DST): UTC+2 (CEST)

Zhapokikë is a village in the former municipality of Tërpan in Berat County, Albania. At the 2015 local government reform it became part of the municipality Poliçan.
