= Perondi =

- Administrative unit
- Location within Albania
- Coordinates: 40°47′N 19°56′E
- Country: Albania
- County: Berat
- Municipality: Kuçovë

Population (2011)
  - Total: 9,005
- Time zone: UTC+1 (CET)
  - Summer (DST): UTC+2 (CEST)

Perondi is a village and former municipality in Berat County, central Albania. At the 2015 local government reform it became a subdivision of the municipality of Kuçovë. The population in the 2011 census was 9,005.

== General information ==
The municipality of Perondi was the biggest one in the former Kuçovë District. It is located southeast of the town of Kuçovë. It has around 10 000 inhabitants and includes the villages of: Perondi, Tapi, Rreth-Tapi, Magjate, Goraj, Velagosht, Drize and Dikater. Perondi is the primeval village in the entire region and has supposedly existed since the Byzantine Empire. The church in the center of Perondi was built in the 11th century.
