= Gjinaj =

- Administrative unit
- Location within Albania
- Coordinates: 42°7′N 20°26′E
- Country: Albania
- County: Kukës
- Municipality: Has

Population (2023)
  - Administrative unit: 522
- Time zone: UTC+1 (CET)
  - Summer (DST): UTC+2 (CEST)

Gjinaj is a village and a former municipality in the Kukës County, northeastern Albania. At the 2015 local government reform it became a subdivision of the municipality Has. The population at the 2023 census was 522.
