= Sarandë District =

Defunct (2000) Albanian administrative area

- Former district
- Coordinates: 39°49′N 20°7′E
- Country: Albania
- Dissolved: 2000
- Seat: Sarandë

Area
  - Total: 730 km^{2} (280 sq mi)

Population (2001)
  - Total: 35,235
  - Density: 48/km^{2} (130/sq mi)
- Time zone: UTC+1 (CET)
  - Summer (DST): UTC+2 (CEST)

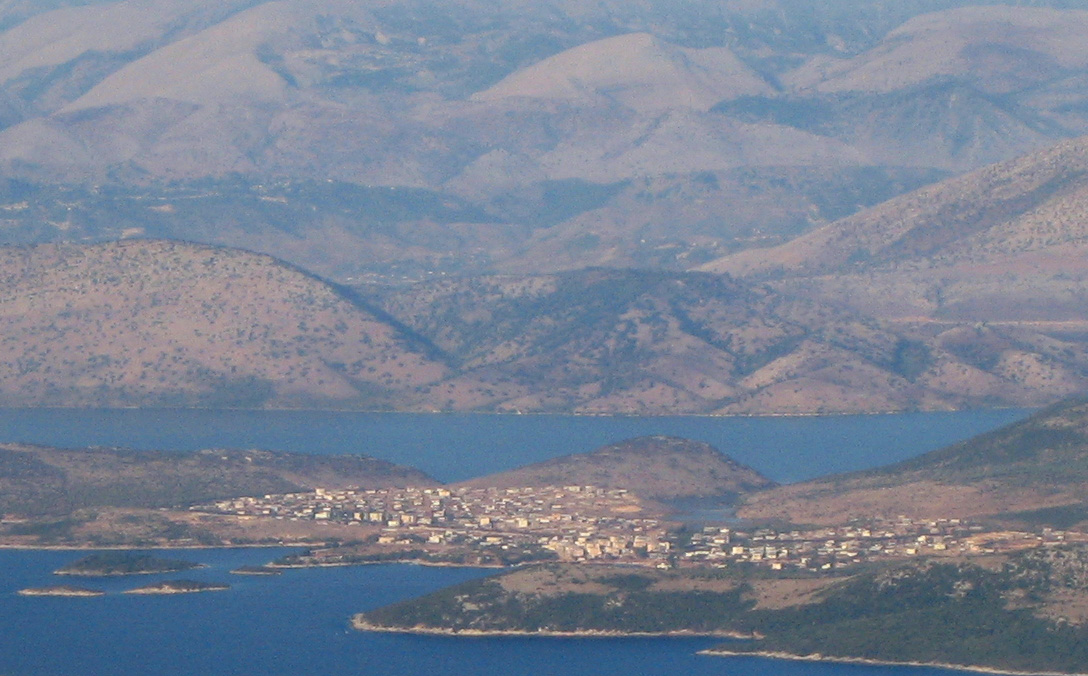
Lake Butrint and the village of Ksamil south of Sarandë seen from the Greek island Corfu

Sarandë District (Albanian: Rrethi i Sarandës) was one of the 36 districts of Albania, which were dissolved in July 2000 and replaced by 12 newly created counties. It had a population of 35,235 in 2001, and an area of 730 km^{2} (280 sq mi). The centre of the district was the city of Sarandë. Other places included Konispol (at the border with Greece), Ksamil (a resort), Çukë, Vrinë and Butrint (an archeological site). Its territory is now part of Vlorë County: the municipalities of Sarandë, Konispol, Finiq (partly) and Himara (partly).

Alongside ethnic Albanians, there is a considerable ethnic Greek minority. As of 2002, less than 30% of the inhabitants of the district were Greeks.

== Administrative divisions ==
The district consisted of the following municipalities:

- Aliko
- Dhivër
- Konispol
- Ksamil
- Livadhe
- Lukovë
- Markat
- Sarandë
- Xarrë

== Communities and settlements ==
- Sarandë
- Shkallë
- Mursi
- Vrinë
- Xarrë
- Vervë
- Leshnicë e Poshtme
