= Vërtop =

- Administrative unit
- Location within Albania
- Coordinates: 40°38′N 20°3′E
- Country: Albania
- County: Berat
- Municipality: Poliçan

Population (2011)
  - Administrative unit: 4,919
- Time zone: UTC+1 (CET)
  - Summer (DST): UTC+2 (CEST)

Vërtop is a village and a former municipality in Berat County, central Albania. At the 2015 local government reform it became a subdivision of the municipality Poliçan. The population at the 2011 census was 4,919.

== Notable people ==
- Jani Vruho
