= Vrinë =

Vrinë Βρίνα
- Village
- Location within Albania
- Coordinates: 39°44′N 20°1′E
- Country: Albania
- County: Vlorë
- Municipality: Konispol
- Administrative unit: Xarrë
- Time zone: UTC+1 (CET)
  - Summer (DST): UTC+2 (CEST)

Vrinë (Albanian definite form: Vrina; Greek: Βρίνα) is a village in the former Xarrë municipality, Vlorë County in Albania. At the 2015 local government reform it became part of the municipality Konispol.

== Name ==
The name of the village is of Greek origin: Vrina defines a place of abundant vegetation and sources of water.

== Demographics ==
Vrinë is a new village established during the communist period, and is populated by 718 Albanians (400 Muslims and 318 Orthodox) and 300 Greeks.
