= Xarrë =

Xarrë Τζάρα Dzara
- Administrative unit
- Location within Albania
- Coordinates: 39°44′N 20°3′E
- Country: Albania
- County: Vlorë
- Municipality: Konispol

Population (2011)
  - Administrative unit: 4,263
- Time zone: UTC+1 (CET)
  - Summer (DST): UTC+2 (CEST)

Xarrë (Albanian pronunciation: IPA: [d͡zar] or IPA: [d͡zarə]) is a village and a former municipality in the Vlorë County, southern Albania. At the 2015 local government reform it became a subdivision of the municipality Konispol. The population at the 2011 census was 4,263. The municipal unit consists of the villages Xarrë, Mursi, Shkallë and Vrinë.

== Name ==
Besides its Albanian name, Xarrë is also known as Τζάρα (Tzára) in Greek, and as Dzara in Aromanian. Other variants that are attested are Xarë, Qarë, and Zara.

== History ==
Traces of human presence in Xarrë can be found in the late period of the Middle Paleolithic era (40,000-30,000 years ago).

Double axes of the Mycenaean Greek type, that date from the late Bronze Age (1400-1100 BC) have been found in Xarrë. Those tools were found in wide distribution in the surrounding area: (Qeparo, Butrint, Sarande and Lleshan) and throughout the Aegean Sea, among other items of everyday use which have been classified as belonging to Mycenaean culture.

Xarrë has been attested in historical documents and maps since the 18th century, appearing as the first Ottoman position beyond the delimitations of Butrint, which at that time was a Venetian possetion.

All the Orthodox inhabitants of Xarrë claim to be descendants of families that came from a nearby village which doesn't exist anymore. This earlier village, which seems to have been abandoned during the late period of Albania under the Ottoman Empire (18th to 19th centuries), is attested in 18th-century maps with the name Zaropoula, while the locals refer to it as Palaeospitia (Greek for 'Old Houses'). Since that time, Xarrë has experienced a coexistence between Muslims and Orthodox families, though more Muslims arrived in the village with the immigrations of the Cham Albanians. Chams are said to have built in the lower parts of the village mosques in huts, the remains of which, however, did not survive.

== Municipal demographics ==
According to fieldwork done in 1991, the village of Xarrë is inhabited by an Albanian majority (2,285), 2,085 of them being Orthodox Albanians and 200 Muslim Albanian Chams that arrived from northern Greece in the 1920s and 1940s, a combined population of Aromanians and Greeks (50) and some Romani. Mursi is inhabited by an Orthodox Albanian majority, alongside a few Muslim Albanians and Greeks. Shkallë is inhabited by an Aromanian majority, alongside a few Muslim Albanians and Greeks and also contains a few families of Muslim Romani originally from Filiates, Greece who following the exodus of the Cham Albanians in 1944-1945 settled in the region. Vrinë is a new village established during the communist period and is populated by Albanians (718) and Greeks (300).

According to the 2011 Albanian census, out of the 4,263 inhabitants, the majority (53.27%) declared themselves as Greeks, 37,60% as Albanians, 0.47% as Aromanians. The rest of the population did not specify its ethnicity. However, the Advisory Committee on the Framework Convention for the Protection of National Minorities stated that "the results of the census should be viewed with the utmost caution and calls on the authorities not to rely exclusively on the data on nationality collected during the census in determining its policy on the protection of national minorities." Furthermore, the census was boycotted by a significant number of the Greek community of Albania.

According to Dana Phelps who did six months of ethnographic fieldwork in the region between 2010 and 2013, a Greek minority resides in Xarrë, who is mostly Orthodox. The village benefits from remittances of these ethnic Greek residents that move to Greece to make money. Some, however, return to Xarrë often due to discrimination in Greece and invest in small enterprises or build new homes. In 2014, the community of Xarrë had 749 Greek and 200 Aromanian inhabitants.
