= Elbasan District =

Former district of Albania

Elbasan District Rrethi i Elbasanit
- Former district
- Location of Elbasan District in Albania
- Coordinates: 41°03′N 20°04′E
- Country: Albania
- County: Elbasan County
- Abolished as local-government unit: 2000
- Seat: Elbasan

Area
  - Total: 1,290 km^{2} (500 sq mi)

Population (2001 census)
  - Total: 224,974
  - Density: 174/km^{2} (452/sq mi)
- Time zone: UTC+1 (CET)
  - Summer (DST): UTC+2 (CEST)

Elbasan District (Albanian: Rrethi i Elbasanit) was one of the former districts of Albania. Its seat was the city of Elbasan, and in its final form it covered 1,290 km^{2} (500 sq mi) in central Albania, with a population of 224,974 at the 2001 census. The district lay within Elbasan County and its former local units are now grouped mainly in the municipalities of Elbasan, Cërrik and Belsh.

== History ==
Elbasan was part of Albania's district system during the communist and early post-communist periods. The district's final boundaries were affected by the 1992 administrative changes, when Peqin District was split from Elbasan as one of ten newly created districts. Albania's decentralisation process began in 2000 with legislation that reorganised local government around counties, municipalities and communes, abolishing districts as local-government units.

A further territorial reform was adopted in 2014 and applied after the 2015 local elections. Law No. 115/2014 reduced Albania's local government units to 61 municipalities and 12 counties, replacing the former municipality-and-commune structure with larger municipalities and administrative units.

== Geography ==
The district was situated in central Albania around the middle course of the Shkumbin River. The area included the Elbasan plain and surrounding hilly and mountainous terrain; a county profile describes the former district as partly lowland and partly hilly-mountainous, with mountains such as Labinot and Shpat to the east and south-east and the hills of Dumre, Sulovë and Llixhë to the west and south-west. The same profile gives Mount Jeronisht, at 1,883 m (6,178 ft), as the highest point in the area.

The present municipality of Elbasan includes much of the district's central and eastern territory, including the city, the valley settlements and mountain administrative units such as Labinot-Mal, Gjinar, Zavalinë and Funar. Cërrik occupies a lower area between the Shkumbin and Devoll rivers and developed as an industrial town around oil-processing and power facilities. Belsh lies largely on the Dumre karst plateau, an agricultural and rural area noted by the county council for its many karst lakes.

== Demographics and economy ==
At the 2001 census, Elbasan District had 224,974 residents. A regional development report prepared with support from the United Nations Development Programme noted that, within Elbasan County, the district had a lower rural share of population than the more mountainous districts of Librazhd and Gramsh; about 56 percent of the district's population was rural in 2001.

Agriculture remained an important source of employment, but the district was more urbanised and industrial than several neighbouring areas. The same report estimated that about 56 percent of the active workforce in Elbasan District was employed in agriculture, a lower share than in Peqin or Librazhd, while industrial employment was relatively higher because of the concentrated industrial zone around Elbasan. The wider county had been one of Albania's most important heavy-industry regions before 1990, and the post-communist transition left industrial decline and unemployment as major local development issues.

== Administrative divisions ==
At the end of the district period, Elbasan District consisted of 23 local government units. After the 2015 reform, thirteen of these units were incorporated into Elbasan Municipality, five into Cërrik Municipality and five into Belsh Municipality.

- Belsh
- Bradashesh
- Cërrik
- Elbasan
- Fierzë
- Funarë
- Gjergjan
- Gjinar
- Gostimë
- Gracen
- Grekan
- Kajan
- Klos
- Labinot-Fushë
- Labinot-Mal
- Mollas
- Papër
- Rrasë
- Shalës
- Shirgjan
- Shushicë
- Tregan
- Zavalinë
