= Delvinë District =

Defunct (2000) Albanian administrative area

Delvinë District Rrethi i Delvinës
- Former district
- Coordinates: 39°58′N 20°4′E
- Country: Albania
- Dissolved: 2000
- Seat: Delvinë

Area
  - Total: 367 km^{2} (142 sq mi)

Population (2001)
  - Total: 10,859
  - Density: 29.6/km^{2} (76.6/sq mi)
- Time zone: UTC+1 (CET)
  - Summer (DST): UTC+2 (CEST)

Delvinë District (Albanian: Rrethi i Delvinës) was one of the 36 districts of Albania, which were dissolved in July 2000 and replaced by 12 counties. It had a population of 10,859 in 2001, and an area of 367 km^{2} (142 sq mi). Its population included a substantial Greek community. The district is in the south of the country, and its capital was the town of Delvinë. Its territory is now part of Vlorë County: the municipalities of Delvinë and Finiq (partly).

== Administrative divisions ==
The district consisted of the following municipalities:

- **Delvinë**
- Vergo
- **Finiq**
- Mesopotam

Note: - urban municipalities in bold
