= Skrapar District =

Defunct (2000) Albanian administrative area

Skrapar District Rrethi i Skraparit
- Former district
- Coordinates: 40°33′N 20°15′E
- Country: Albania
- Dissolved: 2000
- Seat: Çorovodë

Area
  - Total: 775 km^{2} (299 sq mi)

Population (2001)
  - Total: 29,874
  - Density: 38.5/km^{2} (99.8/sq mi)
- Time zone: UTC+1 (CET)
  - Summer (DST): UTC+2 (CEST)

Skrapar District (Albanian: Rrethi i Skraparit) was one of the 36 districts of Albania, which were dissolved in July 2000 and replaced by 12 newly created counties. It had a population of 29,874 in 2001, and an area of 775 km^{2} (299 sq mi). It was in the centre of the country, and its capital was the town of Çorovodë. Its territory is now part of Berat County: the municipalities of Skrapar and Poliçan (partly).

== Administrative divisions ==
The district consisted of the following municipalities:

- Bogovë
- Çepan
- Çorovodë
- Gjerbës
- Leshnjë
- Poliçan
- Potom
- Qendër Skrapar
- Vëndreshë
- Zhepë

== Notable people ==
- Abas Ermenji, Albanian politician and historian
- Riza Cerova, Albanian political figure
- Xhelal bej Koprencka, modern Albania's founding father
- Ilir Meta, Albanian politician

== Gallery ==
Kasabashi Bridge near Çorovodë

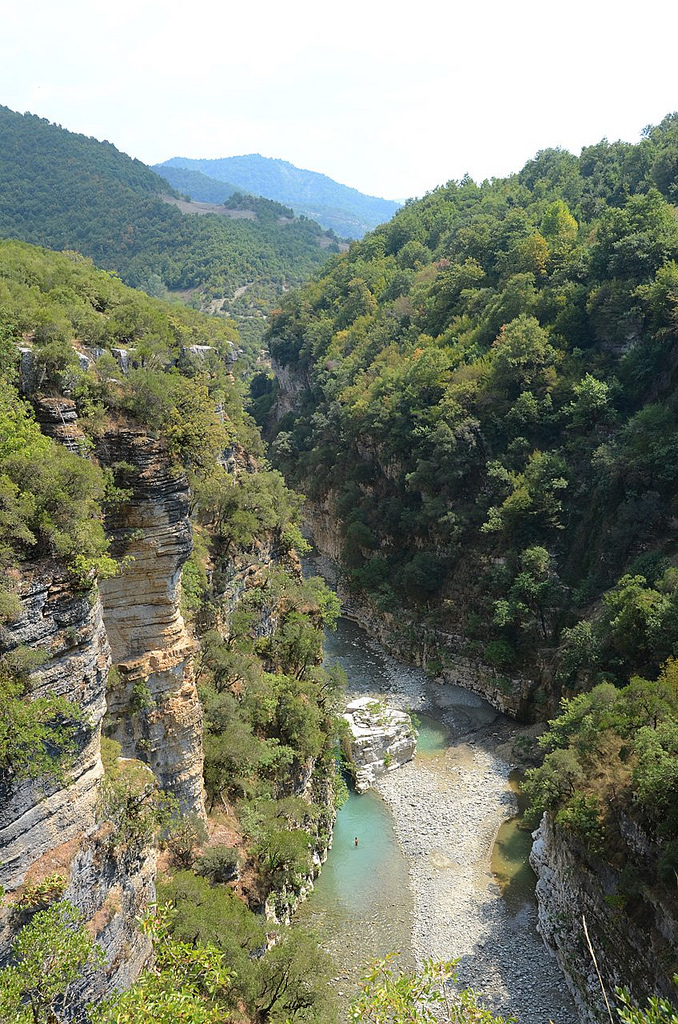
Osum Canyon

Gradec Cliffs near Çorovodë
