= Berat District =

Defunct (2000) Albanian administrative area

- Former district
- Coordinates: 40°40′N 19°57′E
- Country: Albania
- Dissolved: 2000
- Seat: Berat

Area
  - Total: 915 km^{2} (353 sq mi)

Population (2001)
  - Total: 128,410
  - Density: 140/km^{2} (363/sq mi)
- Time zone: UTC+1 (CET)
  - Summer (DST): UTC+2 (CEST)

Berat District (Albanian: Rrethi i Beratit) was one of the 36 districts of Albania, which were dissolved in July 2000 and replaced by 12 counties. It had a population of 128,410 in 2001, and an area of 915 km^{2} (353 sq mi). It is in the centre of the country, and its capital was the city of Berat. Another large population centre in this district was Ura Vajgurore. Its territory is now part of Berat County: the municipalities of Berat, Dimal, Poliçan (partly) and Kuçovë (partly).

This is also the birthplace of Sejfi Protopapa, a Balli Kombëtar leader.

== Administrative divisions ==
The district consisted of the following municipalities:

- Berat
- Cukalat
- Kutalli
- Lumas
- Otllak
- Poshnjë
- Roshnik
- Sinjë
- Tërpan
- Ura Vajgurore
- Velabisht
- Vërtop
