= Krumë =

- Town
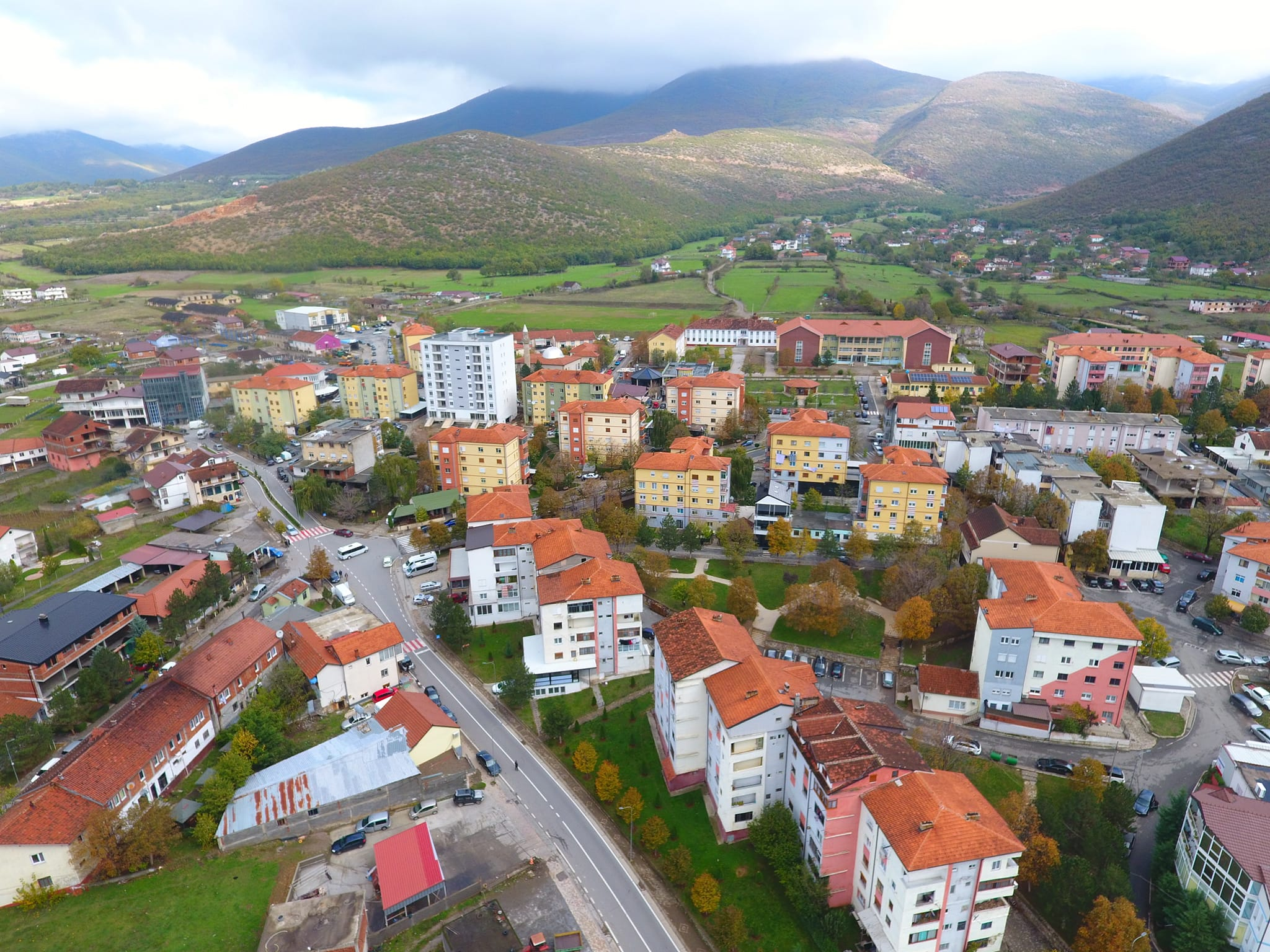

- Location within Albania
- Coordinates: 42°12′N 20°25′E
- Country: Albania
- County: Kukës
- Municipality: Has
- Elevation: 430 m (1,410 ft)

Population (2023)
  - Administrative unit: 4,814
- Time zone: UTC+1 (CET)
  - Summer (DST): UTC+2 (CEST)
- Postal Code: 8601-8602
- Area Code: 0214

Krumë is a town in northern Albania. It is located in a mountainous region, within Kukës County in the municipality of Has. It is the principal town in the ethnographic region of Has, which is inhabited by a population that has maintained distinct cultural traditions over centuries.

== History ==
In April 1999, Yugoslav soldiers fired shells at Krumë, where refugees from Kosovo had taken shelter.The incident resulted in no casualties, but three houses were destroyed.

== Geography ==
Krumë is located at about 430 m above sea level. It is a small town at the north-west foot of the Bjeshka e Krumes mountain (English: Kruma Highland, Mount of Kruma), from which comes a large 'source' of underground water called Vrella with clean water serving the domestic population's needs for fresh water. Maja e Gjytezës, a mountain located few kilometers south of Krumë, reaches an altitude of 1435m above sea level. Krumë is about 10 km from the Kosovo border.

== Economy ==
The main activities are copper mining and agriculture. There has been some effort to boost the local economy through cross-border trade with Kosovo and the promotion of small-scale tourism, particularly among those interested in rural tourism, hiking, and exploring the natural environment of the Has region.

== See also ==
- Albania-Yugoslav border incident (1999)
