= Has (municipality) =

Municipality in Albania

- Municipality
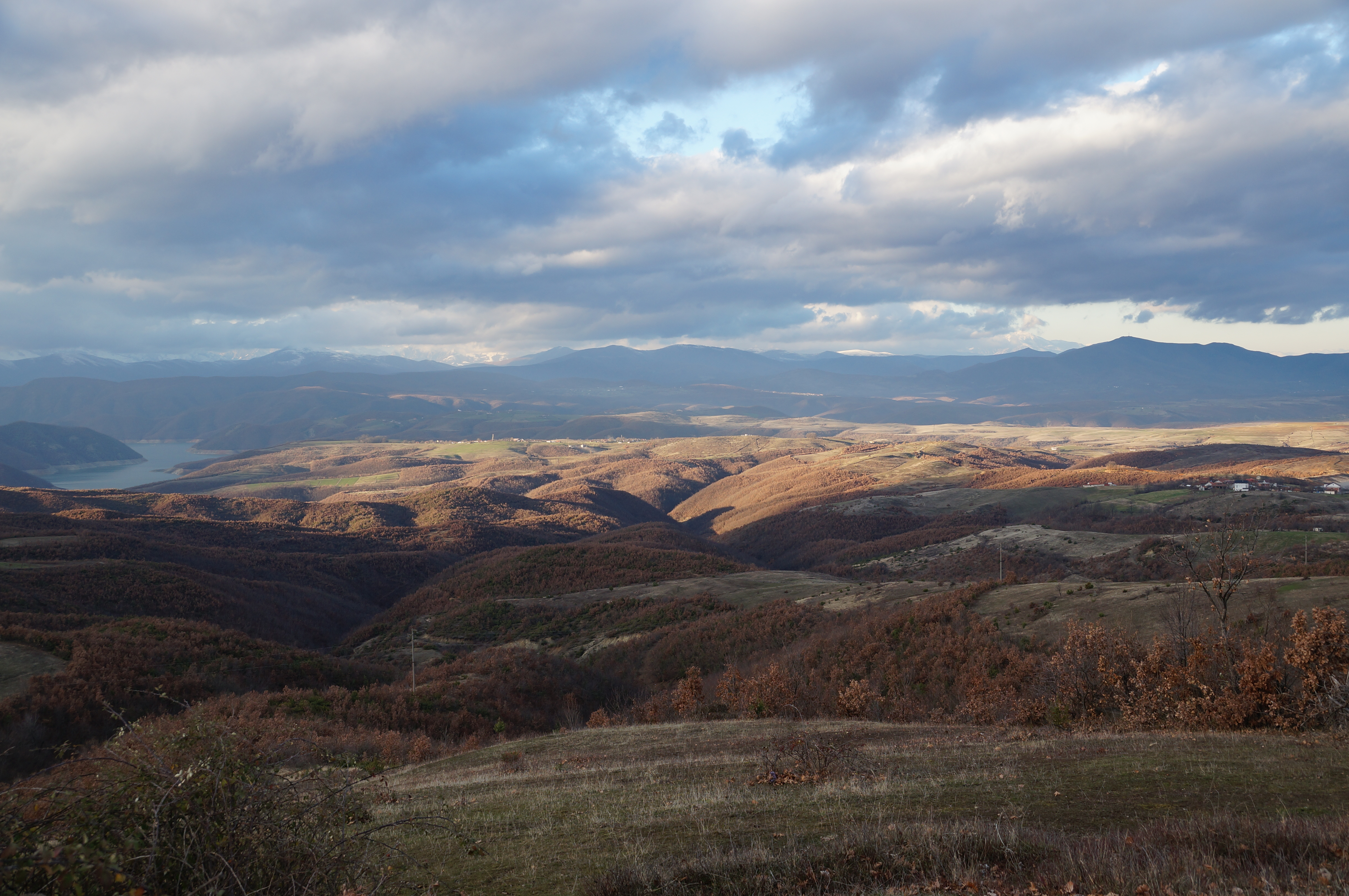
- View of the Has Mountains

- Emblem

- Location within Albania
- Coordinates: 42°12′N 20°25′E
- Country: Albania
- County: Kukës
- Seat: Krumë

Government
  - Mayor: Miftar Dauti (BF)

Area
  - Municipality: 374 km^{2} (144 sq mi)

Population (2011)
  - Municipality: 16,790
  - Municipality density: 44.9/km^{2} (116/sq mi)
- Demonym(s): Albanian: Hasjan (m), Hasjane (f)
- Time zone: UTC+1 (CET)
  - Summer (DST): UTC+2 (CEST)
- Postal Code: 8601-8602
- Area Code: (0)218
- Website: www.bashkiahas.gov.al

Has (Albanian: [ˈhaˈs]; Albanian definite form: Hasi) is a municipality in Kukës County, northeastern Albania. The municipality consists of the administrative units of Fajzë, Gjinaj, Golaj with Krumë constituting its seat. As of the Institute of Statistics estimate from the 2011 census, there were 4,117 people residing in Has Municipality. The area of the municipality is 399.62 km^{2}. It is encompassed within the Albanian ethnographic region of Has.
