= Districts of Albania =

Administrative divisions of Albania

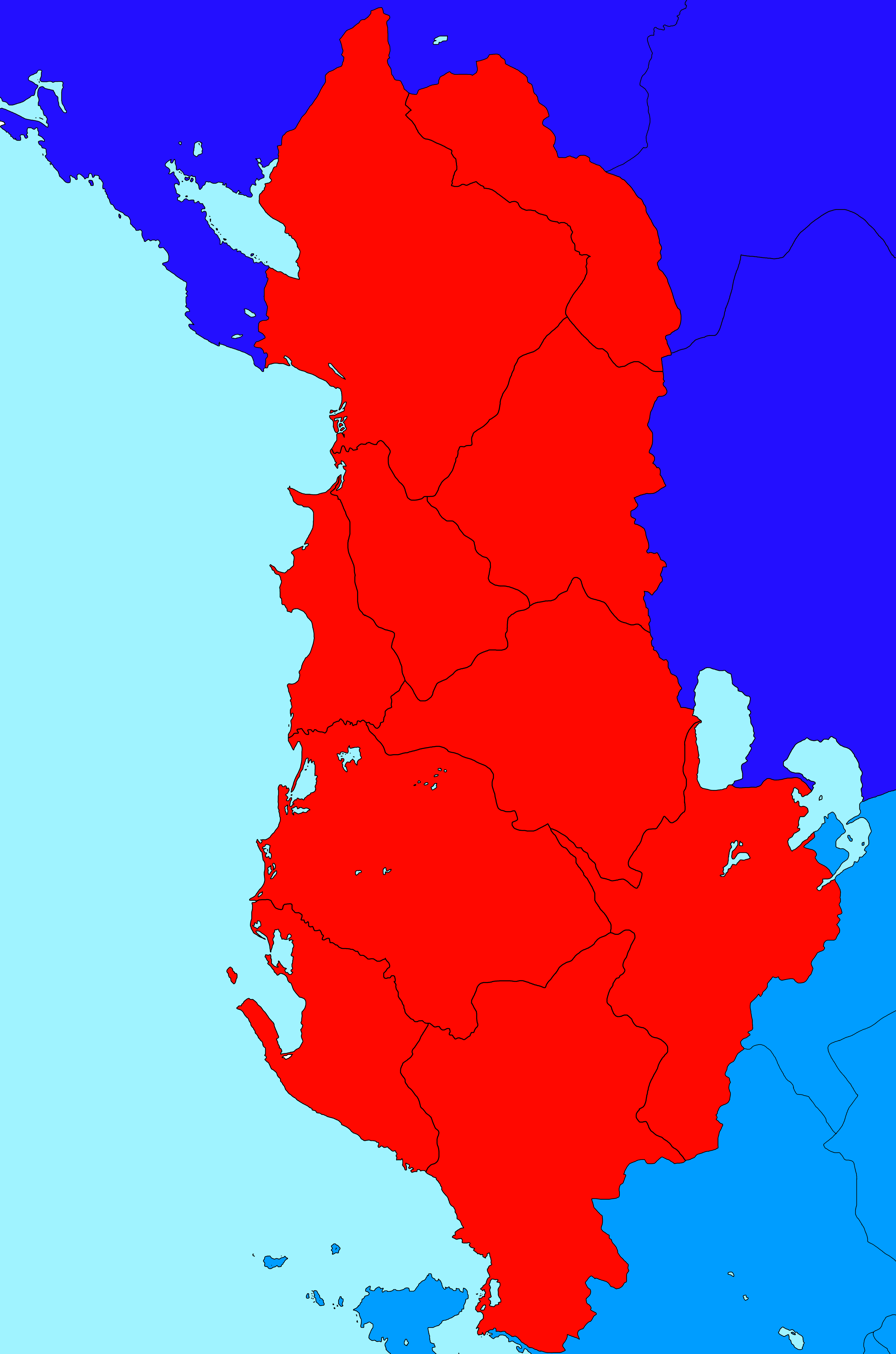
Regional map of Albania 1930

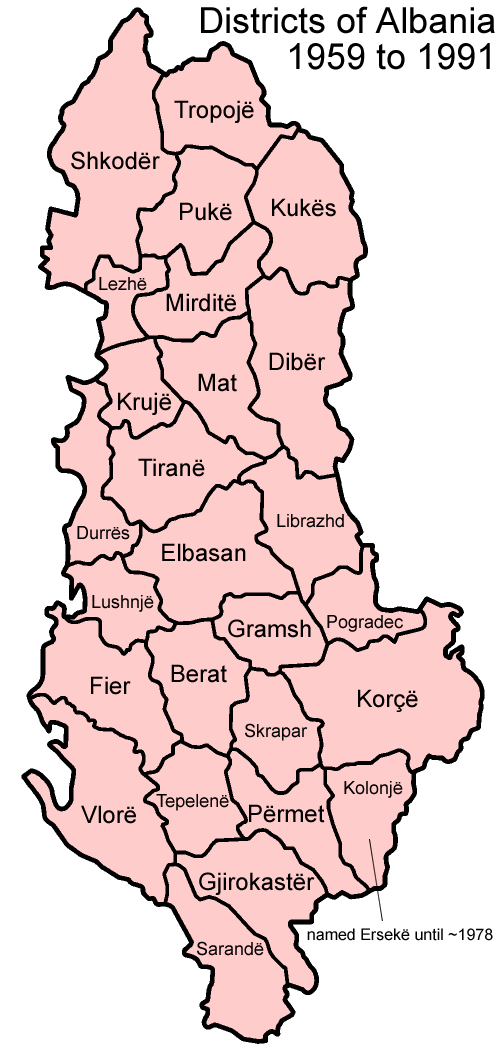
Districts of Albania from 1959–1991.

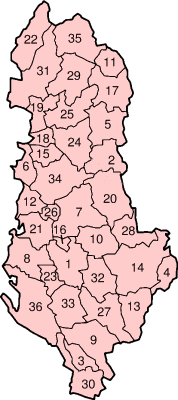
Districts of Albania from 1991–2000

Districts (Albanian: rrathë or rrathët) were first and second-level administrative divisions of Albania from 1913–2000. Their number, size, and status changed over time. From 1991 to 2000, the 36 districts were organized into 12 counties. Pursuant to the 1998 Constitution and Law No. 8653, the districts were abolished and replaced with the larger counties and smaller municipalities.

== History ==
After its Declaration of Independence from the Ottoman Empire in 1912, Albania was divided into districts until the year 2000. During the 1920s and 1930s, there were 39 districts. These were consolidated into 26 in 1939. They were reorganized in 1959. In 1978, Ersekë District was renamed to Kolonjë. In 1991 ten more districts were added: Bulqizë (previously under Dibër), Delvinë (Sarandë), Devoll (Korçë), Has (Kukës), Kavajë (Durrës), Kuçovë (Berat), Kurbin (Krujë), Malësi e Madhe (Shkodër), Mallakastër (Fier) and Peqin (Elbasan). From 1991 to 2000, the 36 districts were organized into 12 counties. The 1998 constitutional reforms came into effect as Law No. 8653 on 31 July 2000, abolishing the districts and replacing them with 12 counties as the first-level administrative division and urban and rural municipalities as the second-level division.

== List ==
=== 1959–1991 ===
Berat, Dibër, Durrës, Elbasan, Fier, Gjirokastër, Gramsh, Kolonjë, Korçë, Krujë, Kukës, Lezhë, Librazhd, Lushnjë, Mat, Mirditë, Përmet, Pogradec, Pukë, Sarandë, Shkodër, Skrapar, Tepelenë, Tirana, Tropojë, Vlorë

=== 1991–2000 ===
1. Berat
2. Bulqizë
3. Delvinë
4. Devoll
5. Dibër
6. Durrës
7. Elbasan
8. Fier
9. Gjirokastër
10. Gramsh
11. Has
12. Kavajë

13. Kolonjë
14. Korçë
15. Krujë
16. Kuçovë
17. Kukës
18. Kurbin
19. Lezhë
20. Librazhd
21. Lushnjë
22. Malësi e Madhe
23. Mallakastër
24. Mat

25. Mirditë
26. Peqin
27. Përmet
28. Pogradec
29. Pukë
30. Sarandë
31. Shkodër
32. Skrapar
33. Tepelenë
34. Tirana
35. Tropojë
36. Vlorë
