= Lezhë District =

Defunct (2000) Albanian administrative area

Lezhë District Rrethi i Lezhës
- Former district
- Coordinates: 41°49′N 19°41′E
- Country: Albania
- Dissolved: 2000
- Seat: Lezhë

Area
  - Total: 479 km^{2} (185 sq mi)

Population (2001)
  - Total: 68,218
  - Density: 142/km^{2} (369/sq mi)
- Time zone: UTC+1 (CET)
  - Summer (DST): UTC+2 (CEST)

Lezhë District (Albanian: Rrethi i Lezhës) was one of the 36 districts of Albania, which were dissolved in July 2000 and replaced by 12 newly created counties. It had a population of 68,218 in 2001, and an area of 479 km^{2} (185 sq mi). It is in the north-west of the country, and its capital was the city of Lezhë. The area of the former district is coextensive with the present municipality of Lezhë, which is part of Lezhë County.

Lezhë District is located in north Albania and is a region with thousands of years of history. In Lezhë the League of Lezhë was created under the order of Gjergj Kastrioti Skanderbeg.

Many famous people are from Lezhë, such as Frang Bardhi and Gjergj Fishta. The waves of the Adriatic Sea which hit the shore of Lezhë start at the Shëngjin Harbor, one of the three largest harbors of Albania, and up to Tale. The rivers Mat and Drin flow through the district and pour into the Adriatic Sea.

== Administrative divisions ==
The district consisted of the following municipalities (population in 2007 in parentheses):

- Balldren i Ri (9,872)
- Blinisht (5,177)
- Dajç (7,053)
- Kallmet (6,607)
- Kolsh (6,259)
- **Lezhë** (24,994)
- Shëngjin (10,340)
- Shënkoll (13,523)
- Ungrej (3,154)
- Zejmen (8,752)

Note: - urban municipalities in bold
