= Tropojë District =

Defunct (2000) Albanian administrative area

Tropojë District Rrethi i Tropojës
- Former district
- Coordinates: 42°23′N 20°3′E
- Country: Albania
- Dissolved: 2000
- Seat: Bajram Curri

Area
  - Total: 1,043 km^{2} (403 sq mi)

Population (2001)
  - Total: 28,154
  - Density: 26.99/km^{2} (69.91/sq mi)
- Time zone: UTC+1 (CET)
  - Summer (DST): UTC+2 (CEST)

Tropojë District (Albanian: Rrethi i Tropojës, pronunciation: /tropɔɪə/) was one of the 36 districts of Albania, which were dissolved in July 2000 and replaced by 12 newly created counties. It had a population of 28,154 in 2001, and an area of 1,043 km^{2} (403 sq mi). It was in the north of the country, and its capital was the town of Bajram Curri. The area of the former district is coextensive with the present municipality of Tropojë, which is part of Kukës County. The area is known for its massive chestnuts forests and the river Valbonë, as well a rich folk culture.

== Administrative divisions ==
The district consisted of the following municipalities:

- **Bajram Curri**
- Bujan
- Bytyç
- Fierzë
- Lekbibaj
- Llugaj
- Margegaj
- Tropojë

Note: - urban municipalities in bold
