= Bulqizë District =

Defunct (2000) Albanian administrative area

Bulqizë District Rrethi i Bulqizës
- Former district
- Coordinates: 41°28′N 20°21′E
- Country: Albania
- Dissolved: 2000
- Seat: Bulqizë

Area
  - Total: 718 km^{2} (277 sq mi)

Population (2001)
  - Total: 42,985
  - Density: 59.9/km^{2} (155/sq mi)
- Time zone: UTC+1 (CET)
  - Summer (DST): UTC+2 (CEST)

Bulqizë District (Albanian: Rrethi i Bulqizës) was one of the 36 districts of Albania, which were dissolved in July 2000 and replaced by 12 counties. It had a population of 42,985 in 2001, and an area of 718 km^{2} (277 sq mi). Located in the east of the country, its capital was the town of Bulqizë. The area of the former district is coextensive with the present municipality of Bulqizë, which is part of Dibër County.

== Administrative divisions ==
The district consisted of the following municipalities:

- **Bulqizë**
- Fushë-Bulqizë
- Gjoricë
- Martanesh
- Ostren
- Shupenzë
- Trebisht
- Zerqan

Note: - urban municipalities in bold
