= Përmet District =

Defunct (2000) Albanian administrative area

Përmet District Rrethi i Përmetit
- Former district
- Coordinates: 40°16′N 20°19′E
- Country: Albania
- Dissolved: 2000
- Seat: Përmet

Area
  - Total: 929 km^{2} (359 sq mi)

Population (2001)
  - Total: 25,837
  - Density: 27.8/km^{2} (72.0/sq mi)
- Time zone: UTC+1 (CET)
  - Summer (DST): UTC+2 (CEST)

Përmet District (Albanian: Rrethi i Përmetit) was one of the 36 districts of Albania, which were dissolved in July 2000 and replaced by 12 newly created counties. It had a population of 25,837 in 2001, and an area of 929 km^{2} (359 sq mi). Its area has an Aromanian minority. It is in the south-east of the country, and its capital was the town of Përmet. Its territory is now part of Gjirokastër County: the municipalities of Përmet and Këlcyrë.

Despite the limited number of excavations carried out so far, a series of important sites has been identified in the district. The finds attest to the long history of inhabitation in this part of the country. Of special importance is the cave near the village of Bënja, which produced evidence of continuous habitation from the Eneolithic to the Iron Age. Additionally, an important necropolis has been unearthed near the village of Piskova in the upper Vjosë valley. The three excavated tumuli contained many graves and grave goods dating from the Early Bronze Age to the Early Middle Ages.

The District of Përmet has traditionally been renowned for the production of wine and rakı, a beverage of high alcohol content distilled from grape fermentation and traditionally home-made. Geographical features are Dhëmbel, Nemërçkë, Trebeshinë mountains, Vjosë river, and Bënjë hot springs. The town of Permeti is known for its rose and flowery landscapes; also known nationally as "the town of the roses". This small town is famous for its tradition of folk music and it is hometown to Laver Bariu, a renowned clarinet folk artist. The district incorporates Fir of Hotova National Park.

== Administrative divisions ==
The district consisted of the following municipalities:

- Ballaban
- Çarçovë
- Dishnicë
- Frashër
- Këlcyrë
- Përmet
- Petran
- Qendër Piskovë
- Sukë

== See also ==
- Tourism in Albania
- Music of Albania
