= Mirditë District =

Defunct (2000) Albanian administrative area

- Former district
- Country: Albania
- Dissolved: 2000
- Seat: Rrëshen

Area
  - Total: 867 km^{2} (335 sq mi)

Population (2001)
  - Total: 37,055
  - Density: 42.7/km^{2} (111/sq mi)
- Time zone: UTC+1 (CET)
  - Summer (DST): UTC+2 (CEST)
- Postal Code: 4601-4603

Mirditë District (Albanian: Rrethi i Mirditës) was one of the 36 districts of Albania, which were dissolved in July 2000 and replaced by 12 newly created counties. It had a population of 37,055 in 2001, and an area of 867 km^{2} (335 sq mi). It is in the north of the country, and its capital was the town of Rrëshen. The district was located within the wider region of Mirdita, whose territory is synonymous with the historic Albanian tribe of the same name. The area of the former district is coextensive with the present municipality of Mirditë, which is part of Lezhë County.

== Administrative divisions ==
The district consisted of the following municipalities:

- Fan
- Kaçinar
- Kthellë
- Orosh
- **Rrëshen**
- **Rubik**
- Selitë

Note: - urban municipalities in bold

== Gallery ==
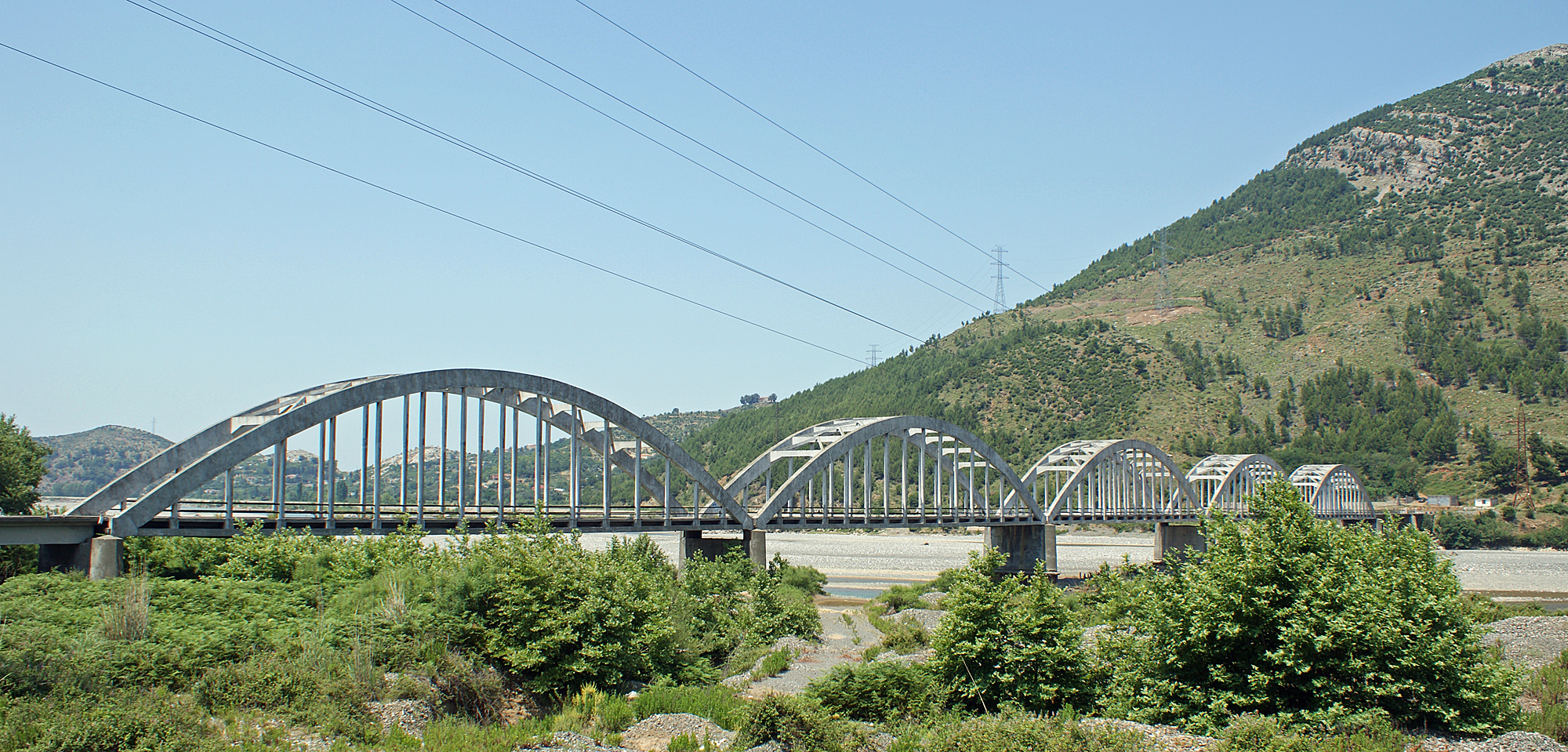
Zogu Bridge

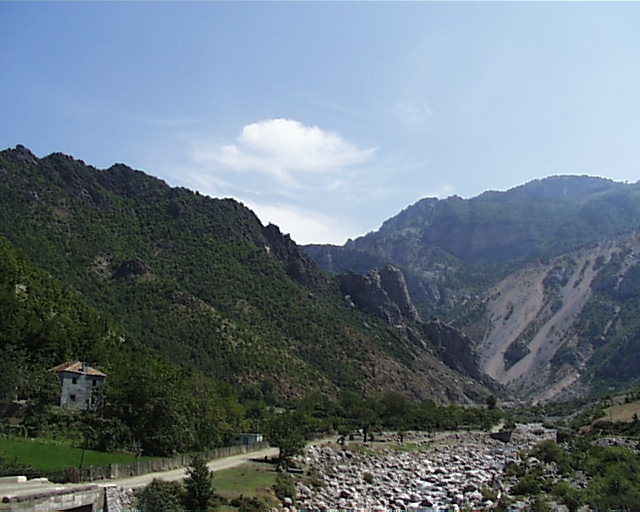
Fan River Canyon

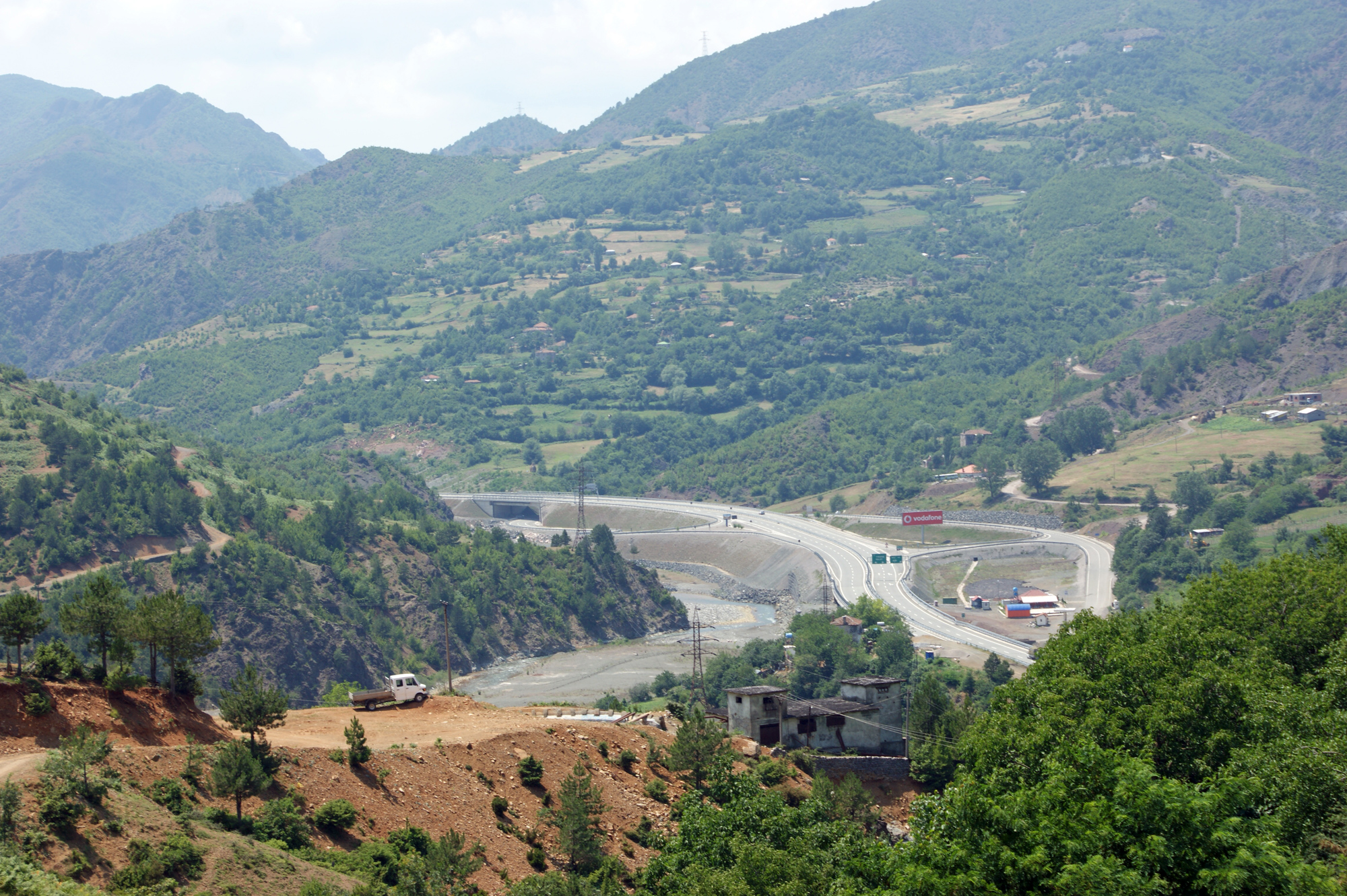
Fan Valley in Reps

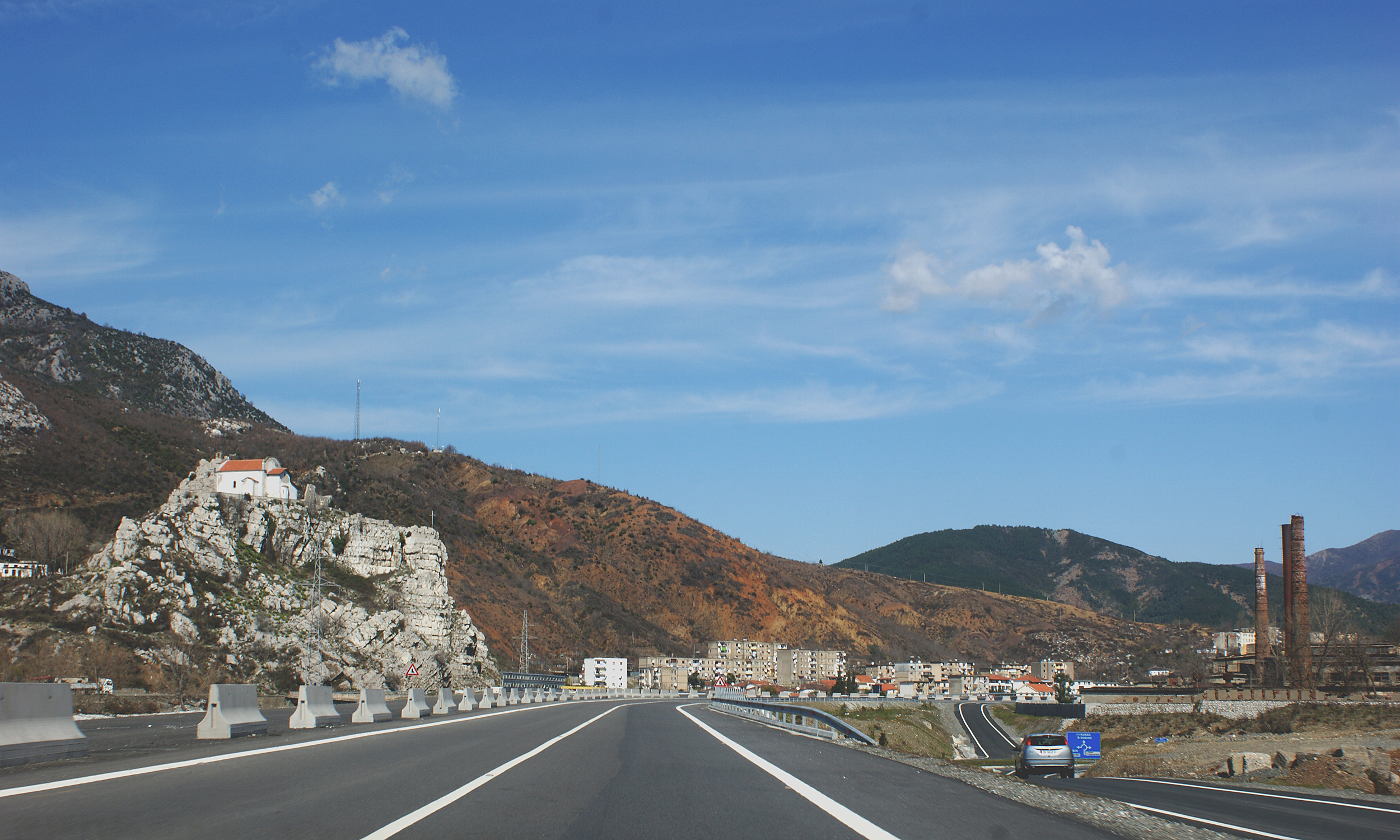
Rubik Church on top left along A1 Highway

== See also ==
- Republic of Mirdita
- Mirditë (municipality), municipality in Lezhë County
- Mirdita, region
