= Durrës District =

Defunct (2000) Albanian administrative area

Durrës District Rrethi i Durrësit
- Former district
- Coordinates: 41°24′N 19°31′E
- Country: Albania
- Dissolved: 2000
- Seat: Durrës

Area
  - Total: 455 km^{2} (176 sq mi)

Population (2001)
  - Total: 182,988
  - Density: 402/km^{2} (1,040/sq mi)
- Time zone: UTC+1 (CET)
  - Summer (DST): UTC+2 (CEST)

Durrës District (Albanian: Rrethi i Durrësit) was one of the 36 districts of Albania, which were dissolved in July 2000, when they were replaced by 12 counties. It had a population of 182,988 in 2001, and an area of 455 km^{2} (176 sq mi). The district seat was the city of Durrës, and it was succeeded by Durrës County. Positioned on the Albanian Adriatic Sea coast, it is a region of significant historical importance, and served as a crucial maritime port. The district is characterized by a mix of flat plains, low hills, and a substantial coastline, contributing to its diverse geography and strategic economic role.

== History ==
Durrës, has a rich history spanning approximately 2,500 years, making it one of Albania's oldest continuously inhabited regions. Durrës was founded around the 7th century BCE as Epidamnos by ancient Greek colonists from Corinth and Corcyra, in cooperation with the local Illyrian Taulantii tribe. The city later became known as Dyrrachium and flourished as an integral part of the Roman Empire and its successor, the Byzantine Empire. It was the starting point of the Via Egnatia, a significant Roman military highway that traversed the Balkan Peninsula to Constantinople. In the Middle Ages, Durrës was a contested territory, passing between Bulgarians, Venetians, local Albanian noble families, and eventually falling under Ottoaman rule from 1501 until 1912. Following Albania's Declaration of Independence, Durrës briefly served as the capital of the Principality of Albania. It was subsequently annexed by the Kingdom of Italy during the interwar period and occupied by Nazi Germany during Second World War. As a part of Albania, Durrës experienced significant demographic and economic expansion. The city has been subjected to numerous strong earthquakes throughout its history, some of which caused extensive destruction.

== Geography ==
Durrës District is situated in the western lowlands of Albania, on a flat alluvial plain located between the river mouths of Erzen and Ishëm rivers along the Adriatic Sea within the Mediterranean Sea. The district is part of the Albanian Adriatic Sea Coast, which extends to the Western Lowlands on a flat alluvial and coastal plain. The area is generally low-lying, but also includes surrounding hills.

The topography of Durrës District is primarily characterized by a flat alluvial plain along the Adriatic coast, formed by the deposits of the Erzen and Ishëm rivers. This plain extends inland from the coastline. The area features low-lying hills, with the highest peaks in the Rodon–Erzeni Hills reaching 272 meters and in the Durrës Hills reaching 178 meters. Geologically, the Durrës Bay and its surrounding weathered hills are situated on thick, unconsolidated Quaternary sediments. The region is part of the Peri-Adriatic Foredeep, a segment of the convergent margin of the Eurasia Plate, where the Albanian orogenic front thrusts over the Adria microplate. This geological setting makes the Durrës region susceptible to a compressional stress regime, affected by active thrust and back-thrust faults. The climate of Durrës is profoundly influenced by a seasonal Mediterranean climate, with dry, hot summers and mild, wet winters.

=== Administrative divisions ===
The district consisted of the following municipalities: Durrës, Gjepalaj, Ishëm, Katund i Ri, Maminas, Manëz, Rrashbull, Shijak, Sukth, and Xhafzotaj.

== Demographics and Economy ==
It had a population of 182,988 in 2001, and an area of 455 km^{2} (176 sq mi). The district seat was the city of Durrës, and it was succeeded by Durrës County. The economy of Durrës District was significantly influenced by the Port of Durrës, which is the busiest and largest seaport in Albania. It was one of the largest passenger ports on the Adriatic and Ionian Sea, with an annual passenger volume of approximately 1.5 million in 2014. The port serves as a main entry point for goods to Albania and Kosovo, and also as a transit hub for North Macedonia, Montenegro, and Serbia.
