= Krujë District =

Defunct (2000) Albanian administrative area

Krujë District Rrethi i Krujës
- Former district
- Coordinates: 41°29′N 19°44′E
- Country: Albania
- Dissolved: 2000
- Seat: Krujë

Area
  - Total: 372 km^{2} (144 sq mi)

Population (2001)
  - Total: 64,357
  - Density: 173/km^{2} (448/sq mi)
- Time zone: UTC+1 (CET)
  - Summer (DST): UTC+2 (CEST)

Krujë District (Albanian: Rrethi i Krujës) was one of the 36 districts of Albania, which were dissolved in July 2000 and replaced by 12 counties. It had a population of 64,357 in 2001, and an area of 372 km^{2} (144 sq mi). It is in the centre of the country, and its capital was the town of Krujë. The area of the former district is coextensive with the present municipality of Krujë, which is part of Durrës County.

== Administrative divisions ==
The district consisted of the following municipalities:

- Bubq
- Cudhi
- **Fushë-Krujë**
- Kodër-Thumanë
- **Krujë**
- Nikël

Note: - urban municipalities in bold
