= Kurbin District =

Defunct (2000) Albanian administrative area

Kurbin District Rrethi i Kurbinit
- Former district
- Coordinates: 41°37′N 19°42′E
- Country: Albania
- Dissolved: 2000
- Seat: Laç

Area
  - Total: 235 km^{2} (91 sq mi)

Population (2001)
  - Total: 54,519
  - Density: 232/km^{2} (601/sq mi)
- Time zone: UTC+1 (CET)
  - Summer (DST): UTC+2 (CEST)

Kurbin District (Albanian: Rrethi i Kurbinit) was one of the 36 districts of Albania, which were dissolved in July 2000 and replaced by 12 newly created counties. It had a population of 54,519 in 2001, and an area of 235 km^{2} (91 sq mi). It is in the west of the country, and its capital was the town of Laç. The area of the former district is coextensive with the present municipality of Kurbin, which is part of Lezhë County.

== Administrative divisions ==
The district consisted of the following municipalities:

- Fushë-Kuqe
- **Laç**
- **Mamurras**
- Milot

Note: - urban municipalities in bold
