= Kuçovë District =

Defunct (2000) Albanian administrative area

Kuçovë District Rrethi i Kuçovës
- Former district
- Coordinates: 40°49′N 19°54′E
- Country: Albania
- Dissolved: 2000
- Seat: Kuçovë

Area
  - Total: 112 km^{2} (43 sq mi)

Population (2001)
  - Total: 35,571
  - Density: 318/km^{2} (823/sq mi)
- Time zone: UTC+1 (CET)
  - Summer (DST): UTC+2 (CEST)

Kuçovë District (Albanian: Rrethi i Kuçovës) was one of the 36 districts of Albania, which were dissolved in July 2000 and replaced by 12 counties. It had a population of 35,571 in 2001, and an area of 112 km^{2} (43 sq mi), making it the smallest district of Albania. It was in the centre of the country, and its capital was the former municipality of Kuçovë (which in 2015 became a subunit of the larger municipality of the same name). Its territory is now part of Berat County — the Municipality of Kuçovë (partly).

== Administrative divisions ==
The district consisted of the following municipalities:

- Kozare
- **Kuçovë**
- Perondi

Note: - urban municipalities in bold

== Description ==
Kuçovë is one of the main centres of the Albanian oil industry, and the town of Kuçovë was built with Soviet assistance in the 1950s. It is of interest to students of communist architecture and planning, although much of the oil infrastructure predates the communist period and was installed by the Italians during the Zogist period. Today all of the oil wells are functioning, and in some places oil seeps to the surface. Kuçovë has had the largest oil reserves in Albania and there is currently a lot of oil unexplored. The communist regime built Kuçovë into an industrial city, among the most industrialized in the country.

The town had suffered very badly during the post-communist period, there are many abandoned factories and power plants in and around the town, and is visibly poorer than the neighbouring towns such as Berat.

Kuçovë was formerly a closed military district, and the air base in Kuçovë remains one of the largest in Albania, and aged MiG fighters from the 1950s could be seen flying on a regular basis until they were finally grounded in late 2005.
