= Pukë District =

Defunct (2000) Albanian administrative area

Pukë District Rrethi i Pukës
- Former district
- Coordinates: 42°4′N 19°59′E
- Country: Albania
- Dissolved: 2000
- Seat: Pukë

Area
  - Total: 1,034 km^{2} (399 sq mi)

Population (2001)
  - Total: 34,454
  - Density: 33.32/km^{2} (86.30/sq mi)
- Time zone: UTC+1 (CET)
  - Summer (DST): UTC+2 (CEST)

Pukë District (Albanian: Rrethi i Pukës) was one of the 36 districts of Albania, which were dissolved in July 2000 and replaced by 12 newly created counties. It had a population of 34,454 in 2001, and an area of 1,034 km^{2} (399 sq mi). It is located in the north of the country and its capital was the town of Pukë. Its territory is now part of Shkodër County: the municipalities of Fushë-Arrëz and Pukë.

== Administrative divisions ==
The district consisted of the following municipalities:

- Blerim
- Fierzë
- Fushë-Arrëz
- Gjegjan
- Iballë
- Pukë
- Qafë-Mali
- Qelëz
- Qerret
- Rrapë
