= Tirana District =

Defunct (2000) Albanian administrative area

- Former district
- Country: Albania
- Dissolved: 2000
- Seat: Tirana

Area
  - Total: 1,193 km^{2} (461 sq mi)

Population (2001)
  - Total: 523,150
  - Density: 438.5/km^{2} (1,136/sq mi)
- Time zone: UTC+1 (CET)
  - Summer (DST): UTC+2 (CEST)

Projected map of Tiranë District as defined by the Territorial-Administrative Reform of 2014

Tirana District (Albanian: Rrethi i Tiranës) was one of the 36 districts of Albania, which were dissolved in July 2000 and replaced by 12 newly created counties. It had a population of 523,150 in 2001, and an area of 1,193 km^{2} (461 sq mi). Its territory is now part of Tirana County: the municipalities of Tirana, Kamëz and Vorë.

== Administrative divisions ==
The district consisted of the following municipalities:

- Baldushk
- Bërxullë
- Bërzhitë
- Dajt
- Farkë
- Kamëz
- Kashar
- Krrabë
- Ndroq
- Paskuqan
- Petrelë
- Pezë
- Prezë
- Shëngjergj
- Tirana
- Vaqarr
- Vorë
- Zall-Bastar
- Zall-Herr

== See also ==
- Villages of Tirana County
