= Malësi e Madhe District =

Defunct (2000) Albanian administrative area

Malësi e Madhe District Rrethi i Malësisë së Madhe
- Former district
- Coordinates: 42°21′N 19°35′E
- Country: Albania
- Dissolved: 2000
- Seat: Koplik

Area
  - Total: 897 km^{2} (346 sq mi)

Population (2001)
  - Total: 36,770
  - Density: 41.0/km^{2} (106/sq mi)
- Time zone: UTC+1 (CET)
  - Summer (DST): UTC+2 (CEST)

Malësi e Madhe District (Albanian: Rrethi i Malësisë së Madhe), commonly known as Malësia, was one of the 36 districts of Albania, which were dissolved in July 2000 and replaced by 12 newly created counties. It had a population of 36,770 in 2001, and an area of 897 km^{2} (346 sq mi). It is in the north of the country, and its capital was the town of Koplik. The area of the former district is coextensive with the present municipality of Malësi e Madhe, which is part of Shkodër County.

== Administrative divisions ==
The district consisted of the following municipalities:

- Gruemirë
- Kastrat
- Kelmend
- **Koplik**
- Qendër
- Shkrel

Note: – urban municipalities in bold
