= Poliçan =

- Municipality
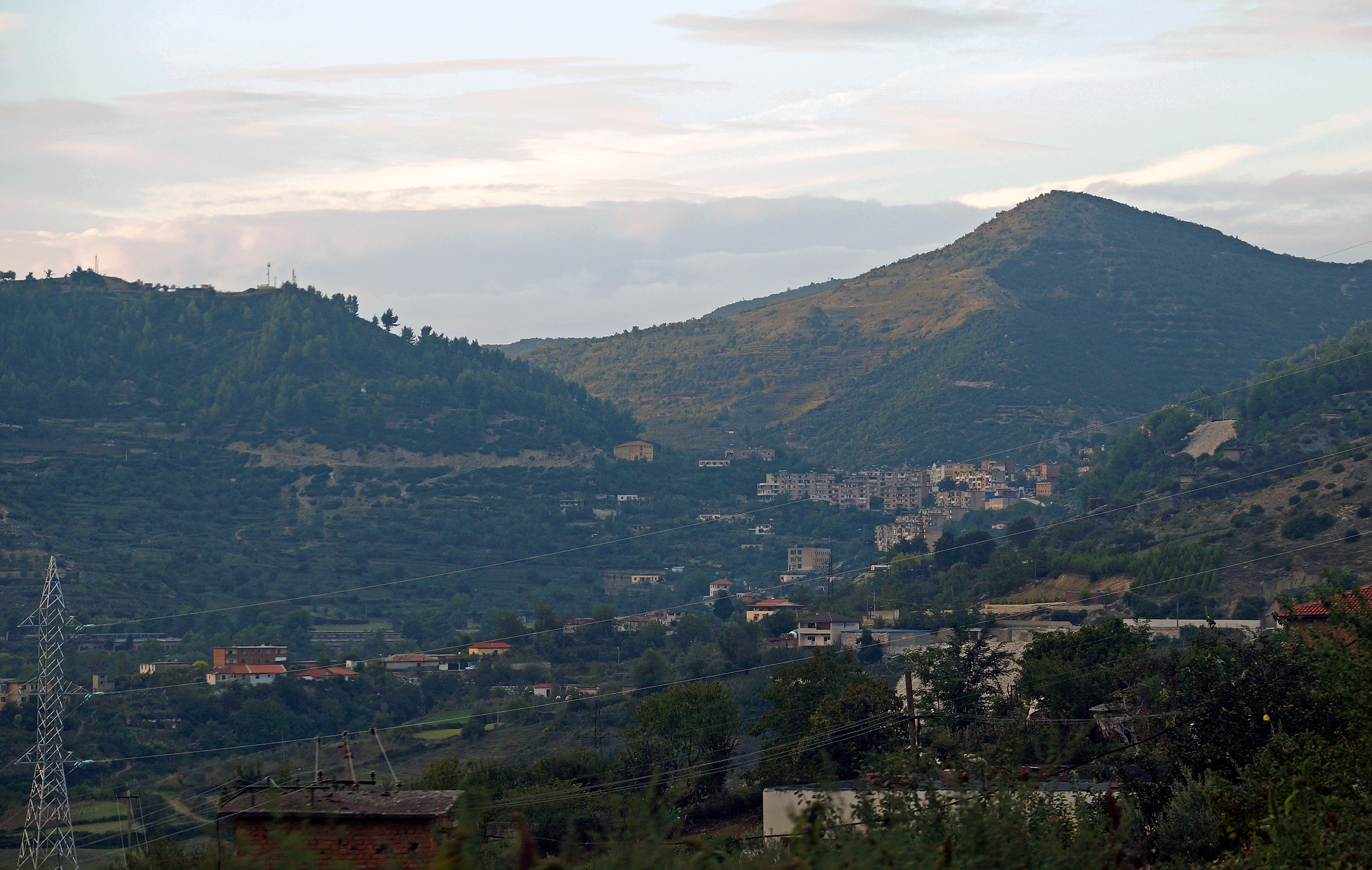

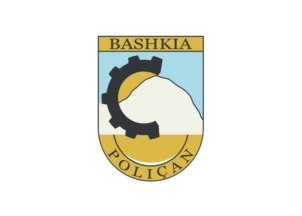
- Flag Emblem

- Location within Albania
- Coordinates: 40°36′44″N 20°5′53″E
- Country: Albania
- County: Berat

Government
  - Mayor: Adriatik Zotkaj (PS)

Area
  - Municipality: 272.20 km^{2} (105.10 sq mi)
- Elevation: 256 m (840 ft)

Population (2011)
  - Municipality: 10,953
  - Municipality density: 40.239/km^{2} (104.22/sq mi)
  - Administrative unit: 4,318
- Time zone: UTC+1 (CET)
  - Summer (DST): UTC+2 (CEST)
- Postal Code: 5403-5404
- Area Code: (0)368
- Website: www.polican.gov.al

Poliçan (Albanian definite form: Poliçani) is a city and a municipality situated in south-central Albania. It was formed at the 2015 local government reform by the merger of the former municipalities Poliçan, Tërpan and Vërtop, that became municipal units. The seat of the municipality is the town Poliçan. The total population is 10,953 (2011 census), in a total area of 272.20 km^{2}. The population of the former municipality at the 2011 census was 4,318. Historically, Polican has been part of Berat County except from 1978 to 1991 when city was made part of Skrapar due to political pressure from the regime at that time. It was established as an industrial center.

== Geography ==
The city is situated 256m above sea level, but the proximity with the Osum river maintains a typical Mediterranean climate, with all the four seasons accentuated. Poliçan is surrounded by several hills, said from which the name is derived. Its neighbourhoods include Plirez, Pronovik, Kalluc, Poligon, Lavdar and City center.

== History ==
The city was built in the 1960s by the Communist government with the purpose of creating an industrial town for the production of weapons and munitions.

It was long regarded as a "ghost" town because little was revealed for security reasons about the place and its industrial activities.

== Economy ==
The economy of the town is concentrated in the weapons industry although with the fall of the communist regime in 1990 it caused production to collapse. The industrial sector is also active through a small factory for the production of beer.

Agricultural activities include the production of wheat, maize, beans and vegetables.

In the surrounding hills olives, chestnuts, nuts, figs, cherries and grapes are also cultivated. Grapes are mainly produced for raki. There is also a greenhouse of 0.5 km^{2}.

== Notable people ==
Below are notable personalities born in Poliçan or that spent most of their lives in Poliçan:

- Aleksandër Kuro, football player
