= Vlorë District =

Defunct (2000) Albanian administrative area

- Former district
- Coordinates: 40°21′N 19°37′E
- Country: Albania
- Dissolved: 2000
- Seat: Vlorë

Area
  - Total: 1,609 km^{2} (621 sq mi)

Population (2001)
  - Total: 147,267
  - Density: 91.53/km^{2} (237.1/sq mi)
- Time zone: UTC+1 (CET)
  - Summer (DST): UTC+2 (CEST)

Vlorë District (Albanian: Rrethi i Vlorës) was one of the 36 districts of Albania, which were dissolved in July 2000 and replaced by 12 newly created counties. It had a population of 147,267 in 2001, and an area of 1,609 km^{2} (621 sq mi). It is in the south-west of the country, and its capital was the city of Vlorë. Its territory is now part of Vlorë County: the municipalities of Vlorë, Selenicë and Himara (partly). Its population included a Greek minority.

== Administrative divisions ==
The district consisted of the following municipalities:

- Armen
- Brataj
- Himara
- Kotë
- Novoselë
- Orikum
- Qendër Vlorë
- Selenicë
- Sevaster
- Shushicë
- Vllahinë
- Vlorë
- Vranisht

Other places in this district included Dhërmi, Palasë, Nartë and Kocul.

Vlorë is the closest point of the Albanian coast to the Italian Peninsula.
