= Peqin District =

Defunct (2000) Albanian administrative area

Peqin District Rrethi i Peqinit
- Former district
- Coordinates: 41°3′N 19°47′E
- Country: Albania
- Dissolved: 2000
- Seat: Peqin

Area
  - Total: 191 km^{2} (74 sq mi)

Population (2001)
  - Total: 32,920
  - Density: 172/km^{2} (446/sq mi)
- Time zone: UTC+1 (CET)
  - Summer (DST): UTC+2 (CEST)

Peqin District' (Albanian: Rrethi i Peqinit) was one of the 36 districts of Albania, which were dissolved in July 2000 and replaced by 12 newly created counties. It had a population of 32,920 in 2001, and an area of 191 km^{2} (74 sq mi). It is in the centre of the country, and its capital was the town of Peqin. The area of the former district is coextensive with the present municipality of Peqin, which is part of Elbasan County.

There are two historical structures that are a reminder to the antiquity of the District of Peqin (which is the modern name of the district). First is the Via Egnatia, which passes through the middle of the district where its capital Peqin is located. Second is the castle (Castle Klaudiana) of the district also located at the center Peqin. As for the landscape of the capital, it is located in the valley of the river Shkumbin which has a wide base and runs through Elbasan County emptying into the Adriatic Sea near Divjakë (Fier County).

== Administrative divisions ==
The district consisted of the following municipalities:

- Gjoçaj
- Karinë
- Pajovë
- **Peqin**
- Përparim
- Shezë

Note: - urban municipalities in bold
