= Kakrukë =

- Village
- Location within Albania
- Coordinates: 40°32′25″N 20°8′2″E
- Country: Albania
- County: Berat
- Municipality: Skrapar
- Administrative unit: Bogovë
- Time zone: UTC+1 (CET)
  - Summer (DST): UTC+2 (CEST)

Kakrukë is a village in the former municipality of Bogovë in Berat County, Albania. At the 2015 local government reform it became part of the municipality Skrapar. The village lies several miles north of the border with Gjirokaster County on the Osum River. It is connected by road to Poliçan in the north and the district capital of Çorovodë in the south. The village was visited by President Sali Berisha in 1996.
