= Novaj =

- Village
- Location within Albania
- Coordinates: 40°35′N 20°9′E
- Country: Albania
- County: Berat
- Municipality: Skrapar
- Administrative unit: Bogovë
- Time zone: UTC+1 (CET)
  - Summer (DST): UTC+2 (CEST)

Novaj is a village in the former municipality of Bogovë in Berat County, Albania. At the 2015 local government reform, it became part of the municipality Skrapar.

== Attractions ==
Novaj has a relic that is considered by local Bektashis to be the footprint of Abbas ibn Ali.
