= Vendreshë e Vogël =

- Village
- Location within Albania
- Coordinates: 40.52°N 20.07°E
- Country: Albania
- County: Berat
- Municipality: Skrapar
- Administrative unit: Vendreshë
- Time zone: UTC+1 (CET)
  - Summer (DST): UTC+2 (CEST)

Vendreshë e Vogël is a village in the former municipality of Vendreshë in Berat County, Albania. At the 2015 local government reform it became part of the municipality Skrapar. The closest major cities include Tirana, Skopje, Thessaloniki and Pristina.
