= Luadh =

- Village
- Location within Albania
- Coordinates: 40°39′10″N 20°11′30″E
- Country: Albania
- County: Berat
- Municipality: Skrapar
- Administrative unit: Zhepë
- Time zone: UTC+1 (CET)
  - Summer (DST): UTC+2 (CEST)

Luadh is a village in the former municipality of Zhepë in Berat County, Albania. At the 2015 local government reform it became part of the municipality Skrapar.
