= Blezënckë =

- Village
- Location within Albania
- Coordinates: 40°27′N 20°16′E
- Country: Albania
- County: Berat
- Municipality: Skrapar
- Administrative unit: Çepan
- Time zone: UTC+1 (CET)
  - Summer (DST): UTC+2 (CEST)

Blezënckë is a village in the former municipality of Çepan in Berat County, Albania. At the 2015 local government reform it became part of the municipality Skrapar.

Blezënckë is close to the Osum River, which is east of the village. It has been considered for ecotourism development.
