= UFO sightings in Albania =

List of alleged UFO sightings

This is a list of alleged sightings of unidentified flying objects or UFOs in Albania.

== 1907 ==
The first documentation of a UFO encounter in Albania is found in the diary of Mihal Grameno. Grameno was a journalist, writer, and activist who fought alongside the members of Çerçiz Topulli's guerrilla band during the years 1907–1908. In his book The Albanian Uprising, Grameno recounts his memories of the guerillas' journey through the mountains, including a strange incident: "One night, while the fighters of Çerçiz were stationed at the top of a high mountain, a shiny object flew in front of us, stood suspended in the air for several minutes, and then disappeared."

== 8 July 1933 ==
In 1933, a list of abnormal reports was addressed to the Prefecture of Milan, mentioning an unusual incident that occurred on 8 July 1933 in the sky of Vlorë. It was reported that two airplanes changed direction in a manner inconsistent with aerial technology of the time.

== 18 July 1947 ==
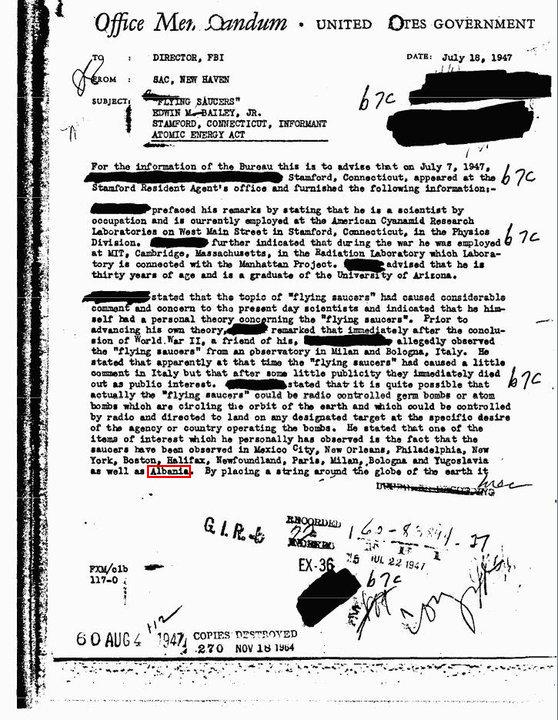
An FBI report talking about flying saucers.

An FBI report from 18 July 1947 states that unidentified flying objects (UFOs), also known as "saucers", were observed in various locations around the world, including Mexico City, New Orleans, Philadelphia, New York, Boston, Halifax, Newfoundland, Paris, Milan, Bologna, Yugoslavia, and Albania.

== 1960s ==
The Tomorr Mountain UFO incident refers to an alleged unidentified flying object encounter in the early 1960s near Mount Tomorr in Skrapar, Albania, during the communist regime. A squadron of five MiG-19 fighter jets from Kuçova Military Airport was scrambled to intercept a glittering, spherical object that dazzled pilots and disrupted instruments, causing temporary blindness and communication loss. The lead pilot, Veiz Lame from Skrapar, pursued the object and, after receiving orders to open fire, his aircraft crashed with a precise, clean cut behind the cockpit. It was reported that the fighter jet had been severed, as though by a very sharp tool, leaving the cabin intact while the rest of the plane was damaged. Accounts vary on the pilot's fate, with some stating he survived in the cabin and others claiming he died there. Initial suspicions of a NATO incursion from Greece were dismissed after investigations by Albanian State Security (Sigurimi i Shtetit), which documented the event in top-secret files reported to Central Committee Secretary Hysni Kapo and Gogo Nushi. The incident is part of broader UFO reports in the region, including luminous circular objects sighted by locals, communists, and officials in areas like Pirogoshi Canyon and Cukë, often linked to ancient folklore or archaeological anomalies, as recounted by writer and lawyer Ilir Malindi and novelist Ben Shehu.

== January 1963 ==
In January 1963, residents of the village of Kallamishtëz in the Kurvelesh area reported seeing a bright object in the sky. Albanian authorities attempted to calm the population by telling them that what they had seen was not a UFO, but rather a new model of a jet plane being used by the Albanian Air Force.

== 1969 ==
Ilir Malindi, a lawyer who was born in Skrapar, marked in his memoirs that he personally experienced an incident in the Pirogoshi Canyon, above Çorovodë, in 1969. After exploring the Pirogoshi Cave system and upon his return to the city, he was surprised by two luminous objects that were circular in shape and reflected heavily in the depths of the Pirogoshi Canyon. They continued to illuminate for a minute, writes Malindi in his memoirs, and then abruptly broke away, disappearing rapidly into the sky. Many people in the area and in Çorovodë had also seen them, and there was extensive discussion at that time. A common hypothesis was that it was a NATO missile.

== 1 August 1990 ==
An eyewitness from Tirana recounted an anomalous event that happened to him during the summer of 1990 while serving in the military in Shkodër:

"In the summer of 1990, I was serving my mandatory military service in the village of Bardhaj in Shkodër. My military unit was responsible for anti-aircraft defense. We were all trained to identify different types of planes during the day and night, and our unit had military technology tools that could distinguish planes at close and far distances. On the night of August 1st, I was on duty. At around 2:30 in the morning, a series of lights (100–150) arranged in a strange pattern, resembling the shape of a diamond and about 20 meters in size, appeared in the sky at high speed with very little noise, similar to the sound of a flock of birds. It was not an airplane or any other flying object that we knew of. Moreover, it had a very high speed and made very little noise."

— Gëzim Dapi, environmental engineer

Gëzim reported this to the central operator of the battalion at the time. There, he learned that he was not alone in sighting the phenomenon:

"Five other soldiers from different anti-aircraft units who were on duty at that time had reported the same thing to me. The next day, officers asked us about it, but no city or radar in Albania had identified it, except for us soldiers who saw it with our own eyes. It was not given much importance then because it was just after the opening of embassies, and other issues were the order of the day. Two months later, the newspaper Zëri i Rinisë published this event, but not in detail."

— Gëzim Dapi

== 12 July 1993 ==
13 July 1993 article from Koha Jonë newspaper talking about the 1993 Cërrik UFO incident and 1963 Kallamishtëz UFO incident.

Around 8:00 pm, a glowing object appeared in the sky of Cërrik, Elbasan. According to eyewitness accounts, the illuminated object made sudden and quick movements. The news that a UFO was flying overhead quickly spread throughout the town. Law enforcement was notified, and they tried to limit the spread of panic among the population. The glowing object disappeared from the sky around 10:00 pm, according to eyewitness accounts.

== 4 May 2006 ==
One particularly well-known case occurred in the village of Roskovec. Three eyewitnesses, an adult woman and two children, reported an unidentified object having landed in their town. Three double-banded black circles in the asphalt were photographed by Alim Çepele and were considered evidence that an object had touched down. According to the witnesses, the event occurred on a clear day; however, sudden anomalous environmental changes were observed, seemingly correlating with the object's presence. A dimming of ambient light and the appearance of a mist were both noted, as though rain were about to fall. A strong and cold wind was also described, and the branches of the trees were allegedly bent down. When the object departed, most of the environmental anomalies ceased. Sherife Kola, one of the local residents present at the time, only witnessed anomalous effects, but not the object itself. However, one of the children present, a 10-year-old named Mario Çela, reported having seen the UFO directly. According to him, the object had an oval, disclike shape. It had a gray coloration, as well as a thin blue line. It remained on the ground for only about 4–5 seconds. After the event, Alim Çepele talked to the boy and reported that he was in a state of shock for three months, not wanting to leave his house. Witnesses say the object came from the northwest, then lifted off, rotated, and departed the same way it came. A significant number of residents claim to have seen the marks left on the asphalt, and they reported that the petals of roses were burned when they were placed on the spot where the object had landed. The event occurred on 4 May around 7:00 pm. According to the residents' recollection, the event took place specifically at coordinates 40.7379603°N 19.6988726°E.

== 6 March 2007 ==
On the evening of 6 March 2007, Coast Guard officer Admir Jemishaj was on duty with his commander. At around 7:15 pm, they reported seeing an unmoving object in the sky. The object was visible to the naked eye, and they later saw it even more clearly through binoculars. The object suddenly appeared over the coastal area of Seman in Fier and remained motionless in space for 20 minutes. The officers reported that it had a dazzling shine, changed colors, and had a disc-like shape, which they saw both with the naked eye and through binoculars:

"We were on duty when we saw a completely unique object. It stayed on the horizon with the sea at one mile high. Its colors changed from green to blue and red. For a few minutes, it was only red or blue. It was something scary, but at the same time beautiful."

— Admir Jemishaj, Coast Guard officer

== 24 December 2008 ==
On Christmas Eve in 2008, four hunters from Elbasan reported that they had encountered a flying disc at around 8:30 pm. The hunting party had set out for the village of Vidhas in the Municipality of Paprit, on the border of the district of Peqin. After leaving the center of the municipality, about 7 kilometres (4.3 mi) away, they took a forest road. After driving about 15 kilometres (9.3 mi), they were surprised when their off-road vehicle's cabin shook from above, and the engine died. One of the witnesses, Muharrem Kaçuli, explained what occurred next: "We were blinded by a bright blue light and a vertical red light. For a moment, I felt like police cars were chasing us from behind." According to him, his 25-year-old son wanted to shoot at the shining object with his shotgun, but his father prevented this course of action.

== 21 July 2009 ==
In the early hours of 21 July 2009, an unidentified object was seen in Vlorë in the area behind Karaburun, specifically in a quiet and uninhabited area called Gjiri i Dafinës. This flying object was seen by some fishermen who had set out in their boat the evening prior. The object had the shape of a satellite and a diameter of about 3 metres (9.8 ft):

"I was pulling the fishing nets when a large object passed over our heads, stayed only 5 seconds, and immediately disappeared, moving away quickly. The object emitted a trail of smoke, and its color was gray to white... even in these moments, I feel shocked, impossible. It really looked like a flying saucer."

— Shpëtim Alushaj, one of the fishermen

== 7 August 2010 ==
A woman alleged that she witnessed anomalous lights over Tirana:

"It was 01:26 AM, and my son spotted three strange objects shining in the sky. He was taken aback, quickly grabbed the camera and started recording them. Even while he was recording, his hands were shaking from the overwhelming emotions he was feeling. He informed me and my daughter, and we went to see for ourselves. At that moment, I didn't think twice about what they were and enjoyed the two minutes. All three objects were orange, spherical in shape, and detached. … Initially, the objects appeared to be close to us, but as time passed, they rose higher. The first object broke away at immense speed towards the northwest. It was so fast that I saw the light disappear in the blink of an eye. The other two objects vanished instantly."

— Rezmie Lulo

The Albanian Army refused to comment on the incident to reporters.

Ilirian Ciko, the Operational Director of the National Air Traffic Agency, stated that there were no airplane departures or landings at Tirana International Airport during that time, and only four planes at high altitudes were flying overhead.

Petrit Sulaj, Director of the Civil Aviation Authority, confirmed that they had received "no official or unofficial information about the mentioned objects from aviation companies or agencies that are part of the air navigation systems."

The witness continued:

"It is very likely that they were UFOs. The scientific world has discussed the possibility of their existence as reality or perhaps a figment of the human mind. With what I saw, I was faced with the truth that they do indeed exist."

— Rezmie Lulo

Lulo was not the only witness to this phenomenon, but she was one of the few who agreed to give a statement to reporters.

== See also ==
- UFO sightings in Kosovo
- List of reported UFO sightings
