= Dyrmish =

- Village
- Location within Albania
- Coordinates: 40°26′N 20°19′E
- Country: Albania
- County: Berat
- Municipality: Skrapar
- Administrative unit: Potom
- Time zone: UTC+1 (CET)
  - Summer (DST): UTC+2 (CEST)

Dyrmish is a village in the former municipality of Potom in Berat County, Albania. At the 2015 local government reform it became part of the municipality Skrapar.
