= Orizaj =

Orizaj may refer to:

- Orizaj, Berat, a village in the municipality of Berat, Berat County, Albania
- Orizaj, Skrapar, a village in the municipality of Skrapar, Berat County, Albania
