= Xhafer Sylejmani =

Albanian physician and politician

Xhafer Sylejmani Dr

Mayor of Tetovo under the Kingdom of Albania
- In office May 1941 – 23 November 1943
- Succeeded by: Shaip Kamberi

Kingdom of Yugoslavia Senator from Vardar Banovina
- In office 12 November 1939 – 6 April 1941
- Succeeded by: Position Dissolved

Kingdom of Yugoslavia Senator from Vardar Banovina
- In office 3 January 1932 – 11 November 1939
- Preceded by: Position Established

Kingdom of Yugoslavia Member of the Parliament from Vardar Banovina
- In office 12 September 1927 – 6 January 1929

Personal details
- Born: 14 March 1879 Sevran, Skrapar, Janina vilayet, Ottoman Empire
- Died: 17 November 1953 (aged 75) Tetovo, FPR Yugoslavia (now North Macedonia)
- Education: Istanbul University; Sorbonne University
- Occupation: Medical Doctor; Politician

Xhafer Sylejmani (1879–1953) was an Albanian doctor and the mayor of Tetovo under the Italian protectorate of Albania.

== Early life and education ==
Sylejmani was born in the Përmet, Albania. After completing high school in Salonika, Sylejmani studied medical science at Istanbul University.

Sylejmani started his 2-year internship in Janina (Present day Ioannina), where he met his future wife, Safija.

== Political career ==
In 1926, Sylejmani's eldest son, Reshat, died at the age of 16.

== Kingdom of Albania ==
In 1941, the Axis forces occupied Yugoslavia and Tetovo came under the influence of the Kingdom of Albania. In May 1941, he was appointed as the mayor of Tetovo. During his tenure, he opened Albanian language schools.

== Later life and death ==
After the end of the Second World War, Sylejmani was sentenced to 6 years in Idrizovo, a political prison.

== Legacy ==
Under the Ministry of Culture in North Macedonia, Xhafer Sylemani's former house is heritage listed.
