= Rehov (disambiguation) =

Rehov is a settlement in northern Israel.

Rehov may also refer to:

- Tel Rehov, site of the ancient city of Rehov in the Jordan Valley, Israel
- Tel Kabri, an ancient mound in Israel; the Canaanite (Bronze Age) city there was possibly called Rehov
- Pierre Rehov, French–Israeli documentary filmmaker, director and novelist

== See also ==
- Rehovë (disambiguation), several villages in Albania
