= Rehovë =

Rehovë may refer to the following places in Albania:

- Rehovë, Poliçan, a village in the municipality of Poliçan, Berat County
- Rehovë, Skrapar, a village in the municipality of Skrapar, Berat County
- Rehovë, Kolonjë, a village in the municipality of Kolonjë, Korçë County
- Rehovë, Korçë, a village in the municipality of Korçë, Korçë County
