= Helmës =

Helmës may refer to the following places in Albania:

- Helmës, Berat, a village in the municipality of Skrapar, Berat County
- Helmës, Korçë, a village in the municipality of Kolonjë, Korçë County
- Helmas, a village in the municipality of Kavajë, Tirana County
