= Skrapar Castle =

Cultural heritage monument of Albania

Skrapar Castle, also known as Gjenivizi Castle, is a medieval castle located on a large hill in southwest of Çorovodë.
