= Posten =

Posten in the three main Nordic languages means 'The Post' and may refer to any of the Swedish, Norwegian, Danish or Finnish state postal companies:

- Posten AB, the Swedish postal service
- Posten Norge, the Norwegian postal service
- Post Danmark, the Danish postal service, commonly referred to as just 'Posten'
- Posten (Finland), the Swedish name of the Finnish postal service
- Posten på Åland, the postal service of the autonomous province Åland of Finland
- The Decorah Posten, a notable Norwegian international newspaper that was published in Iowa

== Other uses ==
- Posten, Albania, a village in Berat County, Albania
