= Floq =

Floq may refer to

- Floq (crater), a crater on Mars
- Floq, Berat, a village in the municipality of Skrapar, Berat County, Albania
- Floq, Cërrik, a village in the municipality of Cërrik, Elbasan County, Albania
- Floq, Librazhd, a village in the municipality of Librazhd, Elbasan County, Albania
- Floq, Fier, a village in the municipality of Fier, Fier County, Albania
- Floq, Korçë, a village in the municipality of Korçë, Korçë County, Albania
