= Pirogoshi Cave =

Cave in southern Albania

- IUCN category III (natural monument or feature)
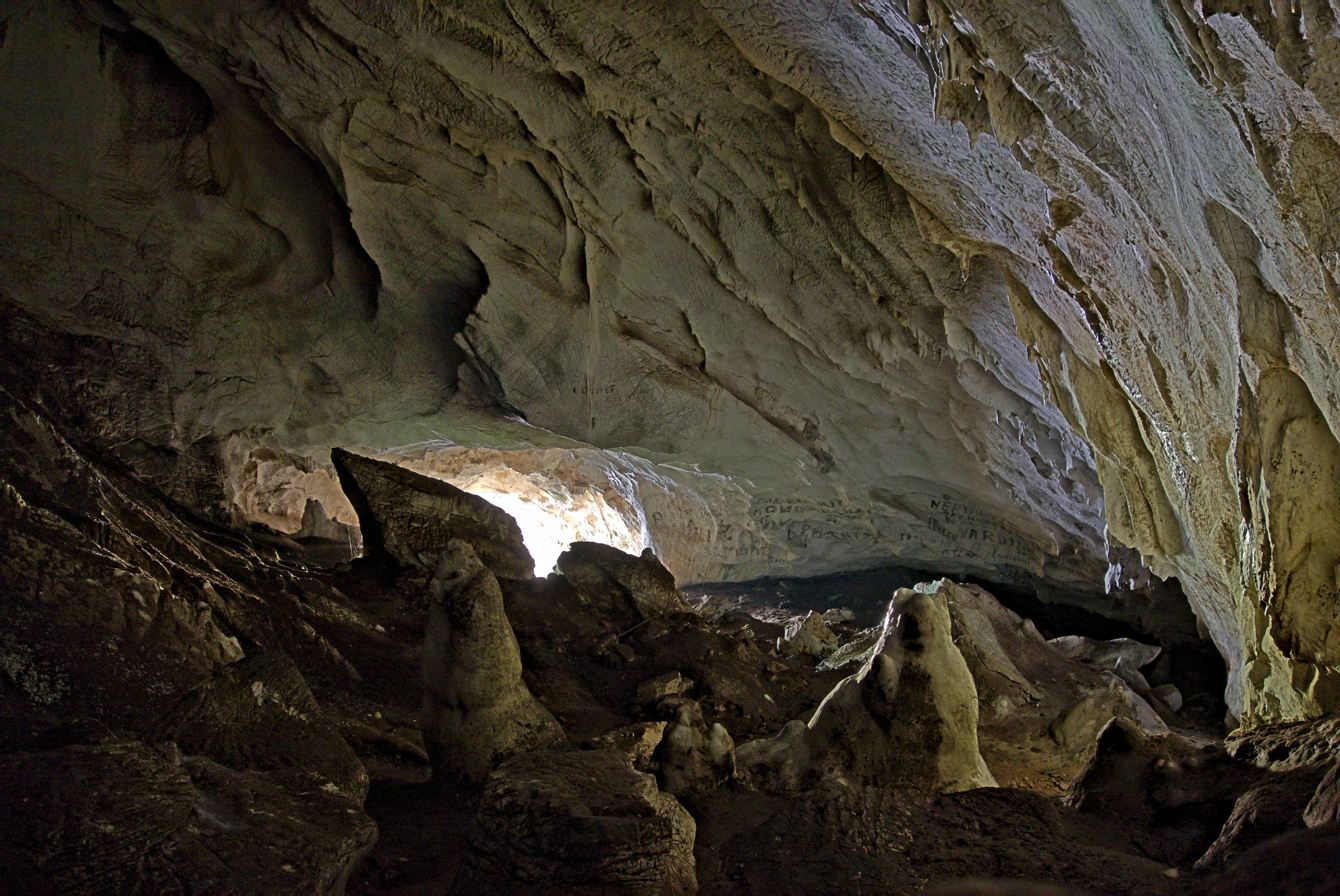
- Pirogoshi Cave
- Interactive map of Pirogoshi Cave
- Location: Berat County
- Nearest city: Çorovodë
- Coordinates: 40°31′24″N 20°15′29″E
- Designation: Natural Monument
- Governing body: Ministry of Environment

Pirogoshi Cave is a cave in Albania. It is 1500m long and is located near Çorovodë, Radesh village, Skrapar.

== See also ==
- Geography of Albania
- Protected areas of Albania
