= Potom =

- Administrative unit
- Location within Albania
- Coordinates: 40°29′N 20°22′E
- Country: Albania
- County: Berat
- Municipality: Skrapar

Population (2011)
  - Administrative unit: 897
- Time zone: UTC+1 (CET)
  - Summer (DST): UTC+2 (CEST)

Potom is a village and a former municipality in Berat County, central Albania. At the 2015 local government reform it became a subdivision of the municipality Skrapar. The population at the 2011 census was 897.

== Localities ==
The municipal unit Potom consists of the following villages:

- Backë
- Dyrmish
- Gërmenj
- Gjergjovë
- Helmës
- Koprënckë
- Melskë
- Nikollarë
- Potom
- Qafë
- Staraveckë
- Visockë
