= Villages of Berat County =

The Berat County in central Albania is subdivided into 5 municipalities. These municipalities contain 246 towns and villages:
