= Vendreshë =

- Administrative unit
- Location within Albania
- Coordinates: 40°30′N 20°8′E
- Country: Albania
- County: Berat
- Municipality: Skrapar

Population (2011)
  - Administrative unit: 984
- Time zone: UTC+1 (CET)
  - Summer (DST): UTC+2 (CEST)

Vendreshë is a former municipality in Berat County, central Albania. At the 2015 local government reform it became a subdivision of the municipality Skrapar. The population at the 2011 census was 984.
