= Bogovë =

- Administrative unit
- Location within Albania
- Coordinates: 40°34′N 20°9′E
- Country: Albania
- County: Berat
- Municipality: Skrapar
  - Administrative unit: 86.36 km^{2} (33.34 sq mi)

Population (2023)
  - Administrative unit: 932
  - Administrative unit density: 10.8/km^{2} (28.0/sq mi)
- Time zone: UTC+1 (CET)
  - Summer (DST): UTC+2 (CEST)

Bogovë is a village and a former municipality in Berat County, central Albania. At the 2015 local government reform it became a subdivision of the municipality Skrapar. The population as of the 2023 census is 932.

Historical population
Year	Pop.	±%
1989	3,263	—
2001	1,899	−41.8%
2011	1,098	−42.2%
2023	932	−15.1%

The name originates from the Slavic word for Gods (Bogove).
