= Çorovodë =

- Administrative unit
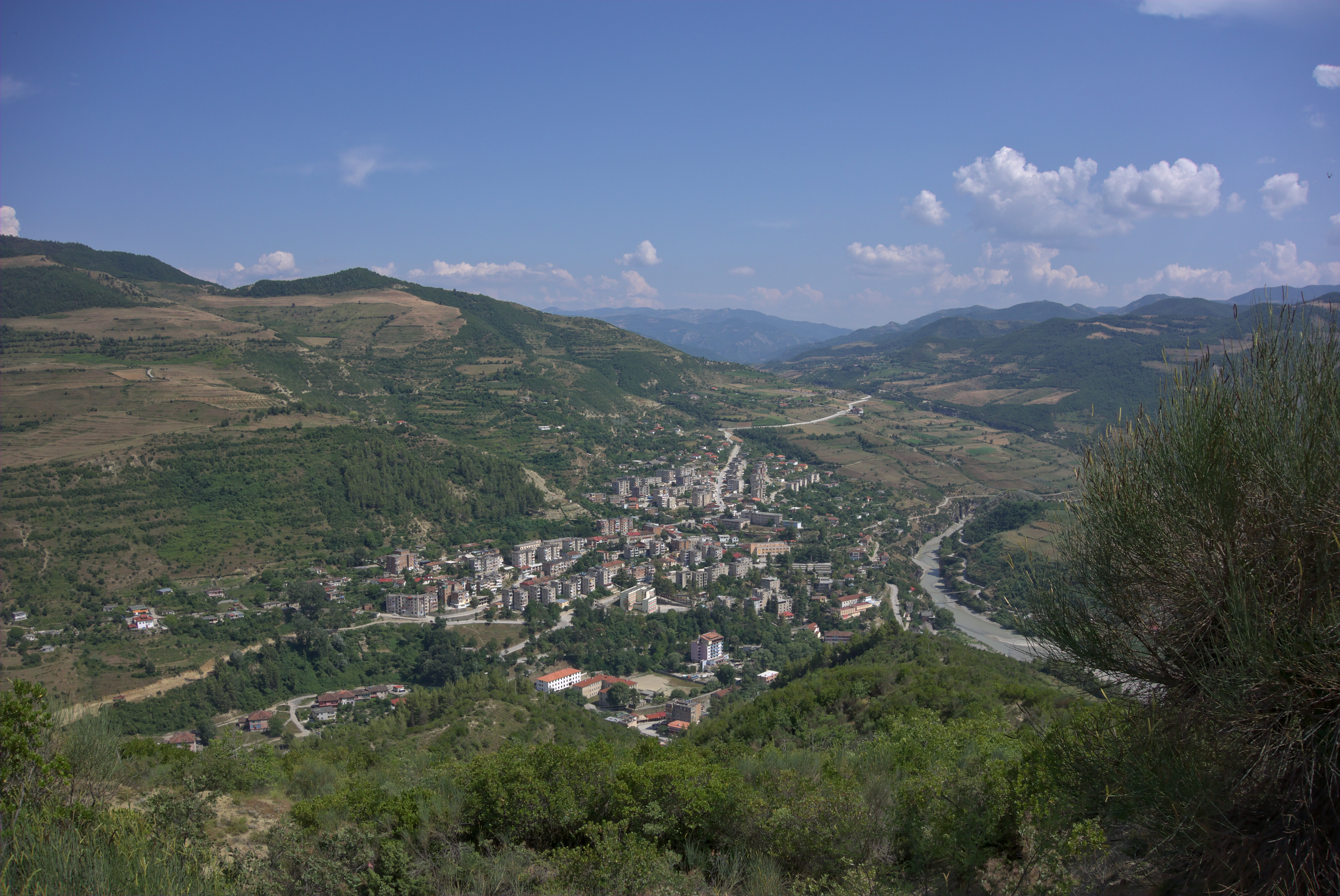
- Çorovodë in the Distance

- Emblem

- Location within Albania
- Coordinates: 40°30′N 20°13′E
- Country: Albania
- County: Berat
- Municipality: Skrapar
  - Administrative unit: 3.67 km^{2} (1.42 sq mi)
- Elevation: 300 m (980 ft)

Population (2023)
  - Administrative unit: 3,918
  - Administrative unit density: 1,070/km^{2} (2,770/sq mi)
- Time zone: UTC+1 (CET)
  - Summer (DST): UTC+2 (CEST)
- Postal Code: 5401-5402
- Area Code: 0312
- Website: http://bashkiacorovode.gov.al

Çorovodë (Albanian definite form: Çorovoda) is a town and a former municipality in Berat County, Albania. At the 2015 local government reform it became a municipal unit and the seat of the municipality Skrapar. It was the seat of the former Skrapar District. The population at the 2023 census was 3,918.

Historical population
Year	Pop.	±%
1955	697	—
1960	1,329	+90.7%
1969	3,300	+148.3%
1979	5,200	+57.6%
1989	7,501	+44.2%
2001	6,755	−9.9%
2011	4,051	−40.0%
2023	3,918	−3.3%

The river Osum passes through the city. Upstream it forms canyons and caves. The river provides opportunities for kayaking and other aquatic sport.

== History ==
The smaller Çorovoda River also flows through the city and mouths into the Osum river. The name of the town derives from the Bulgarian word for "black water". Five kilometers northeast of Çorovodë it formed the Gradec Canyon. In one of its cliffs the presumably biggest cave of Albania named "Pirogosh" is located. Allegedly, two kings, Piro and Goshi, named it. Also of note is the Ottoman-era Kasabashi stone bridge over the Çorovoda river.

During the period of communist rule in Albania, the town was a closed city that had a military airport, as well as other critical war infrastructure.

== Tourism ==
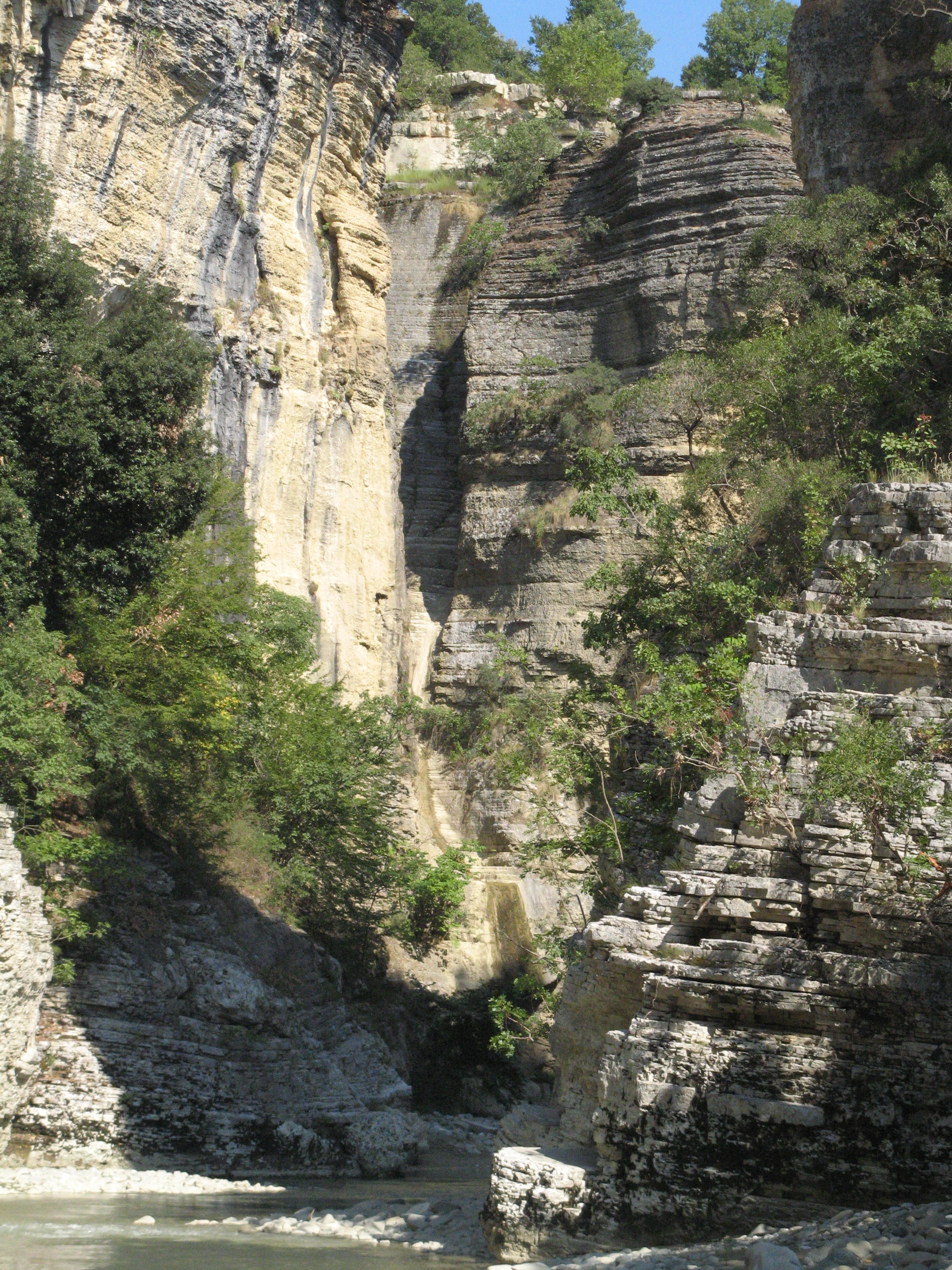
Osum Canyon

Çorovodë is known for activities like rafting and mountain hiking. The Osum river is a river that pass between canyons that makes rafting hard and hosts annual rafting contests and championships. There are many mountains and hikes in the area.

- Bogova Reserve
- Osum Canyon
- Pirogoshi Cave

== Notable people ==
- Xhelal bej Koprencka, modern Albania's founding father
- Ilir Meta (born 1969), Albanian President

== See also ==
- Pirogoshi Cave
- Osum Canyon
