= Gjerbës =

Former municipality of Albania

- Administrative unit
- Location within Albania
- Coordinates: 40°38′N 20°15′E
- Country: Albania
- County: Berat
- Municipality: Skrapar

Population (2011)
  - Administrative unit: 813
- Time zone: UTC+1 (CET)
  - Summer (DST): UTC+2 (CEST)

Gjerbës is a village and a former municipality in Berat County, central Albania. At the 2015 local government reform it became a subdivision of the municipality Skrapar. The population at the 2011 census was 813.
