= Skrapar =

- Municipality
- Gradec Cliffs near Çorovodë

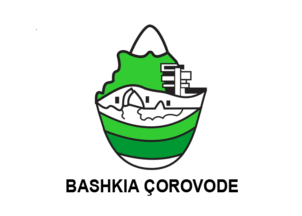
- Flag Emblem

- Location within Albania
- Coordinates: 40°30′N 20°14′E
- Country: Albania
- County: Berat

Government
  - Mayor: Adriatik Mema (PS)

Area
  - Municipality: 832.04 km^{2} (321.25 sq mi)

Population (2023)
  - Municipality: 10,750
  - Municipality density: 12.92/km^{2} (33.46/sq mi)
- Time zone: UTC+1 (CET)
  - Summer (DST): UTC+2 (CEST)
- Postal Code: 5401-5402
- Area Code: (0)312
- Website: bashkiaskrapar.gov.al

Skrapar (Albanian definite form: Skrapari) is a municipality in Berat County, southern Albania. It was created in 2015 by the merger of the former municipalities Bogovë, Çepan, Çorovodë, Gjerbës, Leshnjë, Potom, Qendër Skrapar, Vendreshë and Zhepë. The seat of the municipality is the town Çorovodë. The total population is 12,403 (2011 census), in a total area of 832.04 km^{2}. It covers part of the area of the former Skrapar District, without the town Poliçan.

It is also roughly contiguous with the Albanian "ethnographic region" of Skrapar which is known for its folklore, its raki production, its high rate of those belonging to the Bektashi order and its scenic mountains.

== History ==
The discovery of the cave settlements, graves, mosaics, coins and the ruins of bridges, churches, castles, have extended knowledge and evidence of an ancient human life in the area. Ancient objects are work tools belonging to the Neolithic period. Illyrian-Roman wars, come out through the pen of historians of different times like, Orgesi, Koragu, Gerunti, etc. According to them, the town was established in III century BC and Illyrians served as a fortress area of Skrapar and strategic character defence. The earliest mention of Skrapar seems to be in reference to a fortress called Skreparion, attested in 1336 by the Byzantine chronicle of Emperor John VI Kantakouzenos. During the Ottoman period, the region was known as İskarapar.

== Municipal Council ==
Seat distribution in the Municipal Council

Following the 2023 local elections, the composition of the Council of Skrapar is as follows:

Name	Abbr.	Seats
Socialist Party of Albania; Partia Socialiste e Shqipërisë	PS	8
Together We Win; Bashkë Fitojmë	BF	5
Republican Party of Albania; Partia Republikane e Shqipërisë	PR	1
Social Democratic Party of Albania; Partia Socialdemokrate e Shqipërisë	PSD	1

== Gallery ==
Kasabashi Bridge near Çorovodë

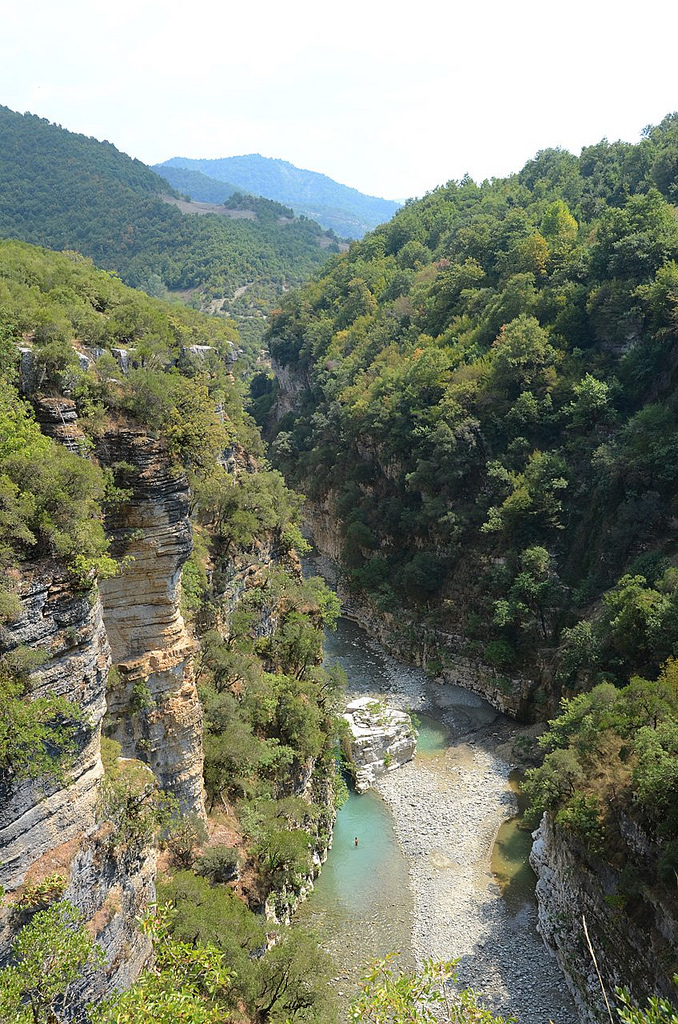
Osum Canyon

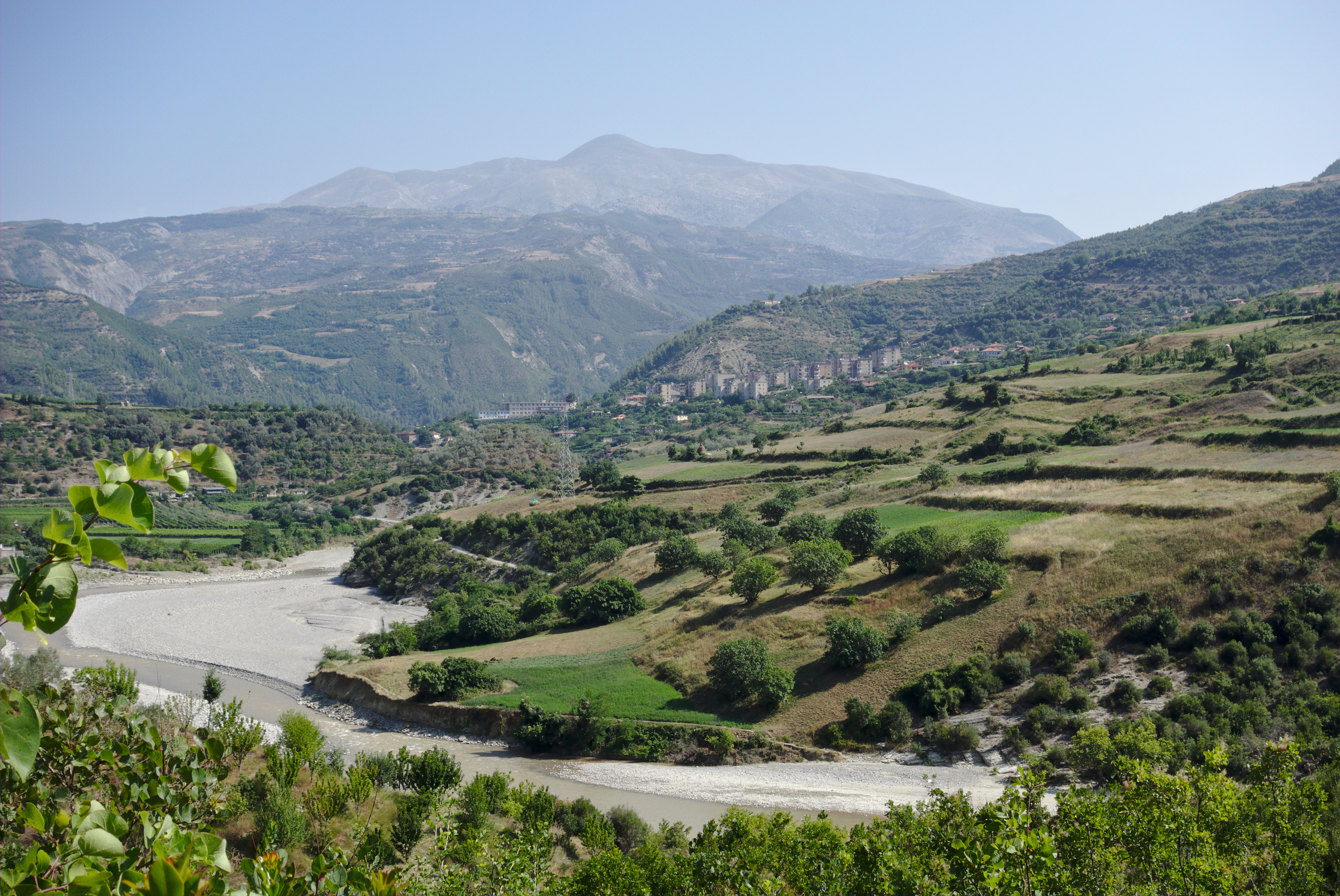
Osum river and Tomorr in the background

== See also ==
- Tomorrica
