= Berat County =

County in southern Albania

Berat County Qarku i Beratit (Albanian)
- County
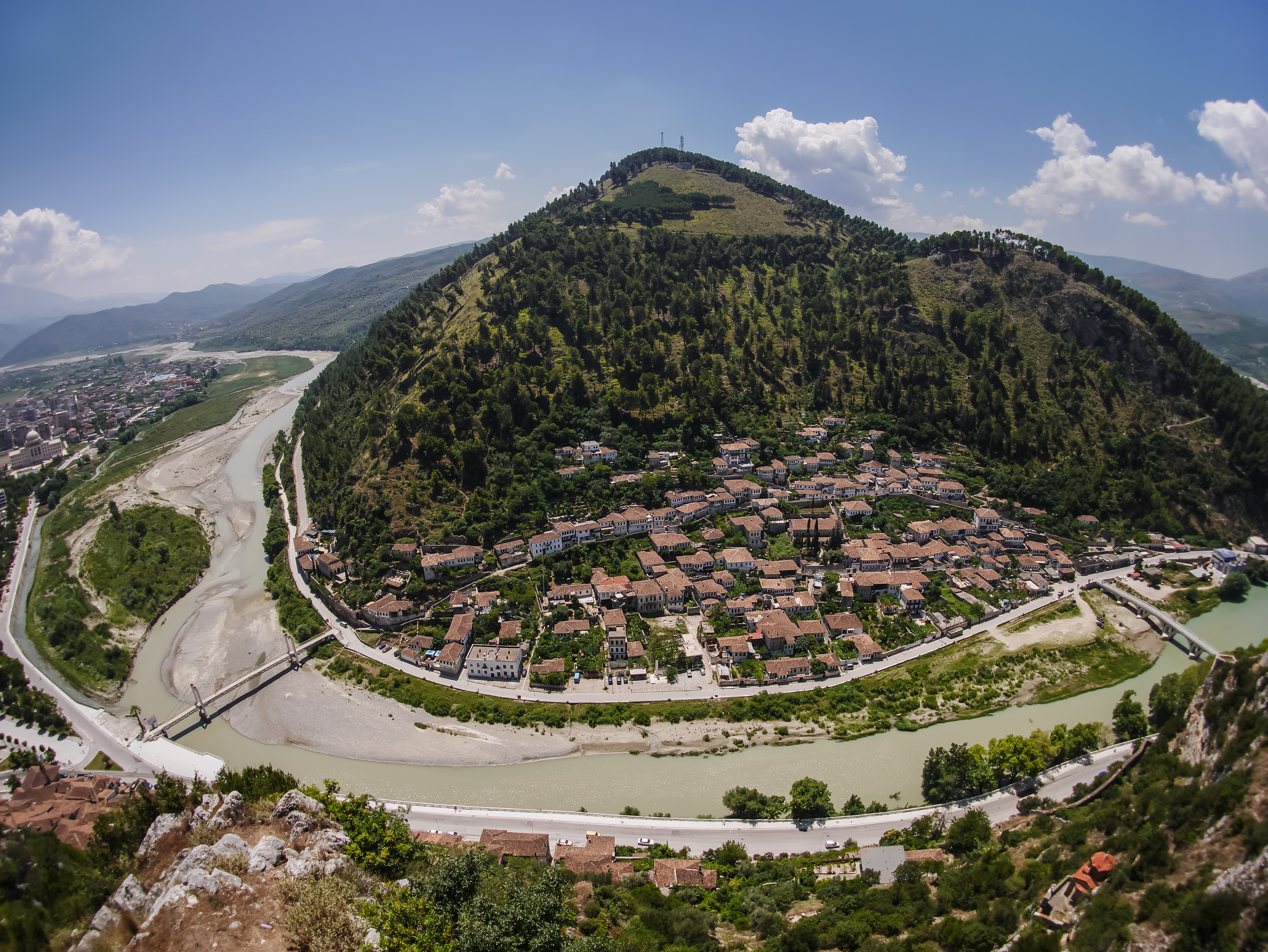
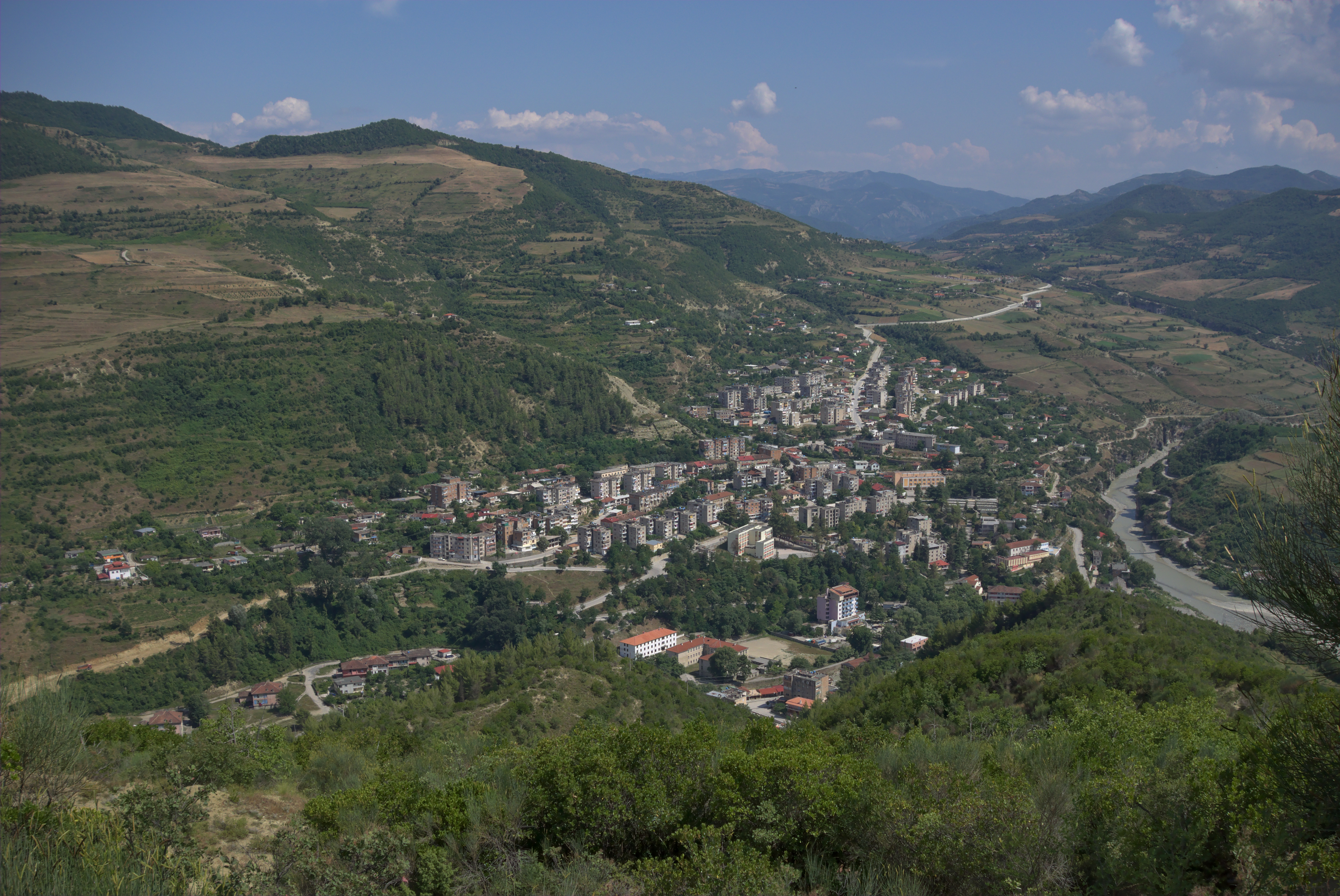
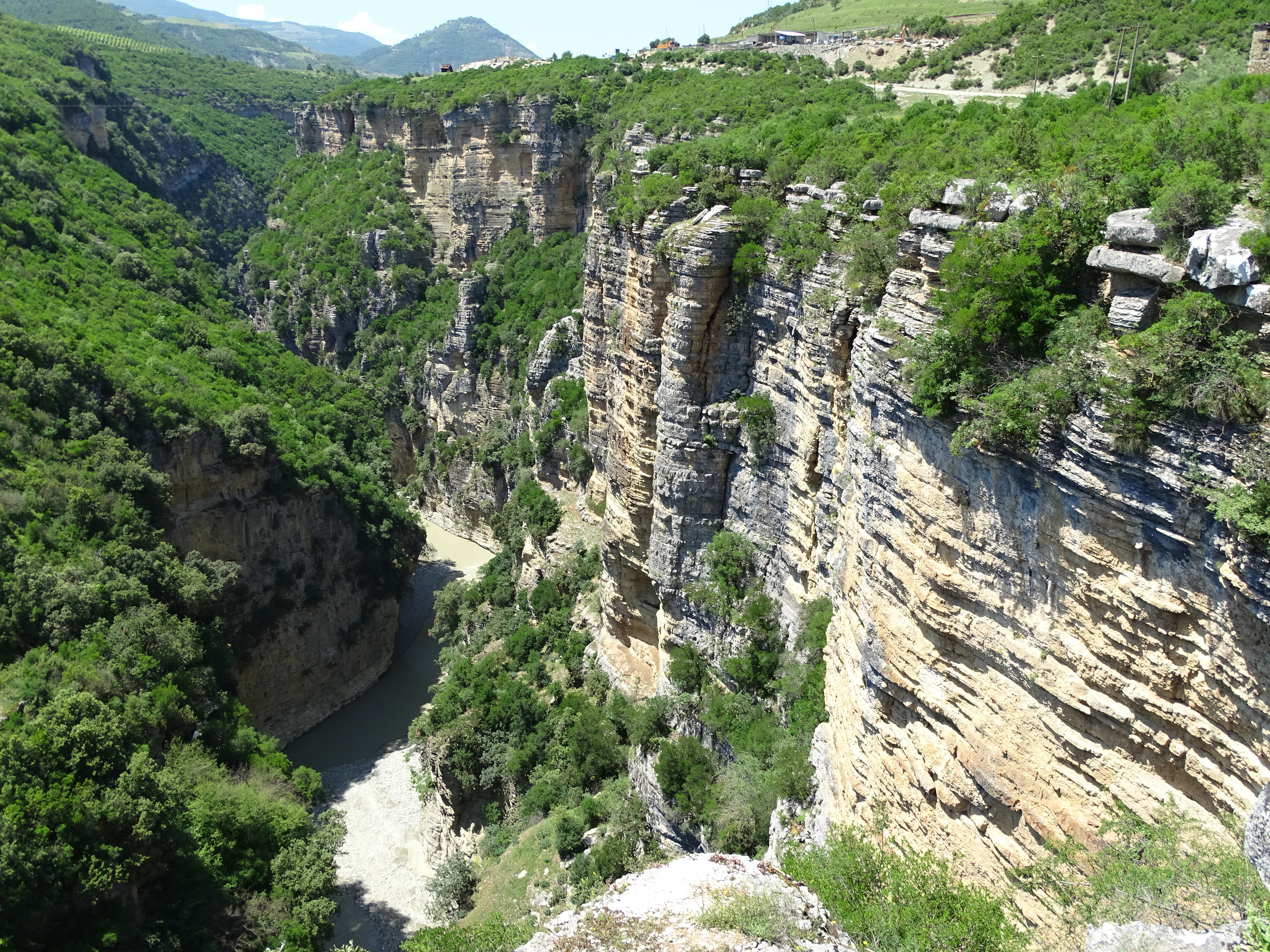
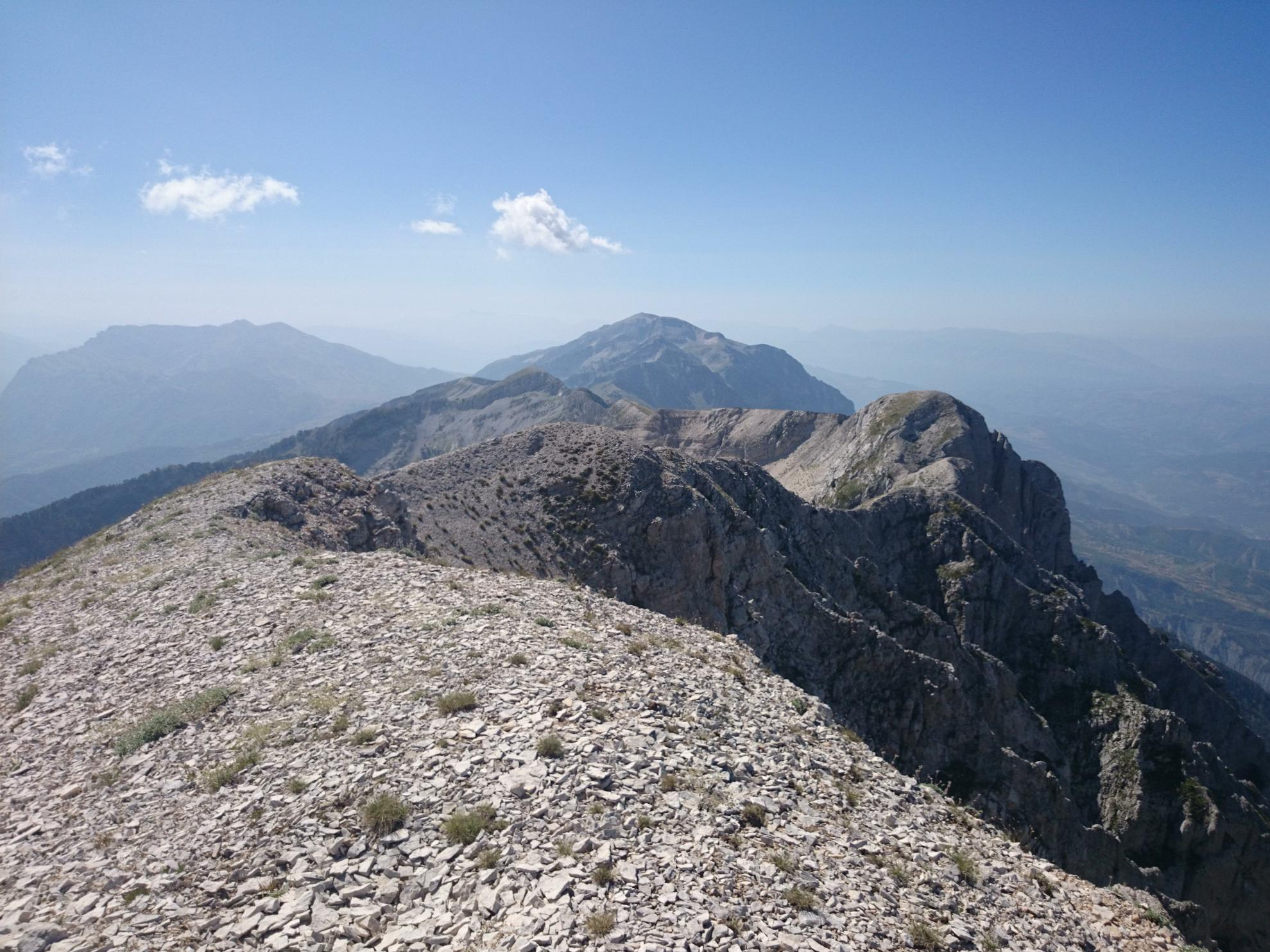
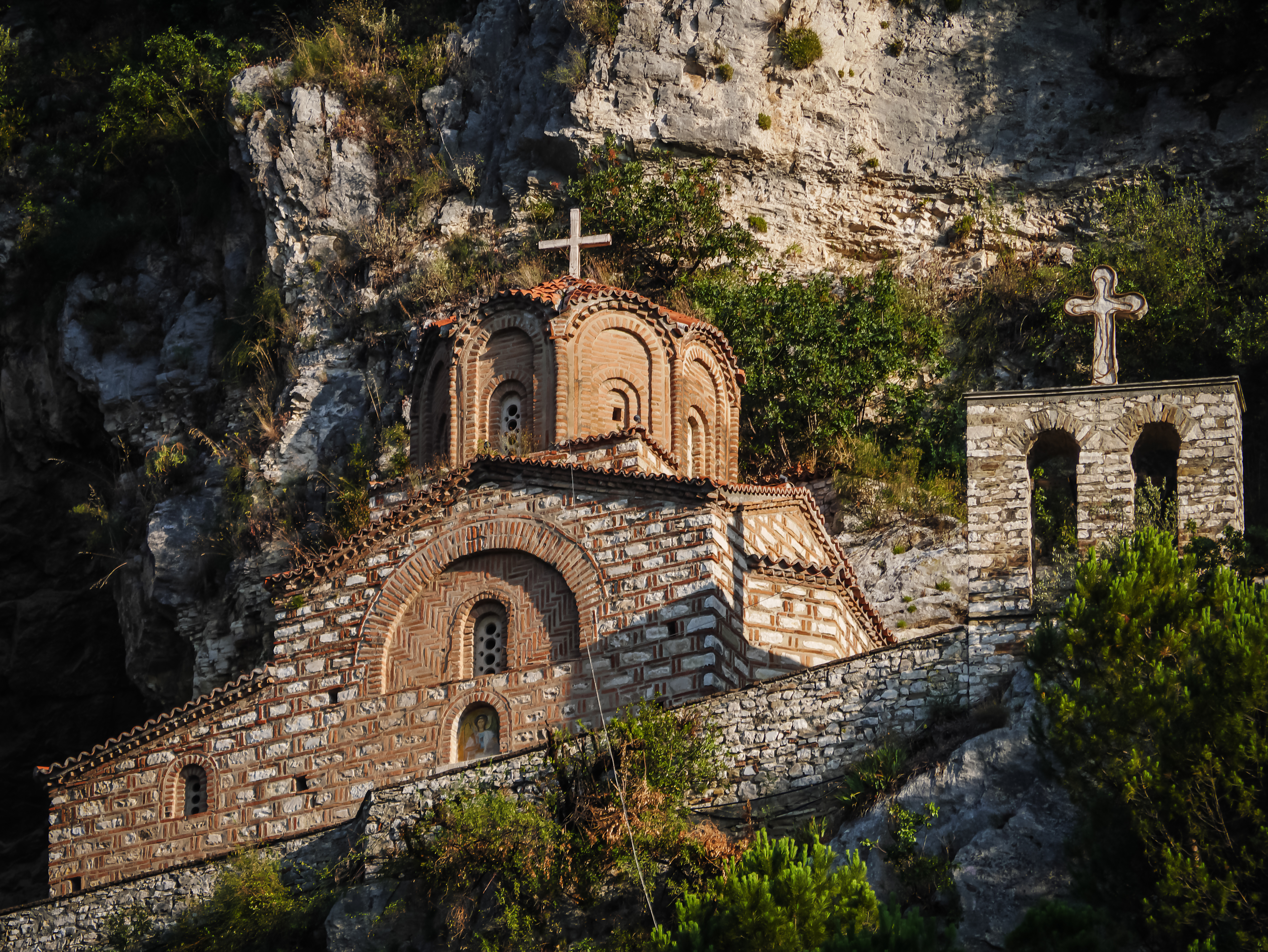
- Berat Çorovodë Osum Tomorr St. Michael Church

- Flag Emblem

- Map of Albania with Berat County highlighted
- Coordinates: 41°44′N 19°59′E
- Country: Albania
- Seat: Berat
- Subdivisions: 5 municipalities: Berat; Dimal; Kuçovë; Poliçan; Skrapar

Government
  - Council chairman: Donald Molishti (PS)

Area
  - Total: 1,798 km^{2} (694 sq mi)
  - Rank: 9th

Population (2023)
  - Total: 140,956
  - Rank: 8th
  - Density: 78.40/km^{2} (203.0/sq mi)
- Time zone: UTC+1 (CET)
  - Summer (DST): UTC+2 (CEST)
- HDI (2023): 0.819 very high · 8th of 12
- NUTS Code: AL031
- Website: www.qarkuberat.gov.al

Berat County (Albanian pronunciation: [beɽat]; Albanian: Qarku Berat), officially the County of Berat (Albanian: Qarku i Beratit), is a county in the Southern Region of the Republic of Albania. It is the ninth largest by area and the ninth most populous of the twelve counties, with around 140,956 people within an area of 1,798 km^{2} (694 sq mi). The county borders the counties of Elbasan to the north, Korçë to the east, Gjirokastër to the south and Fier to the west. It is divided into five municipalities, Berat, Dimal, Kuçovë, Poliçan and Skrapar, with all of whom incorporate twenty-five administrative units.

== History ==
Archaeologists have found artifacts including silver women's earrings and bronze belt-buckles in Bronze Age tumuli in Pëllumbas, one of the villages of Berat. These items are similar to other artifacts found in northern Albania (Kukës and Mat), Kosovo (Gjilan) and northwestern Greece (Pogoni).

Antipatrea (Ancient Greek: Ἀντιπάτρεια) was an ancient Greek polis in Illyria, now Berat. It was founded by Cassander as Antipatreia, who named it after his father Antipater at 314 BC. An ancient Greek fortress and settlement are still visible today. Dassaretae tribe existed in the area, as early as the 6th century BC. It was captured by the Romans in the 2nd century BC. Livy (31.27.2) describes Antipatrea as a strongly fortified city in a narrow pass that the Romans sacked and burned. The city was composed of two fortifications on both banks of the Osum River.

Historical manuscripts such as the 6th century Codex Purpureus Beratinus, discovered in 1868, and the Codex Aureus, a 9th-century Greek language manuscript have revealed much about the history of the region and that Berat had a reputation for producing manuscripts; 76 of the 100 codes protected in the National Archives of Albania are from Berat, indicating its historical importance.

Following the fall of the Roman Empire, the town of Berat became part of the Byzantine Empire, when it was known as Pulcheriopolis. In the 600s and 700s, Slavs from the regions of Kastoria and Ohrid settled in southern Albania, in the area enclosed by the valleys of the Vjosa and the Shkumbin, including around Berat. The region became part of the First Bulgarian Empire in the 840s, during the reign of Khan Presian, and remained under Bulgarian rule until Bulgaria's conquest by the Byzantine Empire in 1018. During that time, Berat was restored and renamed Bělgrad (Бѣлградъ), i.e., 'White City', which is where its current name derives from. After the Sack of Constantinople in 1204, the region fell to Michael I Ducas, the ruler of the Despotate of Epirus, and then to the Second Bulgarian Empire under Ivan Asen II.

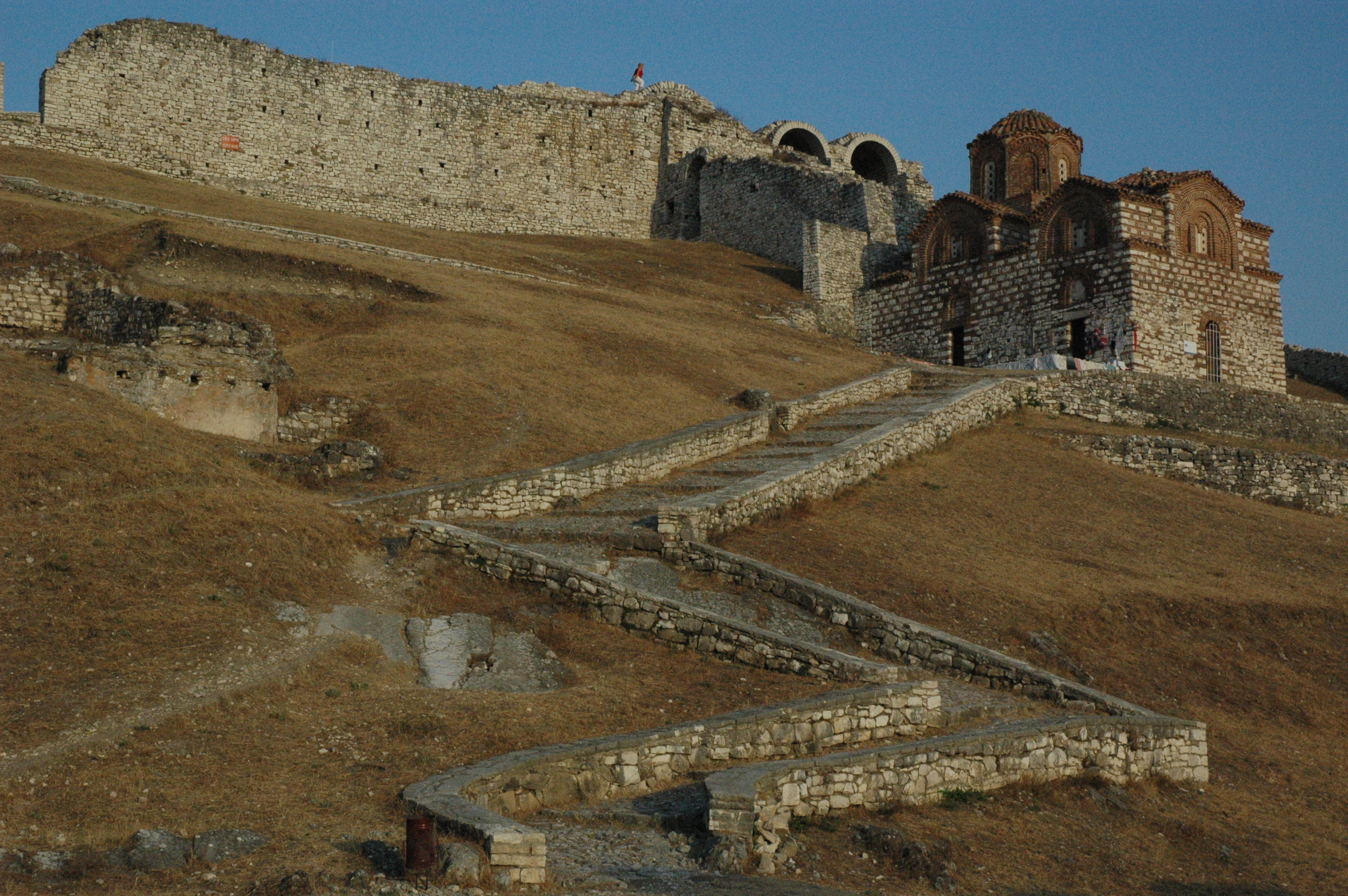
The entrance of the citadel of Berat, with the 13th-century Byzantine church of the Holy Trinity

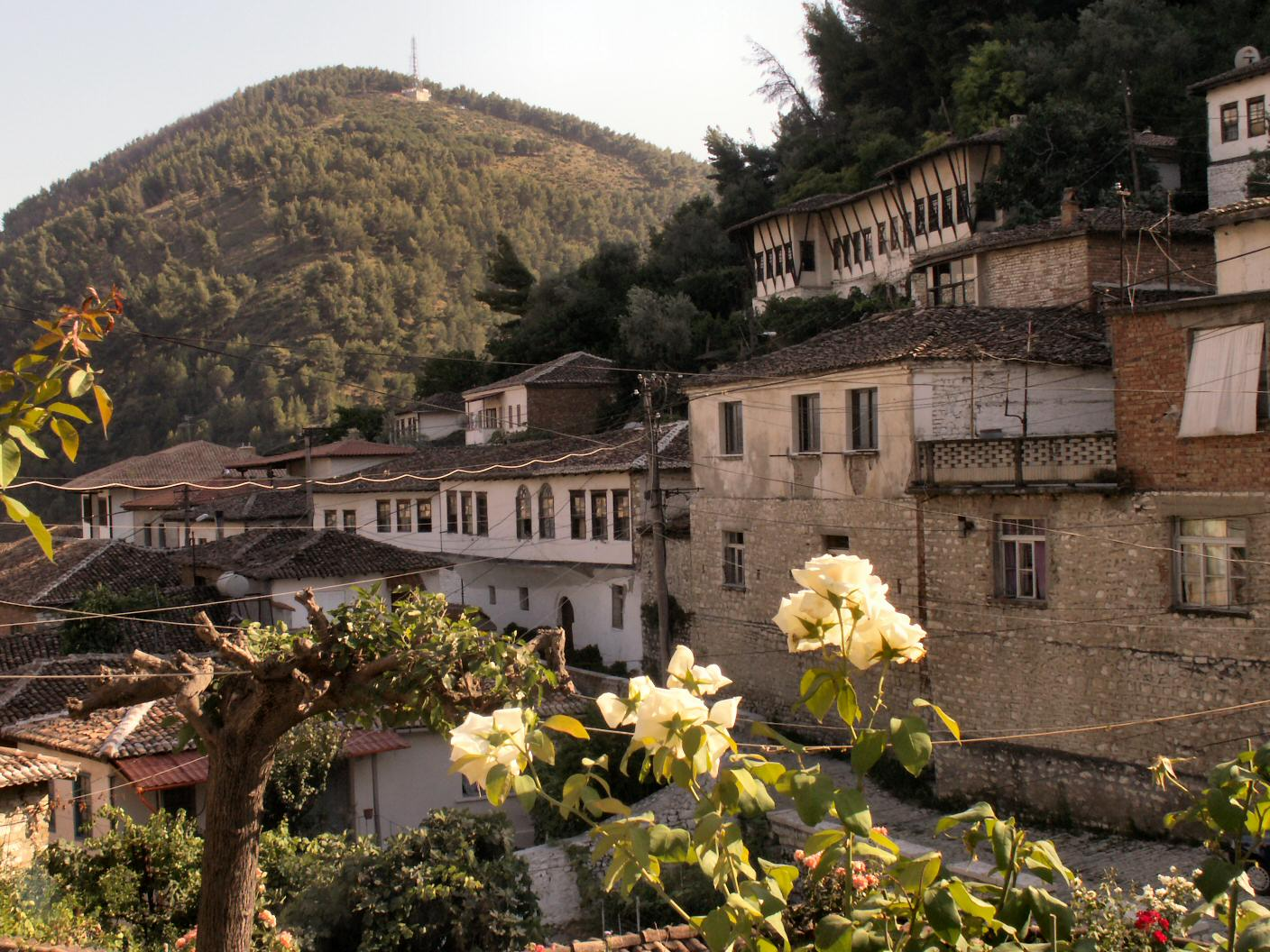
The old town of Berat

In the latter part of the 13th century, Berat again came under the control of the Byzantine Empire. In 1272 Berat was captured by the forces of the Kingdom of Albania, while Michael VIII Palaiologos sent letters to the Albanian leaders of Berat and Durrës asking them to abandon their alliance with Charles I of Naples; they sent the letters to Charles as a sign of their loyalty.

In 1274 Michael VIII recaptured Berat and after being joined by Albanians, who supported the Byzantine Empire marched unsuccessfully against the Angevin capital of Durrës.

In 1280–1281, the Sicilian forces under Hugh the Red of Sully laid siege to Berat. In March 1281, a relief force from Constantinople under the command of Michael Tarchaneiotes was able to drive off the besieging Sicilian army. In 1335–1337, Albanian tribes took control of the area between Berat and Vlorë for the first time, that time the Muzakaj formed the Lordship of Berat. Serbs took control of the area in 1345. Later, it passed back into the hands of Muzaka, restoring the Lordship, until 1450.

The Ottoman Empire conquered it in 1450 from the Muzaka family. Skanderbeg's Albanian forces unsuccessfully besieged the fort in 1455. It remained under Ottoman control until 1912, when it became part of Albania. Ali Pasha (born 1744-died 1822), an Ottoman Albanian ruler, took control of Berat between 1788 and 1822, as a semi-autonomous ruler. His domain was called the Pashalik of Yanina. He refortified the city in 1809. In 1867, Berat became a sanjak in the Janina (Yanya) vilayet. During Ottoman rule, it was known Arnavut Belgradı in Turkish (meaning "Albanian Belgrade") at first and then Berat.

During the early period of Ottoman rule, Berat fell into severe decline. By the end of the 16th century, it had only 710 houses. However, it began to recover by the 17th century and became a major craft centre in the Ottoman Balkans, specializing in wood carving. During the 19th century, Berat played an important part in the Albanian national revival. It became a major base of support for the League of Prizren, the late 19th century organisation which was pro-Albanian independence.

Between 1912 and 1914, it was under the control of the Albanian provisional government, and controlled by the Principality of Albania between 1914 and 1915. It was occupied by the Allies in 1915 during the First World War, despite Albania's neutrality, before falling to Austro-Hungarian forces in 1916. Austria-Hungary sustained the occupation until 1918, after which it was occupied by Italy. Italy had plans to create an autonomous province over Albania, including the area of Berat. However, following the defeat of Italy in the Vlora War, Albania retook control of Berat. Italy again occupied Berat in 1939 during the Italian invasion of Albania. Following Italy's capitulation, Germany occupied Albania between 1943 and 1944. In November 1944, the communist-controlled Anti-Fascist National Liberation Council of Albania declared in Berat that it was the provisional government of the country, signalling the beginning of the Enver Hoxha dictatorship. Communist Albania retained control over Albania for many decades, until finally falling in 1992. Berat has since then been part of the Republic of Albania.

== Geography ==
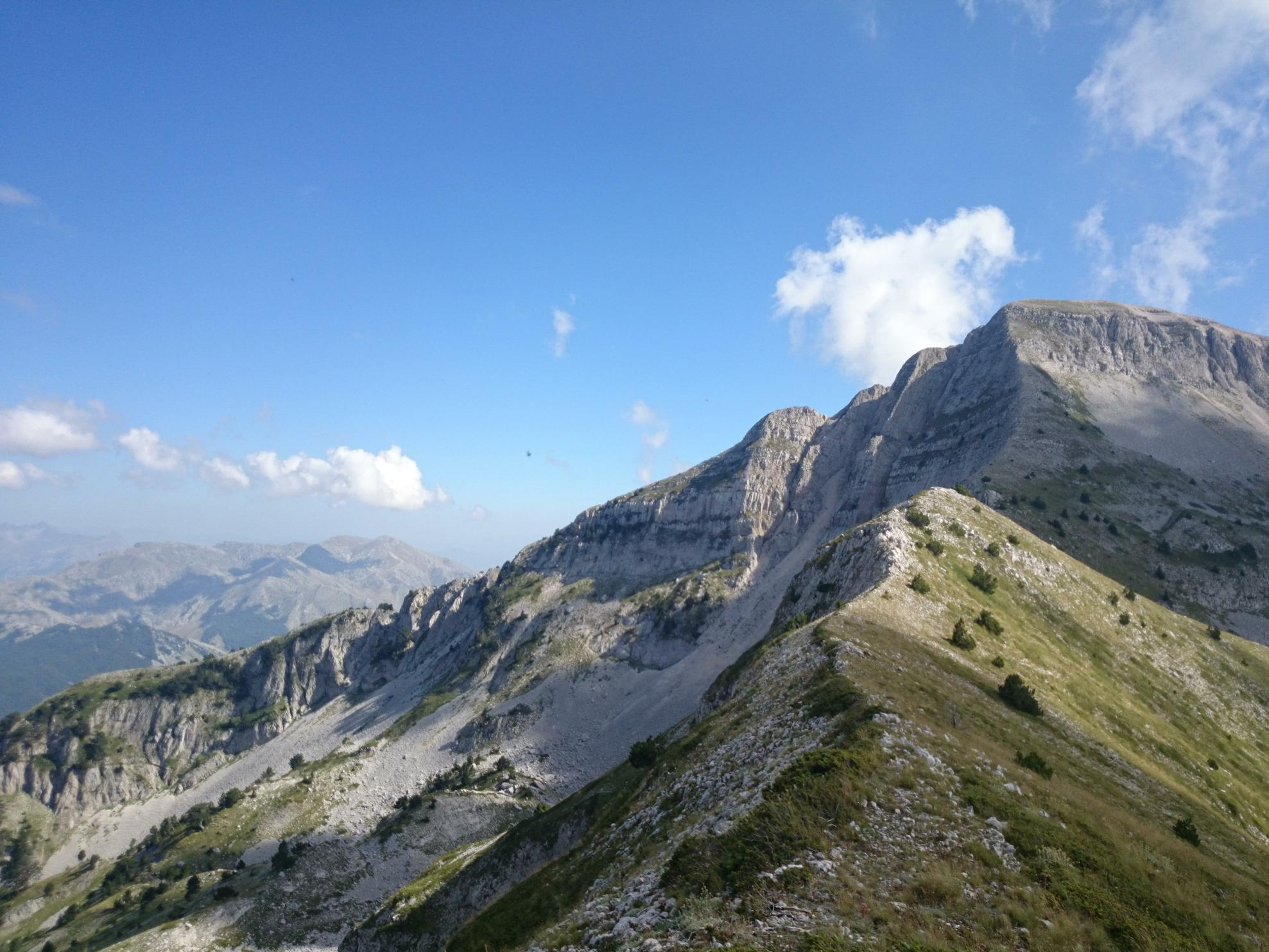
Tomorr is an anticlinal of limestone.

Berat is one of 12 counties of Albania, located in the north of the Southern Region. The county lies about 300 metres up to 2400 metres above sea level. It lies between latitudes 41° N, and longitudes 20° E. The county area is 1,798 km^{2} (694 sq mi) and the ninth unit of the Albanian county in area and the fifth in the Southern Region. Alone among the counties, Berat neither borders the sea nor another country. It is bordered by the counties of Elbasan to the north, Korçë to the east, Gjirokastër to the south, and Fier to the west.

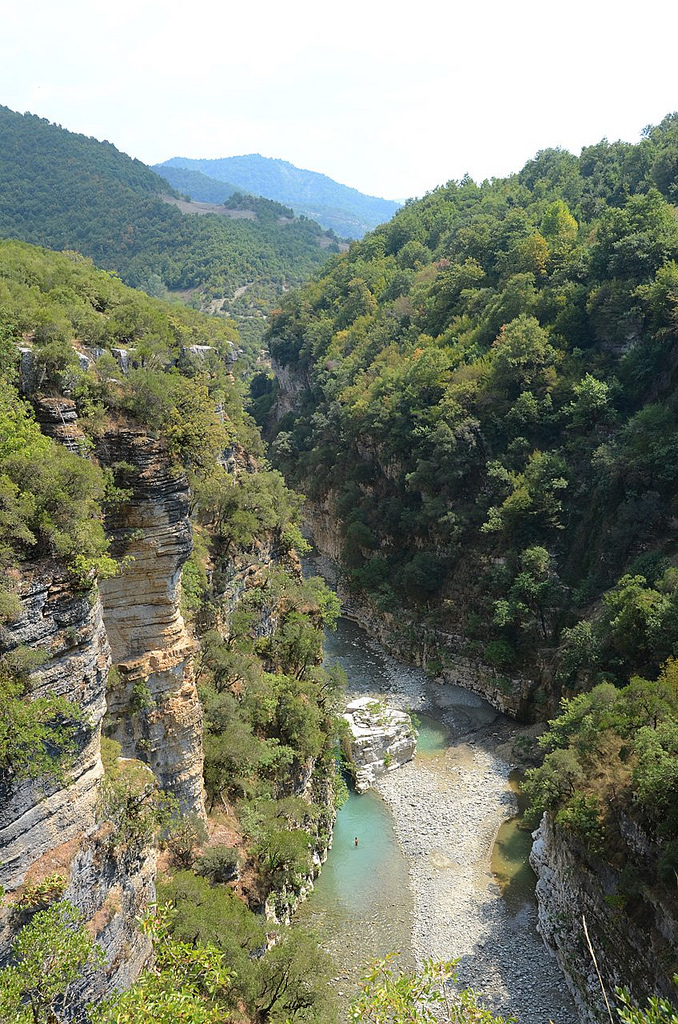
The Osum Canyon is thought to have been formed 3 million years ago by water erosion.

The physical relief of the south of the county is dominated by Tomorr massif (known as the Throne of Gods) and Mount Shpirag. Standing at 2,416 metres (7,927 ft) above sea level, the mountain is one of the highest points in Southern Albania. A deep ravine cut by the Osum river on Tomorrs west side, which is 915 metres (3,002 ft) deep in a limestone formation, is where Berat is situated on stepped terraces. The north is comprised mostly by lowlands and the Myzeqe plain. The valley of the Osum river flowing from southeast to the northwest becomes also wider.

The county is home to the source of the Seman river. The river originates close to Kuçovë at the confluence of the Osum and Devoll rivers. The Osum river flows through the Osum canyon and the city of Berat, where the river has formed the narrow Gorica gorge. The river banks tend to be densely forested. Other notable rivers include the Çorovoda river, passing through the town of Çorovodë.

The geographical formations of the region are frequently mentioned in local folklore. According to legend, Tomorr personified a giant who fought his brother Shpirag, personified by a nearby mountain, for the love of a young woman. The two brothers fought bitterly for her affections and ended up killing each other. Deep in sorrow, the legend states, the grieving woman for whom they had contested wept over their deaths; her tears created the Osum river. She was then said to have turned to stone, becoming the foundation on which Berat Castle is now built. Both Tomorr and Shpirag are visible from the city of Berat.

The county experiences a Mediterranean climate. This means that the winters are mild and wet and the summers are hot and dry but it vary by local topography. There are diverse microclimates in the county such as alpine climate. Summers are generally dry while heavy rains are experienced during the winter. Climate conditions near Berat are conducive to farming and related agricultural industries. Mean monthly temperature ranges between 6.5 °C (43.7 °F) (in January) and 24 °C (75 °F) (in July).

Phytogeographically, the county falls within the Illyrian deciduous forests and Pindus Mountains mixed forests terrestrial ecoregions of the Palearctic Mediterranean forests, woodlands, and scrub. Inside the county, there is a national park namely, the Tomorr National Park.

== Demographics ==
Historical population
Year	Pop.	±%
1950	78,593	—
1960	105,050	+33.7%
1969	140,030	+33.3%
1979	180,744	+29.1%
1989	222,901	+23.3%
2001	193,020	−13.4%
2011	141,944	−26.5%
2023	140,956	−0.7%

According to the latest national census in 2023 this county has 140,956 inhabitants. Ethnic groups in the county as of the 2011 census include:

- Albanians = 119,159 (83.95%)
- Greeks = 180 (0.13%)
- Macedonians = 13 (0.01%)
- Montenegrins = 1 (0.00%)
- Aromanians = 670 (0.47%)
- Romani = 202 (0.14%)
- Egyptians = 108 (0.08%)
- Others = 36 (0.03%)
- No answer = 20,427 (14.39%)

=== Religion ===
Between the 2011 and 2023 censuses in Berat, there were notable shifts in religious affiliation. The Sunni Muslim population saw a very large decrease from 50.2% to 29.4%, while Bektashi Muslims remained relatively stable, slightly decreasing from 8.2% to 8.1%. The Catholic Christian population declined from 1.1% to 0.6%, and Orthodox Christians decreased from 7.5% to 5.8%. Evangelical Christians saw a small rise from 0.1% to 0.2%.

There was a significant increase in the irreligious population: atheists rose from 3.4% to 5.1%, and those identifying as believers without denomination grew substantially from 8.4% to 15.2%. Meanwhile, the "Not stated/other" category saw a very large increase, rising dramatically from 20.8% to 35.4%.

Population of Berat according to religious group (2011–2023)
Religion group	Census 2011		Census 2023 (Revised Source)		Difference (2023−2011)	
Religion group	Number	Percentage	Number	Percentage	Number	Percentage
Sunni Muslim	71,226	50.2%	41,430	29.4%	-29,796	-20.8%
Bektashi Muslim	11,681	8.2%	11,422	8.1%	-259	-0.1%
Total Muslim	82,907	58.4%	52,852	37.5%	-30,055	-20.9%
Catholic Christian	1,631	1.1%	863	0.6%	-768	-0.5%
Orthodox Christian	10,624	7.5%	8,201	5.8%	-2,423	-1.7%
Evangelical	71	0.1%	293	0.2%	+222	+0.1%
Total Christian*	12,616	8.9%	9,693	6.9%	-2,923	-2.0%
Atheists	4,855	3.4%	7,155	5.1%	+2,300	+1.7%
Believers without denomination	11,981	8.4%	21,412	15.2%	+9,431	+6.8%
Total Non-religious	16,836	11.9%	28,567	20.3%	+11,731	+8.4%
Not stated / other**	29,585	20.8%	49,844	35.4%	+20,259	+14.6%
TOTAL	141,944	100%	140,956	100%	-988	–

== Culture ==
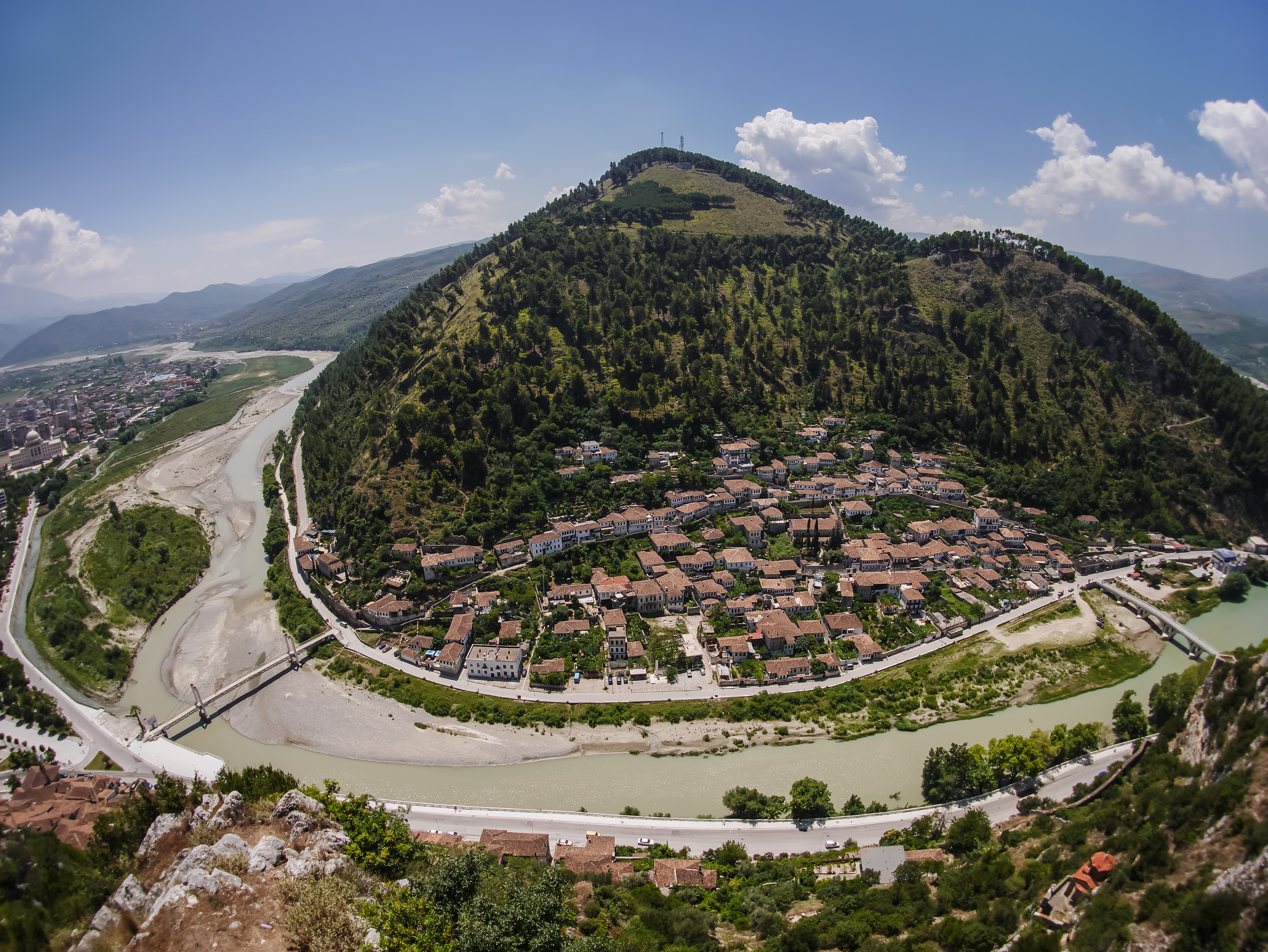
Berat has been included in the UNESCO list of World Heritage Sites since 2008.

The traditional religions in Berat are Islam and Christianity. The landscape of a mixture of minarets of mosques and grand orthodox churches and chapels are a testament to the religious coexistence of Berat inhabitants. In the Middle Ages, Berat was the seat of a Greek Orthodox Bishpric, and today Aromanian and even Greek speakers can be found in the city and some surrounding villages. In 2008, Berat was added to UNESCO's World Heritage list as an example of the coexistence of religions and cultures.

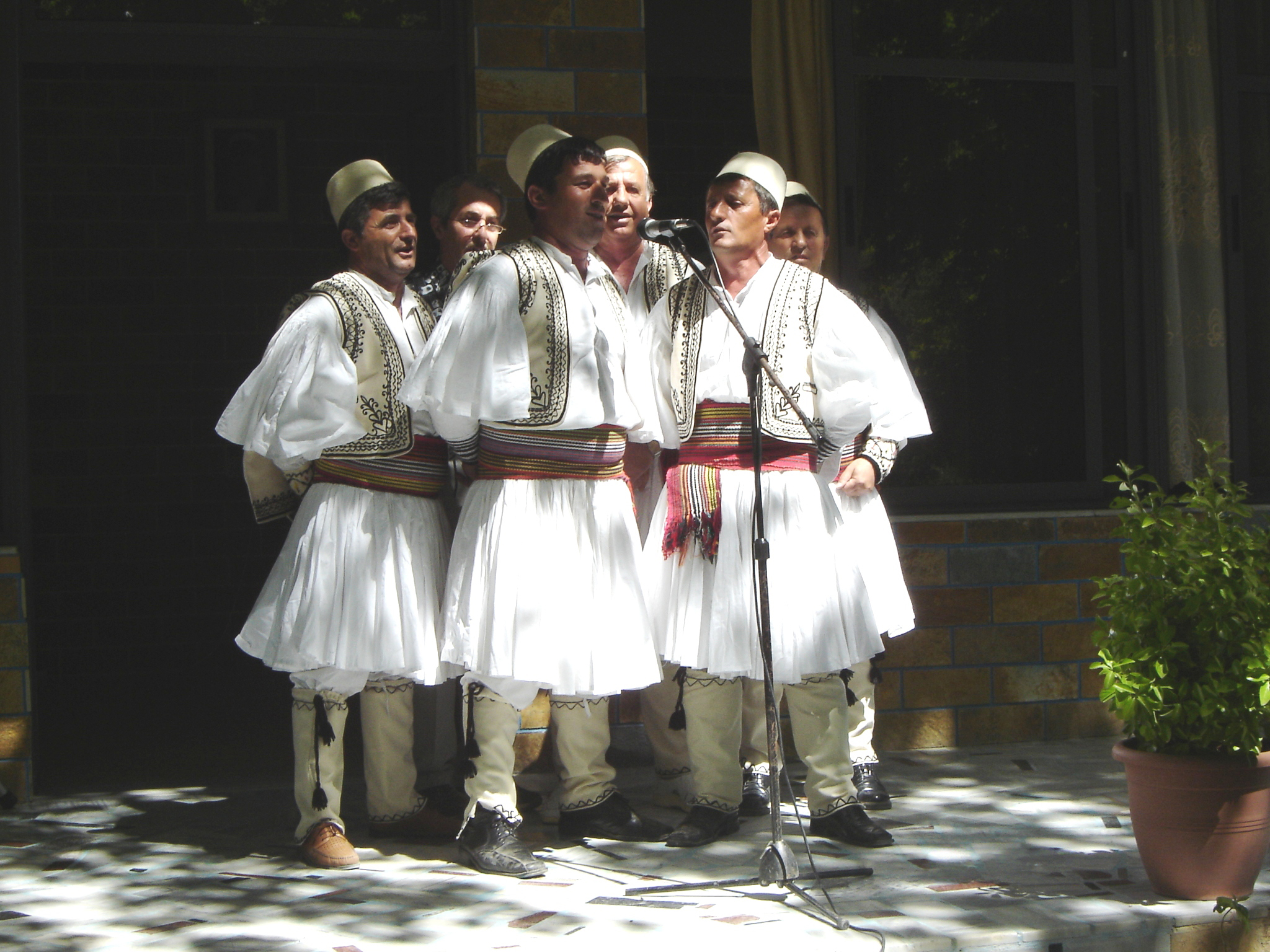
The Albanian iso-polyphony was recognised by UNESCO as an Intangible Cultural Heritage of Humanity.

The Saint Mary of Blachernae Church dates back to the 13th century and contains 16th century mural paintings by Nikola, son of the Albania's most famous medieval painter Onufri. The first inscription recording Onufri's name was found in 1951 in the Shelqan church. The Kastoria church dates to 23 July 1547 and has a reference to Onufri's origin: "I am Onufri, and come from the town of Berat." Onufri's style in painting was inherited by his son, Nikola (Nicholas), though not so successful as his father. Onufri's museum contains works of Onufri, Nikola and other painters. There is also a number of icons and some fine examples of religious silversmith's work (sacred vessels, icon casings, covers of Gospel books, etc.). Berat Gospels, which date from the 4th century, are copies (the originals are preserved in the National Archives in Tirana). The church itself has a magnificent iconostasis of carved wood, with two very fine icons of Christ and the Virgin Mary. The bishop's throne and pulpit are also of considerable quality.

Near the street which descends from the fortress is the Bachelors' Mosque (Albanian: Xhami e Beqareve), built in 1827. It has an attractive portico and an interesting external decoration of flowers, plants, and houses. The King Mosque (Albanian: Xhamia e Mbretit), the oldest in the town built in the reign of Bayazid II (1481–1512), is notable for its fine ceiling. The Lead Mosque (Albanian: Xhamia e Plumbit), built in 1555 and so called from the covering of its cupola. This mosque is the centre of the town. The Halveti Teqe (Albanian: Teqeja e Helvetive) of 1790 is a khanqah (or zawiya) of the Khalwati Sufi order. It has a porch and a carved and gilded ceiling. Near of tekke is purported to be the grave of Shabbatai Zevi, a Turkish Jew who had been banished to Dulcigno (present day Ulcinj) who created controversy among his followers upon his conversion to Islam. Folk music culture exists in Berat County and the performers often wear traditional dress. Albanians in Berat speak the Tosk dialect of the Albanian language.

== See also ==
- Geography of Albania
- Politics of Albania
- Divisions of Albania
