= Tourism in Albania =

- Official logo used to promote tourism in Albania.
- Website: Official Page

Tourism in Albania has been a key element of the country's economic activity and is constantly developing. Albania is characterized by its rich archaeological and cultural heritage dating back to the classical period when Illyrians and Ancient Greeks inhabited the region. Over the course of history, the territory of Albania was occupied and populated by Romans, Byzantines, Venetians and Ottomans. Notably the country features unspoiled beaches, mountainous landscapes, traditional cuisine, archaeological artifacts, unique traditions, low prices and the wild atmosphere of the countryside.

The country lies in Southeastern Europe bordering Montenegro to the northwest, Kosovo to the northeast, North Macedonia to the east and Greece to the south. The Mediterranean Sea with the Adriatic and Ionian Sea make up the entire west border of the country. The country's coastline length is about 481 km (299 mi) composed of both sandy and rocky beaches, bays, caves, cliffs, capes and lagoons. Although the country features notable diversity with the landscape ranging from the snow-capped Albanian Alps, Sharr, Skanderbeg, Korab, Pindus and Ceraunian Mountains to the sunny Albanian Adriatic and Ionian Sea Coasts.

Yearly tourist arrivals in millions

The country has a distinctly Mediterranean climate. Across the country's territory there is a wide range of microclimates due to differing soil types and topography. The warmest areas of the country are found at the coasts where the climate is profoundly impacted by the sea, while the coldest parts at the northern and eastern hinterlands, where snowy forested climate is prevalent.

With a total of 3.8 million visitors, Albania is the 25th most visited country in Europe. Lonely Planet ranked Albania as the number 1 destination to be visited in 2011. The New York Times ranked the Albanian coast 4th among 52 destinations to be visited in 2014. Although still underdeveloped, Albania is set to prime its debut on the world scene as it celebrates a century of independence. A Huffington Post article outlined 10 reasons for visiting Albania in 2013. Recently, Albania has been given the official slogan "Go Your Own Way". Previously, it had the slogan "A New Mediterranean Love". According to the Albanian Institute of Statistics, around 4.73 million foreign citizens have visited Albania in 2016. Foreign tourism in the country has boomed since 2019.

A number of renowned international hotel chains are making their presence known in Albania, including Mariott, Hyatt, Maritim Plaza, Hilton Garden Inn, MK Hotels, and Best Western in Tirana, as well as Melia Hotels International in Durrës, while others are awaiting the green light to start operations mainly in Tirana, the Albanian Alps, and along the Albanian Riviera.

== Regions ==
=== Northern Albania ===
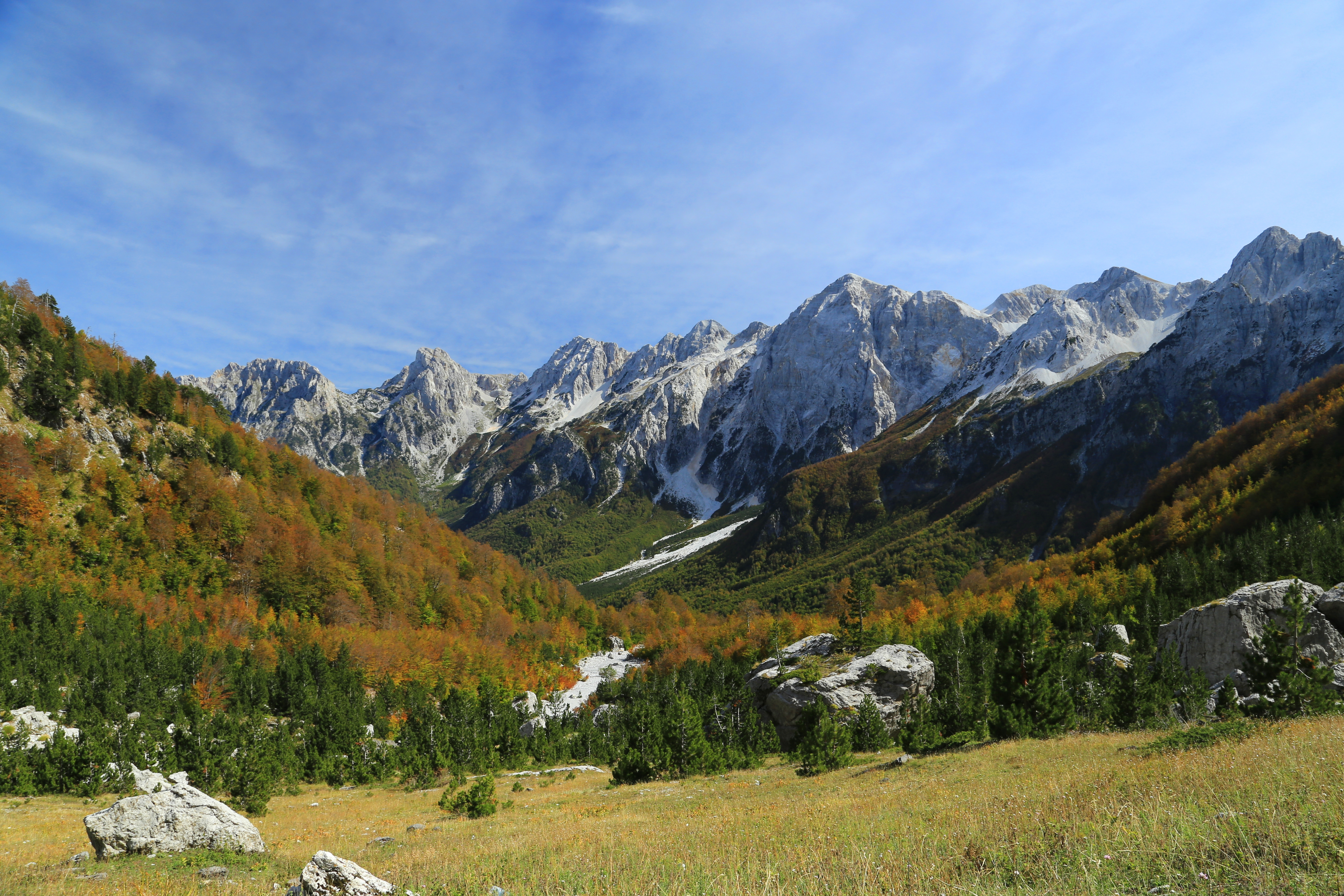
Scenic autumn view of Valbonë Valley National Park

The northern region of the country is particularly known for its natural and cultural heritage, picturesque alpine mountainous landscapes, scenic highlands, glacial lakes, rich flora and fauna, curative sandy beaches, and historic regions with ancient traditions and delicious cuisine. It is underlain by karstic rock, mainly dolomite and limestone with associated lakes and cave which has given rise to the most distinctive feature of its lakes and rivers.

The Albanian Alps are among the most valuable and unique features of the northern region of Albania. Its mountainous landscape with multiple contrasts, traversed by river valleys with crystal waters, gorges and mountain saddles with a rich biodiversity attracts both domestic and foreign tourists from all over the world. Alps of Albania National Park offers a variety of opportunities for tourism, fishing, mountaineering and trekking. The Valbona Pass, standing at 1,795 ha (17.95 km^{2}), separates scenic valleys. The Albanian traditions, hospitality, culture and culinary values of this region are strong elements that those parks offer for tourists. The villages of Theth are surrounded on four sides by numerous two-thousanders such as Radohima in the west, Arapi and Poplluka in the north and Jezerca in the east. It is well known for its unique Roman Catholic churches, folk traditions but also its natural heritage.

Gashi River and Rajcë are both a UNESCO World Heritage Site and Nature Reserve. They offers a fascinating and incredibly diverse picture of the original landscapes with less human impact. The river originates and flows through the Albanian Alps in the north until it reaches the Valbona River.

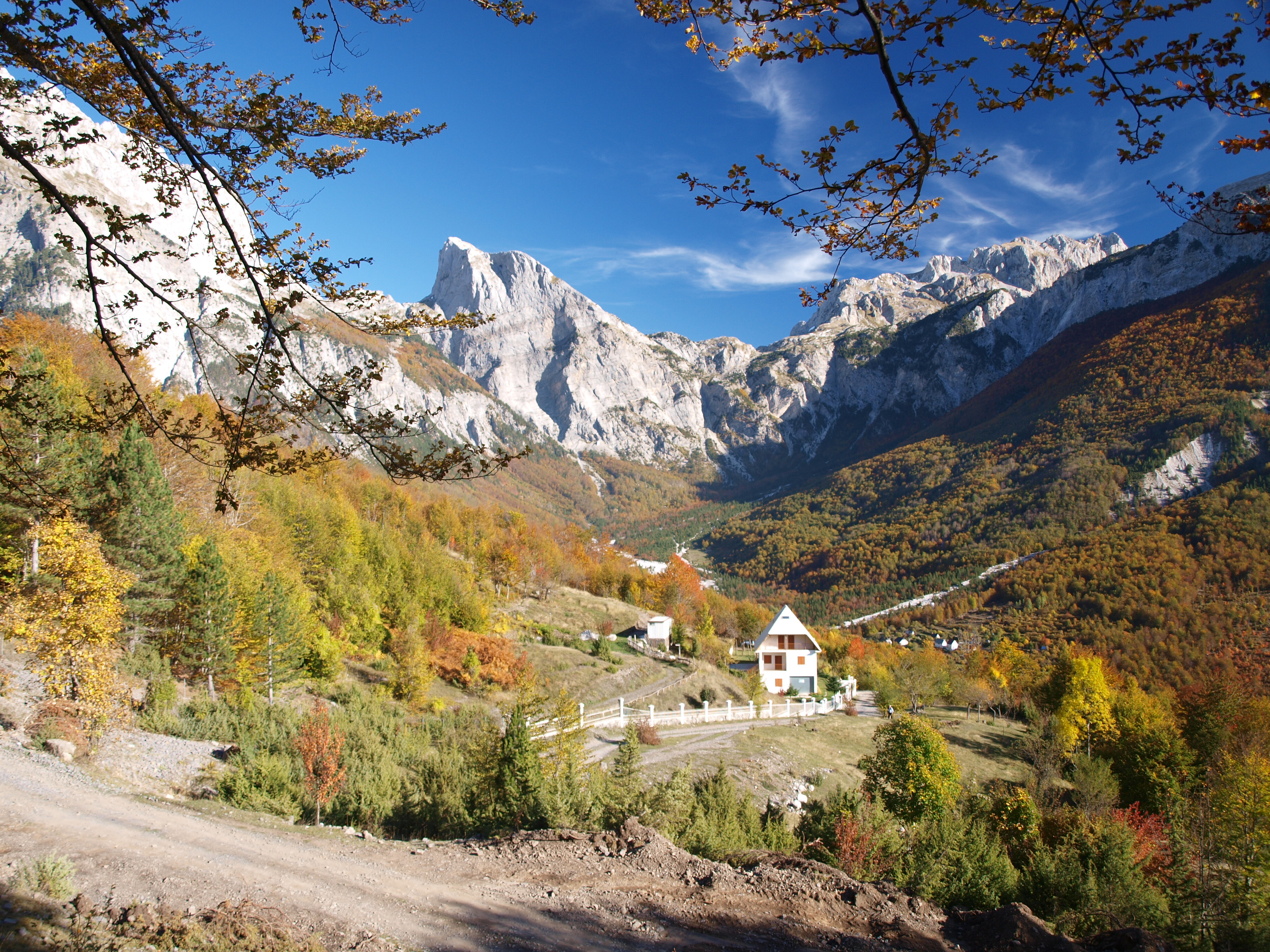
Landscape within the Theth National Park

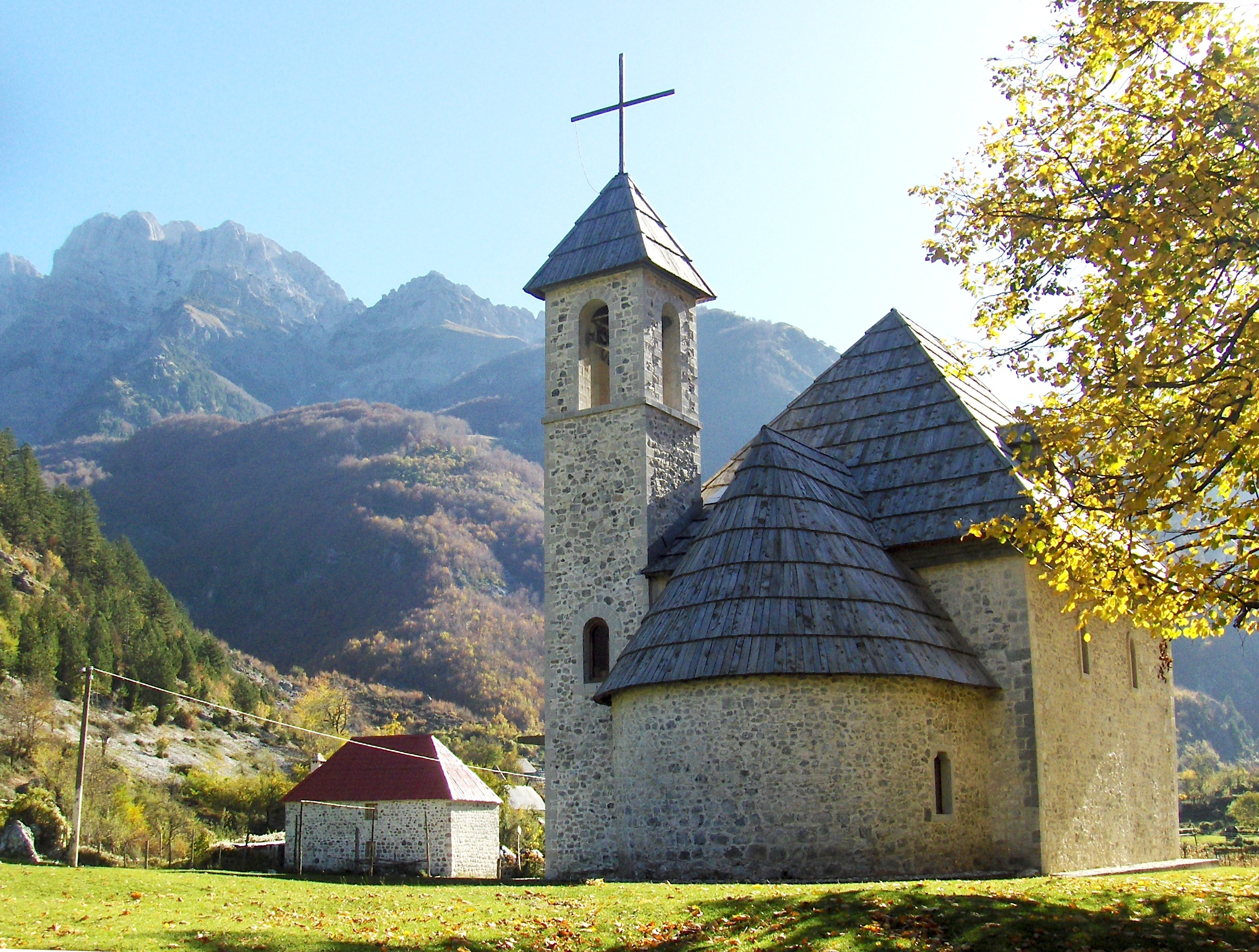
Typical architecture in Theth

Nikaj-Mërtur Regional Nature Park is an area of scenic alpine landscapes, deep river valleys, vertical cliffs, dense forests and small lakes. It lies within the Dukagjin highlands and borders Alps of Albania National Park.

The Lake Koman within the Albanian Alps, a unique journey amidst spectacular mountain views, is a popular ferry ride in Southern Europe.

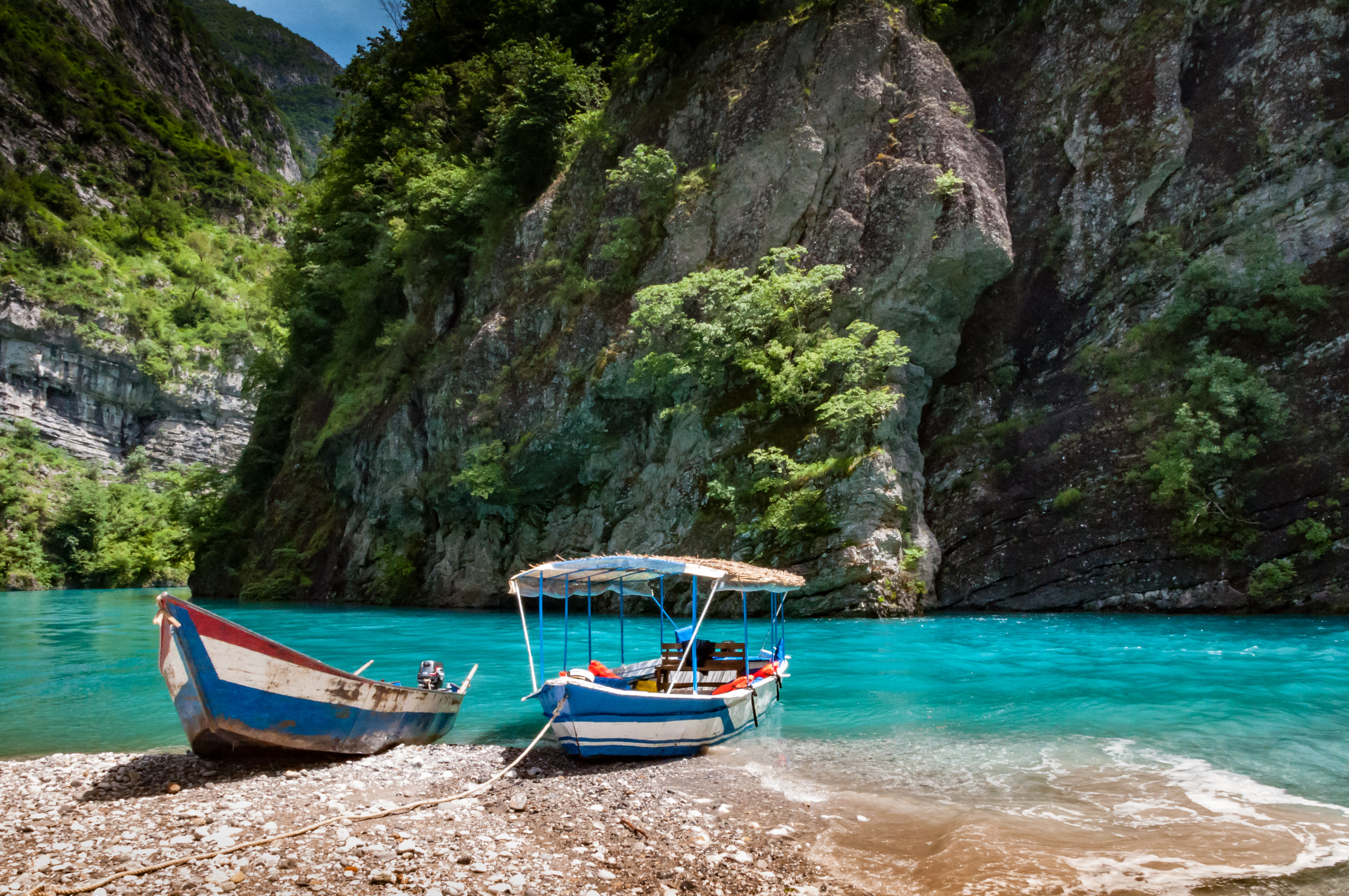
Lake Koman is often compared to the Scandinavian fjords.

Shkodër has been founded since the 4th century BC by the Illyrian tribes of the Ardiaei and Labeates. Nowadays, it exerts strong influences in culture, religion, arts and entertainment of northern Albania. The city is dotted with numerous different structures. It retains its characteristic appearance with narrow streets with tall stone walls on both sides and tall gates. The Rozafa Castle, east of the city, is one of the most prominent architectural features on the region.

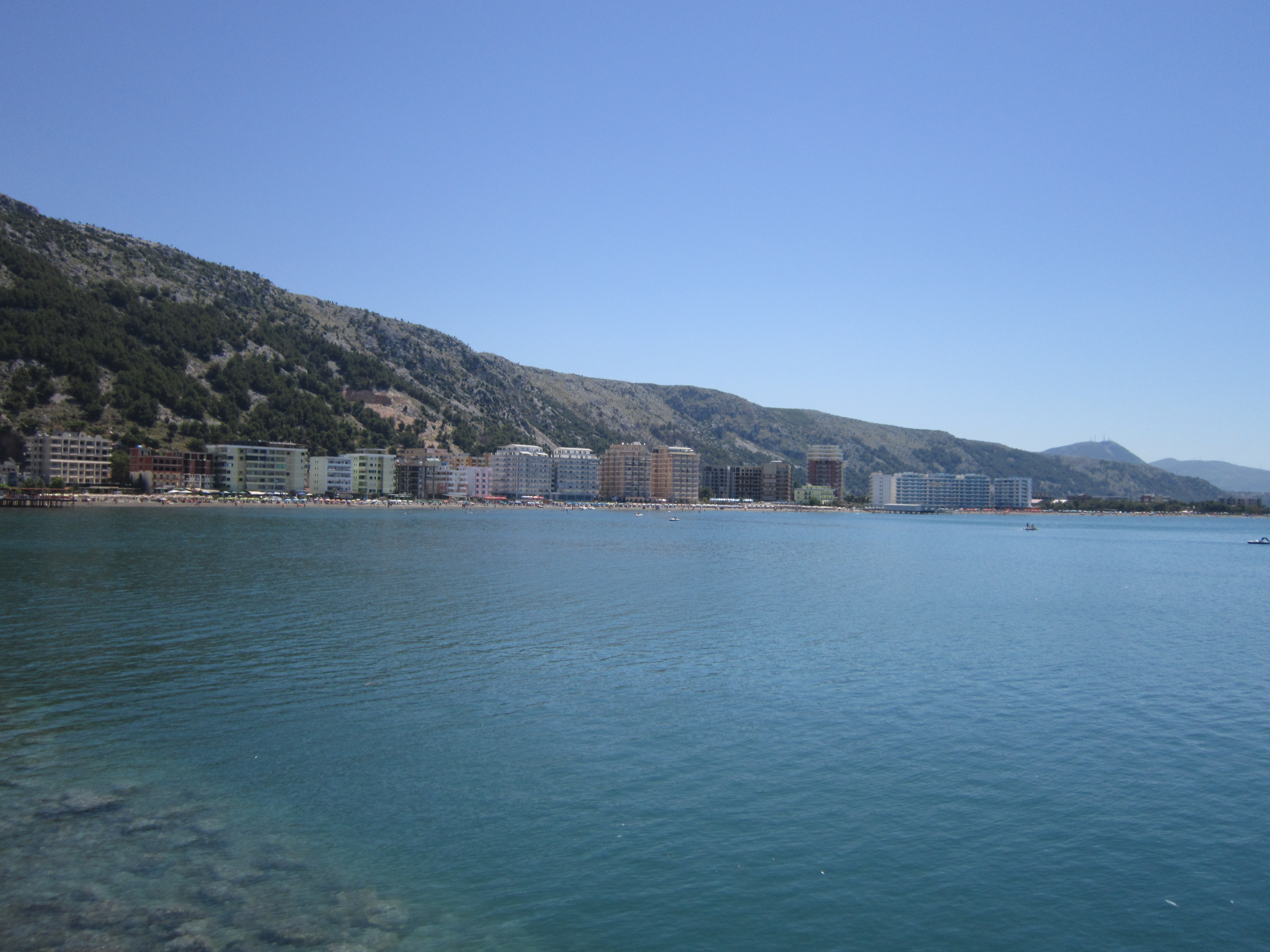
Shengjin Waterfront. UNUM International Electronic Music Festival is organized every summer at Rana e Hedhun coastal sand dune.

Lake Shkodër, the largest lake in Southern Europe, is a popular destination due to its natural richness and ease of access both from land and sea. The surrounding area around the lake is desirable for a vacation spent in peace and quiet. Other tourist attractions include sailing, fishing and other water sports.

Emerging agritourism areas includes Pukë, the panoramic Ulëz lake and the nearby Vau i Dejes, Barbullush and Fishte villages in Zadrima near the city of Lezhë, Katund i Vjeter in the Mirdita region near Rubik, but also Shishtavec near Kukës, and the alpine area of Nikaj-Mertur in Lekbibaj region near Bajram Curri. Other emerging areas include fishing villages of Shiroka, Zogaj, and Grile or Omaraj along the Lake Shkodër.

Northern Albania's main seaside towns include Shengjin and Velipoja, the former being a major port town and the latter known for its curative beach sand. Very popular during the summer months, Shengjin is becoming worldwide known for organizing electronic music UNUM Festival at Rana e Hedhun sand dune tourist attraction. Velipoja is known for its protected area of abundant pine trees and fauna species.

=== Central Albania ===
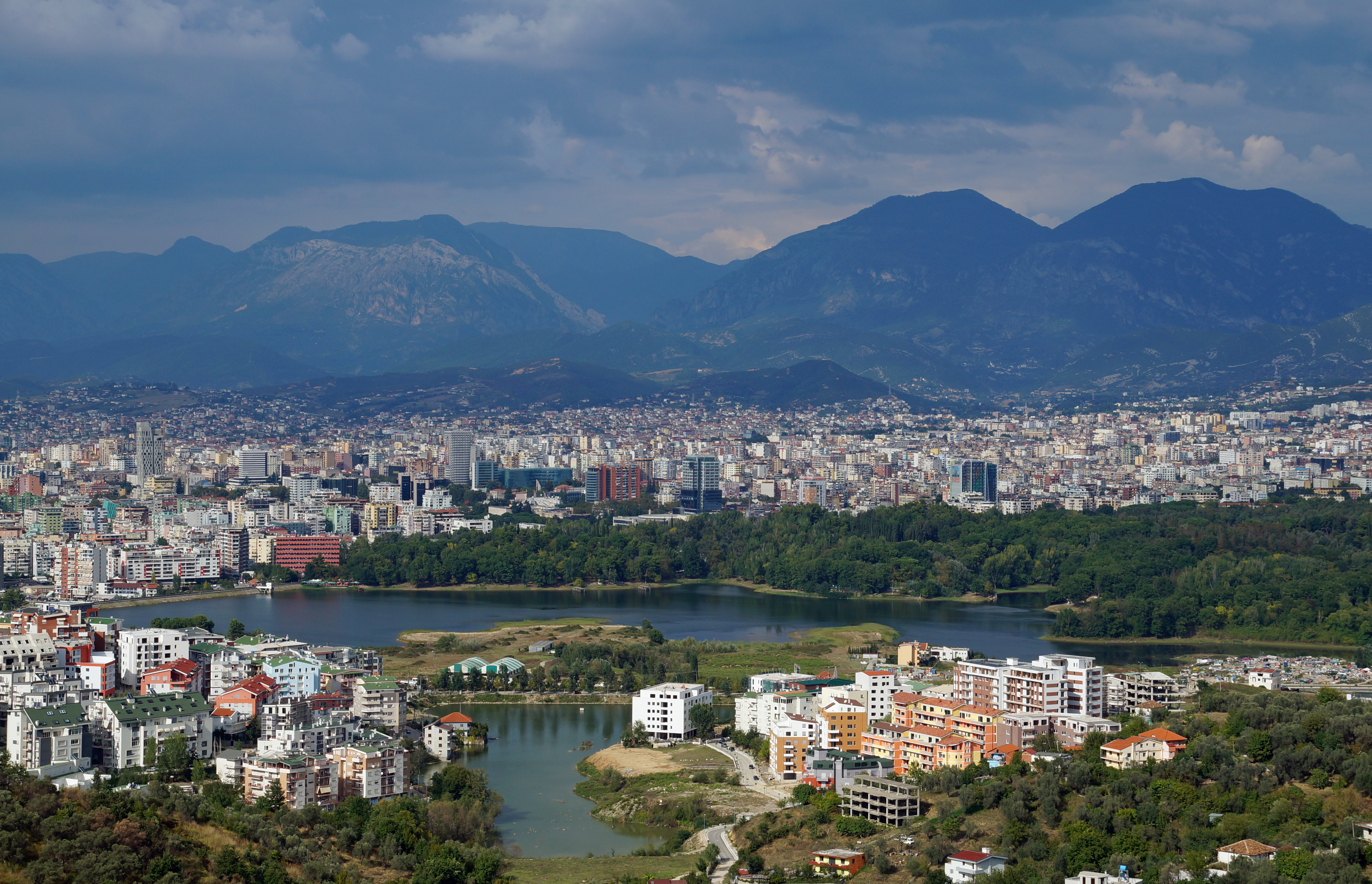
View over the city of Tirana with Mt Dajti in the distance

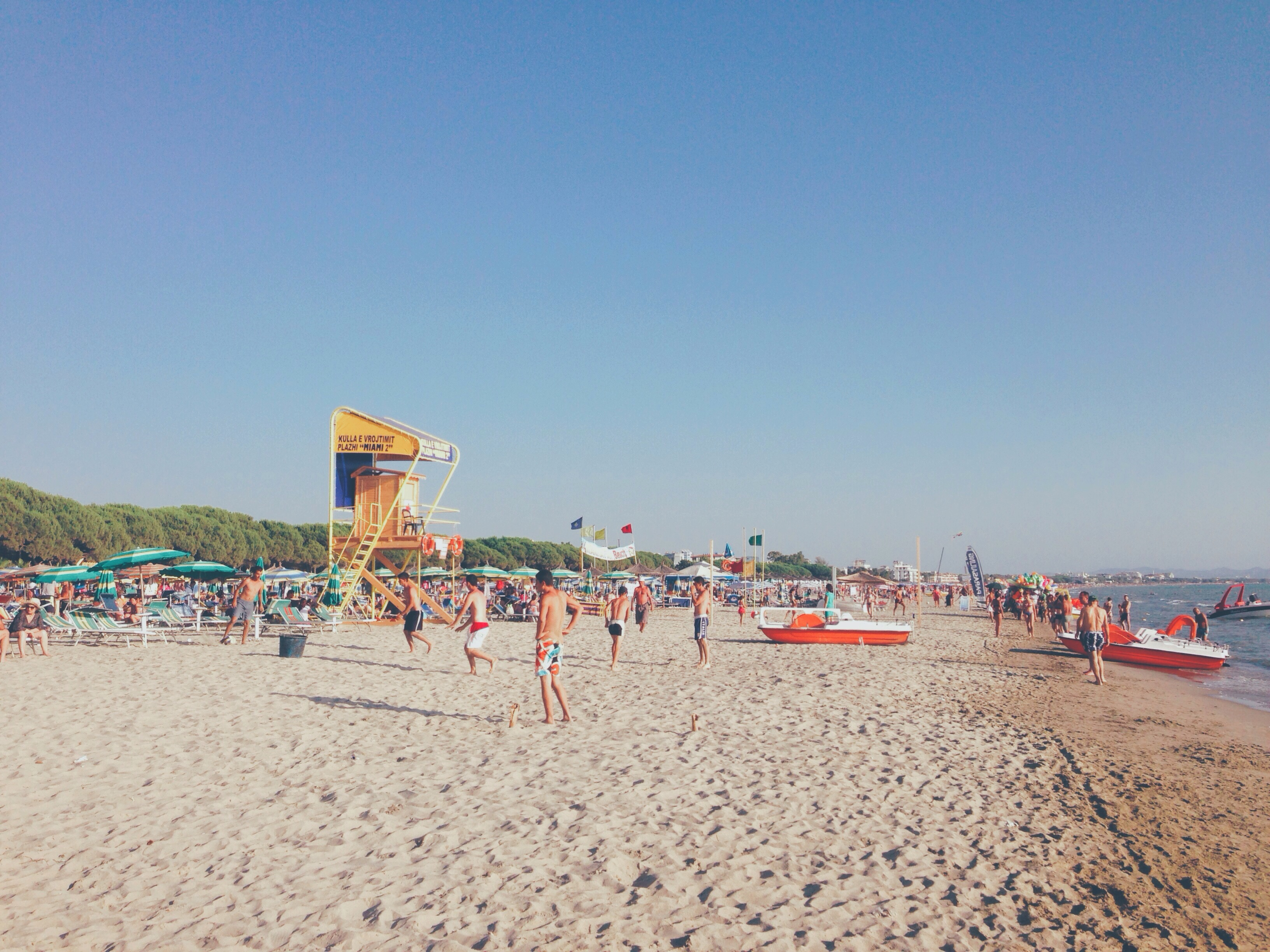
Golem beach, south of Durrës, is a popular summer retreat.

The central region of Albania alternates between archaeological sites, castles, caves, long stretches of curative sandy beaches and lagoons, perfect for bird-watching. It encompasses mostly the counties of Durrës, Tirana, Fier and Elbasan. In terms of geology, it is dominated by the Myzeqe Plain in the west Skanderbeg in the center and Korab Mountains in the east.

Tirana, the country's capital city, officially dubbed as 'The Place Beyond Belief' by local authorities is known for its cultural heritage, religious diversity, the colourful buildings, Italian and Socialist architecture, and natural attractions such as Dajti Mountain and parks around artificially created lakes. Tirana is also widely known for its stylish restaurant scene featuring particularly delicious food under the Slow Food lifestyle, and the traditional agritourism areas in the southern and eastern outskirts of the city towards Durrës, Elbasan, and Dajti respectively. The city organizes many festivals, sports competitions, live music performances, and is home to several regionally known shopping centers.

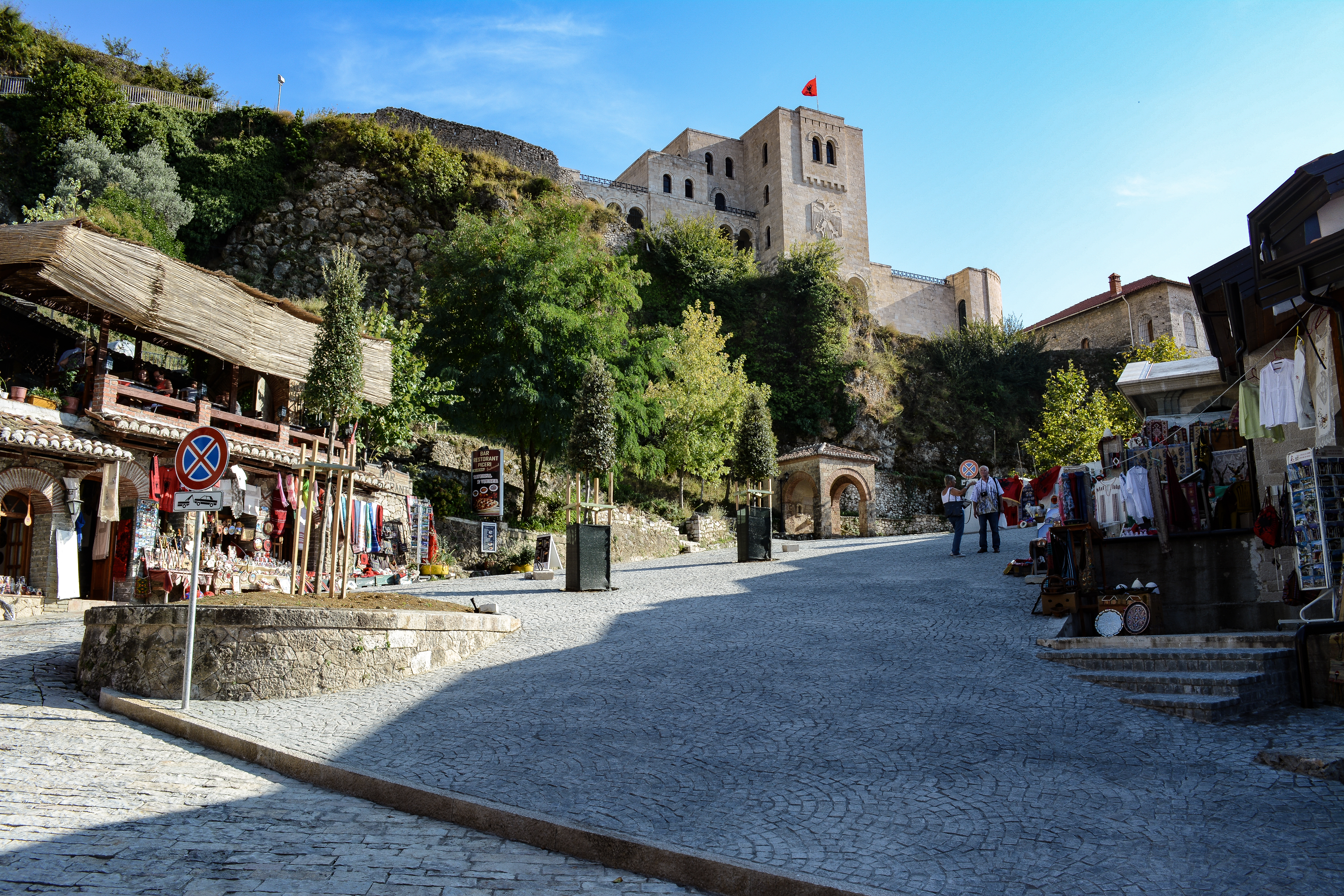
City center of medieval town of Krujë

Dajti National Park encompasses Dajti, the capital's hausberg in the east. It is accessible all year round and can be reached on foot or cable cars. Climbing the mountain offers visitors views down into Tirana and over the mountains behind it, part of the Mali me Gropa-Bizë-Martanesh Protected Landscape. Dajti has been referred to as the Balcony of Tirana because of its panoramic vista.

Krujë, the capital of the Principality of Arbër during the Middle Ages, is called by locals as the Adriatic Balcony from the view that offers day and night. Due to the long and continuous history of the city, it is home to several archaeological sites and structures that are still evident.

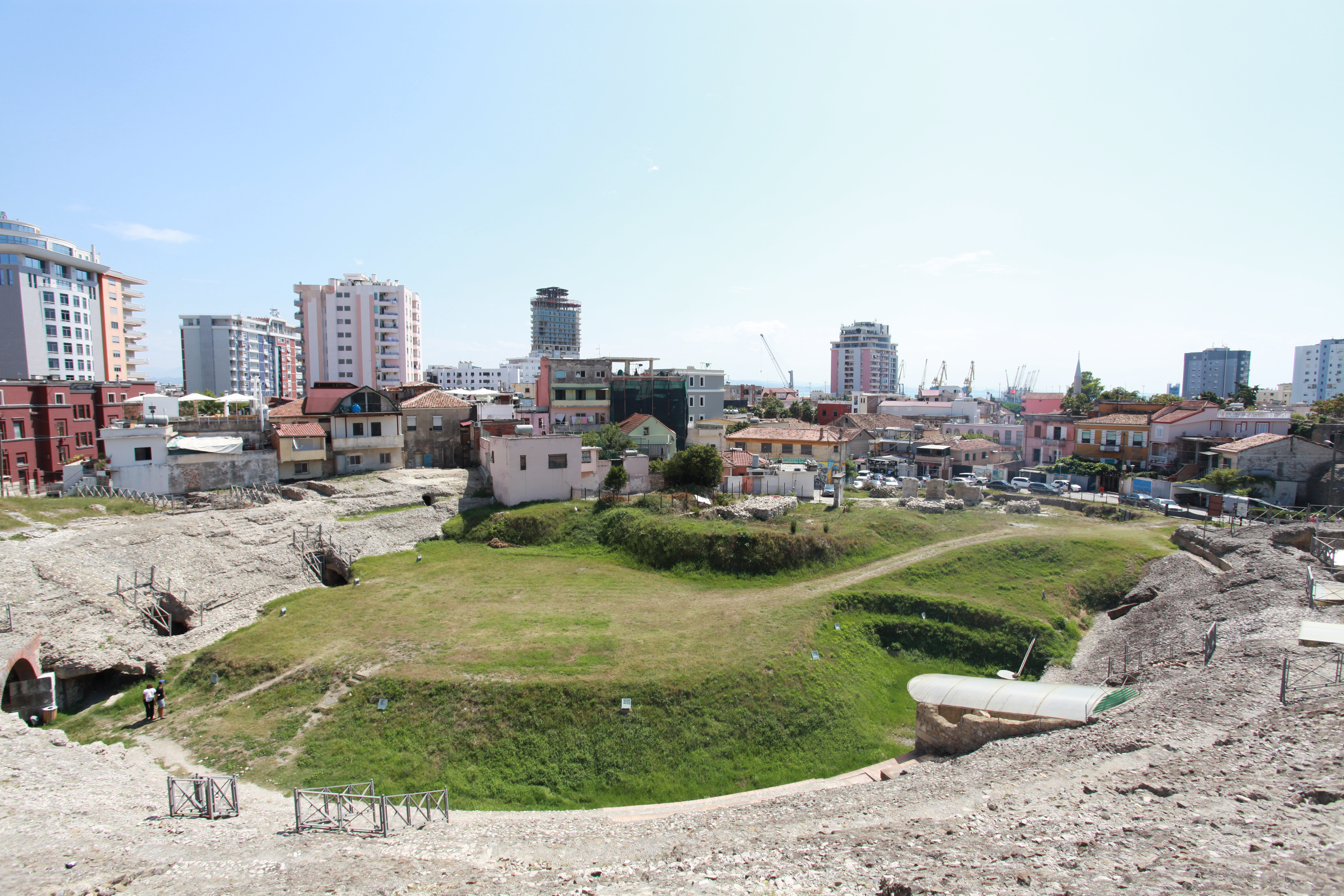
Panorama of Durrës and its amphitheatre

Durrës is one of the oldest cities in the world and home to the Durrës Amphitheatre, which is among the largest in the Balkan Peninsula. Numerous elements of different architectural styles from antiquity to present day are present throughout the city. The coastal waters offer beaches, bays, capes, fishing and sailing.

The Divjaka-Karavasta National Park includes the Karavasta Lagoon, the largest lagoon in the country and one of the largest in the Adriatic Sea. The lagoon is separated from the sea by a narrow strip of sand. Its mediterranean climate and geology enables the presence of a wide range of animals and plants, which are fast becoming rare in Southern Europe.

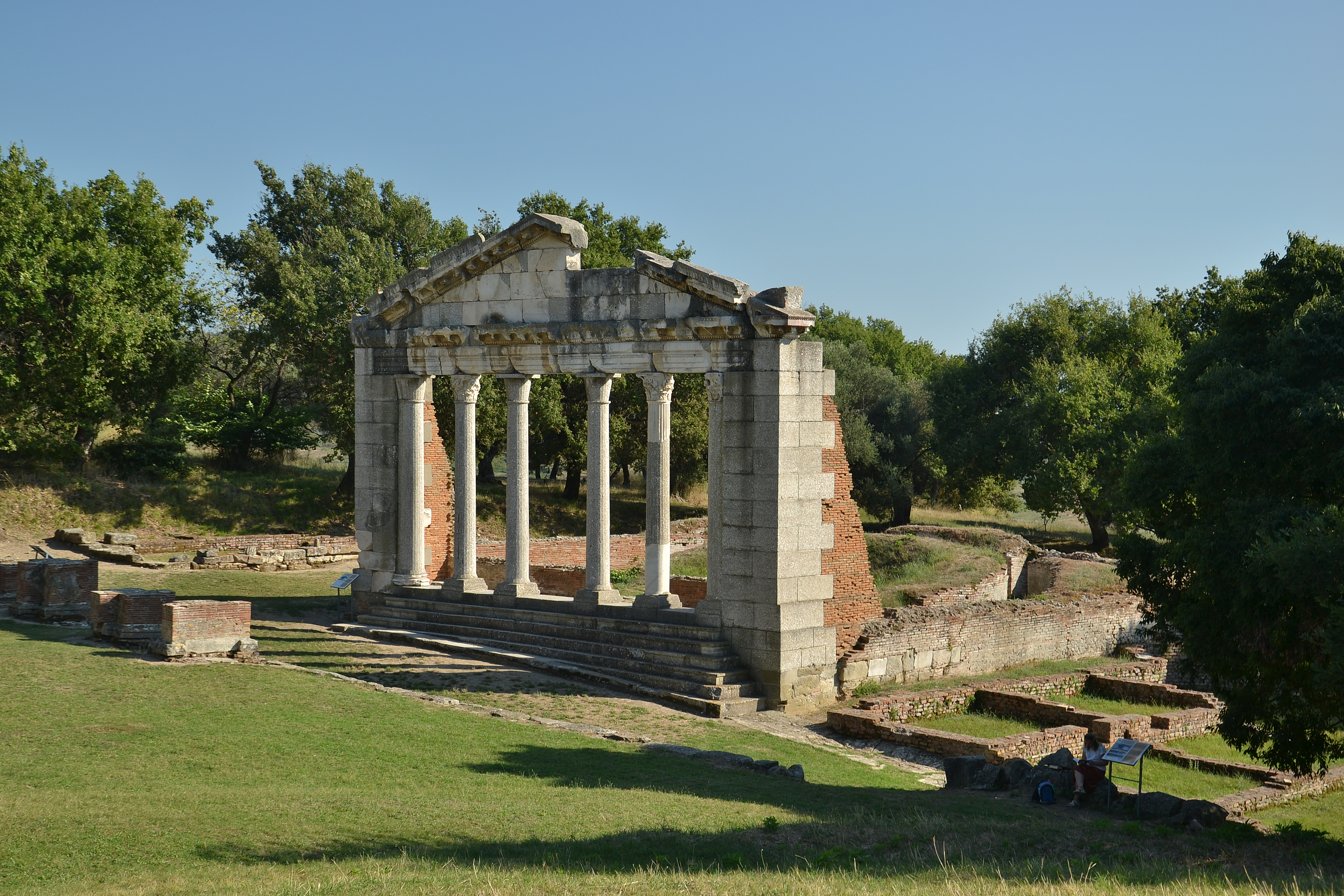
Monument of Agonothetes in Apollonia

Apollonia is one of the most popular archaeological sites in the country, which was inhabited by both Taulantiis and Corinthians in antiquity. It is one of the most complete architectural and cultural features on the Albanian Adriatic Sea Coast. The remains of the site have been investigated by archaeologists from 1916, still, much of the site remains unexcavated to this day.

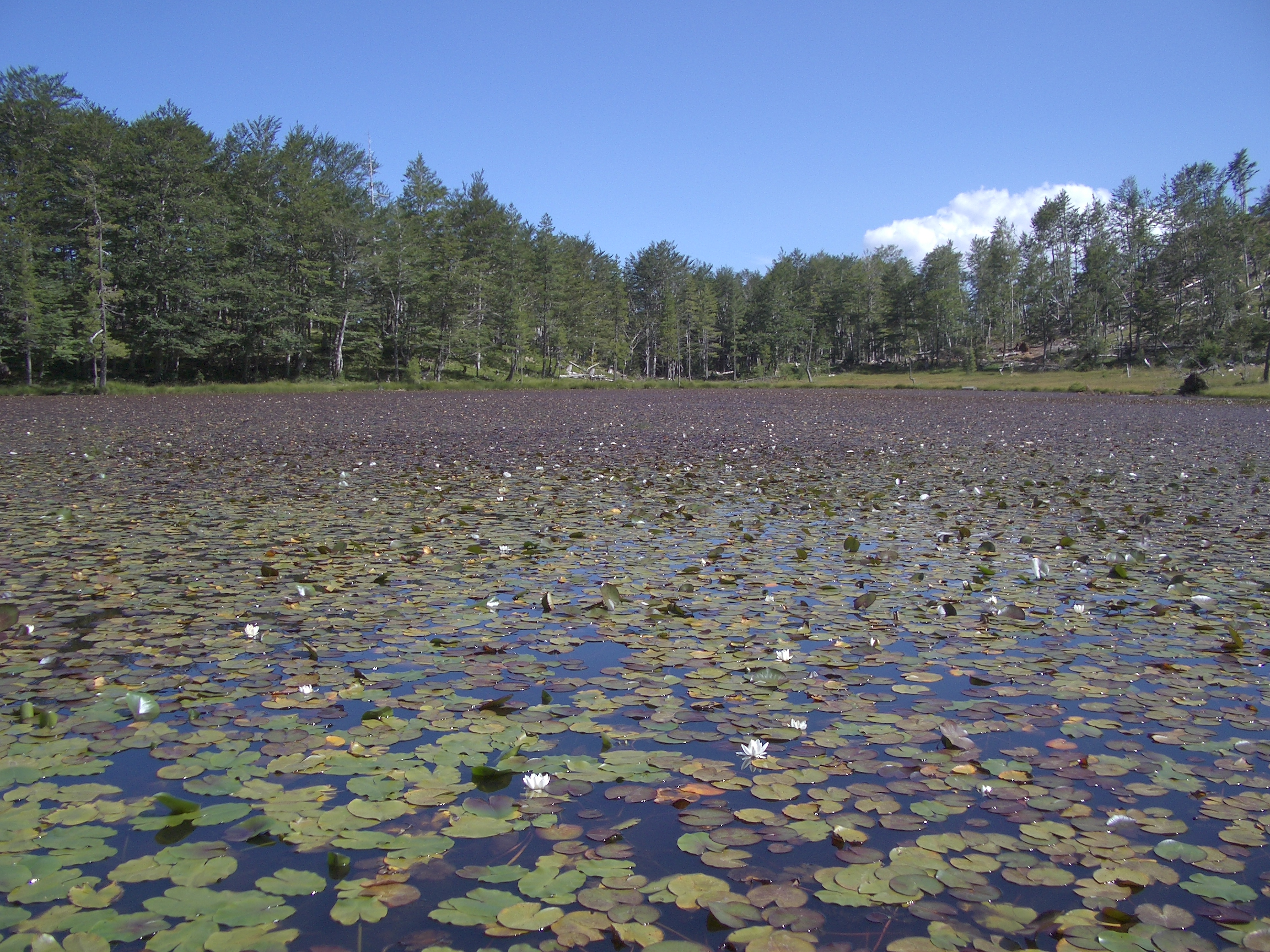
Liqeni i Luleve in Lura-Dejes Mt National Park

Lura-Dejes Mt National Park is known for its twelve glacial lakes, which were formed during the Würm glacial period. It provides striking scenery with intensive fissures and mountainous landscape without any human intervention, very rare in Southern Europe.

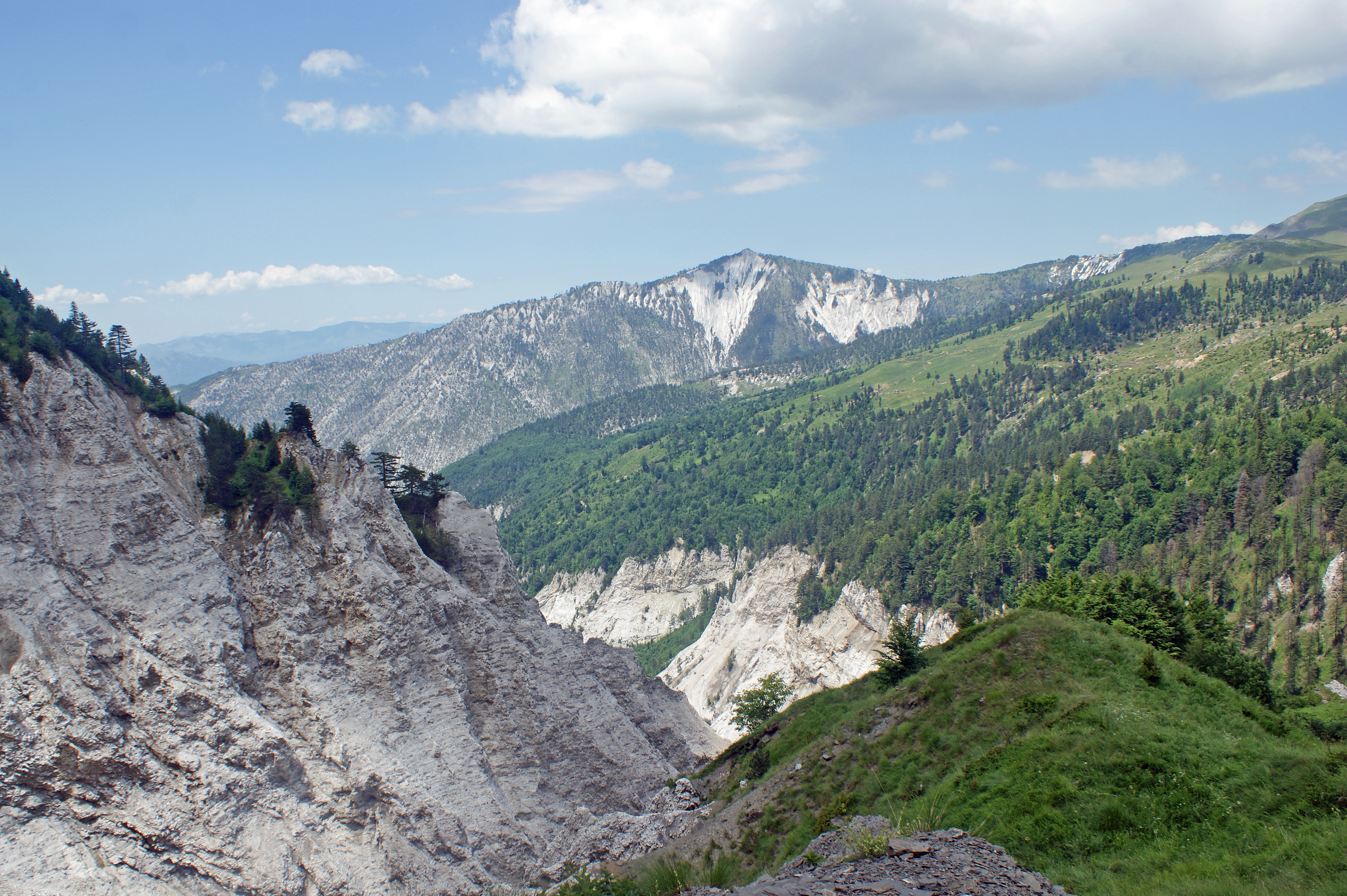
Mali i Bardhë in Korab-Koritnik Nature Park

Shtamë Pass National Park is mostly composed of dense forests, in which pine trees and oak dominate. Recently it is becoming an attraction for hiking.

Fir of Drenova National Park has a particular importance on the trans-boundary exchanges of flora and fauna elements, while it represents a key habitat and bio-corridor for a wide range of animals and plants. Tourists have often been attracted by the rock formations which are present and look unique.

Shebenik-Jabllanice National Park is one of the country’s newest national parks. It is particularly known for dwelling a number of different species that are fast becoming rare in the Balkans and hosting several glacial lakes within the mountains of Shebenik and Jabllanica.

Korab-Koritnik Nature Park encompasses the country's highest mountain Korab in the east which is shared with the Republic of Macedonia. Although in terms of geology, it is strongly composed of karst and limestone and high mountains. This has resulted in diverse topographic features within the boundaries of the park such as valleys, rivers, glacial lakes, caves and canyons.

Besides the beaches, the central region is abundant in lagoons and other natural ecosystems providing wonderful opportunities for those passionate about the study and observation of birds such as the Patoku Lagoon, Kune-Vain Lagoon and Narta Lagoon.

=== Southern Albania ===
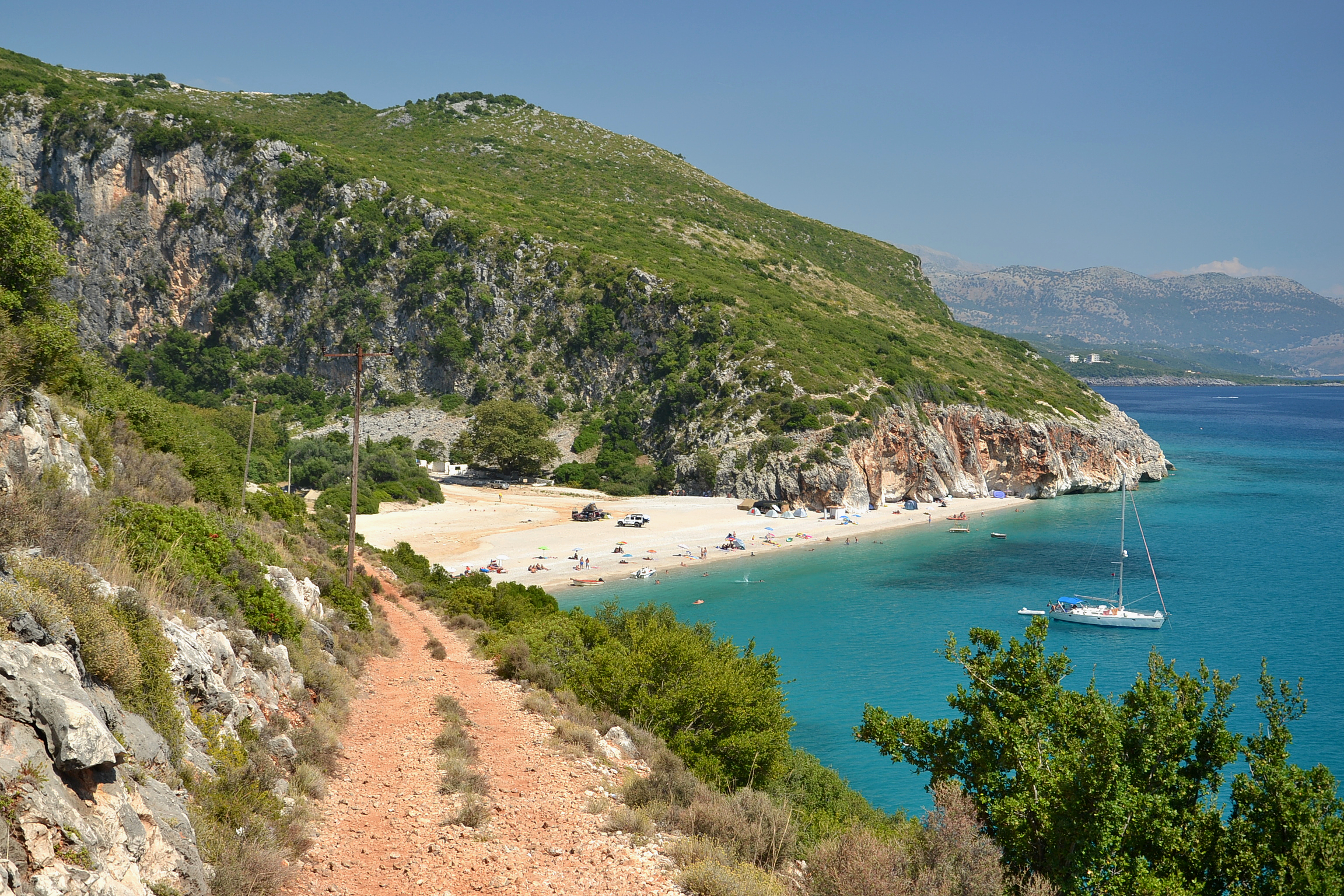
Gjipe Canyon, along the Albanian Riviera, is the meeting point of the Adriatic and Ionian Sea.

The southern region of the country is mostly mountainous and has become famous for its mediterranean atmosphere, diverse landscape, scenic coastline and villages and towns by the shoreline. The presence of several mountain ranges such as the Ceraunian and Pindus Mountains has ultimately shaped the diverse landscape of the south of Albania.

Stretching in the southwest, the Albanian Riviera is well known for its pure blue and turquoise beaches and has been a favorite destination for local and foreign visitors. Aside from its beaches, it is also a destination for relaxation, tranquility, and nightlife with several music festivals such as Kala Festival and a number of renown nightclubs. Many villages and towns in the area are nationally known such as Dhërmi, Lukovë, Palasë, Qeparo and Borsh.

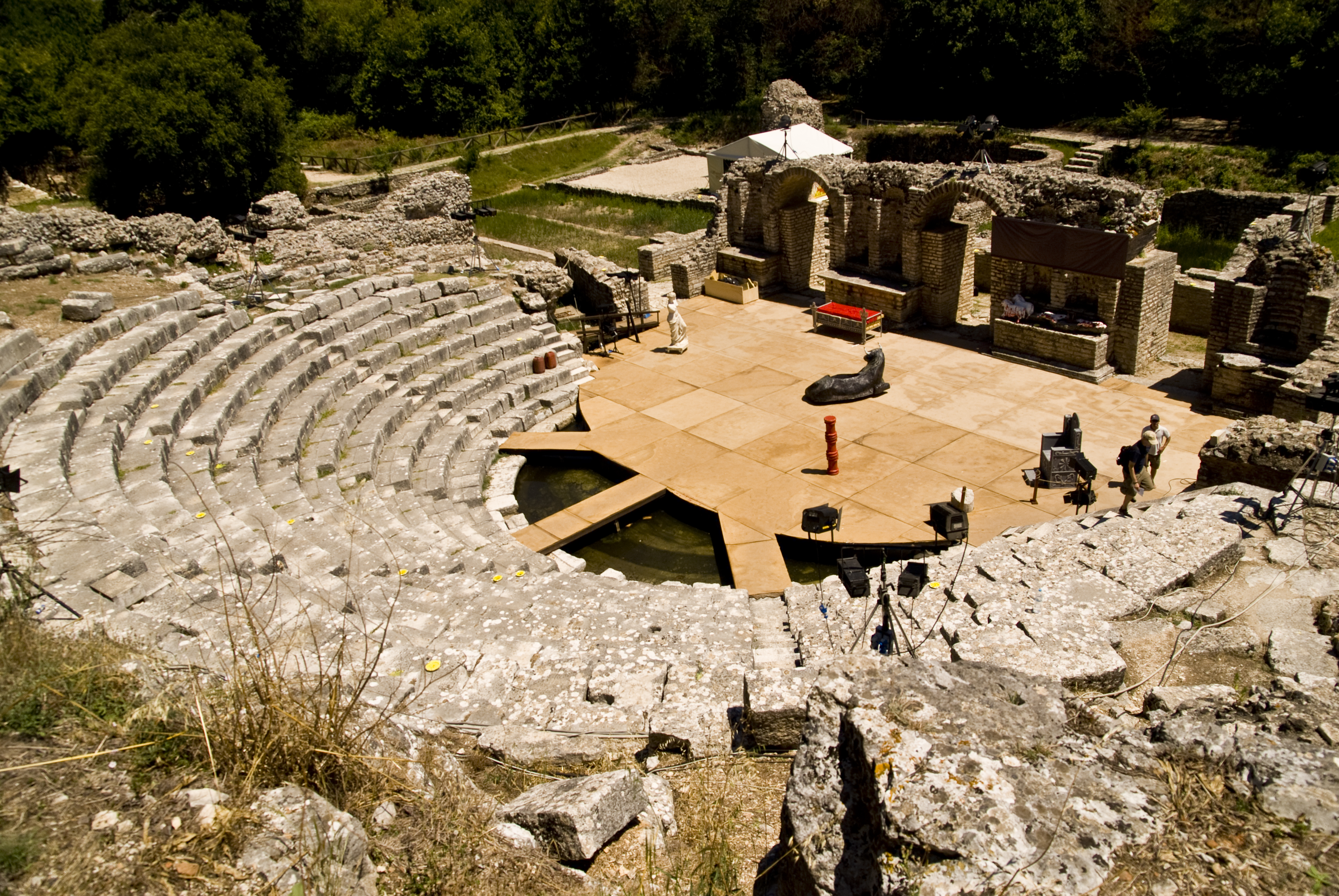
The theatre of Butrint with its Proscenium

Butrint is both a UNESCO World Heritage Site and National Park. The city lies in the south of Sarandë along the southern Albanian Ionian Sea Coast. Historically, it was inhabited since Prehistory but was founded as Greek and Roman colony during the Bronze Age. Numerous monuments are well-preserved today such as the ancient city walls, a baptistery, a great basilica, a theatre and castles. The remains are all located within a great natural woodland with a complex ecosystem and biodiversity, which depends on the nearby freshwater Lake Butrint as well as the direct proximity to the Mediterranean Sea. The combination of history, culture and environment makes Butrint a unique place, a landscape with monuments as beloved of the tourists.

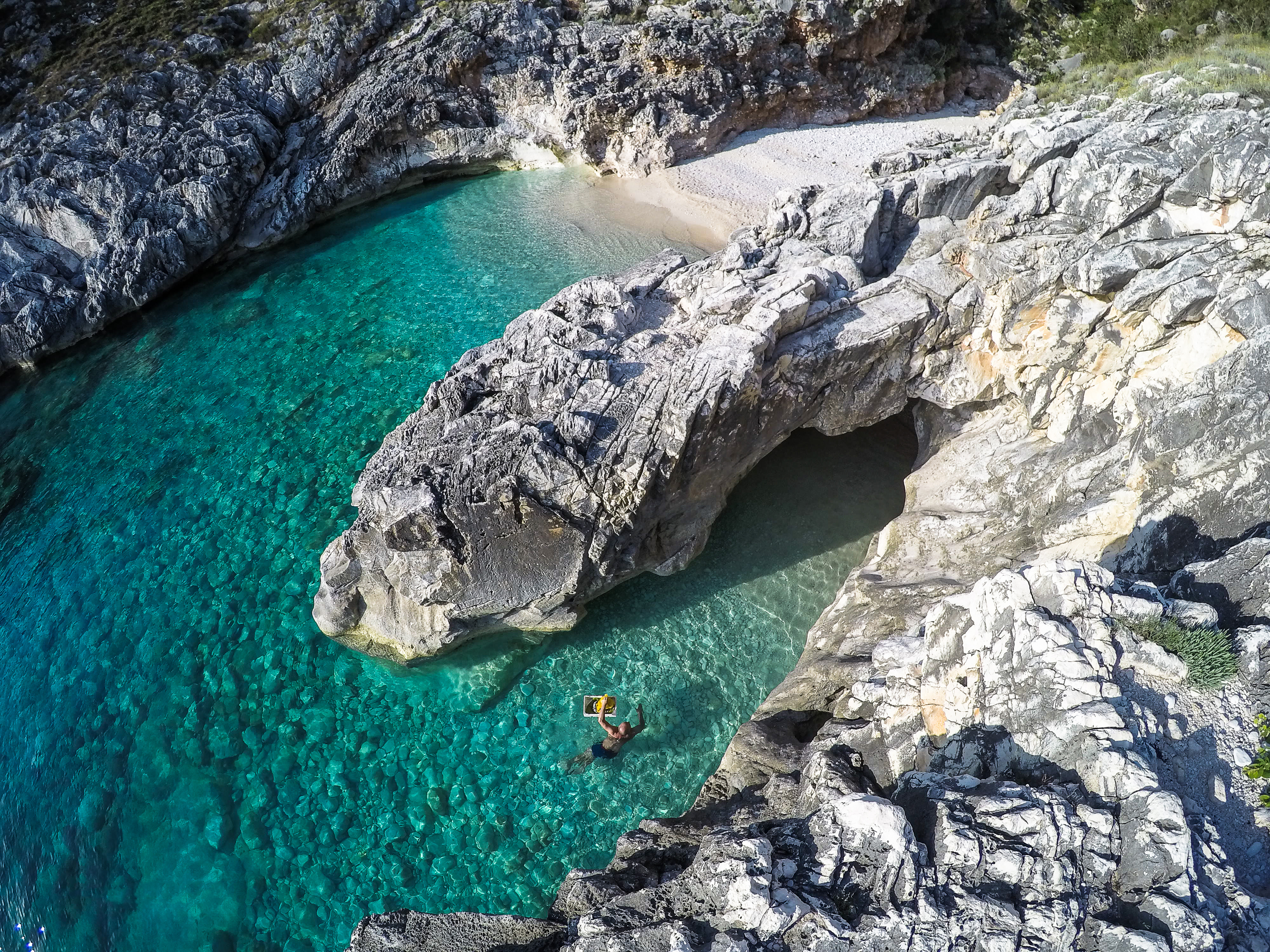
Gjiri Skalomës is one of several bays in Karaburun-Sazan Marine Park.

The Karaburun-Sazan Marine Park comprises the Karaburun Peninsula along with Sazan Island in southern Albania. Its terrain is characterized by mountains, caves, depressions, bays, canyons and wide beaches. Although it features ruins of sunken ships, a rich flora and fauna, ancient inscriptions, secluded beaches and scenic views of both the Adriatic and Ionian Sea.

Llogara National Park is well known for its diversified biodiversity and natural environment, which is relatively unaffected by human development. The mixture of refreshing high altitude mountain air at the Ceraunian Mountains and proximity to the Albanian Riviera makes it very attractive destination for tourists. The region is also important for the growth of ecotourism, hiking and paragliding.

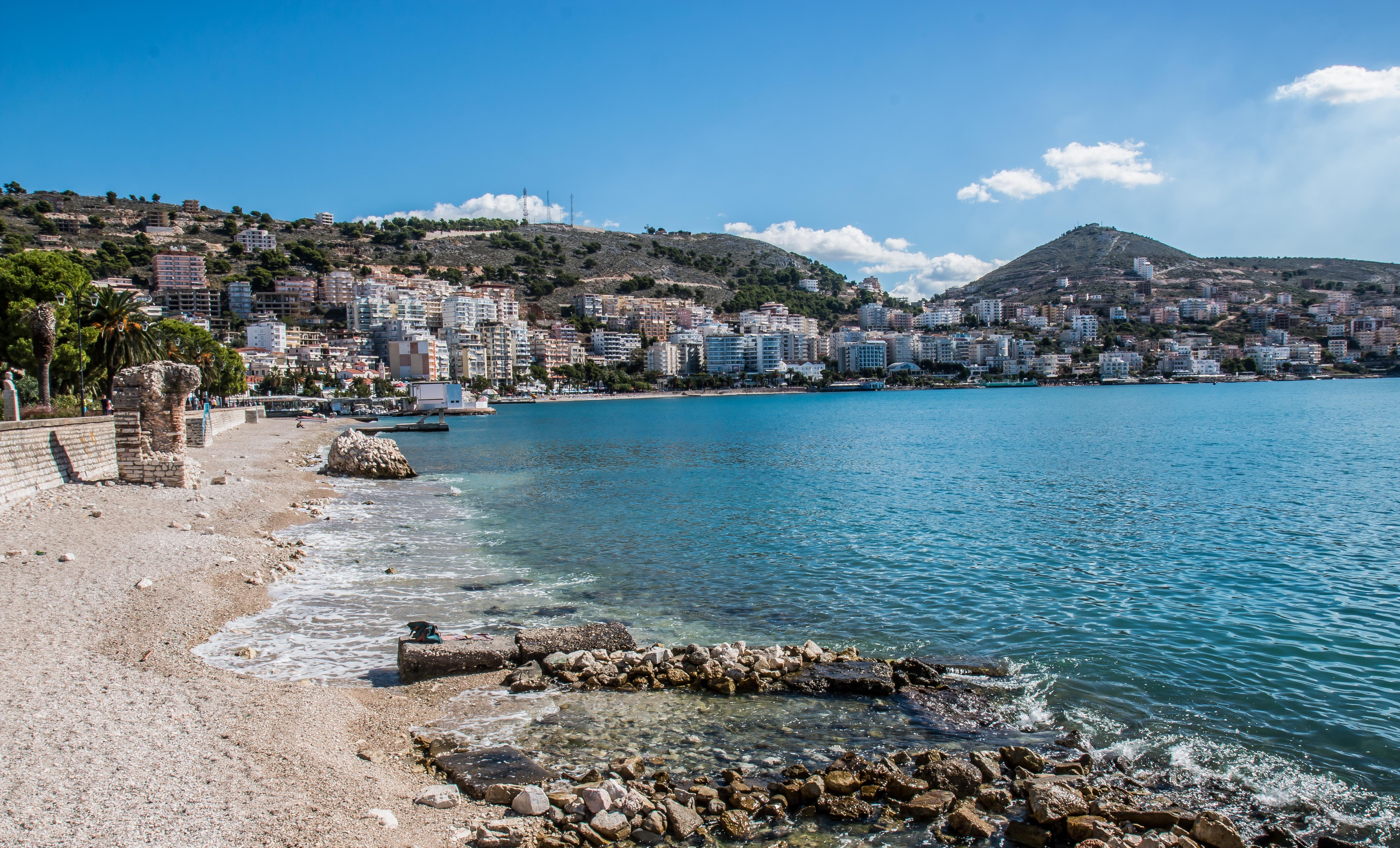
The waters of the city of Sarandë

Sarandë is a coastal town along the southern Albanian Ionian Sea Coast situated on a horseshoe bay between mountains and hills. The naturally occurring phenomenon of the Blue Eye Spring and architectural treasures such as Phoenice, the ancient city walls, ruins of a synagogue, a monastery and castle are among the most prominent attractions around the city.

Fir of Hotova-Dangell National Park is the country's largest national park and stretches within a remote mountainous region of Nemërçka and Tomorr between the Vjosa Valley in the west and the Osum Valley in the northeast. The narrow and deep Lengarica Canyon in Përmet with numerous caves and thermal springs such as Banjat e Bënjës are among the most visited areas in the park.

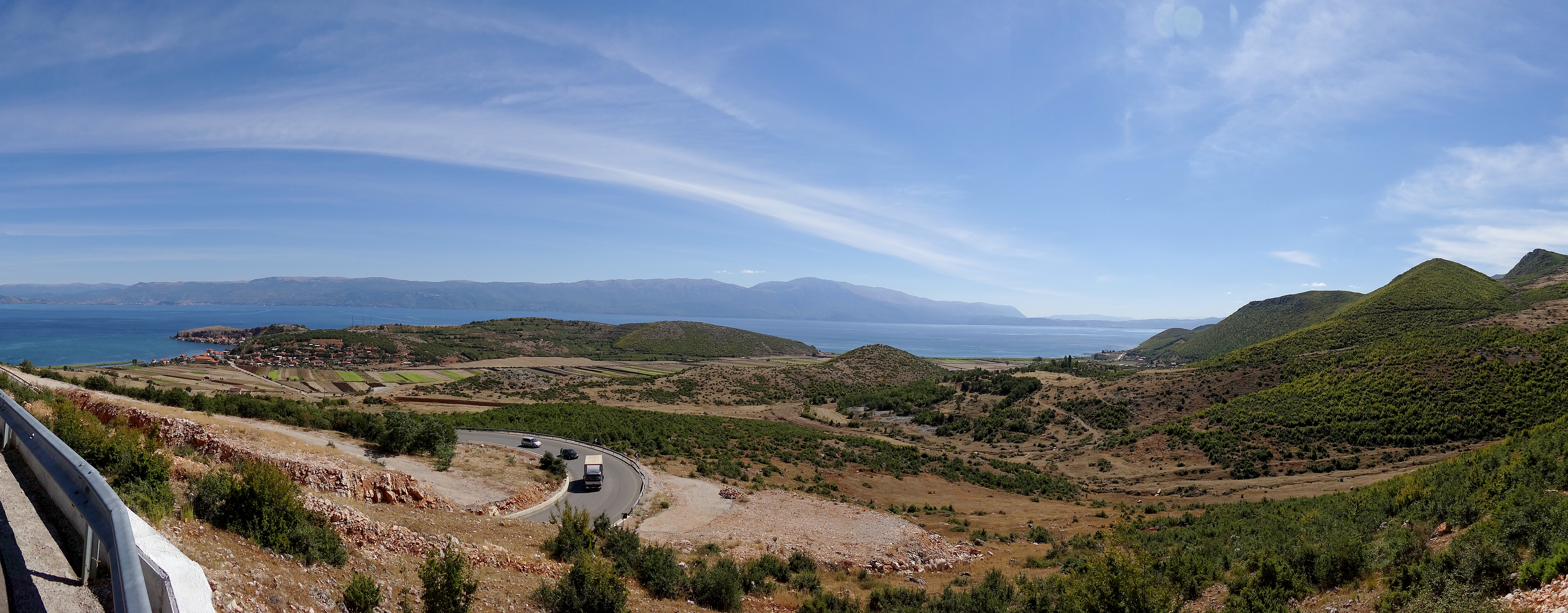
Panoramic view of Lin and Lake Ohrid

Pogradec and Lin straddles on the western shores of Lake Ohrid in the east. The lake is one of the most ancient lakes in the world and preserves a unique aquatic ecosystem that is of worldwide importance. Various monuments from different ancient civilizations are still evident in this region such as the Royal Illyrian Tombs, the Byzantine Churches of Lin and St. Marina.

Tomorr National Park encompasses Mount Tomorr in the south, which is in Albanian folklore anthropomorphized and associated with the legendary figure of Baba Tomor. Within the Osum Canyon, close to the national park, there are a number of rock formations, caves and waterfalls and are a spectacular natural attraction in the region.

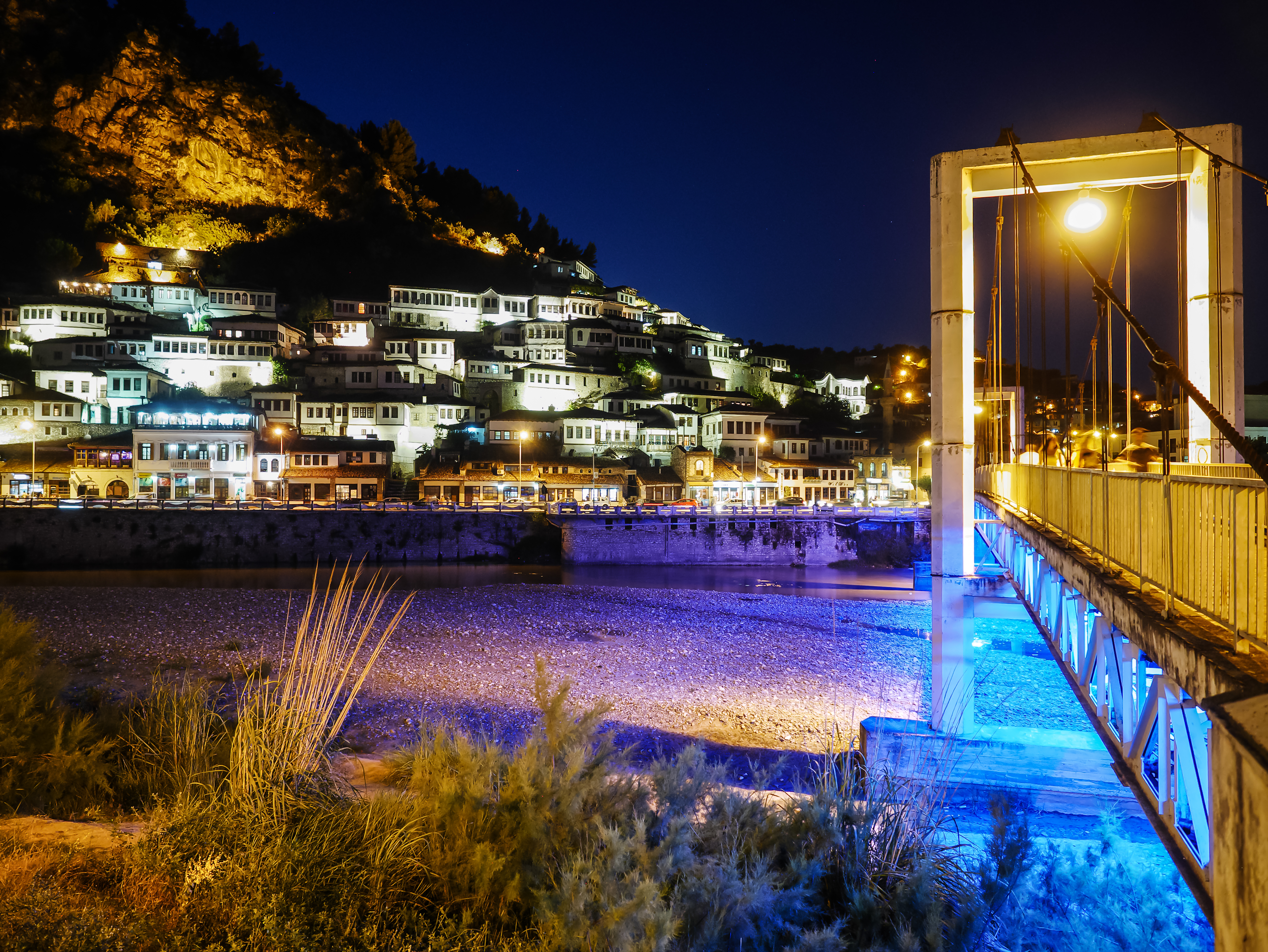
The city of thousand windows, Berat

Berat is one of the world's oldest continuously inhabited cities and is a UNESCO World Heritage Site. The city is known as a museum and city and also referred as the city of thousands of windows. Today, the city bears witness to the coexistence of various religious and cultural communities down the centuries. Treasures from the Illyrians, Romans, Greeks, Byzantines and Ottomans are still alive in the city. Among the attractions in the city and the surroundings are Byllis, Apollonia, Bachelors' Mosque, Berat Castle and Citadel, Gorica Bridge, Lead Mosque, Red Mosque, St. Theodore's Church, St. Mary of Blachernae Church, Dormition Cathedral and Ardenica Monastery.

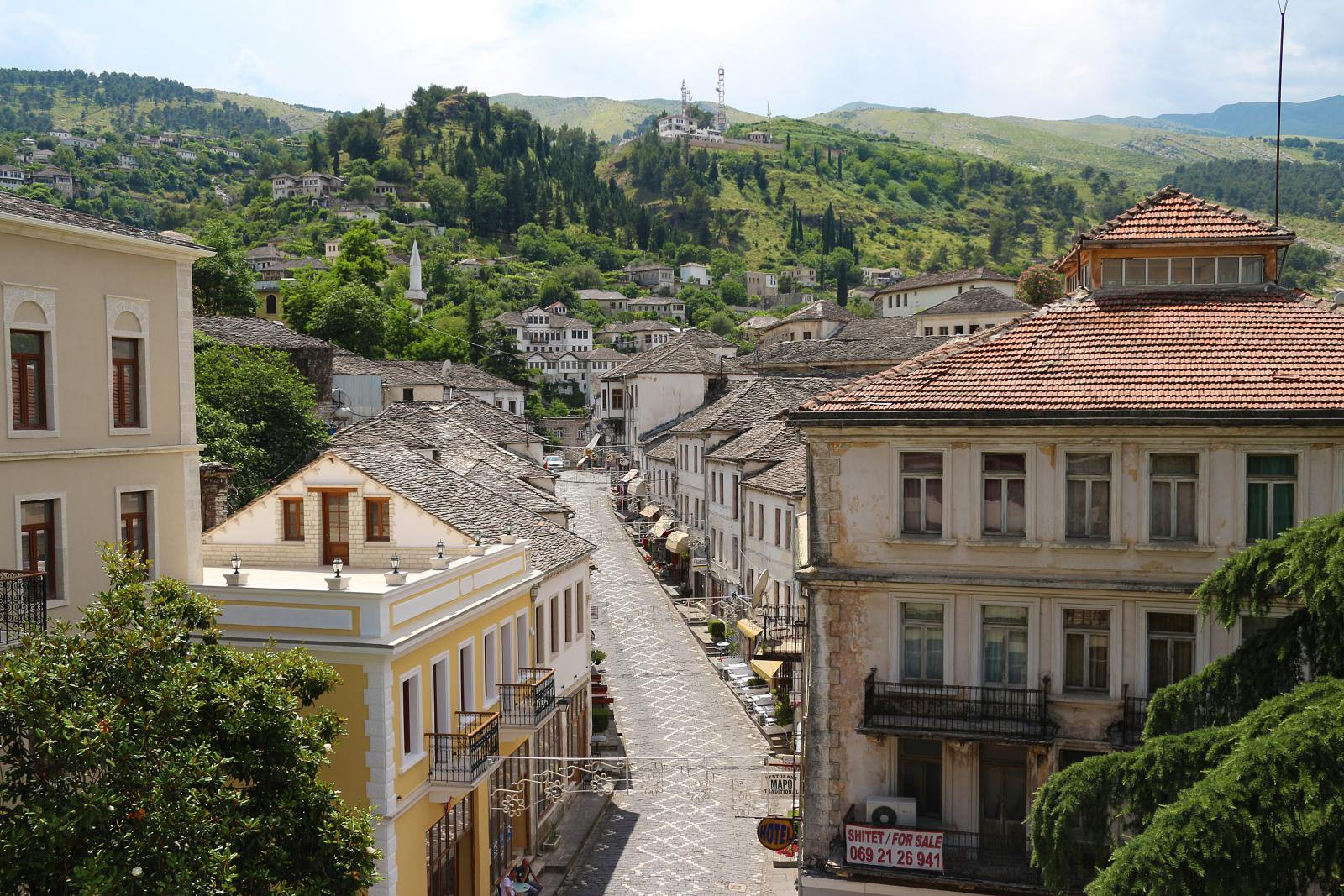
Gjirokastër is referred as the city of stone.

Gjirokastër is listed with Berat as a UNESCO World Heritage Site. The city is described as a rare example of a well-preserved Ottoman town, built by farmers of large estate. Typical houses consist of a tall stone block structures which can be up to five stories high. There are external and internal staircases that surround the houses. It is thought that such design stems from fortified country houses typical in the region.

Korçë is known for its quarters, composed of low houses and villas and many architectural buildings of various styles such as Historicism, Art Nouveau and Neoclassicism. Cultural elements from Albanians, Greeks, Italians and French merged within the city to create a unique culture. The largest carnival of Albania is here organized which takes place before Orthodox Easter. Among the most prominent sites in the city include the Illyrian Kamenica Tumulus.

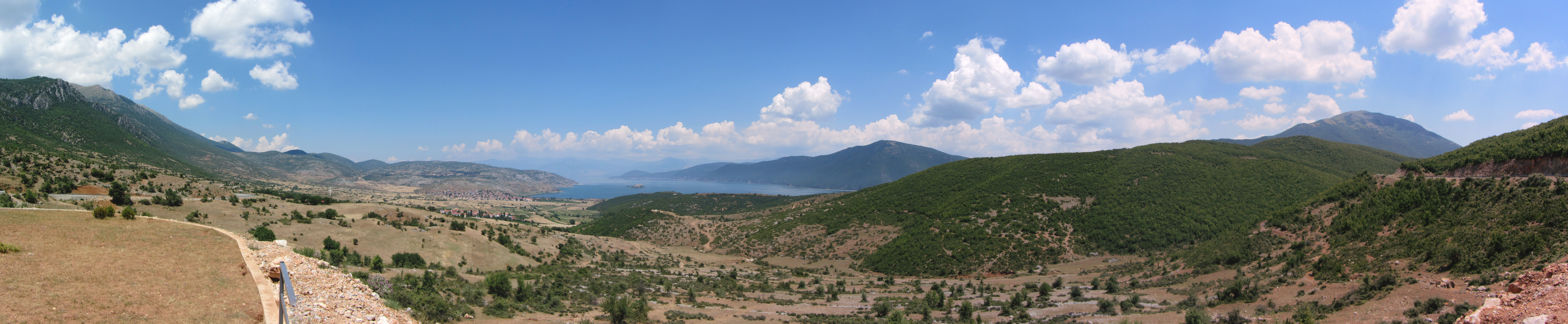
Scenic view of Prespa National Park and Maligrad

Voskopojë reached its peak in the 18th century and is nowadays considered a holy place by local Orthodox Christians. The remaining churches in the region are among the most representative of 18th-century ecclesiastical art in the Balkans.

Prespa National Park encompasses both Lake Prespa and Small Prespa Lake in the border triangle of Albania, Greece and Macedonia. The island of Maligrad, within the large Prespa, is dotted with a monastery and several caves, which are suitable for wildlife and a circular cliff. Hundreds of different species of animals and plants thrive in the national park.

== Attractions ==
=== Castles and forts ===
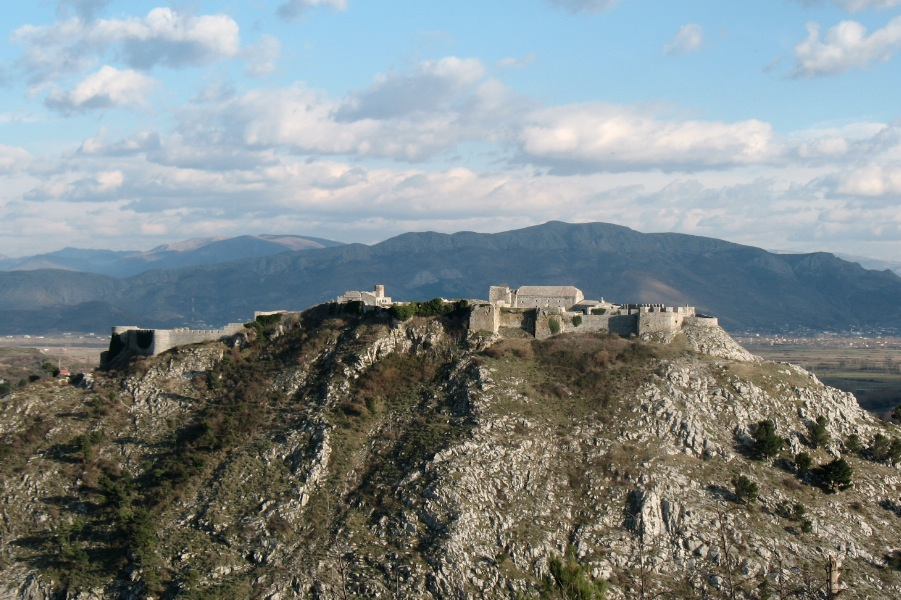
Rozafa Castle from distance

Albania's scenic landscapes are dotted with castles, forts and citadels. The castles and forts of the country constitute treasures and legacy of the historic past of Albania. From the early antiquity to the medieval period, they were originally made of earth and wood and later of stone and comes in many styles of architecture and design. The majority of forts have been renovated throughout history and different epochs with changing rule and adaptations to war technology development.

Rozafa Castle is an ancient castle and one of the most prominent sites in Shkodër. The castle is associated with a famous legend about a woman who was buried in the foundation of the castle. It stretches on a rocky hill and is trapped on three sides by the rivers of Buna, Kir and Drin. Shkodër served in the 4th century BC as the royal capital of the Illyrian tribes of the Ardiaei and Labeates. During that period, the castle was an Illyrian stronghold until it was captured by the Romans in 167 BC. Its current name, Rozafa, appeared for the first time in the early Middle Ages. Later when the Ottomans conquered the Balkans the castle then was turned into a mosque.

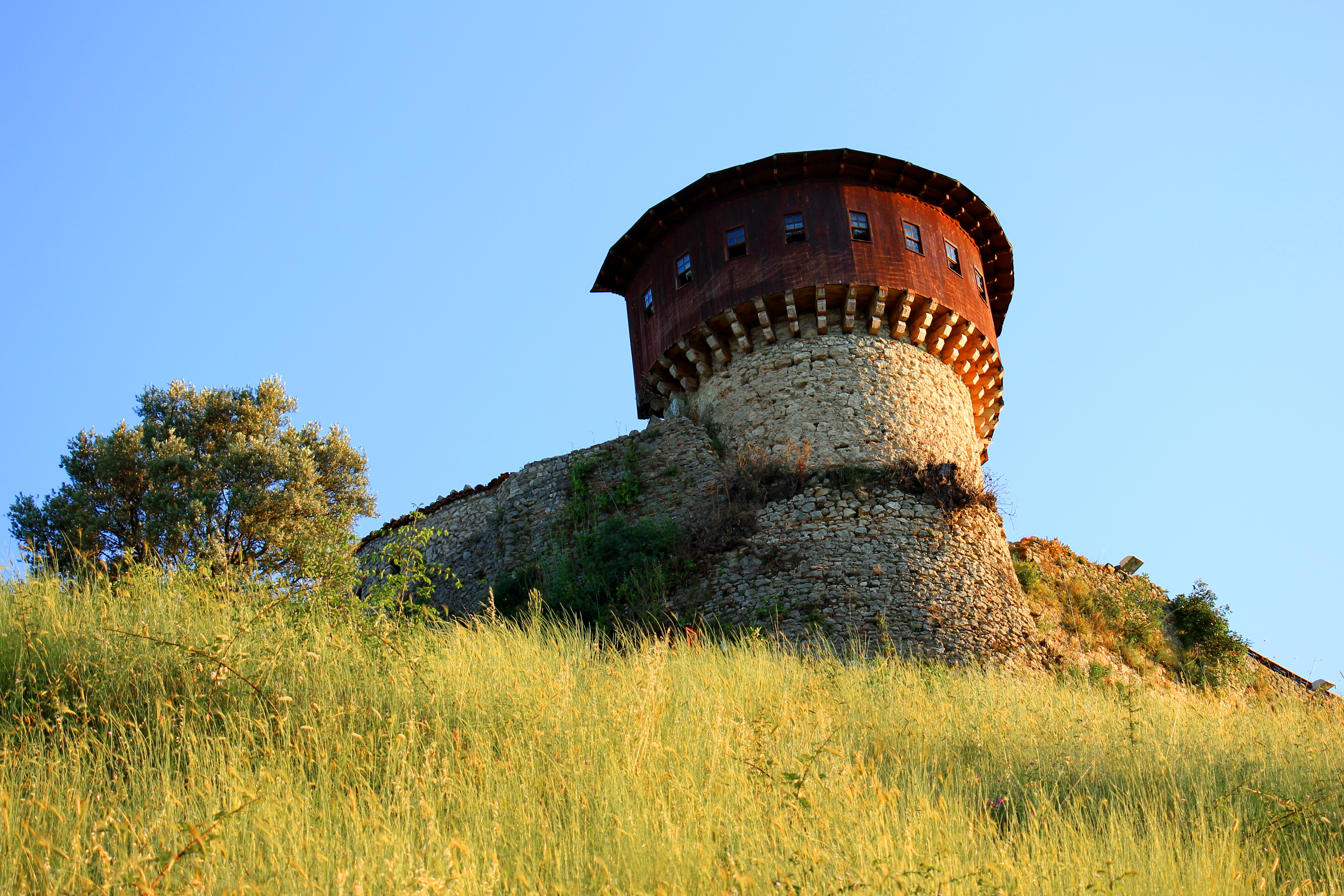
Petrelë Castle offers views over the Erzen Valley.

Petrelë Castle is a medieval castle close to Tirana located on a hilltop overlooking Petrelë and Erzen Valley. The castle has a triangular structure with two observation towers. The early fortifications probably date from the 3rd century, while in the 9th century it was expanded and served as a base for Gjergj Kastrioti Skënderbeu during its revolt against the Ottoman Empire.

Prezë Castle is a small fortification while the construction of which started in the 14th century and was completed in the early 15th century. It played a strategically important role for the region, especially in the Middle Ages, as it controlled the road from Durrës to Krujë and served as a point for the exchange of news between the castles of Petrelë and Krujë.

Ali Pasha Castle was built within a small island along the mouth of the Vivari Channel in Butrint National Park and is named after the Albanian ruler Ali Pasha of Ioannina, who ruled over the Pashalik of Yanina and even attempted to rival the Dey of Algiers in the seas. The castle is a small rectangular structure with battered walls, while along the corners, there are two battered round towers with cannons on its seaward side and two irregularly sized battered square towers equipped with firing loops or windows.

Rodoni Castle extend within the Cape of Rodon at the direct proximity to the Adriatic Sea. The name is derived from the Illyrian god of Rodon. Following the First Siege of Krujë and League of Lezhë decided to increase the fortifications for use against the Ottoman Empire. Skanderbeg chose the cape of Rodon as the location of the castle and construction began in 1450.

== Routes ==
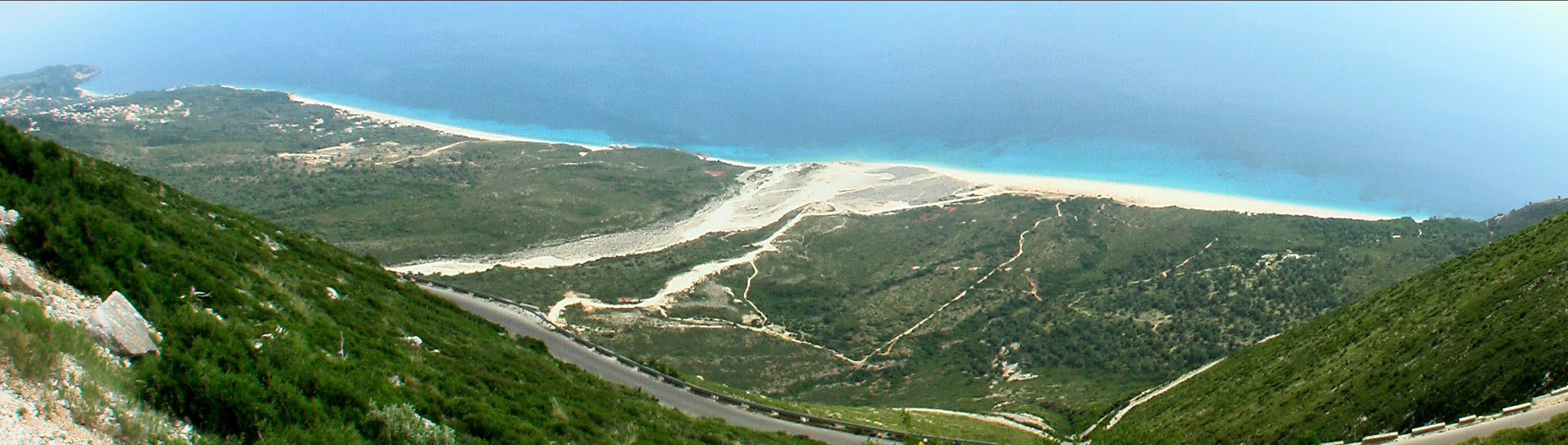
National Road 8 (SH8) running along the Llogara National Park

Due to the varying geographic elevation, Albania features endless panoramic routes along the mountainous region in Northern Albania as well as the Coastal region along the western lowland and the southern coast bordering both the Adriatic sea and the Ionian sea. The roadways along the beach are mostly new and in good condition.

One of the most renowned routes is the National Road 8 (SH8) from Vlorë to Sarandë in southwestern Albania along the Albanian Riviera starting from the port city of Vlorë into the Llogara Pass, being part of the Llogara National Park, and also along the Ceraunian Mountains. Towards the Llogara Pass the view becomes very spectacular and is one of the most picturesque routes in the Balkan Peninsula.

The A1 Motorway from Rreshen to Kalimash, connects Albania with Kosovo. It offers views of the Albanian mountains in the north along the Fan River Valley. Other routes consist of the SH78 from Jergucat to Delvinë along the Muzina Pass overlooking the Dropulli Plain, and the SH75 from Korçë to Ersekë and Përmet. The Via Egnatia served as a crossroad of important routes linking the Adriatic with Byzantium, today it is along the modern National Road 3 (SH3).

== Agritourism ==
The trend for agritourism is a form of tourism in the countryside which combines agriculture and tourism and is exponentially developing in Albania. The government of Albania has identified this form of tourism as an important and sustainable tourism opportunity and prioritised its development as a rural economic diversification concept within the country's 100+ villages Programme.

== See also ==
- Culture of Albania
- Economy of Albania
- Cuisine of Albania
- Architecture of Albania
- Dear Albania
