= Tomorr Mountain National Park =

National park and a tourist attraction in Albania

- Parku Kombëtar Mali i Tomorrit
- IUCN category II (national park)
- Official logo

- Location within Albania Location within Europe
- Location: Berat County, Elbasan County
- Nearest city: Berat, Poliçan
- Coordinates: 40°42′0″N 20°8′0″E
- Area: 27,185.5 hectares (271.855 km^{2})
- Designated: 18 July 2012
- Governing body: National Agency of Protected Areas

Tomorr Mountain National Park (Albanian: Parku Kombëtar "Mali i Tomorrit") is a national park founded in 1956 that lies in southern Albania, nestled in the central and higher portions of the Tomorr massif, spanning an area of 261.06 km^{2} (100.80 sq mi) since 2012, and expanded to include its quarry areas since 2019. The park covers a territory of 26,106 ha (64,510 acres). The area falls within the Berat County and only 1,278 ha (3,160 acres) inside the Elbasan County. The park was established in 1956 and is considered one of the most important protected areas for the maintenance of mountainous biodiversity and ecosystem integrity at the national level. The park has been recognised as an Important Plant Area of international importance by Plantlife.

Tomorr is an anticline composed of limestones and karst. The mountain is one of the highest natural points of southern Albania, rising between the valleys of the rivers Osum and Tomorrica in the east close to Berat.

The park falls within the Pindus Mountains mixed forests terrestrial ecoregion of the Palearctic Mediterranean forests, woodlands, and scrub biome. Its varied geology and topography have resulted in a unique diversity of flora and fauna. Forests of the Tomorri National Park are composed of diverse species of deciduous and coniferous trees and a great variety of flowers. The park's forests are abundant in species such as European beech, Bosnian pine, Turkish hazel, linaria, great yellow gentian, autumn crocus, Greek whitebeam, European mistletoe, centaury and many others. Numerous species of large mammals such as wolves, foxes, wild boars, roe deer, wild goats, rabbits, golden eagles, owles, and sparrowhawks can be found inside the national park. Small mammals include forest dormouse, and wood mouse.

Prominent features within the national park include the Osum canyon, Osum river and Tomorr massif, which is also a sacred site of both Christians and Bektashis.

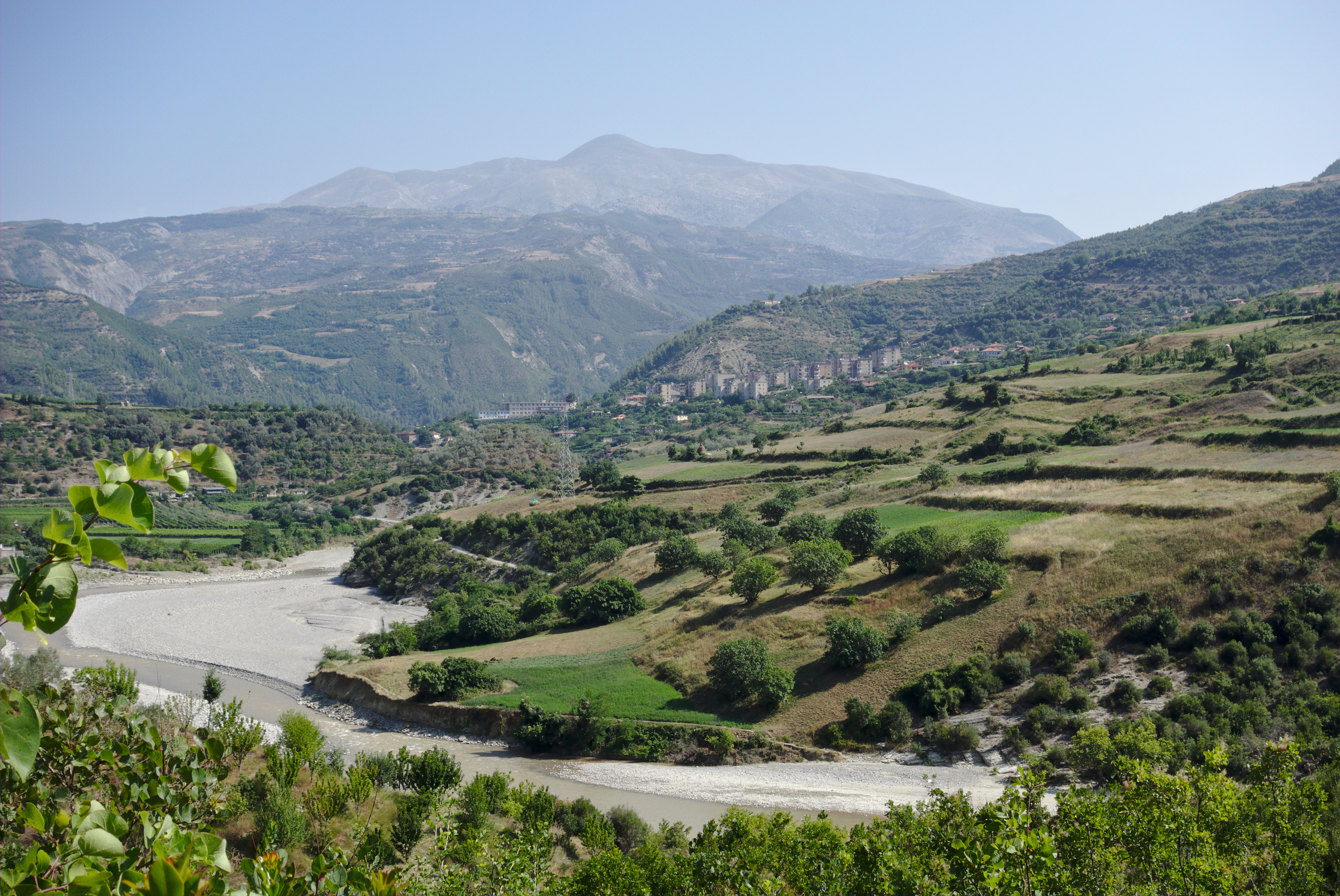
Osum river and Mount Tomorr in the background

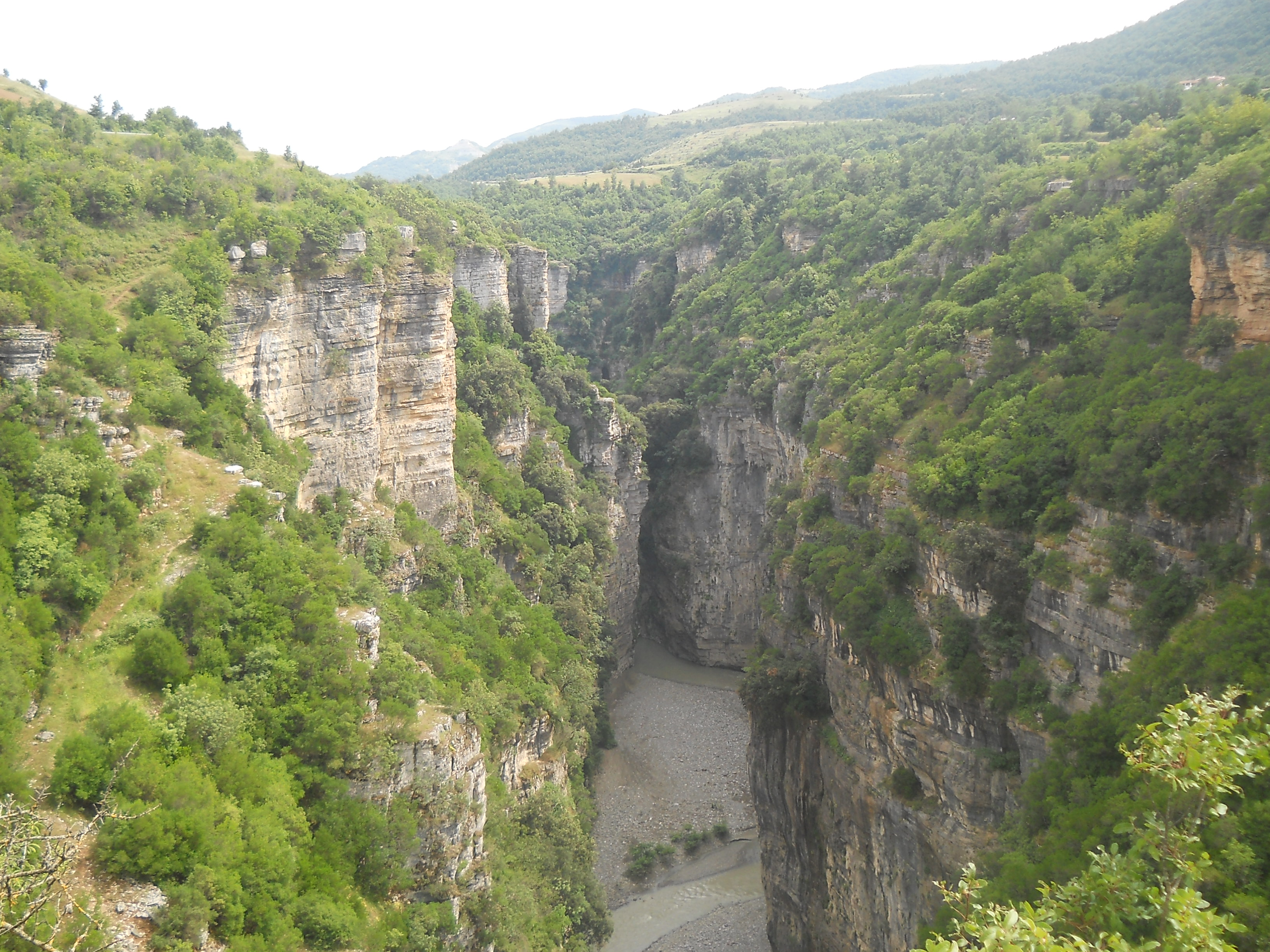
Osum canyon

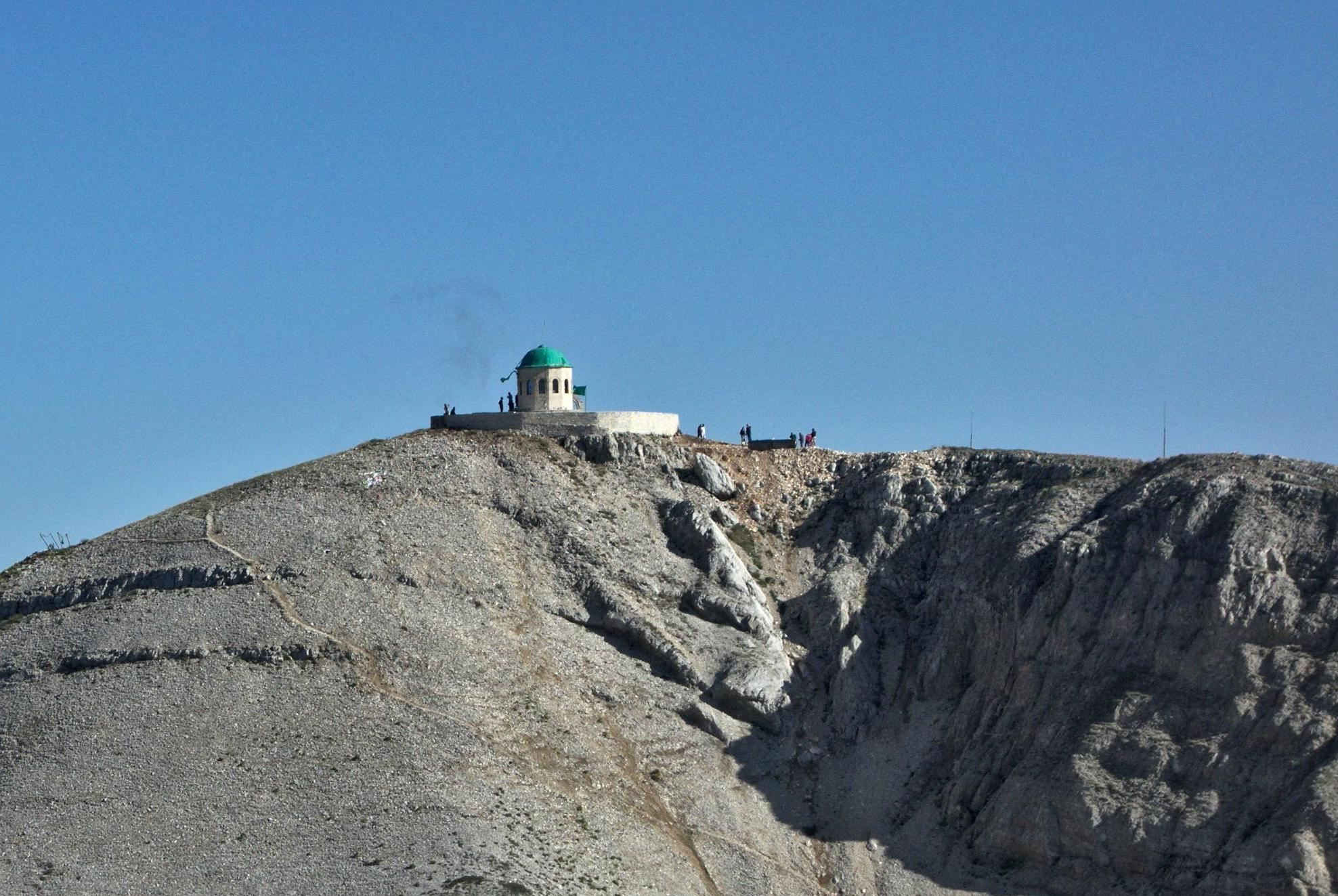
View of the tyrbe tombstone

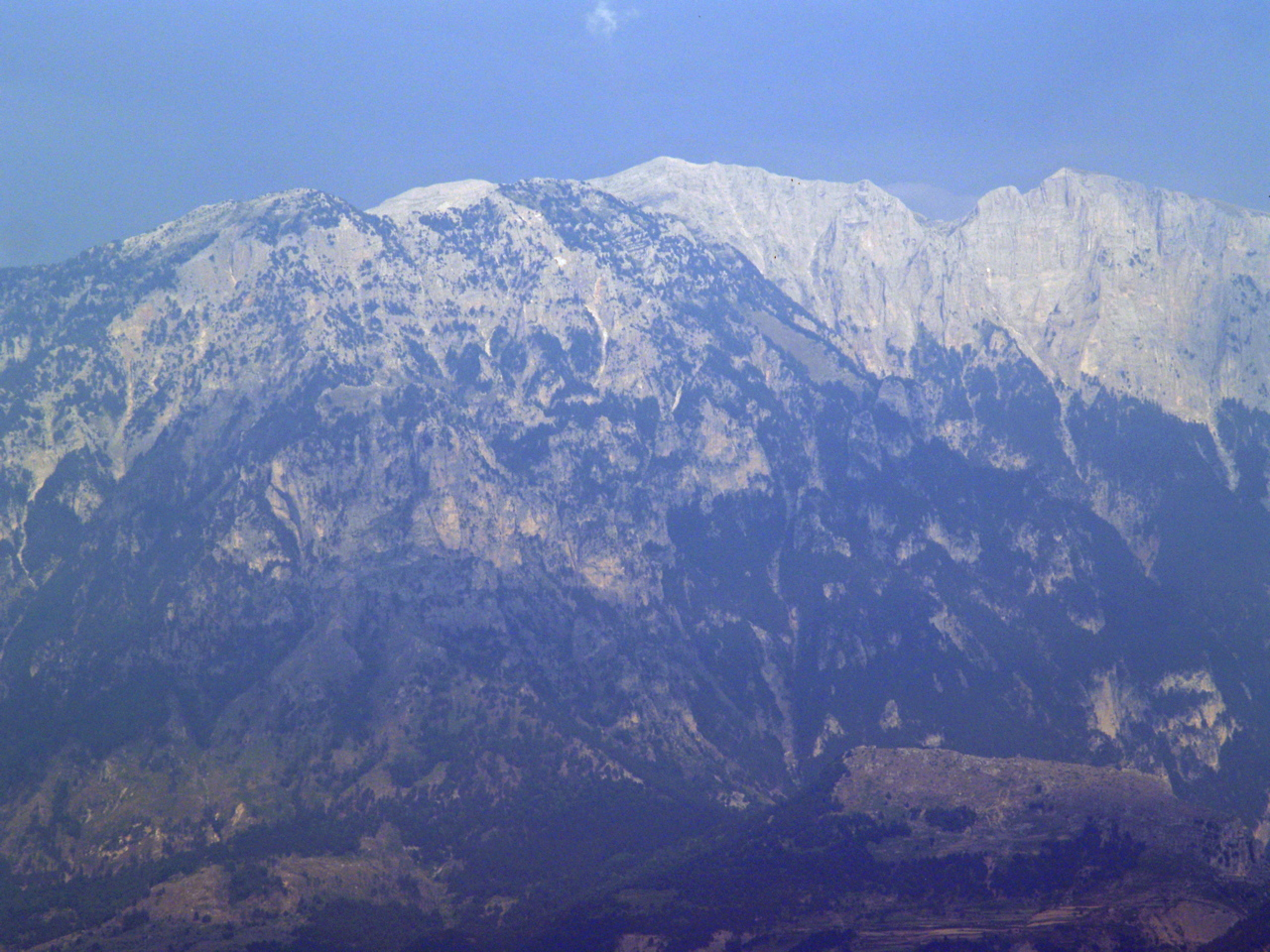
Tomorr massif

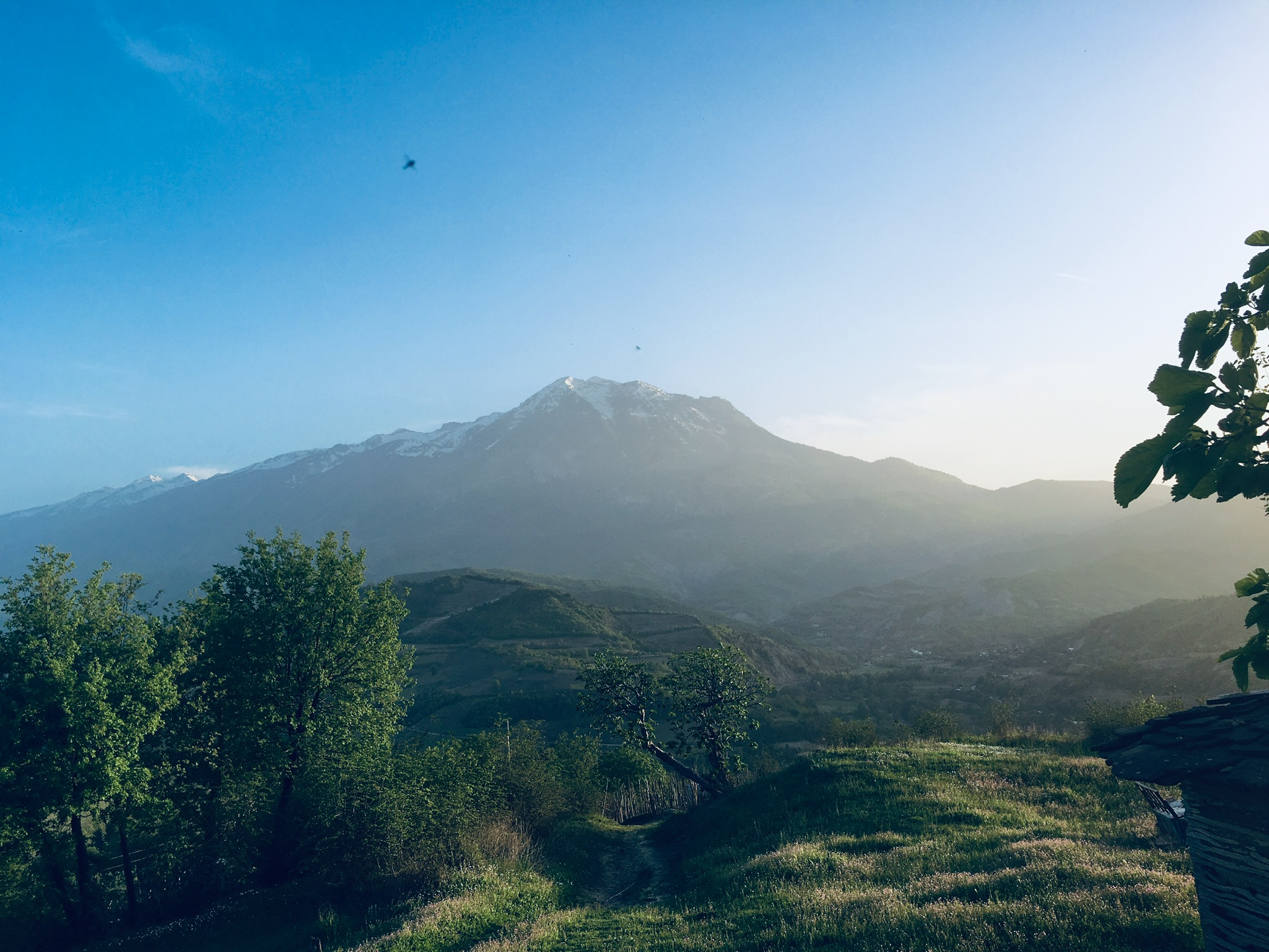

== See also ==
- Tomorr
- Geography of Albania
- Protected areas of Albania

== Bibliography ==
- Bollobani, Elvira; Uruçi, Rudina (2019). "Geotourism potentials of the National Park "Mali i Tomorrit"". International Journal of Geoheritage and Parks. 7 (1). Elsevier B.V. on behalf of Beijing Normal University: 15–23. doi:10.1016/j.ijgeop.2019.03.001.
