= Osum Canyon =

12 km long gorge at the Osum River

Coordinates: 40.47°N 20.255°E

The Osum Gorge (Albanian: Kanioni i Osumit) is a river gorge in southern Albania, near the town of Çorovodë. The river Osum, which passes through the town of Berat, flows through the canyon.

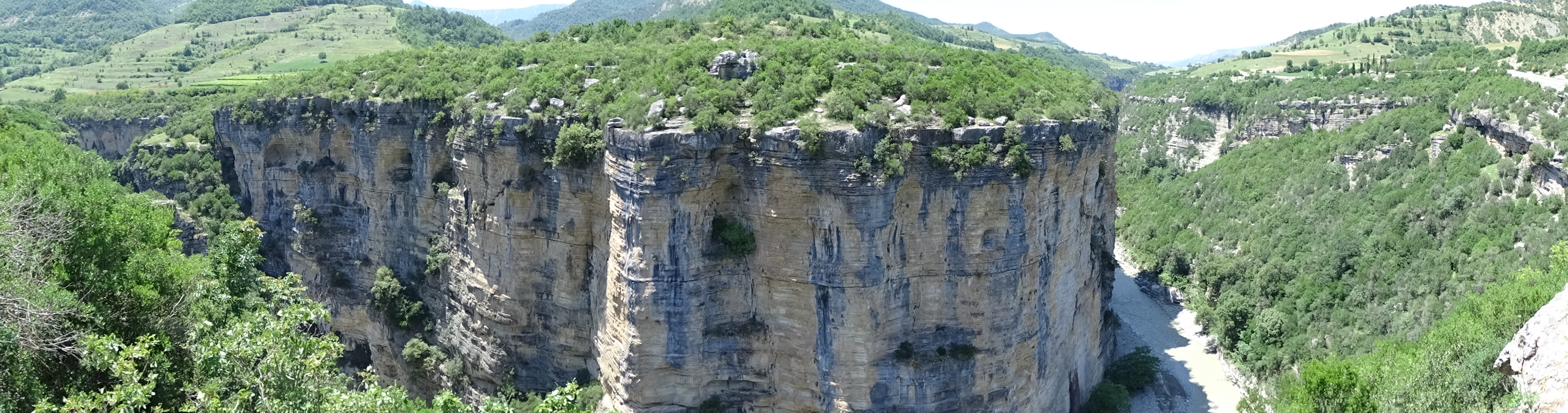
Panoramic view of Osum Gorge

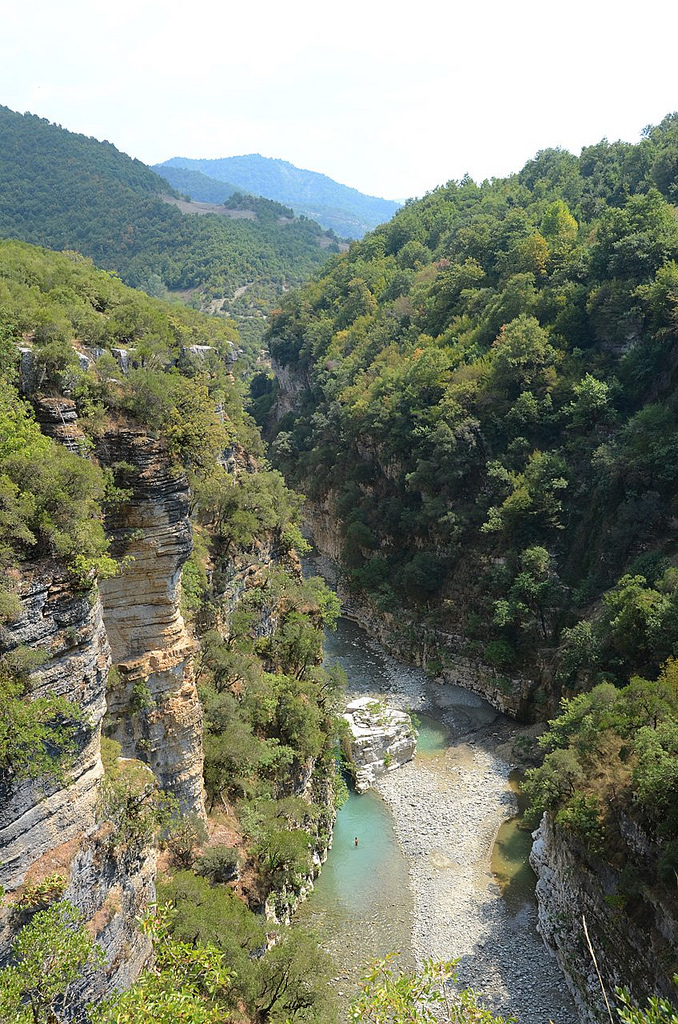
Osum Gorge in Skrapar District

The Osumi river gorge is one of the most spectacular natural attractions of Albania. During the spring, high water from melting snow makes it possible to explore the whole length of the gorge from the river. Spring is also the best time to view the many waterfalls in the gorges, which thunder from above as explorers pass below on boats. The rapids are Class II, so one does not need prior white water experience to navigate them. At the end of the summer, when the water is lower, the full length of the gorge is not navigable, but there are various walks with opportunities for swimming in various pools and streams.

The edges of the gorge have an unusual ecosystem that preserves the greenery on both sides of gorge year-round. Mediterranean bushes like heath and briar flourish along with a rich flora and fauna. On the slopes of the gorge, erosion has created pockmarked cavern walls with small caves. Some of the rock formations in the gorge have fanciful names such as the Cathedral, the Eye, and the Demon's Door.

The gorge is 26 km (16 miles) long, at an altitude of 450 m. They are thought to have been formed 2-3 million years ago by water erosion. There are many underground passages and unexplored caves throughout the length of the gorge. It is generally thought that many years ago the river flowed underground, but over time the rock above the river disappeared, creating the current form of the gorge. In the gulf of this gorge that is passed from Osum river in both its sides, outflow falls from different villages which pass in a rock chain. In the slopes of the gorge, erosion has created a rock chain, one of the rarest found in Albanian gorges.

The local inhabitants tell many interesting legends, such as those of Mulliri i Babait, Vrima e Nuses and Saint Abaz Ali.

The gorge includes six narrow sections ranging from 1.5 m wide in the riverbed up to 35 m wide further up the sides of the gorge.

== See also ==
- Tourism in Albania
- Rock formations in Albania
- Tomorr National Park
