= Osum =

River in southern Albania

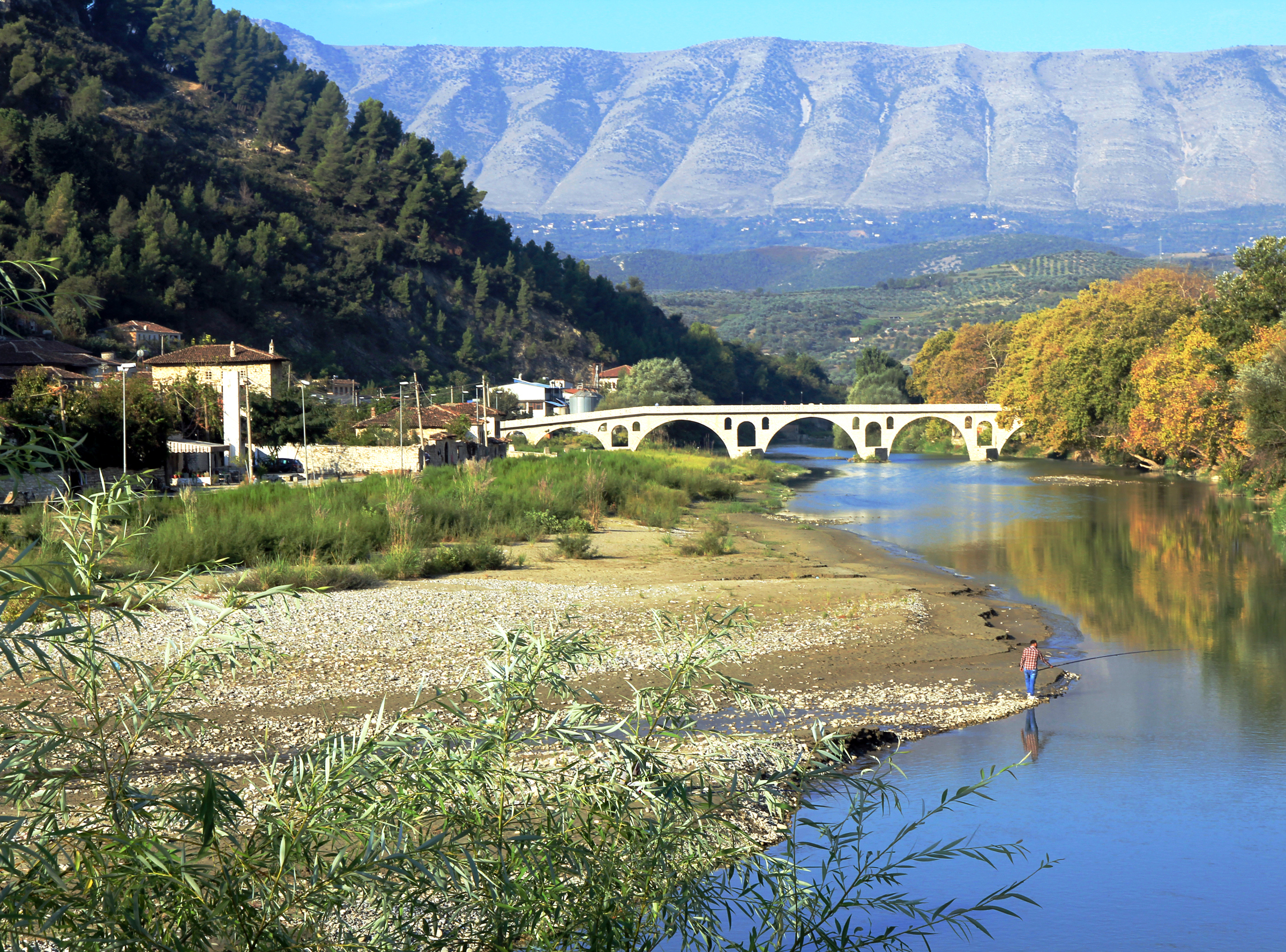
- Osumi overlooking the Gorica Bridge

Location
- Country: Albania

Physical characteristics
- Source
  - location: Western Vithkuq
  - coordinates: 40°32′10″N 20°29′29″E
  - elevation: 1,420 m (4,660 ft)
- Mouth
  - location: Seman near Kuçovë
  - coordinates: 40.8128°N 19.8588°E
- Length: 161 km (100 mi)
- Basin size: 2,073 km^{2} (800 sq mi)
- Discharge
  - average: 32.5 m^{3}/s (1,150 cu ft/s)

Basin features
- Progression: Seman→ Adriatic Sea

The Osum is a river in southern Albania, one of the source rivers of the Seman. It is 161 km (100 mi) long and its drainage basin is 2,073 km^{2} (800 sq mi). Its average discharge is 32.5 m^{3}/s (1,150 cu ft/s). Its source is in the southwestern part of the Korçë County, near the village of Vithkuq at an altitude of 1,050 metres (3,440 ft). It flows initially south to the Kolonjë municipality, then west to Çepan, and northwest through Çorovodë where it flows through the famous Osum Canyon, Poliçan, Berat and Urë Vajgurore. It joins the Devoll near Kuçovë, to form Seman River. The discharge of the river is reported to vary between 5.11 and 74.11 m^{3}/s (180 and 2,617 cu ft/s).

== Etymology ==
In classical antiquity, the Osum river was known as the Apsus, which is a derivative of the Indo-European root *ăp- "water, river". The Illyrian hydronym Apsus, corresponds to Apsias, a river name in southern Italy brought by Illyrian migrations (Iapygians) in the region.

== See also ==
- Geography of Albania
- List of rivers of Albania
