= Birvol =

Albanian grape variety

- Grape (Vitis)
- Color of berry skin: Pink
- Species: Vitis vinifera
- Origin: Albania
- Notable regions: Skrapar
- Notable wines: Rosé wine
- Formation of seeds: Seeded

Birvol (def. 'Birvoli') is a rare pink grape variety indigenous to the Berat region of south-central Albania. Thought to originate from Kapinovë, it is cultivated on a limited scale in the village of Fushë-Peshtan, where vineyards are planted at elevations of 500–700 m (1,640–2,300 ft), on the slopes of Mount Tomorr. The variety is noted for its pinkish skin and distinctive orange-hued flesh, characteristics that contribute to its unusual wine profile.

== Ampelography ==
Birvol is used mainly for the production of dry rosé wines. These wines typically range from pale pink to light ruby in color and show aromas of cherry, plum, wild berries and delicate flowers, with occasional notes of peach, herbs and light smoke. They are light- to medium-bodied, with a soft texture and lively acidity. Low tannin levels contribute to a smooth palate, while the finish is moderately persistent, with lingering red-fruit and floral notes.

Birvol rosé is commonly paired with Mediterranean dishes such as grilled fish, shellfish, poultry, salads and mild cheeses.

== Distribution ==
Cultivation of Birvol remains limited and largely confined to its traditional growing area around Leshnjë. Kantina Pupa is among the few wineries in the country presently cultivating and producing wine from this grape variety.

== See also ==
- Albanian wine
