= Tajka =

Albanian grape variety

- Grape (Vitis)
- Color of berry skin: Rouge, Blanc, Noir, Rose
- Species: Vitis vinifera
- Also called: Razaki, Korith, Ragabardhë
- Origin: Albania
- Notable regions: Many regions
- Breeding institute: IKPFV
- Formation of seeds: Seeded
- Sex of flowers: Hermaphrodite
- VIVC number: 12212

Tajka (also spelled Tajgë) is a widespread Albanian grape cultivar represented by several phenotypic forms, most notably "Tajka e Kuqe" (Red Tajka) and "Tajka e Bardhë" (White Tajka). Black and pink forms, known as "Tajka e Zezë" and "Tajka Rozë", have also been recorded.

The cultivar is characterized by vigorous growth, large berries and late ripening and is used primarily as a table grape.

== Etymology ==
The names Tajka and Tajgë are generally regarded as borrowings from South Slavic. In Gheg, the name is thought to derive from the Serbo-Croatian tamjanika and the Bulgarian tamyanka. Its modern Albanian form developed through elision of the original Slavic name, which in itself, ultimately derived from the Greek θυμίαμα (thymíama), meaning "incense".

== Parentage ==
Genetic analysis has shown that Tajka e Kuqe and Tajka Rozë share an identical SSR profile and are therefore considered color variants of the same grape cultivar. A similar genetic profile has also been identified in Parmak Cerven, a Turkish grape cultivar known under numerous synonyms.

Both grapes maintain a first-degree genetic relationship with Tajka e Bardhë and Muskat i Bardhë, as the two share one allele at each of the 21 genetic loci examined.

In addition, they appear to be implicated in the parentage of Kumbullor i Zi, which evidence indicates it being an offspring of Kosinjot and Tajka e Kuqe/Tajka Rozë.

== Distribution ==
Tajka has a relatively broad distribution throughout Albania. The red form has traditionally been cultivated in Tirana, Librazhd, Skrapar, Përmet and Mat, while the white form is documented in Tirana, Krujë, Mat, Shkodër, Elbasan and Librazhd. Tajka varieties are also reported in Mirditë, Lezhë, Durrës, Kavajë and the Myzeqe plain. Traditionally, the vines have been grown mainly on pergolas and trellises rather than in conventional vineyards.

== Ampelography ==
=== Tajka e Kuqe ===
Tajka e Kuqe is the more widespread of the two primary forms. Variation in berry color has resulted in a number of local forms and the cultivar is also known by the names Razaki e kuqe and Korith i kuq. A particularly distinctive form is Tajka e kuqe e Burrelit, which is considered one of the most representative examples of the cultivar.

The vine is vigorous and develops shoots with long internodes. Its leaves are large and pentagonal, usually with seven lobes, slightly overlapping lateral lobes and a closed petiolar sinus. The flowers are functionally female and the shoots generally bear no more than one inflorescence. Bunches are large and elongated with medium compactness. The berries are large and oval, with red skin covered by a light waxy bloom. The skin is moderately thick and the berries generally contain one seed, occasionally two.

The cultivar is productive, largely because of the size of its bunches. Its basal buds are poorly differentiated, making long or mixed pruning preferable. Because the flowers are functionally female, the vines benefit from being planted alongside cultivars that provide effective pollination.

Tajka e Kuqe ripens late and normally accumulates about 15–18% sugar. Under favorable autumn conditions, bunches may remain on the vines until November. The cultivar is susceptible to downy mildew but shows greater resistance to powdery mildew and bunch rot. It is considered suitable for lowland and coastal areas at elevations of up to 700 m above sea level. Kober 5BB and SO4 are among the rootstocks recommended for its cultivation.

=== Tajka e Bardhë ===
Tajka e Bardhë is less widely cultivated than the red form. It is known as Razaki e bardhë or Ragabardhë and has traditionally been grown primarily on pergolas and trellises.

The vines are vigorous, with long internodes and large pentagonal leaves. The leaves generally have five lobes and an open petiolar sinus. As in the red form, the flowers are functionally female. Bunches are medium-sized, broad and moderately compact. The berries are large, with a green to yellowish-green color and a slight waxy bloom. They have thin skin and juicy flesh and normally contain one seed, although two may occasionally occur.

Long and mixed pruning systems are preferred because the basal buds show weak differentiation. The cultivar produces best when grown in association with suitable pollinating varieties. It is susceptible to downy mildew, powdery mildew and prolonged drought, but the grapes can remain on the vine beyond their normal harvest period when weather conditions are favorable.

Tajka e Bardhë is a late-ripening cultivar and typically reaches a sugar concentration of about 16–19%. It is considered most suitable for lowland and coastal municipalities at elevations of up to 600 m above sea level.

== Usage ==
Both Tajka e Kuqe and Tajka e Bardhë are cultivated primarily for fresh consumption. Their large berries, favorable eating qualities and resistance to damage during transportation make them suitable as table grapes. Their late ripening also extends the period during which locally grown fresh grapes are available, particularly when dry autumn weather allows the bunches to remain on the vines after reaching maturity.

== See also ==
- Albanian wine
