= Kotekë =

Albanian grape variety

- Grape (Vitis)
- Color of berry skin: Blanc, Noir
- Species: Vitis vinifera
- Origin: Albania
- Breeding institute: IKPFV
- Formation of seeds: Seeded
- Sex of flowers: Hermaphrodite
- VIVC number: 6442

Kotekë (lit. 'Henhouse') is the name given to two indigenous Albanian grape cultivars, "Kotekë e Bardhë" (White Kotekë) and "Kotekë e Zezë" (Black Kotekë). Traditionally cultivated in southern and southeastern Albania, where the vines are grown on pergolas and trellises, the grapes are consumed fresh and used for winemaking and distillation.

== Ampelography ==
=== Kotekë e Bardhë ===
Kotekë e Bardhë is a white grape cultivated in Ersekë, Skrapar, Përmet, Pogradec and Leskovik. It ripens between 20 August and 10 September. At harvest, the grapes contain approximately 18% sugar and 5.1–5.4 g/L of tartaric acid.

The vines are trained on pergolas and trellises. The grapes are eaten fresh and used in the production of household white wine, rakia and grape brandy.

Kotekë e Bardhë is preserved in the Albanian Genebank grapevine repository under accession code AGB3440, using plant material sampled from the Përmet region.

=== Kotekë e Zezë ===
Kotekë e Zezë is a dark-skinned grape traditionally found in Leskovik, Përmet, Tepelenë and Gjirokastër. As with Kotekë e Bardhë, the vines are trained on pergolas and trellises.

Ripening occurs between 15 August and 15 September, with the timing varying according to the growing area and elevation. At maturity, the grapes contain approximately 23–24% sugar and 7–7.3 g/L of tartaric acid. They are consumed fresh and used for household red wine, rakia and grape brandy.

== Parentage ==
Genetic research has called into question the classification of Kotekë e Zezë as a distinct cultivar. In a molecular study of traditional southeastern European grapevines using microsatellite markers, an Albanian accession of Kotekë e Zezë was found to have an identical genetic profile to Debinë e Zezë. This finding indicates that Kotekë e Zezë may be a regional synonym or alternative name for Debinë e Zezë rather than a genetically distinct cultivar.

Despite the genetic similarity, Kotekë e Zezë has traditionally been documented separately in Albanian viticultural literature, with its own recorded distribution, ripening period, grape composition and uses.

== See also ==
- Albanian wine
