= Shesh (grape) =

Albanian grape variety

- Grape (Vitis)
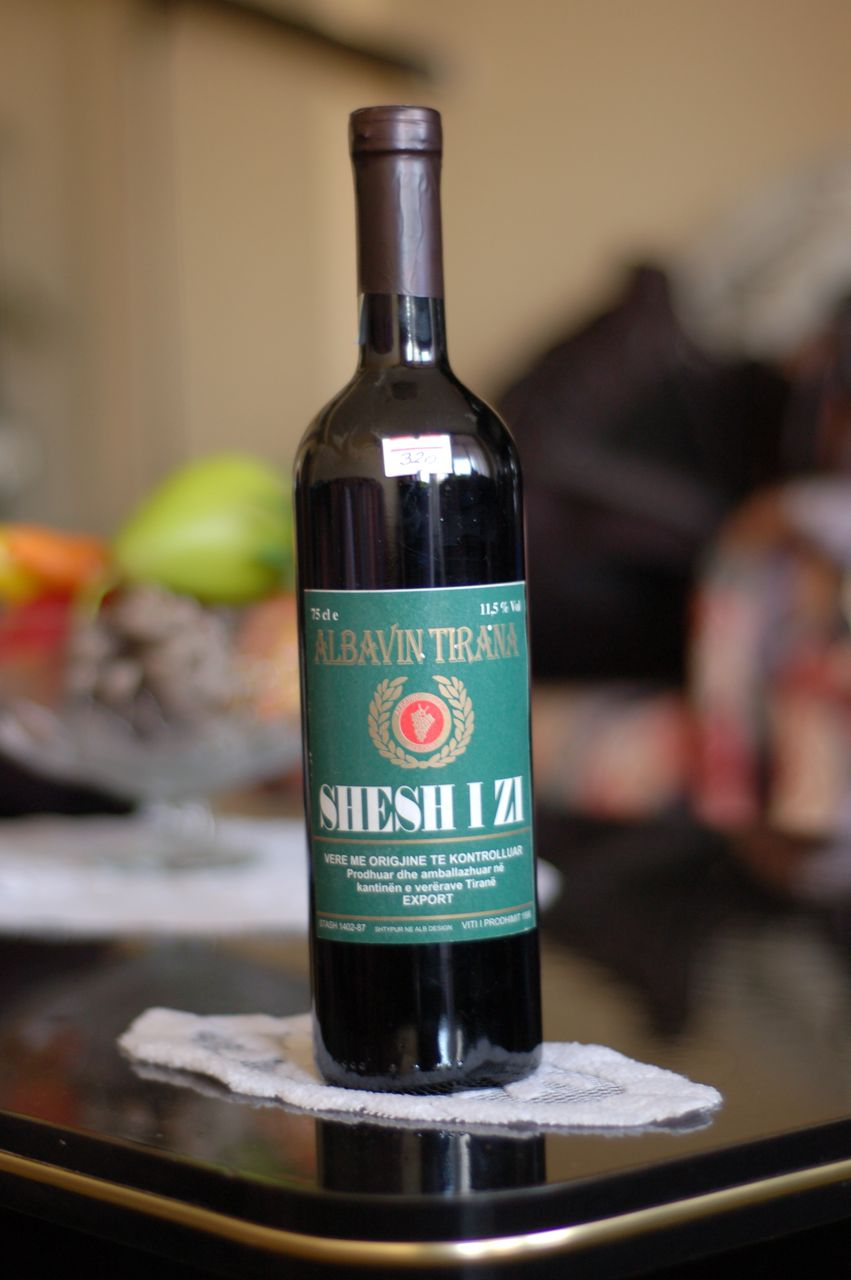
- A bottle of Shesh i Zi
- Color of berry skin: Blanc, Noir
- Species: Vitis vinifera
- Origin: Albania
- Notable regions: Tirana, Durrës, Kavajë
- Notable wines: Shesh wine
- Breeding institute: IKPFV
- Formation of seeds: Seeded
- Sex of flowers: Hermaphrodite
- VIVC number: 11532

Shesh (lit. 'Open plain') is an indigenous Albanian grape variety belonging to the species Vitis vinifera. It occurs in two forms: Shesh i Bardhë and Shesh i Zi, both originating from the village of Shesh, west of Tirana.

As the dominant cultivars of central Albania, these grape varieties, when combined, account for approximately 60% of the country’s overall vineyard area.

== Production ==
Shesh i Bardhë is believed to have originated as a natural mutation of Shesh i Zi. Each cultivar is well adapted to the Mediterranean climate of the region and perform best at elevations of up to 500 m (1,300–1,600 ft) above sea level.

The vines thrive in deep, well-drained, rocky or calcareous soils and are capable of producing fruit of high quality under diverse growing conditions. In the hilly vineyards surrounding the village of Shesh, the steep terrain makes mechanical harvesting impractical and grapes are typically harvested by hand.

Manual harvesting allows careful selection of the fruit before it is transported in wooden or plastic crates to wineries.

== Ampelography ==
=== Shesh i Bardhë ===
Shesh i Bardhë is a robust grapevine with green shoots that turn light brown during autumn. The leaves are medium-sized, five-lobed and broadly pentagonal, with a slightly open petiolar sinus. Its flowers are hermaphroditic, with shoots bearing between 1.1 and 2 inflorescences.

The clusters are medium-sized and moderately compact, weighing approximately 300–400 g. Berries are round and medium-sized, developing a green to yellowish-green color as they mature. They have juicy flesh, seeds and a thin waxy coating on the skin.

Shesh i Bardhë can produce high yields, particularly when cultivated in fertile, well-managed soils. Average production ranges from 3 to 4 kg of grapes per vine, or approximately 11.5–12.0 tonnes per hectare. It is compatible with several rootstocks, including Chasselas × Berlandieri 41B, Kober 5BB and 1103 Paulsen. The fertility of its basal buds allows for consistent production under different pruning systems.

The variety is well adapted to the lowland and coastal regions of Albania. It ripens relatively late, with the harvest taking place between 20 and 30 September. At maturity, the grapes typically contain 23–25% sugar, although levels can reach around 27% in favorable years. Wines produced from Shesh i Bardhë have an alcohol content ranging from 9.5 to 13.5% and total acidity of 4.8–7.8 g/L.

=== Shesh i Zi ===
This variety is vigorous, with medium-sized, five-lobed leaves and large, moderately compact clusters. Its round, medium-sized berries have dark blue to black, moderately thick skins covered with a waxy bloom and contain two to three seeds.

Shesh i Zi performs well in deep, loose, calcareous soils and is suitable for both short and mixed pruning. Flowering occurs around late May, with the grapes generally ripening in the second half of September. At maturity, they contain about 63% juice, 18–20% sugar and 6.4–6.7 g/L of tartaric acid. The cultivar is susceptible to fungal diseases, moths and grey mould.

== Usage ==
Shesh i Bardhë is used primarily for the production of dry white wines, while Shesh i Zi is vinified into ruby-red table wines. Both cultivars are also utilized in the production of artisanal rakia and wine vinegar.

The grapes are eaten fresh during the harvest season and can also be processed into grape juice, vinegar and traditional grape jam. The jam is prepared by slowly cooking peeled grapes with sugar until thickened and is traditionally preserved in glass jars for winter consumption. It is commonly served with bread and butter as a breakfast food.

Red wine vinegar produced from Shesh i Zi is widely used in Albanian cooking, particularly in marinades and meat dishes.

== See also ==
- Albanian wine
