= Pulëz =

Albanian grape variety

- Grape (Vitis)
- Color of berry skin: Pale greenish golden
- Species: Vitis vinifera
- Also called: Verdhëza, Landari
- Origin: Albania
- Notable regions: Berat, Përmet
- Notable wines: Shëndevera sparkling wine
- Breeding institute: IKPFV
- Formation of seeds: Seeded
- VIVC number: 27102

Pulëz (lit. 'Hen'), also known as Verdhëza or Landari, is a white grape variety indigenous to central and southern Albania. Regarded as one of the country’s oldest cultivars, it has traditionally been grown on pergolas and living trees rather than in conventional vineyards.

The grape is used primarily for the production of dry white wine and to a lesser extent, rakia and vinegar.

== History ==
Pulëz is considered to be one of Albania’s oldest cultivated grape varieties and is often referred to as the "grape of the centuries". Over generations it was selected and propagated by Albanian farmers, becoming closely associated with the traditional viticulture of the country’s south-central region.

Rather than being planted in rows, vines were historically trained over arbors or allowed to climb trees, especially oaks, creating extensive living canopies around rural homes and farmyards.

The grape has long played an important role in rural life. Harvest festivals and communal rakia-making celebrations traditionally marked the end of the growing season, particularly around Berat and Përmet. Pulëz rakia was commonly served at weddings and village festivities held in early autumn after distillation was complete.

== Distribution ==
As a native variety, Pulëz is cultivated primarily in the regions of Berat, Elbasan, Mallakastër, Përmet, Skrapar and Tepelenë. Smaller plantings also occur in Gjirokastër, Librazhd, Gramsh and Mat. The cultivar performs best in transitional Mediterranean climates with high temperature fluctuations and can be grown at elevations of up to 700 m (2,300 ft) above sea level.

The variety consistently yields abundant, high-quality grapes under a range of pruning systems and is considered less susceptible to powdery mildew when compared to other grape cultivars. Harvest generally takes place in early autumn, while vineyard operations such as weeding and harvesting are frequently carried out by hand.

== Ampelography ==
The grape is primarily vinified as a dry white wine with an alcohol content of approximately 12–14% and moderate acidity of around 5–6 g/L. The wines are typically medium- to full-bodied, with a pale golden to greenish-gold color and an aromatic profile marked by floral notes, ripe orchard fruit, herbs and a distinct mineral character. High-quality examples are capable of ageing successfully and are traditionally served at around 12 °C, pairing well with seafood, white meats and soft cheeses.

== Usage ==
Besides winemaking, Pulëz has traditionally been used for the production of rakia, known locally as "raki e lisit" (oak rakia), a type of brandy made from grapes harvested from vines trained on oak trees. The grape pomace is fermented for about 25 days before distillation. The variety is also used to produce vinegar and grape juice, while its juice has traditionally been used in rural households to color bread and prepare grape preserves served with bread and nuts.

== See also ==
- Albanian wine
