= Gramsh =

Gramsh may refer to several places in Albania:

- Gramsh District, a former district in Elbasan County
- Gramsh (municipality), a municipality
- Gramsh, Lezhë, a village in the municipality of Lezhë, Lezhë County

== See also ==
- KF Gramshi, a football club of Gramsh, Elbasan
- Grëmsh (dialectal rendering of Gramsh), a village in Berat County
