= Stambolleshë =

Albanian grape variety

- Grape (Vitis)
- Color of berry skin: Black
- Species: Vitis vinifera
- Origin: Albania
- Notable regions: Kolonjë
- Breeding institute: IKPFV
- Formation of seeds: Seeded

Stambolleshë (lit. 'Istanbulite') is a dark-skinned grape variety cultivated on a limited scale in the area surrounding Kolonjë, in southeastern Albania.

Historically grown as a table grape for fresh consumption, Stambolleshë was traditionally regarded as an introduced variety, with its name suggesting a foreign origin. The 1985 Albanian Encyclopedic Dictionary lists it alongside Sulltanina and Çaush among cultivars planted for this purpose during the Ottoman period.

However, a recent study conducted by the Department of Biotechnology at the Faculty of Natural Sciences in Tirana has classified Stambolleshë as an indigenous Albanian grape cultivar.

== Etymology ==
The name Stambolleshë derives from the Albanian word "Stamboll", meaning Istanbul and can literally be interpreted as "woman from Istanbul" or "Istanbulite".

The name reflects a common Albanian practice in which varieties of fruits and vegetables are named after the city of Istanbul, particularly when they are regarded as foreign or introduced.

Comparable names include "stamolli", used in the region of Përmet for varieties of quince and sweet cherry, "stambollesha" for a variety of plum and "speca stamollet" for a type of sweet pepper.

The name, as such, does not necessarily indicate that the grape was actually introduced from modern-day Turkey.

Stambolleshë may therefore be better understood as a type of grape traditionally distinguished from local Albanian cultivars by its name and presumed origin.

== See also ==
- Albanian wine
