= Debinë =

Albanian grape variety

- Grape (Vitis)
- Color of berry skin: Blanc, Noir
- Species: Vitis vinifera
- Origin: Albania
- Notable regions: Përmet, Këlcyrë, Leskovik, Devoll, Tepelenë
- Notable wines: Debinë e Bardhë, Debinë e Zezë
- Breeding institute: IKPFV
- Formation of seeds: Seeded
- Sex of flowers: Hermaphrodite
- VIVC number: 24569

Debinë is a collective name for two indigenous Albanian grape varieties, "Debinë e Bardhë" (White Debinë) and "Debinë e Zezë" (Black Debinë), cultivated primarily in southeastern Albania. Both varieties have declined in cultivation as vineyards across the country are increasingly adopting international grape alternatives.

== Ampelography ==
=== Debinë e Bardhë ===
Debinë e Bardhë is a white-skinned grape believed to have originated in the area around Përmet and Këlcyrë. Its cultivation is also documented in Leskovik, Devoll and Tepelenë.

The exact ampelographic identity and parentage of Debinë e Bardhë have not been conclusively established. DNA analysis of reference vines known as Debina Teki and Debina Kala, both sampled in Skrapar, showed that they are genetically distinct cultivars. Debina Teki was found to be closely related to the Greek variety Debina, whereas Debina Kala displayed genetic similarities to Bora, an Albanian grape variety that is no longer cultivated.

Debinë e Bardhë ripens during the second half of September. It forms compact clusters with an average weight of about 250 g, while the rounded berries typically weigh 2–3 g each. At maturity, the berries develop green to bronze-colored skins that contain 19.5–21.3% sugar and 6.7–7 g/L of tartaric acid. The grapes are relatively sensitive and poorly suited to delayed harvesting or transportation over long distances.

In winemaking, Debinë e Bardhë is capable of producing fresh, aromatic white wines, though their overall quality can vary considerably according to vinification practices.

Well-produced wines are clear and pale straw to light golden in color, often showing greenish highlights. Their aromatic character is primarily fruity and floral, with notes that may include apricot, peach, citrus, pineapple and green apple, occasionally complemented by hints of vanilla. On the palate, the wines are medium-bodied, with pronounced yet balanced acidity. They contain 11% alcohol by volume.

=== Debinë e Zezë ===
Debinë e Zezë is a dark-skinned grape cultivated mainly in southeastern Albania, with approximately 74% of its cultivated area located within the municipalities of Kolonjë and Përmet. The grape has also been vinified separately and evaluated as a varietal wine in the region of Berat.

Its clusters are elongated and conical, usually with one to three wings and have an average weight of about 200 g. The bunches are relatively loose and have a long peduncle measuring approximately 3–5 cm.

Ripening varies according to elevation. In the lower Përmet area, the grapes mature and are harvested by the end of August, while in Leskovik and Korçë the harvest generally occurs toward the end of September. At maturity, the grapes contain approximately 20–21% sugar and 5.7–6 g/L of tartaric acid.

Debina e Zezë is used in the production of rakia and red wine. It is also used to produce sweet fortified wines.

Wines are bright ruby red in color, with a fairly light appearance. They display a predominantly fruity aromatic profile, characterized by red and dark fruits such as cherry, blackberry and plum. On the palate, the wines are medium-bodied, with balanced acidity, supple tannins and a harmonious fruit character.

Debinë e Zezë is considered a promising native red wine cultivar, producing fresh, fruit-forward wines suitable for both early consumption and ageing.

== See also ==
- Albanian wine
