= Dhelpërak =

Albanian grape variety

- Grape (Vitis)
- Color of berry skin: Pink
- Species: Vitis vinifera
- Also called: Rrush dhelpre
- Origin: Albania
- Notable regions: Many regions
- Notable wines: Rosé wine
- Breeding institute: IKPFV
- Formation of seeds: Seeded
- VIVC number: 23799

Dhelpërak (lit. 'Fox grape'), also spelled Dhelparak, is an indigenous grape variety traditionally cultivated in both northern and southern Albania. The variety produces pink berries and is cultivated for fresh consumption as well as for the production of rosé wines and distilled beverages.

The grape is listed in the Albanian Genebank grapevine repository under accession code AGB3472.

== Ampelography ==
Dhelpërak is traditionally grown on pergolas and trellises. In southern Albania, it is found in Skrapar, Tepelenë, Gjirokastër and Përmet, while in the north it is cultivated in the lower highlands of Pukë and Mirditë.

The grapes ripen from late August to mid-September, with harvesting occurring between 25 August and 15 September. At maturity, the fruit contains approximately 19–20% sugar and 5–5.3 g/L of tartaric acid.

This variety produces small, round, light red berries measuring approximately 9 mm in diameter, arranged in compact clusters about 8 cm in length.

== Usage ==
Dhelpërak is a multipurpose grape. It is consumed fresh and traditionally used in the production of rakia, brandy and, to a lesser extent, rosé wine.

== See also ==
- Albanian wine
