= Ceruja =

Albanian grape variety

- Grape (Vitis)
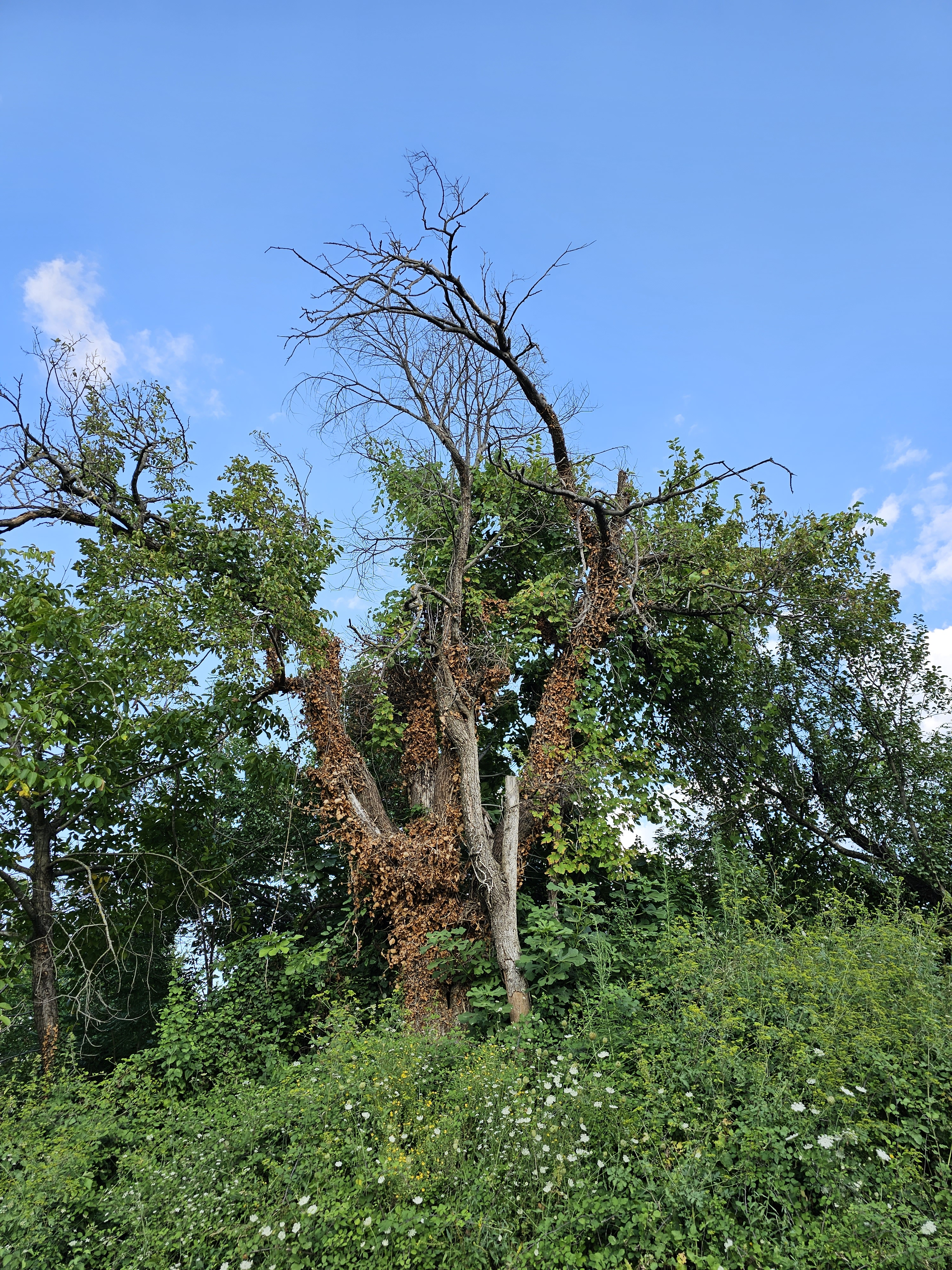
- Old vine of Ceruja grappling a mulberry tree
- Color of berry skin: Pale yellow
- Species: Vitis vinifera
- Also called: Grezda e Bardhë
- Origin: Albania
- Notable regions: Mat
- Notable wines: Ceruja wine
- Ideal soil: Limestone and mineral-rich soils
- Formation of seeds: Seeded

Ceruja (also spelled Cerruja or Cëruja) is a white grape variety indigenous to the Mat region of north-central Albania. One of the country’s rare cultivars, it takes its name from the village of Cerujë, near Klos, where it has been grown for centuries.

== Production ==
According to oral tradition, Ceruja derives its name from a local spring. The variety is cultivated on the lower slopes of Mount Balgjaj, where the vines are ungrafted since the region's soil has remained unaffected from phylloxera.

Ceruja has long been propagated by layering rather than grafting, allowing some vineyards to preserve exceptionally old vines, including specimens estimated to be more than 150 years old. The cultivar is highly productive, with a single vine capable of yielding up to 100 kg of grapes under favorable conditions.

== Ampelography ==
Ceruja wines are bright and clear, with a pale straw-yellow color accented by greenish and light golden hues. They exhibit a clean, moderately intense bouquet marked by aromas of citrus fruits, peach, pear, apple and fresh grapes, complemented by delicate floral notes of acacia and jasmine. Depending on the vinification method, subtle hints of yeast and buttery biscuits may also develop.

The berries are relatively small and capable of accumulating sugar levels of up to 25% while maintaining balanced natural acidity. These characteristics make the grape particularly suitable for the production of high-quality dry white wines.

On the palate, Ceruja is fresh, elegant and well balanced, combining moderate acidity with a smooth texture and harmonious structure. Its pronounced mineral character is attributed to the vine’s deep root system, which can extend between 6 and 15 meters into mineral-rich soils. The wine concludes with a long, persistent finish that enhances its complexity and distinguishes it from many other white wines.

Ceruja wines typically contain 12.5–13.5% alcohol, about 7.2 g/L total acidity (expressed tartaric acid), a pH of approximately 3.6 and around 28.9 g/L dry extract, values unusually high for a white wine and comparable to those of many red wines.

The grape is noted for its aging potential, with quality wines capable of maturing for up to ten years. During maturation, the wine gradually develops deeper golden and amber hues while gaining greater aromatic complexity and texture.

== Usage ==
Its naturally balanced sugar and acidity levels have made this grape variety suitable for the experimental production of sparkling wines.

The wine is best served chilled at around 8 °C and pairs particularly well with grilled fish, seafood, poultry, lamb and aged cheeses.

== See also ==
- Albanian wine
