= Kallmet (grape) =

Albanian grape variety

- Grape (Vitis)
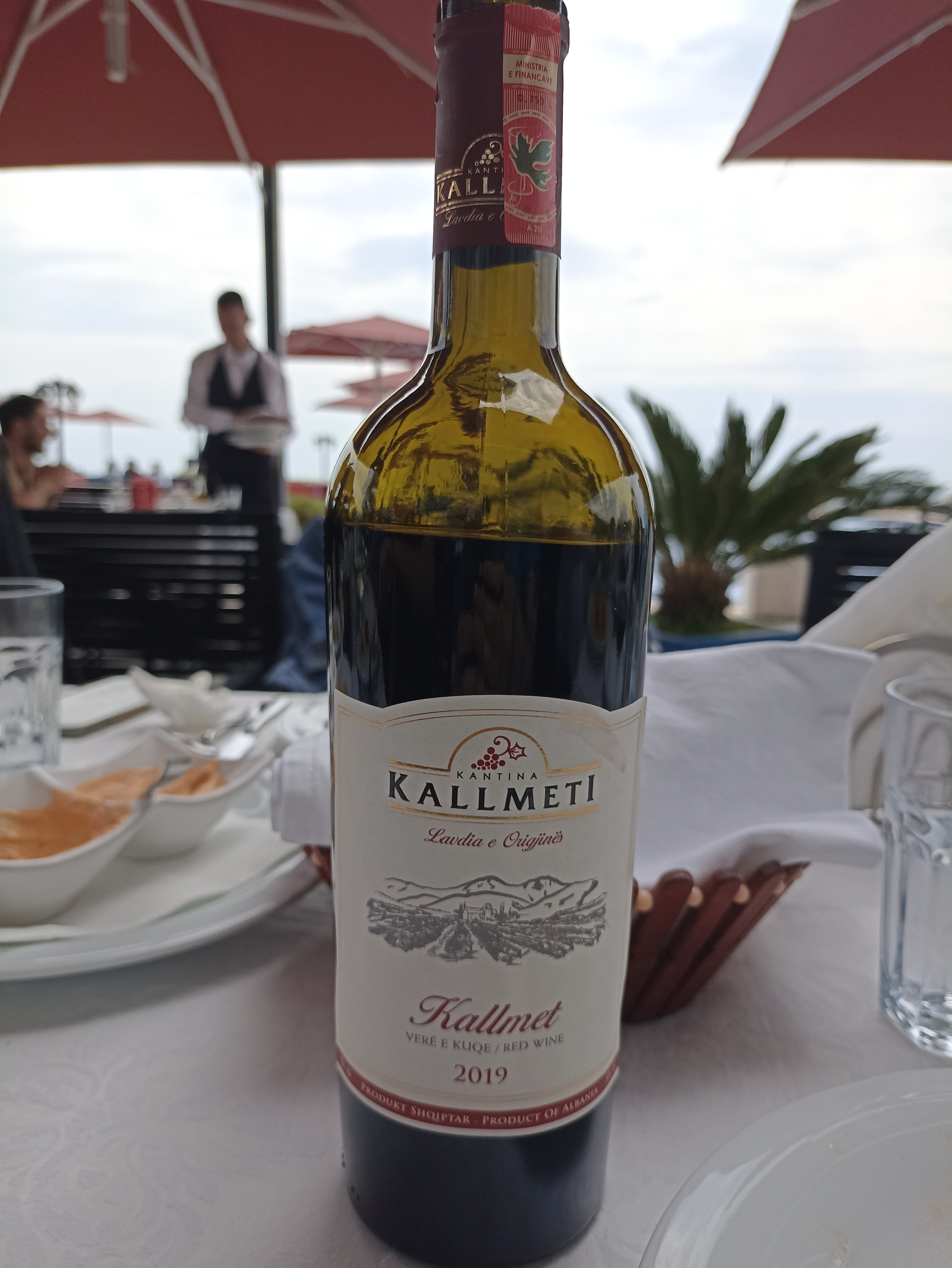
- A bottle of Black Kallmet
- Color of berry skin: Black
- Species: Vitis vinifera
- Also called: Gjashtore, Zadrimore
- Origin: Albania
- Notable regions: Mirditë, Lezhë, Shkodër, Malësi e Madhe
- Notable wines: Kallmet wine
- Formation of seeds: Seeded
- Sex of flowers: Hermaphrodite
- VIVC number: 24032

Kallmet (def. 'Kallmeti') is a red grape variety indigenous to the Zadrima region of northwestern Albania. It is regarded as one of the country’s most important wine grapes and has long been cultivated in the municipalities of Mirditë, Lezhë, Shkodër and Malësi e Madhe.

The variety is primarily used for the production of dry red wines, although it can also be utilized in the making of rakia, brandy and, to a lesser extent, as a table grape.

Kallmet is genetically similar to Hungary's Kadarka grape, likely derived from Skadar, the Slavic name for Shkodër.

== Ampelography ==
Kallmet, known locally as Gjashtore and Zadrimore, exists in two recognized phenotypic forms:

- Kallmet i Zi (Black Kallmet) is by far the most widespread form. It produces elongated grape clusters with dark brown to black berries and ripens between 10 and 20 September. It is the primary form used for red wine production and is also consumed fresh.
- Kallmet i Bardhë (White Kallmet) is considerably rarer. It ripens around the middle of September and is used for white wine production and fresh consumption.

When fully mature, the grapes typically contain 19–21% sugar, 4.8–5.0 g/L tartaric acid and have a pH of 3.4–3.6. Wines produced from the variety generally contain 11–13% alcohol by volume and 5.6–6.0 g/L total acidity.

== Winemaking ==
Kallmet is valued for producing deeply colored wines with moderate acidity, substantial tannin content and good ageing potential. Chemical analyses of commercial monovarietal Kallmet wines have shown that they contain high concentrations of condensed tannins (proanthocyanidins) and anthocyanins, compounds that contribute to color stability, structure and longevity. The wines also contain significant levels of stilbenes, particularly trans-piceid and trans-resveratrol, antioxidant compounds commonly found in Mediterranean red wines.

A study of sixteen commercial Kallmet wines found that their phenolic profile closely resembles that of other high-quality red wines produced in warm-climate viticultural regions.

== See also ==
- Albanian wine
