= Serinë =

Albanian grape variety

- Grape (Vitis)
- Color of berry skin: Blanc, Noir
- Species: Vitis vinifera
- Also called: Lavardar
- Origin: Albania
- Notable regions: Voskop, Polenë
- Notable wines: Serinë e Bardhë, Serinë e Zezë
- Breeding institute: IKPFV
- Formation of seeds: Seeded
- Sex of flowers: Hermaphrodite
- VIVC number: 17814

Serinë (def. 'Serina') is an indigenous grape variety cultivated in the southern and southeastern parts of Albania. It occurs in two phenotypic forms: "Serinë e Bardhë" (White Serinë) and "Serinë e Zezë" (Black Serinë). Both are used in winemaking, distillation and as table grapes.

== Ampelography ==
DNA analysis of sixteen Serinë grapevine samples from Voskop and Polenë found that the Albanian variety showed partial similarity with the French Syrah but no full genetic correspondence was observed.

=== Serinë e Bardhë ===
Serinë e Bardhë is cultivated in vineyards and household vine arbors across Korçë, Pogradec, Leskovik, Devoll, Përmet, Gjirokastër and Tepelenë. Its grapes reach maturity from late August to mid-September. At harvest, the must contains about 19–20% sugar and 6.2–6.4 g/L of tartaric acid, with a pH ranging from 3.5 to 3.8.

The variety is used mainly for the production of dry white wines which are clear and pale golden in color, with straw-colored hues. They have a distinct aromatic profile dominated by peach, green apple, pear and lemon. On the palate, the wines are fresh and medium-bodied, combining noticeable acidity with a balanced, fruit-forward character.

Serinë e Bardhë has good ageing potential and has been used in the production of rakia or consumed fresh as a table grape.

=== Serinë e Zezë ===
Serinë e Zezë is cultivated mainly around Korçë, Pogradec, Leskovik and Ersekë. It ripens later than its white counterpart, with harvesting taking place from early to late September. At maturity, the grapes contain approximately 20–21% sugar and 5.8–6.2 g/L of tartaric acid. The clusters are medium-sized and moderately compact.

The wines have a deep ruby-red color with violet hues and a concentrated aromatic profile dominated by red and dark fruits. Cherry, sour cherry, blueberry and pomegranate are among the most pronounced aromas, while some wines also develop vanilla and mineral notes.

On the palate, the wines are medium- to full-bodied, with balanced acidity and soft tannins and may develop greater complexity with ageing.

In addition to red wine, Serinë e Zezë is used for the production of rakia and other grape distillates.

== See also ==
- Albanian wine
