= Debina (grape) =

Variety of grape

- Grape (Vitis)
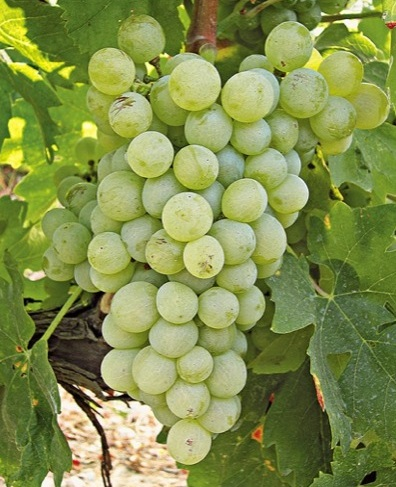
- Color of berry skin: Blanc
- Species: Vitis vinifera
- Also called: See list of synonyms
- Origin: Albania
- Notable regions: Zitsa
- VIVC number: 3481

Debina is a white Albanian & Greek wine grape primarily in the Përmet region in Albania and Zitsa region of Epirus. The grape's high acidity lends itself to sparkling wine production.

== Synonyms ==
Debina is also known under the synonyms Dempina, Ntempina, and Zitsa.
