= Kryqëz =

Albanian grape variety

- Grape (Vitis)
- Color of berry skin: Green
- Species: Vitis vinifera
- Origin: Albania
- Notable regions: Përmet, Korçë, Leskovik, Gjirokastër
- Notable wines: Kyqëz wine
- Formation of seeds: Seeded
- VIVC number: 26424

Kryqëz (lit. 'Small cross'), also spelled as Kryqës, is an indigenous white grape variety traditionally cultivated in southeastern Albania, particularly around Përmet, Korçë, Leskovik and Gjirokastër. Primarily used for white wine production, the variety is noted for its relatively high sugar content, moderate acidity and good yield potential.

== Etymology ==
The name "Kryqëz" has been associated with the uneven development of berries within its clusters, in which larger, fully developed grapes occur alongside smaller berries. This contrast in berry size has been interpreted as a form of "crossing" and linked to the Albanian word kryq (cross), ultimately derived from Latin crux, through its accusative form crucem.

The name has also been compared with Krstač, an old white grape variety traditionally grown in Montenegro, around the vicinity of Podgorica. The name Krstač refers to the cross-like form of its cylindrical-conical bunches, which have prominent lateral lobes or "shoulders". The similarity between the two names may reflect comparable naming traditions, although no genetic relationship between Kryqëz and Krstač has been established.

== Ampelography ==
Kryqëz features medium-sized, pentagonal leaves with five lobes. Anthocyanin pigmentation along the main veins of the upper surface is very weak. The leaf teeth are moderately long and convex, the petiole sinus is open and the underside of the blade has a moderate covering of erect hairs between the veins.

The variety forms medium to large clusters borne on long peduncles. The berries are medium-sized, round and green, containing one or two medium-sized seeds. Measurements taken between 2015 and 2019 found a typical cluster weight of 331.2 g, with an average length of 17.3 cm and width of 14.2 cm. Each cluster contained about 202 berries.

== Winemaking ==
Kryqëz is considered a productive variety with a favorable balance of sugars and acidity for white wine production. Its sugar content ranges from 22.8% to 23.8% with a total acidity of 3.8 to 4.5 g/L. These characteristics are considered suitable for producing good-quality white wines.

The variety has moderate resistance to two important fungal diseases of grapevines, powdery mildew (Uncinula necator) and downy mildew (Plasmopara viticola). Pre-harvest observations found disease symptoms affecting approximately 20–30% of the clusters under the conditions of the experimental collection.

== See also ==
- Albanian wine
