= Vlosh =

Albanian grape variety

- Grape (Vitis)
- Color of berry skin: Red
- Species: Vitis vinifera
- Origin: Albania
- Notable regions: Vlorë
- Notable wines: Vlosh wine
- Breeding institute: IKPFV
- Formation of seeds: Seeded
- VIVC number: 13145

Vlosh is a red grape variety indigenous to southwestern Albania. It is among the country’s oldest grape varieties and has traditionally been grown in the vineyards surrounding Narta Lagoon.

During the Middle Ages, Vlosh was regarded as a premium cultivar, grown extensively on the estates of several leading Albanian noble families, including the Muzaka, Spata and Thopia dynasties.

== Distribution ==
Vlosh is cultivated across much of southern Albania, although its main area of cultivation is concentrated in the coastal hills surrounding the Narta Lagoon, particularly near Kaninë, Trevëllazër and Zvërnec. Smaller vineyards are also found in the regions of Berat and Fier. The variety likely takes its name from the village of Vlosh, in the municipality of Roskovec, where it has also been traditionally cultivated.

In the vineyards of Panajë and the Vlorë coastal plain, Vlosh grapes generally ripen between late August and early September. Harvesting usually begins in the second half of September, with the fruit picked entirely by hand to ensure optimal quality.

== Ampelography ==
Vlosh bears medium-sized, moderately compact clusters. Its leaves are nearly circular and deeply divided into five lobes, while the berries are round to slightly oval, with skins ranging from pinkish-red to reddish-purple. When fully ripe, the grapes contain 21–22% sugar and 5.8–6.2 g/L titratable acidity, making it well suited for red wine production. In traditional winemaking, the grapes are commonly fermented with native yeasts through spontaneous fermentation, which lasts between five to seven days.

== Winemaking ==
Although Vlosh is classified as a red grape variety, its relatively thin skins produce wines that are lighter in color than those of many other red cultivars, displaying pale ruby tones that gradually develop amber or onion-skin hues with age. The wines are full-bodied, firmly structured and rich in tannins, with pronounced aromas of ripe red fruit. They usually contain between 12% and 14% alcohol and are distinguished by balanced acidity and a pleasantly bitter, slightly astringent finish.

In addition to dry red wines, Vlosh is also used to produce sweet wines, while its grape must serves as a base for dessert wines and liqueurs. The variety is frequently blended with international cultivars such as Cabernet Sauvignon, to enhance color intensity, body and aromatic complexity.

Traditionally, Vlosh wine is intended for early consumption rather than prolonged cellaring. It has long formed part of the culinary traditions of the Narta Lagoon, where it is commonly paired with regional seafood dishes, especially baked eel, mullet and other locally caught fish.

Beginning in the 1970s, large vineyard areas around Vlorë, including Babicë, Akërni, Trevëllazër and Çekodhimë, were converted to olive groves as olive production became increasingly important. This shift resulted in a sharp decline in the acreage devoted to Vlosh and the production of its traditional wines.

Today, Vlosh is cultivated on a relatively limited scale and only a small number of Albanian wineries continue to produce varietal wines from the grape.

== See also ==
- Albanian wine
