= Manakuq =

Albanian grape variety

- Grape (Vitis)
- Color of berry skin: Pink
- Species: Vitis vinifera
- Also called: Ferracaku, Keci, Pllovdina
- Origin: Albania
- Notable regions: Shkodër, Mirditë, Tropojë
- Notable wines: Rosé wine
- Formation of seeds: Seeded
- VIVC number: 23806

Manakuq (lit. 'Red mulberry') is a pink grape variety traditionally cultivated in the mountainous regions of northern Albania. The cultivar has been maintained through local selection for generations and is grown primarily for the production of light, aromatic red-rosé wines.

== Distribution ==
The grape variety is most widely cultivated within the mountainous region extending across northern Albania, parts of Kosovo and southeastern Montenegro. Its main growing areas include the former districts of Shkodër, Mirditë and Tropojë. The variety is known locally as Ferracaku, while in Kosovo as Keci and in Montenegro it is referred to as Pllovdina.

== Ampelography ==
Manakuq produces medium-sized clusters of pink grapes whose berries develop a reddish-brown skin coated with a dense natural waxy bloom at full ripeness.

The grapes typically reach a sugar content of 21–22% at harvest, with 5.2–5.6 g/L titratable acidity, providing a suitable balance for red-rosé wine production.

The wines are pale pink to rose-red in color, with subtle floral aromas and a fresh, delicate profile, attaining an alcohol content of 8–9% by volume.

== See also ==
- Albanian wine
