= Mjaltëz =

Albanian grape variety

- Grape (Vitis)
- Color of berry skin: Red
- Species: Vitis vinifera
- Origin: Albania
- Notable regions: Kolonjë
- Formation of seeds: Seeded
- VIVC number: 26427

Mjaltëz (lit. 'Honeyed'), also spelled Mjaltës, is an indigenous grape variety traditionally cultivated in the Kolonjë region of southeastern Albania.

The variety is considered extremely rare, with one ampelographic account reporting the survival of only a single vine in the village of Kçirë.

== Etymology ==
Mjaltëz takes its name from the native Albanian word mjaltë (honey) with the suffix -ëz, conveying the meaning "honey-like" or "honeyed", in reference to the sweetness of the grape.

== Ampelography ==
Mjaltëz produces loose, cylindrical to pyramidal clusters with small lateral wings. The clusters typically measure 17–18 cm long and 7–8 cm wide, with a weight ranging from 150 to 180 g.

The berries are medium-sized and round, with thin, reddish skins and sweet, juicy pulp. They have a high sugar content and generally contain one or two seeds.

The grape ripens early, showing strong resistance to several common grapevine diseases.

== See also ==
- Albanian wine
