= Mereshnik =

Albanian grape variety

- Grape (Vitis)
- Color of berry skin: Green
- Species: Vitis vinifera
- Also called: Meresnik
- Origin: Albania
- Notable wines: Mereshnik wine
- Breeding institute: IKPFV
- Formation of seeds: Seeded
- VIVC number: 26426

Mereshnik (also spelled Meresnik) is a rare white grape cultivar traditionally grown in Albania. It is primarily used as a table grape and belongs to the group of aromatic, Muscat-type varieties. The grape is distinguished by its pronounced fragrance, often described as musky or perfumed.

== Etymology ==
The grape's name is associated with the obsolete Albanian word mereshnik, meaning “aroma” or “fragrance”, which derives from meresh, a term referring to scent or smell.

Meresh has also been linked to South Slavic languages, including Bulgarian miriz and miris ("smell, scent") and Croatian miris ("fragrance, scent; perfume"). These words have further been traced to the Greek μύρισα (mýrisa), the aorist of μυρίζω (myrízo), "to smell".

Seemingly, the name may have originated as a descriptive reference to the cultivar's strongly aromatic, Muscat-like character.

== Ampelography ==
Mereshnik is a white-berried cultivar classified as a table grape and forms part of the grapevine collection preserved at the Albanian Fruit Science Institute (IKPFV) in Vlorë.

== See also ==
- Albanian wine
