= Kosinjot =

Albanian grape variety

- Grape (Vitis)
- Color of berry skin: Black
- Species: Vitis vinifera
- Origin: Albania
- Notable regions: Përmet
- Notable wines: Kosinjot wine
- Breeding institute: IKPFV
- Formation of seeds: Seeded
- VIVC number: 23803

Kosinjot (also spelled Kosinjat), is a black-berried grape variety indigenous to Albania. It is an extremely rare cultivar included in the Albanian Genebank catalog and in several European germplasm collections, under different synonyms.

== Parentage ==
Kosinjot is believed to have taken its name from the village of Kosinë, in southern Albania, where it has been cultivated for generations.

DNA profiling has shown that the grape variety is genetically similar to several grapevine accessions preserved under different names in European germplasm collections. These include "Servin Chernyi" in Germany and Slovakia, "Rosso di Lecce" in Italy and an accession labelled Vitis sylvestris "Pioppeto" at the Istituto Agrario di San Michele all’Adige, indicating that they are the same cultivar.

Subsequent genetic analyses have identified the Apulian variety "Zagarese Nero" as a direct offspring of Kosinjot. Further genetic studies have also revealed a first-degree relationship between Kosinjot and the historic white grape "Weißer Heunisch" (Gouais blanc), one of the most important ancestral varieties in European viticulture.

== See also ==
- Albanian wine
