= Kosinë =

- Village
- Location within Albania
- Coordinates: 40°16′20″N 20°18′10″E
- Country: Albania
- County: Gjirokastër
- Municipality: Përmet
- Administrative unit: Qendër Piskovë
- Time zone: UTC+1 (CET)
  - Summer (DST): UTC+2 (CEST)

Kosinë is a village in Gjirokastër County, southern Albania. At the 2015 local government reform it became part of the municipality Përmet.

== History ==
In the early 19th century Pouqueville – a French doctor who was on a diplomatic mission to the court of Ali Pasha of Ioannina between 1806 and 1815 – wrote that in Kosinë there were approximately 20 families of shepherds, probably Aromanians. By 1920 a school was founded.

The current population of the village is 956.

== Culture ==
The dominant religious is Orthodoxy but a Muslim Bektashi minority are also hosted in the village. The villagers show a strong connection with the Byzantine Church of the Virgin Mary, but it is not known if there was already a village in the 12th century AD when the church was built.

The Feast of the Dormition of Mary is celebrated Kosinë as throughout all of Southern Albania with the gathering of people around the church on the night of August 14 and concludes with a mass in honour of the Virgin Mary on the following morning. Many migrants who return to their places of origin for the summer holiday also participate in the feast.

Kosinë is one of the largest villages in the Municipality of Përmet, which is 7 km away. It is located along the slopes of Mount Kosinë and the Vjosa Valley.

== Settlements ==
The settlement is divided into four different quarters, one of which is known as "quarter of the Vlachs", Vlach being another name for Aromanian. The oldest quarter is located on the ridge and near the church, with which it occupies the upper part of the village.

== Economy ==
Agricultural activities are mostly concentrated in the area Kosinë, which possess a rich hydrographic network and geo-pedological conditions that have contributed to the development of a thriving agriculture. Kosinë is in close relationship to the Vjosa and to the tributaries of the Lemnica, which have favoured a greater agricultural productivity.
