= Albanian wine =

Wine making in Albania

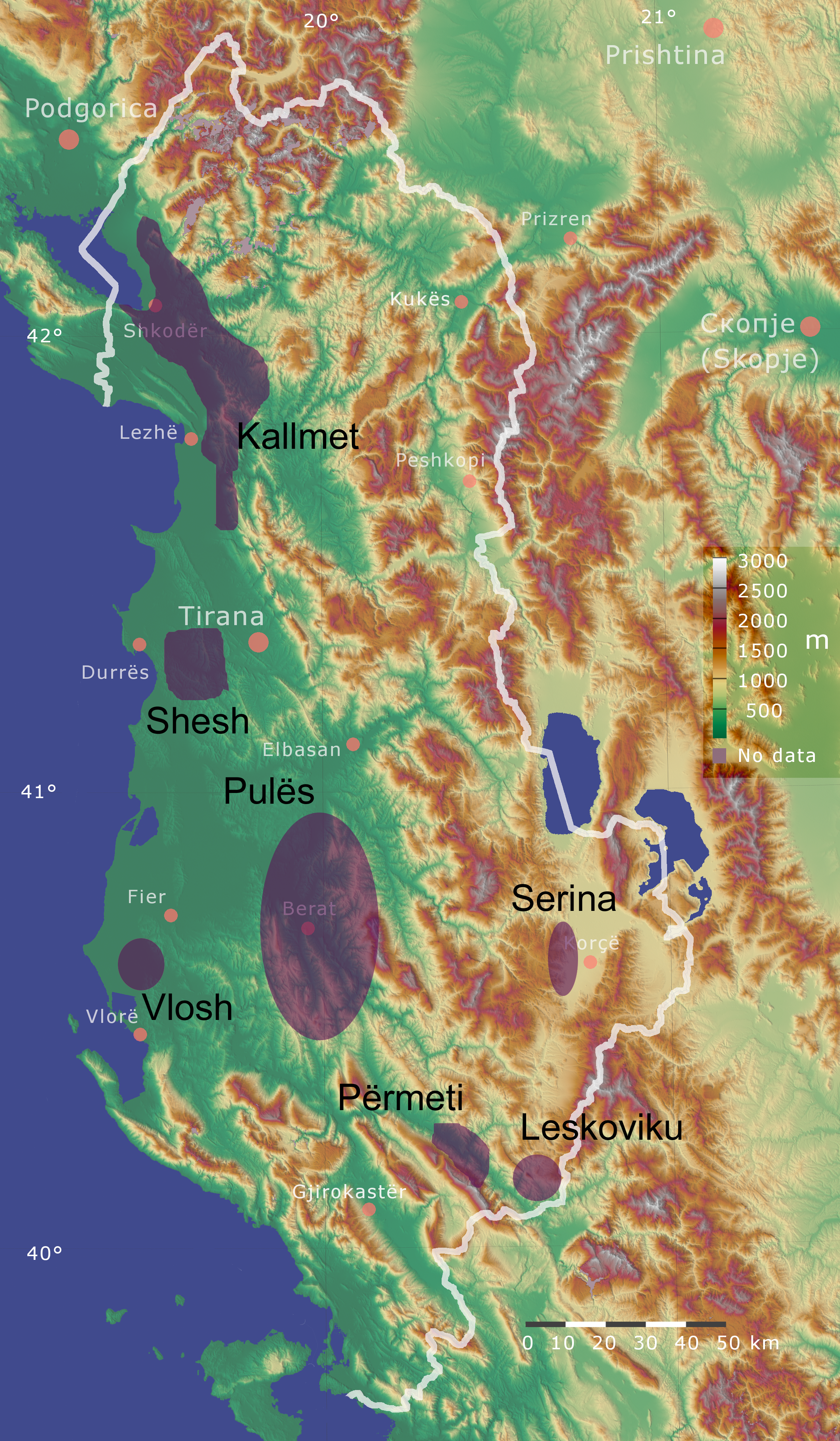
Albanian wine varieties in Albania

Albanian wine (Albanian: Vera Shqiptare) is produced in several regions throughout Albania within the Mediterranean Basin. The country has one of the oldest wine making traditions, dating back at least 3000 years ago to the Bronze Age Illyrians, with wine/grapes tradition in the Albanian language preserved since the earliest Proto-Indo-European period (Proto-Indo-Anatolian). The Albanian wine belongs chronologically to the old world of wine producing countries.

Albania is a mountainous Mediterranean country with the Mediterranean Sea to the west. The country experiences a distinctly Mediterranean climate, which means that the winters are mild and summers usually hot and dry. The favourable climate and fertile soil of the mountainous areas of the country are well suited to viticulture.

Albania produced an estimated 17,500 tonnes of wine in 2009. In the last decade, production of wine grew exponentially, reaching in 2019 23,470 tons.

== History ==
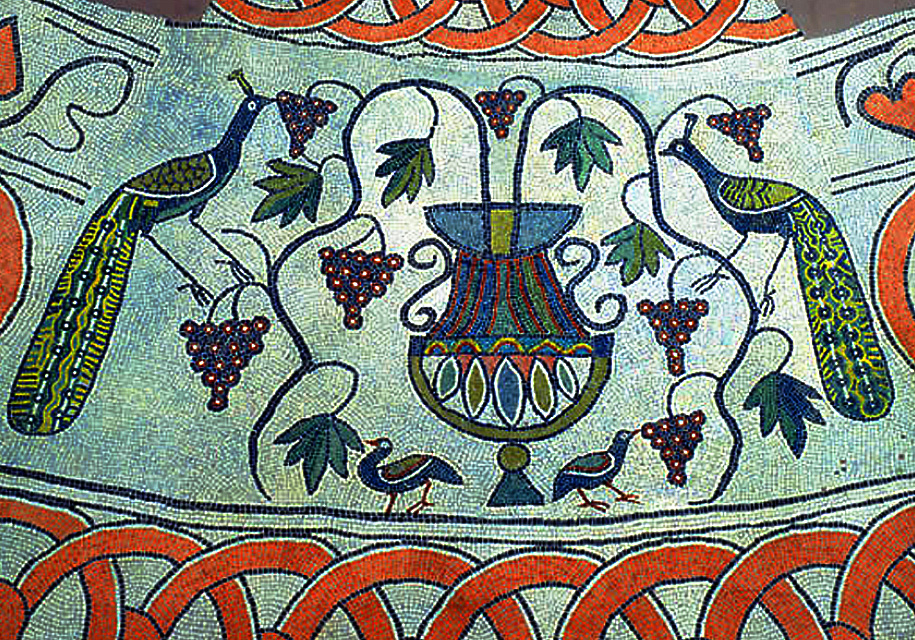
A mosaic within the baptistery of Butrint from the 6th century

The territory that is now Albania was one of few places where grapes were extant during the Ice Age. The oldest seeds discovered in the region are between 4,000 and 6,000 years old. The word for 'wine' (Gheg Albanian: venë; Tosk Albanian: verë) is among the oldest ones in Albanian, tracing back to the earliest Proto-Indo-European (Proto-Indo-Anatolian) exploitation of grapes, with ascertained cognates for 'wine' also found in Hittite, Luwian, Greek and Latin.

Along with neighbouring Greece, Albania has the longest continuous history of viticulture in Europe. Within Illyria it existed hundreds of years before the expansion of the Roman Empire in the Balkan Peninsula.

During the Roman period, wine production increased and became more organised. Decorations on numerous religious and household items bear witness to the wine-making culture such as in Butrint. Although later in the 15th century, the Ottoman Turks arrived in Southeastern Europe. During that period the vineyards experienced a decline and were mostly found in Christian-majority regions.

After the Albanian Declaration of Independence, viticulture gained widespread popularity but was almost destroyed in 1933 by phylloxera. A significant upturn began only after the Second World War, at the end of which wine was still cultivated on only 2,737 hectares. The most important producing region was around Durrës, where grapes were grown by communist state enterprises. In that time the nationwide acreage corresponded approximately to that of tobacco, but was significantly lower than that of olive and fruit trees. The exported wine was consumed primarily in Germany. The export decreased continuously from 61,000 hectolitres in 1971 to 22,000 hectolitres in 1985. The reasons are to be found mainly in outdated production conditions and insufficient technical material that made it difficult to transport and lowered the quality. On the other hand, the export of easily transportable raisins was continuously in increase (up to 3500 tons per year), while the export of fresh grapes was marginal. The most common varieties were Merlot, Cabernet Sauvignon, Pinot Noir, Sangiovese and Riesling.

Vineyards and wine production has been steadily increasing in recent years following the institution of democracy and capitalism.

== Production ==
Production figures
	1950	1960	1970	1980	1990	2007	2009	2015
Vineyard area (ha)	2,430	8,545	11,020	16,719	17,621	9,103	9,806	10,178
Production (tonnes)	21,400	22,300	64,500	66,200	91,000	146,500 (Note: Other sources put the figure at 105,000 tonnes (FAO: Agribusiness Handbook Grapes, Wine))	162,800	204,000

== Wine regions ==
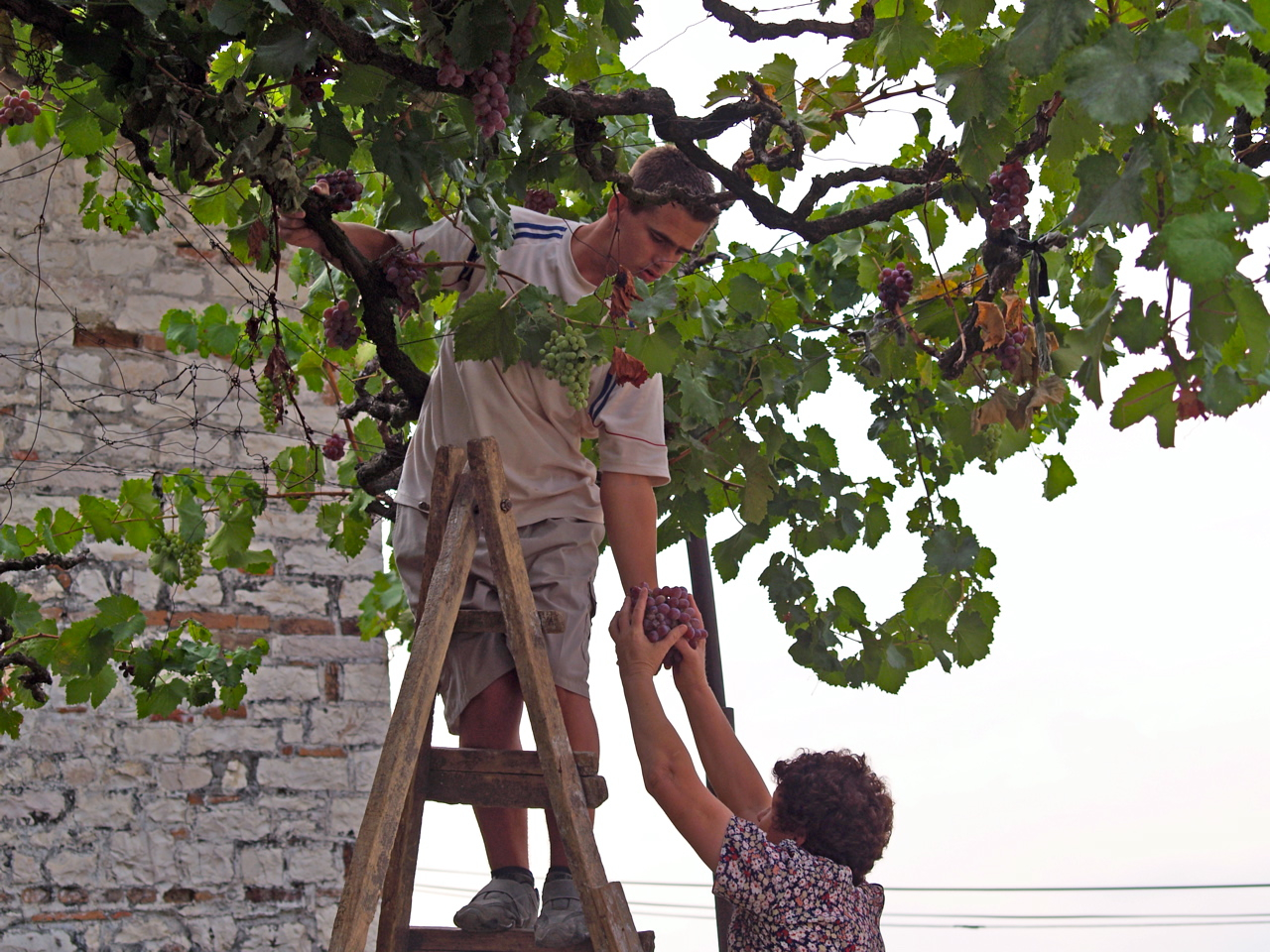
Picking grapes in Berat

Albania can be separated into four wine regions, which are mainly defined by their altitude. The regions includes the Coastal plains, Central hilly region, Eastern mountainous region and Mountain region. The highest vineyards sit at altitudes of approximately 1,000–1,300 metres (3,300–4,300 ft) in the slopes of the Albanian Alps in the north and Pindus Mountains in the southeast.

- The coastal plains (Western lowlands) rise to 300 m/990 ft and encompass the towns of Tirana, Kavajë, Durrës, Shkodër, Lezhë, Lushnje, Fier, Vlorë, Pukë and Delvinë.
- The central hilly region varies between 300 and 600 m/1,980 ft altitude and includes Elbasan, Krujë, Gramsh, Berat, Përmet, Librazhd and Mirditë.
- The Eastern sub-mountainous region lies between 600 and 800 m and surrounds the towns of Pogradec, Korçë, Leskovik and Peshkopi.
- Mountains (Highlands) vines are also grown as high as 1,000 m/3,300 ft. Soils are generally clay silica of varied depths and exposures.

== Indigenous grape varieties ==
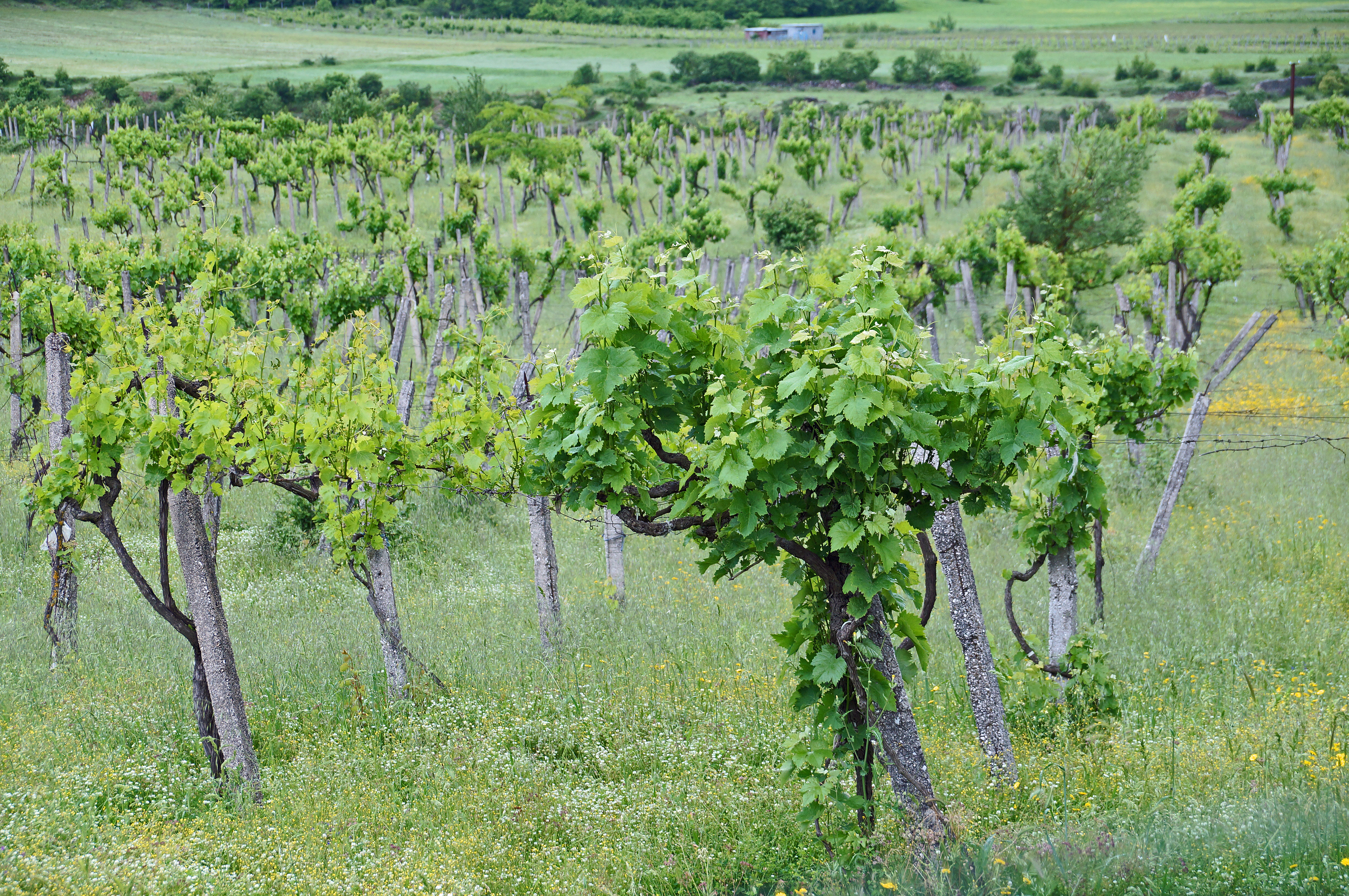
Albanian wine harvesting

The main indigenous grape varieties found in Albania are: Shesh, Kallmet, Vlosh, Serinë, Pulëz, Ceruja, Mereshnik, Debinë, Kryqëz, Kosinjot, Mjaltëz, Manakuq, Kotekë, Stambolleshë, Tajka, Birvol, Sinanbel, Dhelpërak, etc.

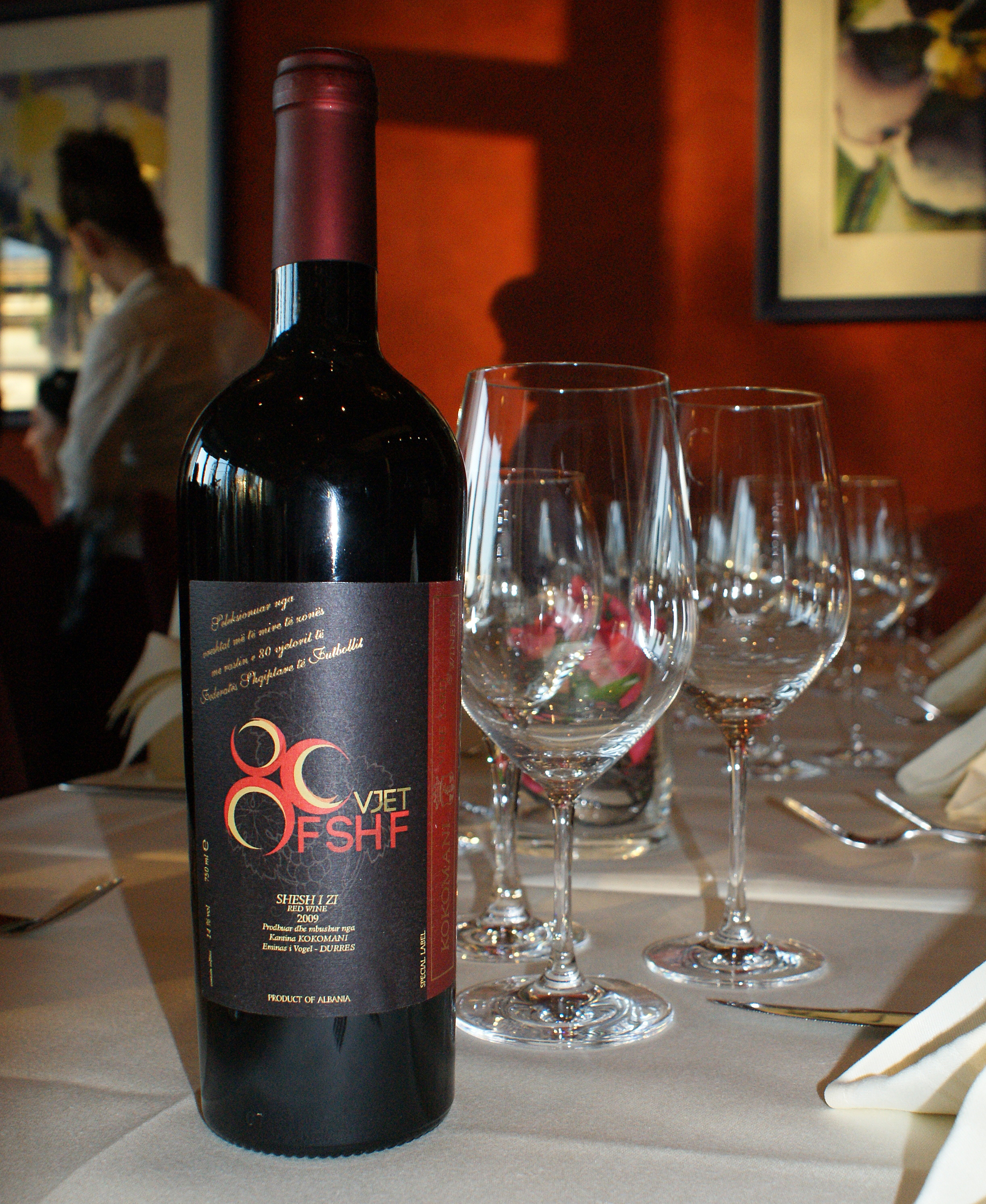
Bottle of Shesh i Zi

== List of wineries ==
Wineries (kantina in Albanian) in Albania include: Medaur, Kallmeti, Rilindja, Skënderbeu, Çobo, Luani, Bardha, Arbëri, Sara, Alimani, Uka, Lundra, Faba, Vintage, Mani, Sallaku, Constantino Spanchis, Kardinal, Zika, Belba, Nurellari, Balaj, Koto, Vila Duka (great for shared dining), Vila Shehi, Vila Hadaj, Belba, Enol, Korca 2000, and Kokomani.

== Preferences ==
According to Nasse and Zigori (1968) the best native Albanian wine varieties are Debinë (noir and blanc), Kallmet, Mereshnik, Mjaltëz, Serinë (rouge and blanc), Shesh i Bardhë, and Vlosh. The best wine-producing regions are Berat, Korçë, Tirana, Durrës and the region between Lezhë and Shkodër.

== See also ==
- Cuisine of Albania
- Agriculture in Albania
- Old World wine
- Andrea Shundi
- Winemaking
